= Lakkomata =

Community in Erymanthos, Achaea, Greece

Λακκώματα Lakkomata
- Community
- Location within Greece
- Coordinates: 38°1′51″N 21°51′55″E
- Country: Greece
- Geographic region: Peloponnese
- Administrative region: Western Greece
- Regional unit: Achaea
- Municipality: Erymanthos
- Municipal unit: Farres

Area
  - Community: 20.8 km^{2} (8.0 sq mi)
- Elevation: 610 m (2,000 ft)

Population (2021)
  - Community: 61
  - Density: 2.9/km^{2} (7.6/sq mi)
- Time zone: UTC+2 (EET)
  - Summer (DST): UTC+3 (EEST)
- Postal code: 250 08
- Area code: 26940
- Vehicle registration: AX, AZ

Lakkomata (Greek: Λακκώματα) is a mountain village and community in the municipality of Erymanthos in Achaea, Greece. According to the 2021 census, it had 61 inhabitants. In 2011 the village had 113 inhabitants and the community, which also includes the settlement Tsapournia, 133 inhabitants.

== Geography ==
Lakkomata is located in the upper valley of the river Peiros, at the northeast foot of the mountain Erymanthos, at an elevation of 610 m above sea level. It is 11 km southeast of Chalandritsa, 25 km southeast of Patras and 21 km west of Kalavryta.

== History ==
The village was mentioned in a 1700 Venetian text by Grimani under the name "Licomati di Nexero" (Λυκομάτι Νεζερού) and had 129 inhabitants. After the Greek War of Independence, it became part of the municipality of Nezera in 1835. That municipality was dissolved in 1841 and Lakkomata became part of the municipality of Fares. It became an independent community in 1912. In 1997 under the Kapodistrias reform, it became part of the municipality of Farres, which became part of the municipality of Erymanthos in 2011.

=== Historical population ===
Census	Population
1835	372
1851	379
1861	405
1879	470
1889	341
1896	395
1907	411
1920	389
1928	278
1940	259
1951	258
1961	286
1971	255
1981	178
1991	147
2001	117
2011	133
2021	61
