= Katarki =

Katarki, Kataraki, Katharki or Katharaki may refer to:

== Places ==
- Kataraki, Bagalkot, a village in Bilagi Taluka, Bagalkot District, Karnataka, India
- Katharaki, Bagalkot, a village in Badami Taluka, Bagalkot District, Karnataka, India
- Katarki, Raichur, a village in Manvi Taluka, Raichur District, Karnataka, India
- Katarki-Gudlanur, a village in Koppal Taluka, Koppal District, Karnataka, India

== People ==
- B. H. Katarki, an Indian agricultural scientist

== See also ==
- Katak, the eighth month of the Nanakshahi calendar
- Kataki, a wedding sari
- Katarraktis, a mountain village in Achaea, Greece
