= Farres =

Municipal unit in Achaea, Greece

Farres Φαρρές
- Municipal unit
- Location within the regional unit

- Location within Greece
- Coordinates: 38°6′N 21°47′E
- Country: Greece
- Administrative region: West Greece
- Regional unit: Achaea
- Municipality: Erymanthos

Area
  - Municipal unit: 241.85 km^{2} (93.38 sq mi)
- Elevation: 341 m (1,119 ft)

Population (2021)
  - Municipal unit: 4,402
  - Municipal unit density: 18.20/km^{2} (47.14/sq mi)
- Time zone: UTC+2 (EET)
  - Summer (DST): UTC+3 (EEST)
- Postal code: 250 08
- Area code: 26940
- Vehicle registration: ΑΧ
- Website: www.farron.gov.gr

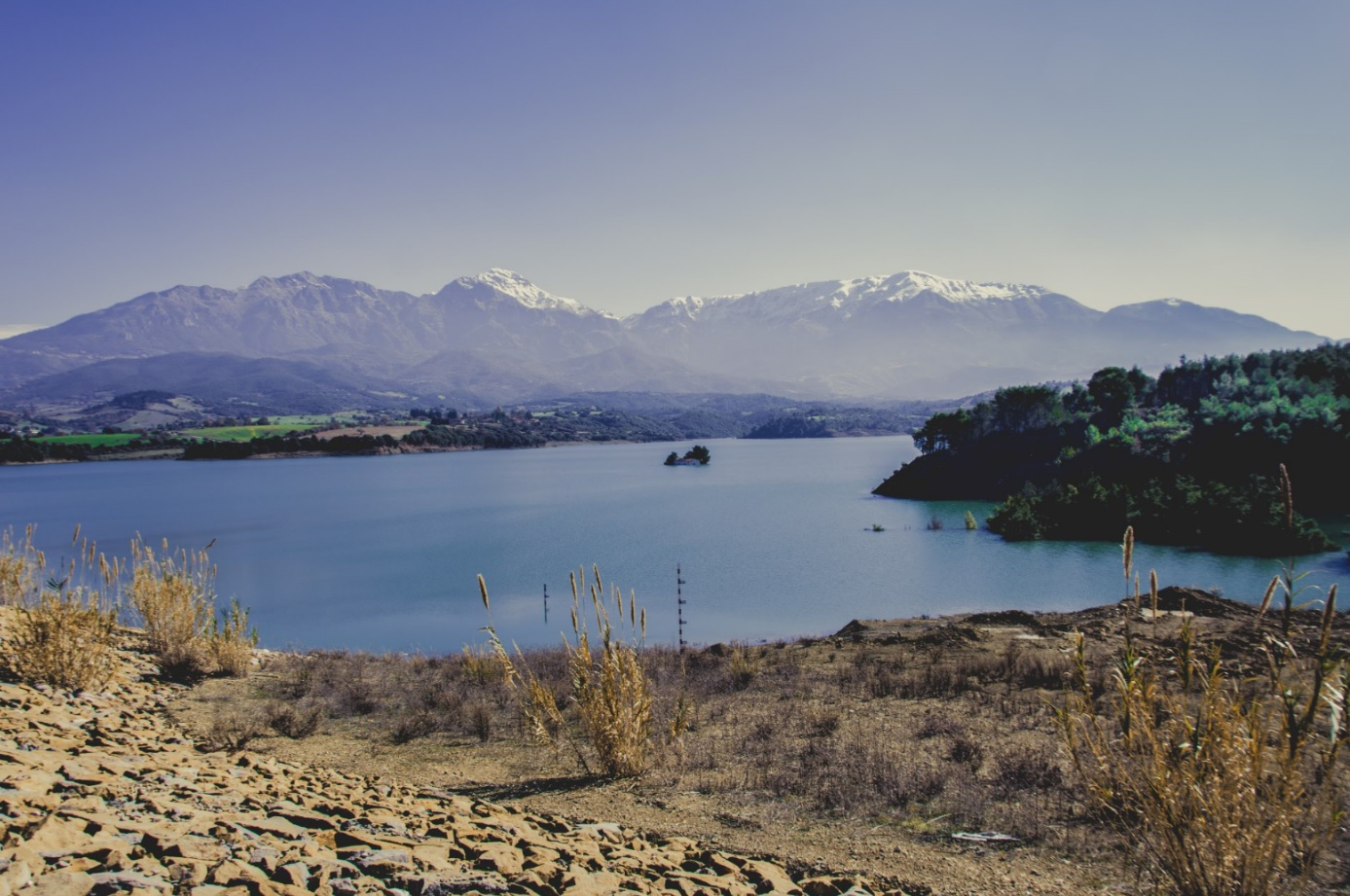
Asteri Dam or Parapiros Dam in Farres and Olenia boundary region. View of the dam lake. The temporary islet with Saint Theodores' chapel of Mitopolis village sinking. Mt. Erymanthos in the background.

Farres (Greek: Φαρρές) is a former municipality in Achaea, West Greece, Greece. Since the 2011 local government reform, it is part of the municipality Erymanthos, of which it is a municipal unit. The municipal unit has an area of 241.848 km^{2}. The municipality of Farres existed between 1835 and 1912, and again between 1998 and 2011. Its seat of administration was in the town Chalandritsa. Farres is situated in the centre of Achaea, on the upper courses of the rivers Peiros and Parapeiros. Towards the southeast (Mount Erymanthos) and northeast (Panachaiko) the terrain is increasingly mountainous. It is located about 15 km south of Patras and 30 km west of Kalavryta. The Patras–Tripoli national road (EO33) runs through the western part of the municipal unit.

== Subdivisions ==
The municipal unit Farres is subdivided into the following communities (constituent villages in brackets):

- Chalandritsa (Chalandritsa, Kydonies, Mastoraiika-Stamaiika)
- Chrysopigi (Chrysopigi, Ano Chrysopigi)
- Elliniko (Elliniko, Agia Eleousa, Koumani, Neochori, Chrysavgi)
- Fares (Fares, Prevedos)
- Isoma
- Kalanistra (Kalanistra, Rodia)
- Kalanos
- Kalousi
- Katarraktis
- Kritharakia (Kritharakia, Asteri, Toskes)
- Lakkomata (Lakkomata, Tsapournia)
- Mirali
- Neo Kompigadi (Neo Kompigadi, Micha, Platanos)
- Platanovrysi (Platanovrysi, Agia Paraskevi, Kato Platanovrysi, Koimisis)
- Starochori (Ano Starochori, Dafnoula, Kato Starochori, Trousas)
- Vasiliko (Vasiliko, Agrilia, Kydonies, Sterna, Stefani)

== Historical population ==
| Year | Population |
|---|---|
| 1991 | 6,483 |
| 2001 | 6,262 |
| 2011 | 5,076 |
| 2021 | 4,402 |

== History ==
Near Chalandritsa, a Mycenaean settlement was excavated in 1985. Pharae was one of the cities of the Achaean League. After the Roman conquest, it belonged to Patras. During the Frankish rule (13th-14th century) the Barony of Chalandritsa was established. The barony was ruled by the French Dramelay (or Trémolay) family and later the Genoese Zaccaria family. The remains of the Frankish castle have been preserved. Ottoman rule lasted until the Greek War of Independence, in which the area was liberated in 1821–1822. Two earthquakes, measuring 5.5 on the Richter scale, struck the municipality on February 5, 2008, causing little damage.

== Notes ==
- Chalandritsa (Η Χαλανδρίτσα), Stefanos Thomopoulos, 1937
- History Of The Cities Of Patras, Volume I & II (Ιστορία της πόλεως Πατρών, Τόμοι Α΄& Β΄ = Istoria tis poleos Patron, Tomi I & II), Stefanos Thomopoulos, Achaikes Ekdoseis ISBN 960-7960-10-6
- Archaies poleis perix tis Olympias (Αρχαίες πόλεις πέριξ της Ολυμπίας = Ancient Cities Beyond Olympia, Vasilis Taktikos, Athanasios Koumartzis, Anadrasi, Athens 2002
- O emfylios polems stin Achaia (Ο εμφύλιος πόλεμος στην Αχαία = The Civil War in Achaia), Vasileios Lazaris, Sygchroni Epochi, Athens, 2006 ISBN 960-451-017-7
