= Isoma, Achaea =

Community in Erymanthos, Achaea, Greece

Isoma Ίσωμα
- Community
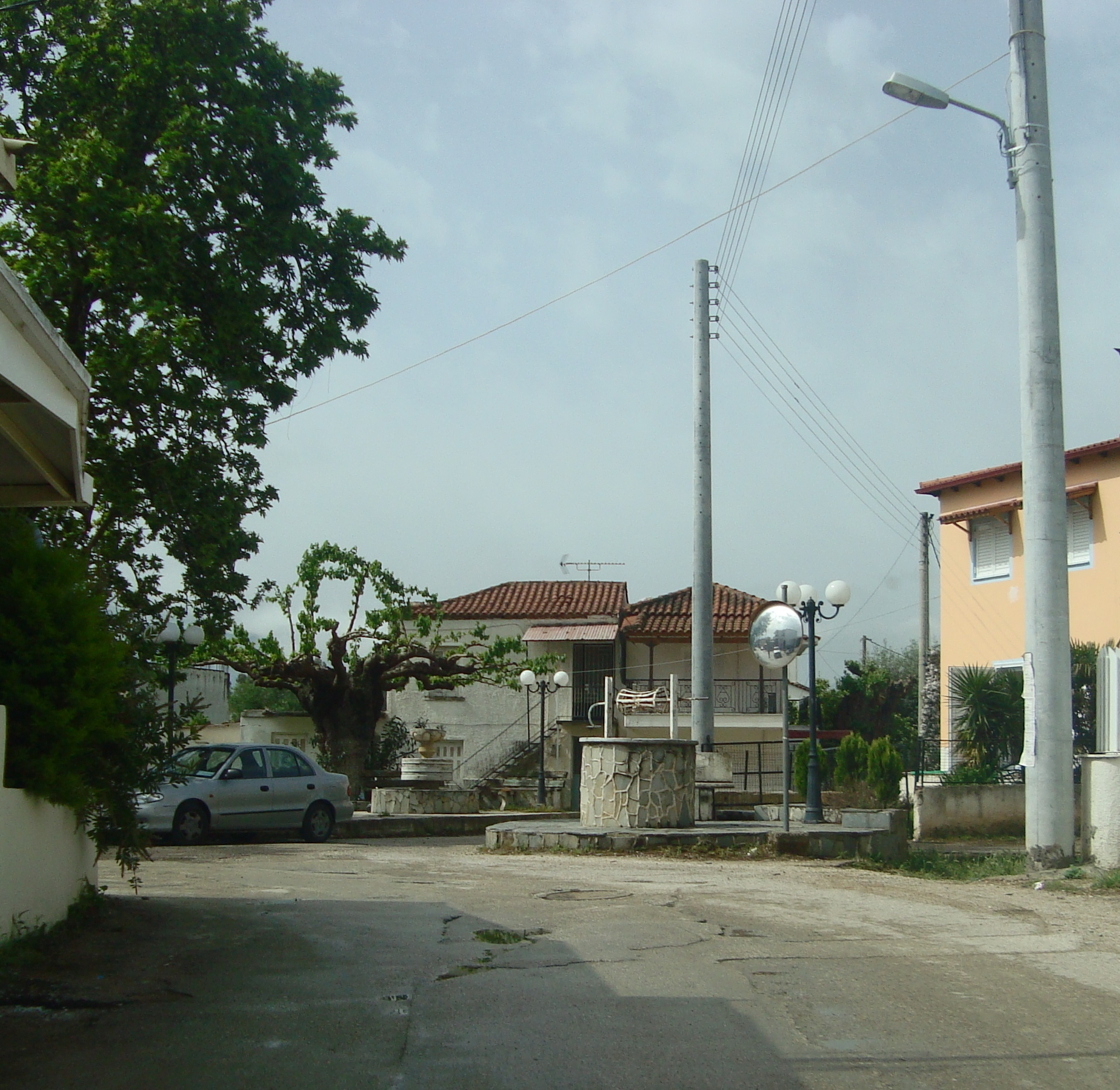

- Location within Greece
- Coordinates: 38°6′N 21°42′E
- Country: Greece
- Administrative region: West Greece
- Regional unit: Achaea
- Municipality: Erymanthos
- Municipal unit: Farres
- Elevation: 110 m (360 ft)

Population (2021)
  - Community: 351
- Time zone: UTC+2 (EET)
  - Summer (DST): UTC+3 (EEST)
- Postal code: 252 00
- Area code: 26240
- Vehicle registration: AX

Isoma (Greek: Ίσωμα) is a village in the municipal unit of Farres, Achaea, Greece. It is 2 km (1.2 mi) northwest of Fares and 16 km (9.9 mi) south of Patras. Isoma is situated in the plain between the rivers Peiros and Parapeiros.

== Population ==
Year	Population
1981	531
1991	509
2001	539
2011	452
2021	351

== See also ==
- List of settlements in Achaea
