= Kalousi =

Community in Erymanthos, Achaea, Greece

Kalousi Καλούσι
- Community
- Location within Greece
- Coordinates: 38°2′N 21°48′E
- Country: Greece
- Administrative region: West Greece
- Regional unit: Achaea
- Municipality: Erymanthos
- Municipal unit: Farres

Area
  - Community: 22.41 km^{2} (8.65 sq mi)
- Elevation: 800 m (2,600 ft)

Population (2021)
  - Community: 166
  - Density: 7.41/km^{2} (19.2/sq mi)
- Time zone: UTC+2 (EET)
  - Summer (DST): UTC+3 (EEST)
- Vehicle registration: AX
- Website: kalousi.webnode.gr (Greek)

Kalousi (Greek: Καλούσι) is a village in the municipality of Erymanthos, Achaea, Greece. It is located in a mountainous area of inland of north Peloponnese peninsula, north-northwest of mount Erymanthos. The village is 9 km south of Chalandritsa and 15 km by road.

== Population ==
| Year | Population |
|---|---|
| 1991 | 276 |
| 2001 | 335 |
| 2011 | 163 |
| 2021 | 166 |

== See also ==
- List of settlements in Achaea
