= Fares (village) =

Community of Erymanthos, Achaea, Greece

Fares Φαρές
- Community
- Location within Greece
- Coordinates: 38°5′N 21°43′E
- Country: Greece
- Administrative region: West Greece
- Regional unit: Achaea
- Municipality: Erymanthos
- Municipal unit: Farres

Population (2021)
  - Community: 500
- Time zone: UTC+2 (EET)
  - Summer (DST): UTC+3 (EEST)
- Vehicle registration: AX

Fares (Greek: Φαρές; Ancient Greek: Φαραί, romanized: Pharai; Latin: Pharae) is a village and a community in the municipal unit of Farres, Achaea, Greek. It is located on the left bank of the river Peiros, 2 km southeast of Isoma and 17 km south of Patras. The community includes the village Prevedos. Prevedos is on the Greek National Road 33 (Patras - Tripoli).

== History ==
Fares is named after the ancient town Pharae, which might be named after the Greek mythological figure Pharis, son of Hermes and the Danaid Philodameia. Pharae was located 150 stadia (28 km) from Patras and 70 stadia (13 km) from the sea, and was built by the banks of the river Peiros. It was part of the Achaean Dynasty and later the Achaean League.

== Population ==
Year	Village population	Community population
1981	495	-
1991	587	-
2001	476	528
2011	466	519
2021	470	500

== See also ==
- List of settlements in Achaea
- Pharae
