= Erymanthian boar =

Mythological boar

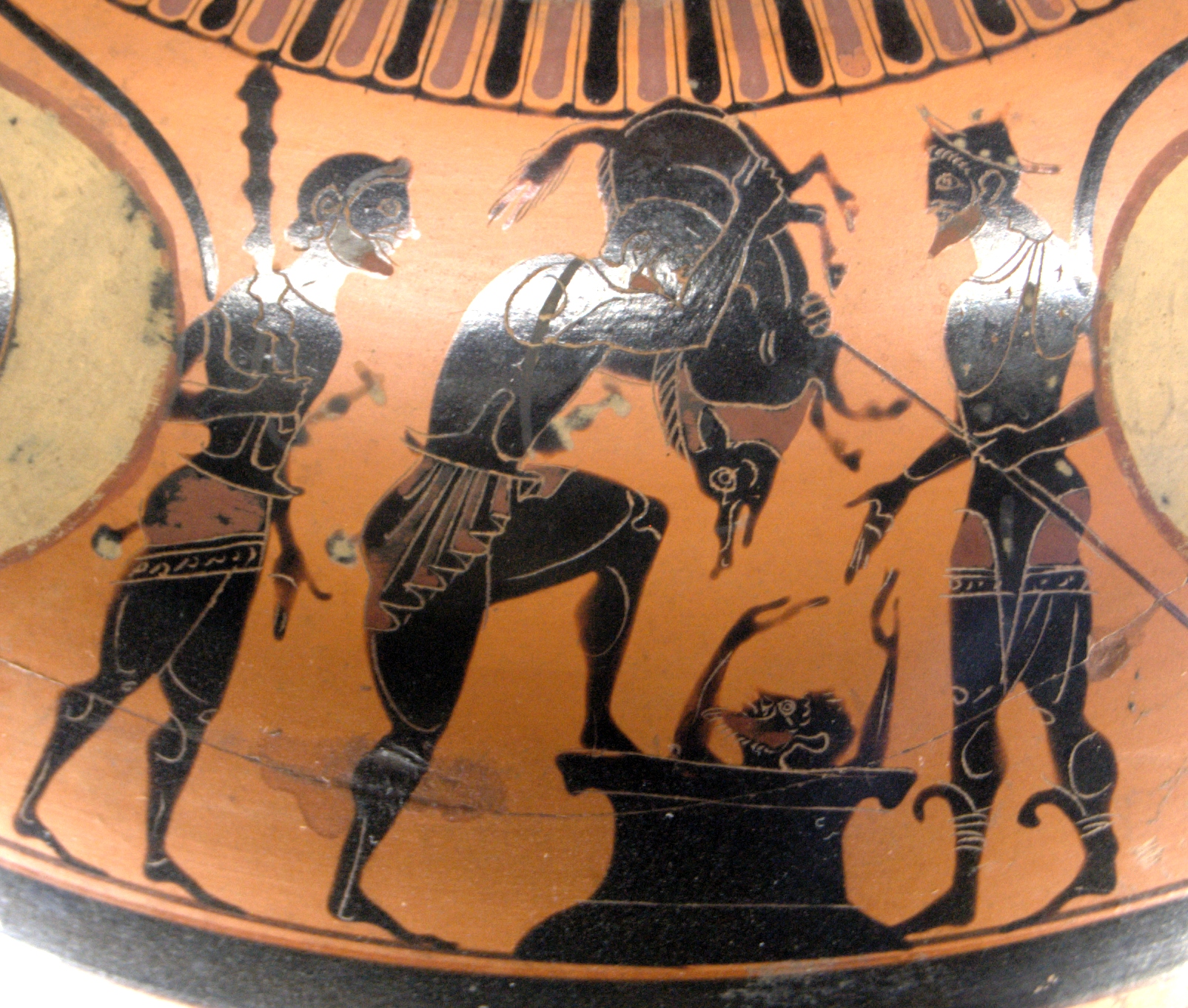
- Heracles, Eurystheus and the Erymanthian boar. Side A from an Ancient Greek black-figured amphora, painted by the Antimenes painter, ca. 525 BC, from Etruria. Louvre Museum, Paris.

Creature information
- Grouping: Legendary creature
- Folklore: Greek mythology

Origin
- Country: Greece
- Habitat: Mount Erymanthos

In Greek mythology, the Erymanthian boar (Greek: ὁ Ἐρυμάνθιος κάπρος; Latin: aper Erymanthius) was a mythical creature that took the form of a "shaggy and wild" "tameless" "boar" "of vast weight" "and foaming jaws". It was a Tegeaean, Maenalusian or Erymanthian boar that lived in the "glens of Lampeia" beside the "vast marsh of Erymanthus". It would sally from the "thick-wooded", "cypress-bearing" "heights of Erymanthus" to "harry the groves of Arcady" and "abuse the land of Psophis".

== Mythology ==
The fourth labour of Heracles was to bring the Erymanthian boar alive to Eurystheus in Mycenae. To capture the boar, Heracles first "chased the boar with shouts" and thereby routed it from a "certain thicket" and then "drove the exhausted animal into deep snow." He then "trapped it", bound it in chains, and lifted it, still "breathing from the dust", and returning with the boar on "his left shoulder", "staining his back with blood from the stricken wound", he cast it down in the "entrance to the assembly of the Mycenaeans", thus completing his fourth labour. "When the king [Eurystheus] saw him carrying the boar on his shoulders, he was terrified and hid himself in a bronze vessel."

"The inhabitants of Cumae, in the land of the Opici, profess that the boar's tusks which are preserved in the sanctuary of Apollo at Cumae are the tusks of the Erymanthian boar, but the assertion is without a shred of probability."

In the primitive highlands of Arcadia, where old practices lingered, the Erymanthian boar was a giant fear-inspiring creature of the wilds that lived on Mount Erymanthos, a mountain that was apparently once sacred to the Mistress of the Animals, for in classical times it remained the haunt of Artemis (Homer, Odyssey, VI.105). A boar was a dangerous animal: "When the goddess turned a wrathful countenance upon a country, as in the story of Meleager, she would send a raging boar, which laid waste the farmers' fields."

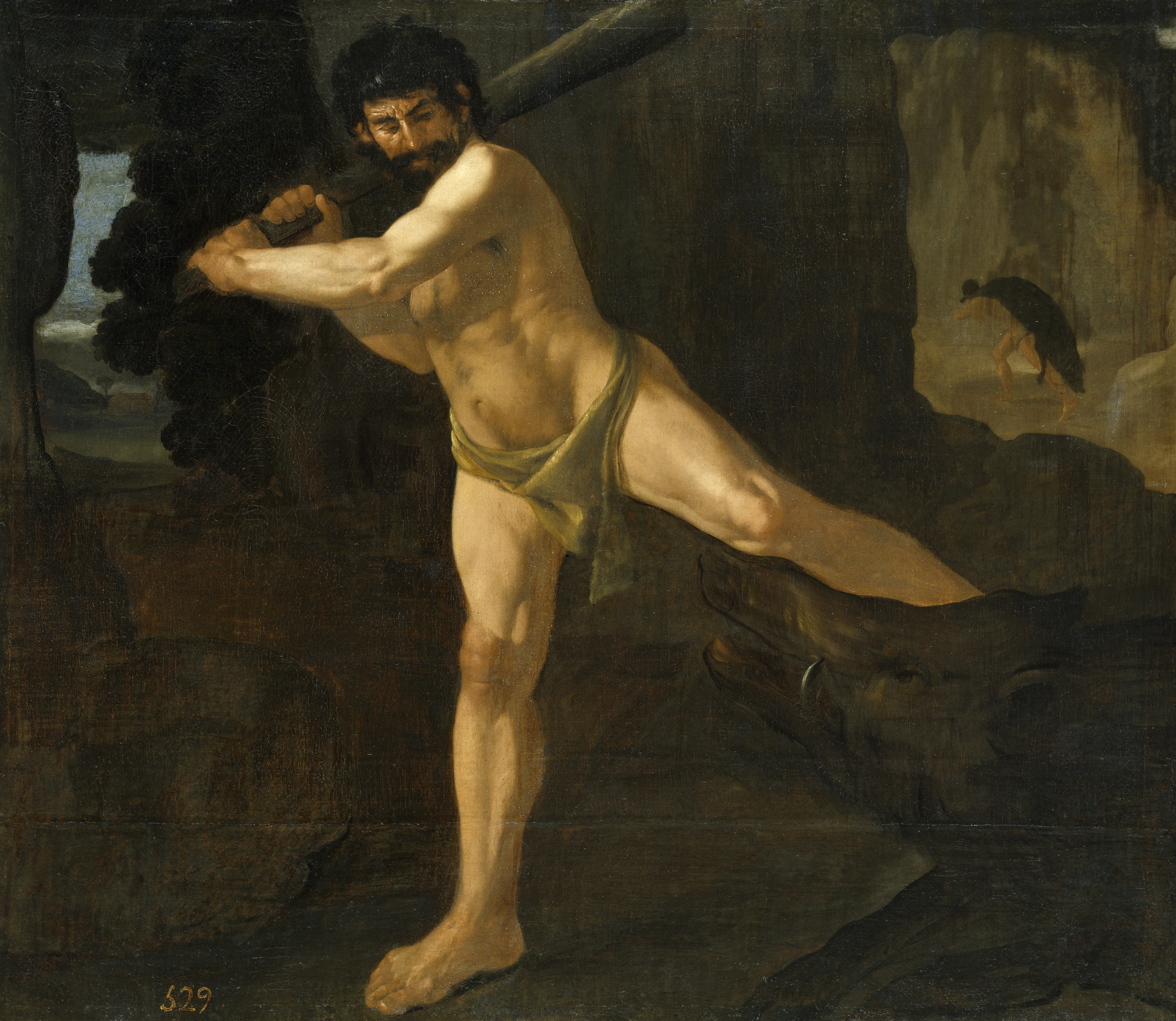
Heracles and the Erymanthian Boar, by Francisco de Zurbarán, 1634 (Museo del Prado)

== Cultural depictions ==
Chronological listing of classical literature sources for the Erymanthian boar:

- Sophocles, Trachiniae 1097 (trans. Jebb) (Greek tragedy C5th BC)
- Apollonius Rhodius, Argonautica 1. 67-111 (trans. Coleridge) (Greek epic poetry C3rd BC)
- Callimachus, Epigrams 36 (trans. Mair) (Greek poetry C3rd BC)
- Diodorus of Sicily, Library of History 4. 12. 1-2 (trans. Oldfather) (Greek history C1st BC)
- Virgil, Aeneid 6. 801 ff (trans. Dewey) (Roman epic poetry C1st BC)
- Lucretius, Of The Nature of Things 5. Proem 1 (trans. Leonard) (Roman philosophy C1st BC)
- Ovid, Metamorphoses 9. 191 (trans. Melville) (Roman epic poetry C1st BC to C1st AD)
- Ovid, Heroides 9. 87 ff (trans. Showerman) (Roman poetry C1st BC to C1st AD)
- Philippus of Thessalonica, The Twelve Labors of Hercules (The Greek Classics ed. Miller Vol 3 1909 p. 397) (Greek epigrams C1st AD)
- Seneca, Hercules Furens 228 ff (trans. Miller) (Roman tragedy C1st AD)
- Seneca, Hercules Oetaeus 17-30 (trans. Miller)
- Statius, Thebaid 4. 297 ff (trans. Mozley) (Roman epic poetry C1st AD)
- Statius, Thebaid 8. 746 ff
- Plutarch, Moralia, On the Fortune of Alexander 341. 11 ff (trans. Babbitt) (Greek philosophy C1st AD to C2nd AD)
- Pseudo-Apollodorus, The Library 2. 5. 3-4 (trans. Frazer) (Greek mythography C2nd AD)
- Pseudo-Hyginus, Fabulae 30 (trans. Grant) (Roman mythography C2nd AD)
- Pausanias, Description of Greece 8 24. 5-6 (trans. Frazer) (Greek travelogue C2nd AD)
- Quintus Smyrnaeus, Fall of Troy 6. 220 ff (trans. Way) (Greek epic poetry C4th AD)
- Nonnus, Dionysiaca 25. 194 (trans. Rouse) (Greek epic poetry C5th AD)
- Nonnos, Dionysiaca 25. 242 ff (trans. Rouse) (Greek epic poetry C5th AD)
- Boethius, The Consolation of Philosophy 4. 7. 13 ff (trans. Rand & Stewart) (Roman philosophy C6th AD)
- Suidas s.v. Dryopes (trans. Suda On Line) (Byzantine Greek Lexicon C10th AD)
- Tzetzes, Chiliades or Book of Histories 2. 268 ff (trans. Untila et al.) (Byzantinian history C12 AD)
- Tzetzes, Chiliades or Book of Histories 2. 494 ff

It has also appeared in modern media, including Hades II and Assassin's Creed Odyssey.

== See also ==
- Calydonian boar hunt
- List of mythological pigs
