= Alepochori =

Alepochori (Greek: Αλεποχώρι, lit. 'fox village') may refer to the following places in Greece:

- Alepochori, Achaea, a village in the municipal unit of Tritaia, Achaea
- Alepochori, Arcadia, a village in the municipal unit of Skiritida, Arcadia
- Alepochori, Evros, a village in the municipal unit of Metaxades, Evros
- Alepochori, Ioannina, a village in the municipal unit of Lakka Souliou, Ioannina
- Alepochori, Laconia, a village in the municipal unit of Geronthres, Laconia

== See also ==
- Alpochori, Elis
