= Katarraktis =

Community in Erymanthos, Achaea, Greece

Katarraktis Καταρράκτης
- Community
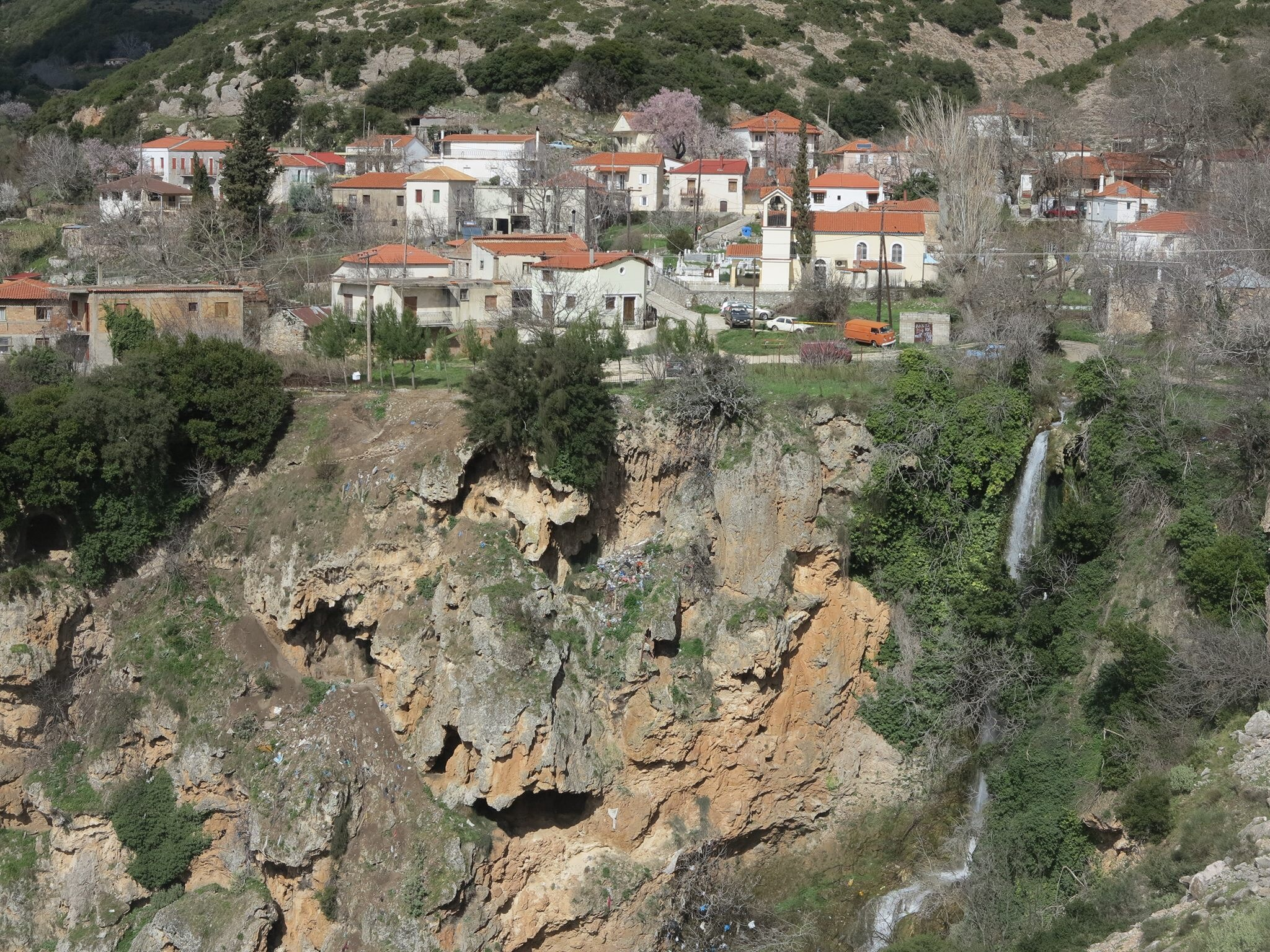
- Katarraktis village view.

- Location within Greece
- Coordinates: 38°6′N 21°50′E
- Country: Greece
- Administrative region: West Greece
- Regional unit: Achaea
- Municipality: Erymanthos
- Municipal unit: Farres
- Elevation: 590 m (1,940 ft)

Population (2021)
  - Community: 73
- Time zone: UTC+2 (EET)
  - Summer (DST): UTC+3 (EEST)
- Postal code: 250 08
- Vehicle registration: AX

Katarraktis (Greek: Καταρράκτης, meaning "waterfall") (before 1928: Lopesi, in Greek: Λόπεσι) is a mountain village in the municipal unit of Farres in the municipality of Erymanthos in Achaea, Greece. It is 5 km east of Chalandritsa and 20 km southeast of Patras. The village is situated near a 110 meters high waterfall, hence the name of the village. Relics from the Mycenean period can be found in the vicinity.

== Population ==
Year	Population
1981	144
1991	193
2001	101
2011	93
2021	73

== See also ==
- List of settlements in Achaea
