= Agios Ioannis o Prodromos Church, Spodiana =

Agios Ioannis o Prodromos Church
- Ιερός Ναός Αγίου Ιωάννη του Προδρόμου
- 38°2′32″N 21°49′52″E
- Location: Chrysopigi (Spodiana)
- Country: Greece
- Language: Greek
- Denomination: Greek Orthodox

History
- Status: Open

Architecture
- Completed: old church: unknown new church: 1884

Administration
- Metropolis: Metropolis of Patras

The Agios Ioannis o Prodromos Church (Greek: Ιερός Ναός Αγίου Ιωάννη του Προδρόμου) is an Orthodox Christian church located in the northern Peloponnese, in the mountainous Achaia, specifically in the area of Chrysopigi (especially known under the older name of Spodiana).

It is dedicated to Saint John the Forerunner, great prophet of Christianity and baptist of Jesus Christ and is celebrated every year on August 29, the day of the Dormition and Dissection of his Sacred Head.

== Location ==
The church is built in a mountainous location, on the steep slopes of Erymanthos in its northern part, about 2 km from the village of Chrysopigi and at an altitude of 810 meters above sea level. It stands in a prominent position, mainly among holly and fir trees and next to a large rock that once had the form of a cave.

Administratively it belongs to the Community of Chrysopigi of the Municipality of Erymanthos and ecclesiastically to the Parish of Chrysopigi of the Holy Diocese of Patras.

It is approximately 16 km. from Chalandritsa, 38 km. from Patras and 44 km. from Kalavryta via the local network.

In essence there are two temples on the same site, one right next to the other, of which the younger one is fully functional today. The old church belongs to the category of single-chamber vaulted churches without a dome and the year of its construction and foundation remains unknown. It is reported that this church is built inside a cave and was probably a hermitage. Today this cave in its then form does not exist. Inside there are frescoes of "Nezerite style", many of which are preserved in excellent condition, while there are also some desecrated by the swords of the Ottoman conquerors. According to the locals and local tradition the interior walls have been plastered and painted three times.

Next to the older church later, specifically on August 19, 1884, the newest church was built, larger in size, and which today is the patron saint of Chrysopigi. Together they constitute an important historical-religious site and an admirable point of reference for the village, as well as the entire wider region and in general.

== Sources ==
=== Bibliography ===
- Σπυρίδων Ν. Γκουρβέλος, «Εν ταις των Νεζερών κώμαις». Ιστορία των Νεζερών, εκδ. Γραφικές Τέχνες Πέτρος Κούλης, Πάτρα 2007. ISBN 978-960-930162-6.
- Θεόδωρος Η. Λουλούδης, Αχαΐα. Οικισμοί, οικιστές, αυτοδιοίκηση, Νομαρχιακή Επιχείρηση Πολιτιστικής Ανάπτυξης Ν.Α. Αχαΐας, Πάτρα 2010.
- Κώστας Ν. Τριανταφύλλου, Ιστορικόν Λεξικόν των Πατρών, Τόμος Β', Τυπογραφείο Πέτρου Χρ. Κούλη, Πάτρα 1995, Τρίτη Έκδοση.
