= Nebria holtzi =

Scientific classification
- Domain: Eukaryota
- Kingdom: Animalia
- Phylum: Arthropoda
- Class: Insecta
- Order: Coleoptera
- Suborder: Adephaga
- Family: Carabidae
- Genus: Nebria
- Species: N. holtzi

Binomial name
- Nebria holtzi K. Daniel, 1903

Species of beetle

Nebria holtzi is a species of ground beetle in the Nebriinae subfamily that can be found on Mount Erymanthos in Greece.
