= Leontio =

Community in Erymanthos, Achaea, Greece

Leontio Λεόντιο
- Municipal unit
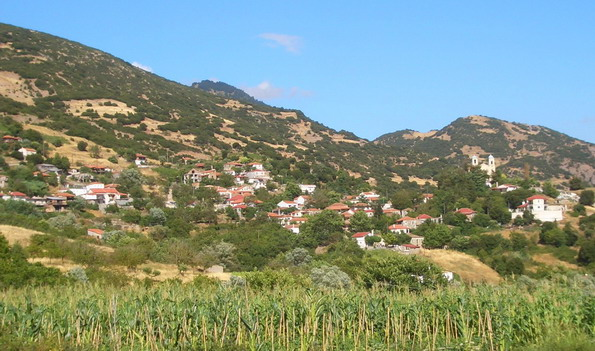

- Location within the regional unit

- Location within Greece
- Coordinates: 38°7′N 21°55′E
- Country: Greece
- Administrative region: West Greece
- Regional unit: Achaea
- Municipality: Erymanthos
- Districts: 3

Area
  - Municipal unit: 71.59 km^{2} (27.64 sq mi)
- Highest elevation: 1,400 m (4,600 ft)
- Lowest elevation: 772 m (2,533 ft)

Population (2021)
  - Municipal unit: 477
  - Municipal unit density: 6.66/km^{2} (17.3/sq mi)
  - Community: 394
- Time zone: UTC+2 (EET)
  - Summer (DST): UTC+3 (EEST)
- Postal code: 250 08
- Vehicle registration: AX
- Website: leontio.gr

Leontio (Greek: Λεόντιο, romanized: Leóntio, before 1923: Γουρζούμισα, Gourzoúmisa) is a mountain village and a former municipality in the municipality of Erymanthos, Achaea, West Greece, Greece. Since the 2011 local government reform it is part of the municipality Erymanthos, of which it is a municipal unit. The municipal unit has an area of 71.586 km^{2}. It is situated in the southern foothills of the Panachaiko, 13 km east of Chalandritsa, 22 km southeast of Patras, 20 km southwest of Aigio and 19 km northwest of Kalavryta. Its population in 2021 was 394 for the community and 477 for the municipal unit. The village was renamed after the ancient town of Leontium, the remains of which lie nearby.

== Subdivisions ==
The municipal unit Leontio is subdivided into the following communities (constituent villages in brackets):

- Ano Mazaraki
- Demesticha
- Leontio (Leontio, Vetaiika, Golemi, Thomaiika, Katsaitaiika, Kounavaiika, Ovryokambos)

== Population ==
Year	Population community	Population municipal unit
2001	395	514
2011	284	335
2021	394	477

== History ==
Evidence suggests that the Achaeans settled Leontio after the Trojan Wars, at this time it was a Polis. This is supported by archeological excavations in the area by the archaeologist N. Kiparisis during the period 1931–32. Mycenean tombs from the 14th-12th century BC were found. The different artifacts excavated in a number of ancient cemeteries confirmed the Polis flourished at about 1,000 BC. Though older findings date it back to 3,000-2,000 BC. The acropolis dates back to around the 3rd century BC.

It was located on the ancient border of Achaea and Arcadia near Vlasia where excavations uncovered a Mycenean tomb and an ancient theater from the 4th century BC. The temple of Artemis was located along the ancient road which led to Arcadia. Its length was 35 m and its width was 11 m.

The city was destroyed at the end of the 3rd century BC by Philip V Macedon. Leontio controlled several places including Chios and Leontopoda. The area followed the fate of the rest of Achaea.
