= Isoma =

Isoma (Greek: Ίσωμα) may refer to several places in Greece:

- Isoma, Achaea, a town in Achaea
- Isoma, Kilkis, a town in the municipal unit Kroussa
- Isoma Karyon, a town in Arcadia

== See also ==
- Isomata (disambiguation)
