= Parapeiros =

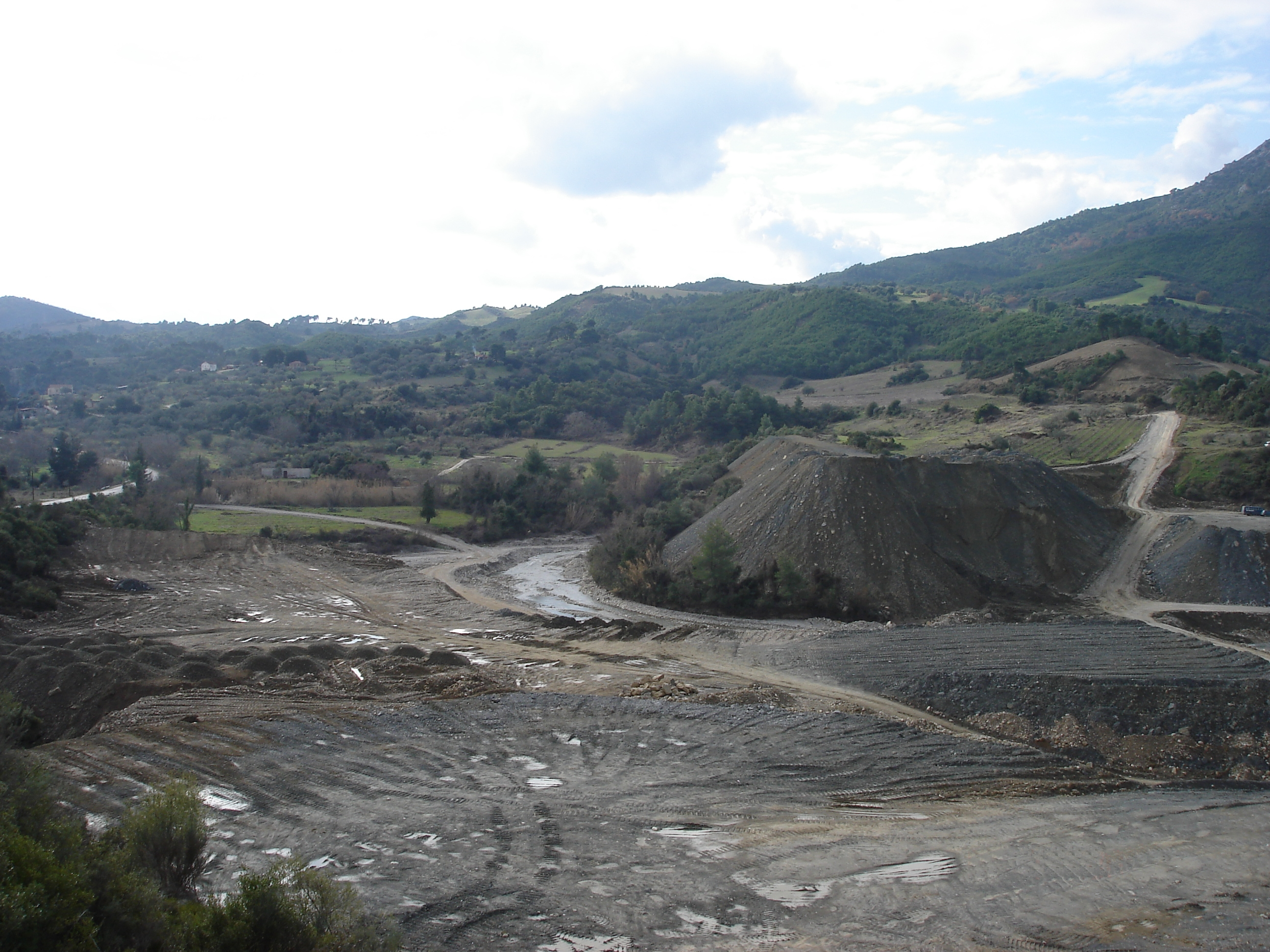
- Native name: Παραπείρος (Greek)

Location
- Country: Greece
- Region: Achaea

Physical characteristics
- Source
  - location: Mount Erymanthos
- Mouth
  - location: Peiros
  - coordinates: 38°7′34″N 21°38′30″E
- Length: 28.5 km (17.7 mi)

Basin features
- Progression: Peiros→ Ionian Sea

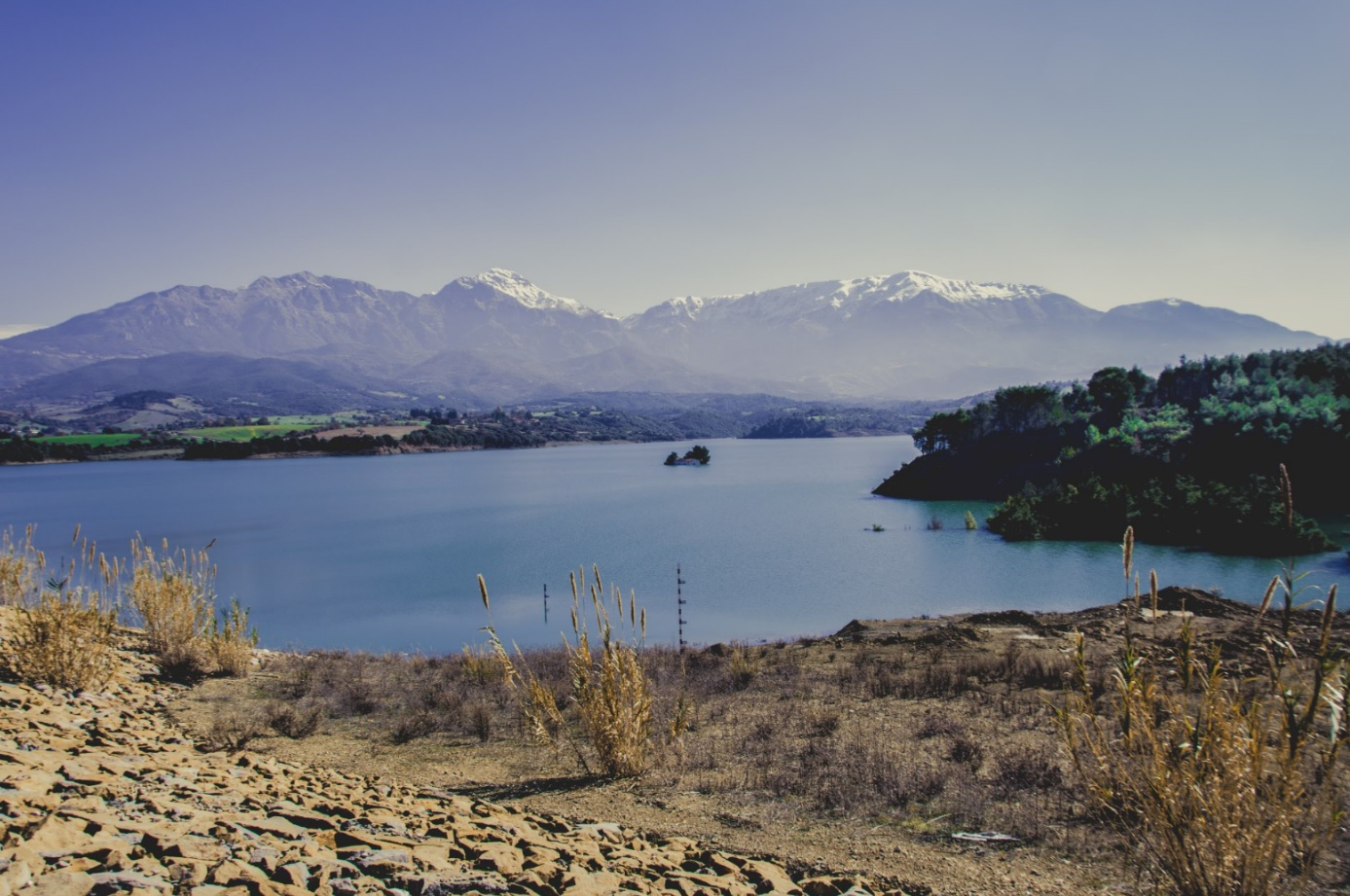
Asteri Dam or Parapiros Dam. View of the dam lake. The temporary islet with Saint Theodores' chapel of Mitopolis village sinking.

The Parapeiros (Greek: Παραπείρος, also Τυθεύς - Tythefs, Ancient Greek: Τευθέας - Teutheas) is a river in the western part of Achaea, Greece. It is 28.5 km (17.7 mi) long. The Parapeiros begins in the western part of the Erymanthos mountains close to Alepochori. It passes through the municipal units of Tritaia and Farres. It empties into the river Peiros near the village Agios Stefanos.
