= Kalentzi =

Municipal unit and village in Achaea, Greece

Kalentzi Καλέντζι
- Municipal unit
- Location within the regional unit

- Location within Greece
- Coordinates: 37°59′N 21°42′E
- Country: Greece
- Geographic region: Peloponnese
- Administrative region: West Greece
- Regional unit: Achaea
- Municipality: Erymanthos

Area
  - Municipal unit: 23.91 km^{2} (9.23 sq mi)
- Elevation: 457 m (1,499 ft)

Population (2021)
  - Municipal unit: 276
  - Municipal unit density: 11.5/km^{2} (29.9/sq mi)
- Time zone: UTC+2 (EET)
  - Summer (DST): UTC+3 (EEST)
- Vehicle registration: ΑΧ

Kalentzi (Greek: Καλέντζι) is a village and a former community in Achaea, West Greece, Greece. Since the 2011 local government reform it is part of the municipality Erymanthos, of which it is a municipal unit. The municipal unit has an area of 23.907 km^{2}. The population of the municipal unit is 276 (2021). It is renowned in Greece as the ancestral home of the Papandreou political dynasty. Kalentzi is situated on the northern slope of Mount Erymanthos, about 35 km south of Patras.

== Subdivisions ==
The municipal unit Kalentzi is subdivided into the following villages:

- Kalentzi
- Agios Georgios
- Diaselo (also known as Avrami)
- Bantsaiika

== Election results ==
Election	Turnout	ND	PASOK	SYRIZA	KKE	Other
Jun 2023	58.43	10.93	60.77	14.47	1.61	12.22 (Note: Niki 3.54 Spartiates 3.22 PE 1.93 EL 1.61 Other 1.92)
May 2023	73.03	14.03	49.61	27.27	1.30	7.79 (Note: EL 1.82 Niki 1.56 EX 1.04 Other 3.37)
2019	68.74	14.56	46.36	30.19	1.35	7.54 (Note: EL 2.70 Μ25 2.70 Other 2.14)
Sep 2015	64.60	10.56	32.78	35.00	3,06	18.60 (Note: XA 4.72 Potami 4.44 LAE 3.89 ANEL 2.50 Other 3.05)
Jan 2015	75.38	4.57	5.02	23.74	2.74	63.93 (Note: KIDISO 53.65 ANEL 3.65 Potami 1.83 XA 1.60 Teleia 1.60 Other 1.60)
Jun 2012	67.05	6.44	63.61	13.61	2.97	13.37 (Note: DIMAR 4.95 XA 3.71 ANEL 1.73 KPE 1.24 Other 1.74)
May 2012	74.30	4.32	60.45	7.95	4.09	23.19 (Note: KOISY 5.45 DIMAR 3.64 XA 2.95 OP 2.50 ANEL 1.82 LAOS 1.59 DISY 1.36 KPE 1.36 Other 2.52)
2009	88.16	3.73	94.14	0.18	1.42	0.53
2007	90.78	6.60	90.52	0.68	1.18	1.02
2004	81.28	7.97	88.78	0.81	1.95	0.49
2000	84.20	8.18	89.05	0.15 (Note: as Syn)	0.73	1.89 (Note: DIKKI 1.61 Other 0.28)
1996	85.36	10.07	83.36	0.88	0.88	4.81 (Note: DIKKI 3.65 POLAN 1.02 Other 0.14)
1993	87.82	5.82	93.16	0.00	0.58	0.44
1990	88.80	8.73	88.46	1.48		1.33 (Note: DIANA 1.04 Other 0.29)
Nov 1989	89.56	9.54	89.02	0.87		0.57
Jun 1989	90.33	8.08	88.40	1.32		2.20 (Note: DIANA 1.62 Other 0.58)
1985	85.80	5.38	93.31	0.00 (Note: as KKE-Es)	1.16	0.15
1981	86.57	3.34	95.90	0.00	0.76	0.00
1977	86.87	6.97	92.35	0.17 (Note: as Symmachia)	0.34	0.17
1974	88.52	10.91	87.99	0.18		0.92

== Notable people ==
- Georgios Papandreou (1888–1968) politician
