= Isomata =

Isomata may refer to:

- Idyllwild School of Music and the Arts
- Isomata, Samos, a village in the municipal unit Marathokampos, Greece
- Isomata, Evrytania, a village in the municipality Karpenisi, Greece

== See also ==
- Isoma (disambiguation)
