= Alepochori, Achaea =

Community of Erymanthos, Achaea, Greece

Alepochori Αλεποχώρι
- Settlement
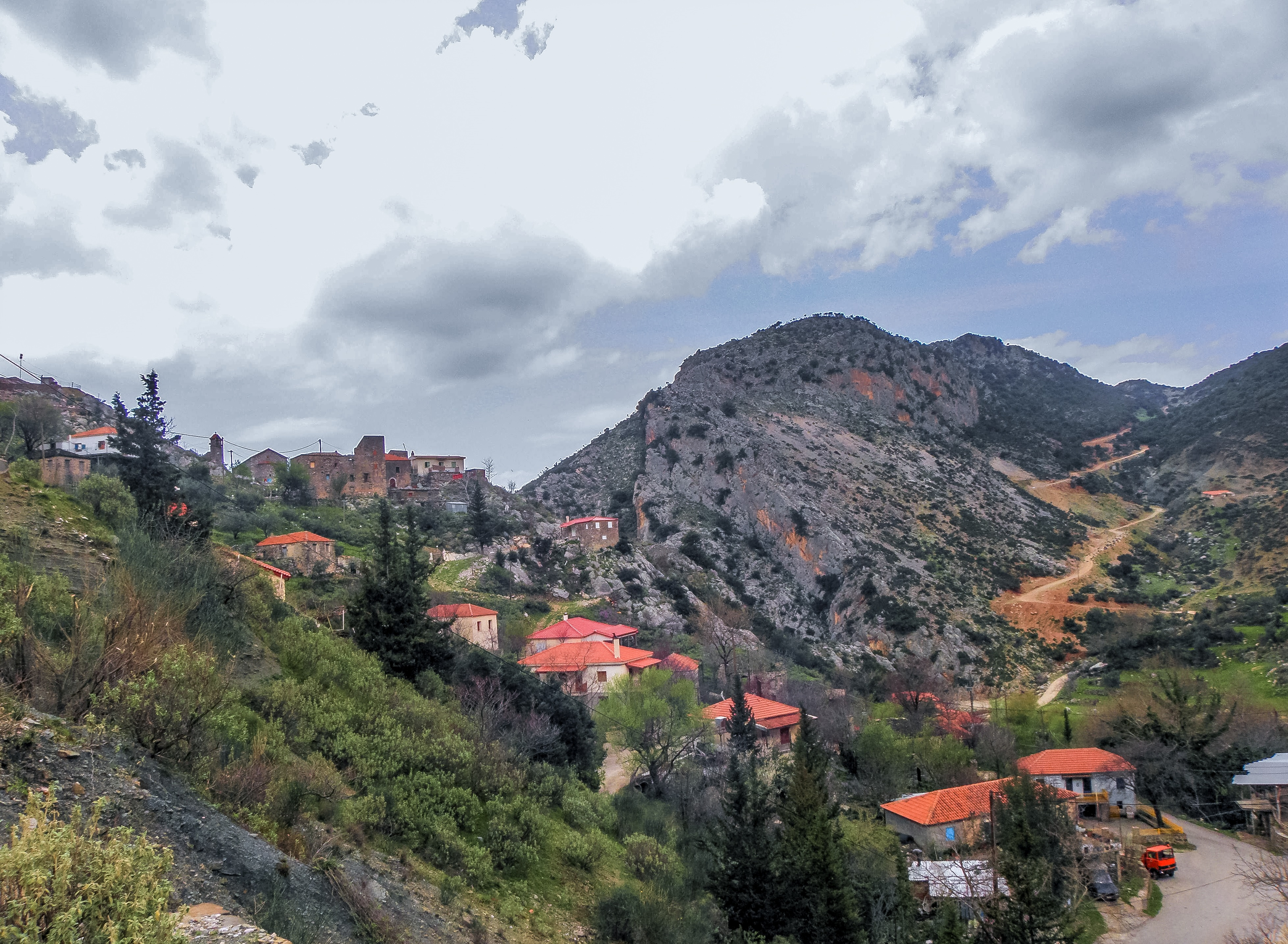

- Location within Greece
- Coordinates: 37°58′N 21°47′E
- Country: Greece
- Administrative region: West Greece
- Regional unit: Achaea
- Municipality: Erymanthos
- Municipal unit: Tritaia
- Elevation: 506 m (1,660 ft)

Population (2021)
  - Community: 230
- Time zone: UTC+2 (EET)
  - Summer (DST): UTC+3 (EEST)
- Postal code: 251 00
- Vehicle registration: AX

Alepochori (Greek: Αλεποχώρι) is a village and a community in southern Achaea, Greece. Alepochori is located on the northern slope of Mount Erymanthos, about 35 km south of Patras. The community includes the village Agios Dimitrios.

== Population ==
Year	Village population	Community population
1690s	111	-
1981	-	379
1991	143	570
2001	188	424
2011	99	236
2021	131	230

== History ==
The area followed the fate of the rest of Achaea. Between 1460 and 1821 the area was ruled by the Ottoman Turks, except a brief period of Venetian rule between 1687 and 1715. In the Venetian censuses of 1697 and 1699 the village was called Alpochori Trano (Αλποχώρι Τρανό) and had 111 inhabitants, in 1700, it had 38 families. Alepochori became Greek after the Greek War of Independence of 1821.

Alepochori was part of the municipality of Erymanthia between 1835 and 1841, and of the municipality of Tritaia between 1841 and 1912. It was an independent community between 1912 and 1998, and became part of Tritaia again in 1998. At the 2010 Kallikratis reform, it became part of the new municipality Erymanthos.

== See also ==
- List of settlements in Achaea
