= B. H. Katarki =

Bhimareddy Hanumareddy Katarki (born 3 January 1924) is an Indian agricultural scientist specializing in cotton. During the 1970s, he was inspired by the success of Hybrid-4, Cotton by Dr. C. T. Patel, of Surat Research Station. Dr. Katarki also made a groundbreaking discovery of Varalaxmi, and DCH-32 Cotton varieties, at the Dharwad Agricultural University (Karnataka).

== Childhood and Education ==
Shri. Katarki completed B.Sc. (Agri.) 1945 Bombay); B.Sc. (Agri.) 1963 (IARI, New Delhi) and D.Sc. (Karnataka, Dharwad) 1975.

== Teacher and Researcher ==
Served in various capacities:

- Department of Agriculture, (1954–1965)
- University of Agricultural Sciences, at Bangalore, and Dharwad from, 1965–1983.
- Post graduate teacher and Zonal Coordinator of South Zone from 1980 to 1983.
- member of ISCI, and R & D Sub-Committees, at Bombay, from 1980 to 1982.

== Professional affiliations ==
- Fellow of the Indian Society of Genetic and Plant Breeding.
- Member of Indian Society of Cotton Improvement.(ISCI )
- Member of Scientific Panel for Plant Breeding ICAR, New Delhi from 1979 to 1983.
- Member of Governing Board of Karnataka State Seed Certification Agency from 1981 to 1983.
- Member of the Central State Farm Advisory Committee, in Karnataka, from 1979 to 1981
- Life member of Institute for Studies on Agriculture and Rural Development Dharwad, since 1982.

== Achievements ==
- Identified and released Extra long staple specific Tetra Ploid Cotton- Varalaxmi, in the year 1972.
- DCH-32 in the year 1981, for Commercial Production in Southern and Central Cotton Belts of India- Capable of Spinning up to 80s and 90s counts.
- DS-56 and DS-59 (in G. hirsutum L), DB-3-12 (G.herbacium L), in the year 1982 for rain- fed fields.

== Honours ==
- In 1965 and 1984, The Gold medal from the Government of Karnataka.
- In 1972, Citation from the UAS, Bangalore.
- In 1974, Honour from The Karnataka State Farmers' Forum.
- In 1976, ICAR Gold medal.
- In 1976, National tonnage club of farmers.
- In 1976, The Indian Merchant Chambers Award.
- In 1977 Federation of Indian Chambers of Commerce and Industry.
- In 1981, Vasvik Industrial Research Award for outstanding achievements in the field of Agricultural Science and Technology.
- In 2007, ISCI, Mumbai's Hon. Fellowship Award, in appreciation of his valuable contribution towards improving the Production and Quality of Interspecific Hybrid cottons in India.
- EICA, UAS Alumni Association Bangalore, Andhra Pradesh State level Seed Growers, Merchants and Nurserymen Association.
- In 2004, Lifetime achievement Award by UAS Dharwad, Karnataka State.
