= Pharae =

Ancient name of modern Fares, Achaea, Greece

Coordinates: 38°04′55″N 21°43′48″E

Pharae (Ancient Greek: Φαραί), otherwise known as Phara (Φᾶρα), and Pherae, was a town and polis (city-state), situated by the Peiros River, approximately 11 kilometres (6.8 mi) from the sea and 23.5 kilometres (14.6 mi) from the town of Patras, in what is now southern Greece. It was one of the twelve Achaean cities, and one of the four major cities which spearheaded the restoration of the Achaean League in 280 BC.

In an event called the Social War (220–217 BC), it suffered from various setbacks caused by the attacks of the Aetolians and Eleans. Its territory was later annexed by Augustus, and after the Battle of Actium, it was made a colony of Rome.

As of the 19th century, Pharae still contained a large agora with a statue of Hermes. The modern village Fares was named after Pharae.

Map of ancient Achaea (with place names in Greek)

== See also ==
- List of ancient Greek cities
- Fares (village)
