= Stefanos Thomopoulos =

Greek writer and historian

Stefanos Thomopoulos Στέφανος Θωμόπουλος
- Born: 11 April 1859; Patras, Greece
- Died: 31 July 1939 (age 80); Patras, Greece
- Occupations: writer, historian of Patras

Stefanos Thomopoulos (Greek: Στέφανος Θωμόπουλος, 11 April 1859 – 31 July 1939) was a Greek writer and historian, who wrote especially on the history of Patras and its surrounding region.

He was the son of the notary Nikolaos Thomopoulos, and was born at 74 Ermou Street in Patras. He graduated the local Gymnasium (High School), where, at the age of 12, he wrote in the school newspaper, while in 1879, he came first in an essay contest on the history of the city.

He studied law in Athens, where he completed his doctorate in 1885. After service in the army, he returned to his native city to practice law. In 1911, he was appointed to a post at the National Library of Greece following a competition, where he worked until his retirement in 1933. In 1913, following the Balkan Wars, he was sent by the Ministry of Education to Macedonia to register the library collections in cities and monasteries in the areas of Florina, Korçë, Monastir and Kozani. He died on 31 July 1939.

== Works ==
Thomopoulos was greatly interested in his native city and its history, and was one of the first modern Greek historians, along with Dimitrios Kambouroglou, to research and write on the history of their home cities. In 1888, at the age of 29, Thomopoulos published his first work, the first volume of his History of the City of Patras. Throughout his life he wrote many articles, studies and essays about Patras and wrote regularly for local newspapers.

Other works include:

Year	Book	Transliteration and translation
1883	Χριστιανικαί εν Πάτραι επιγραφαί	Christianikai en Patrai epigrafai Christian inscriptions in Patras
1903	Η ιερά μονή Ομπλού εν Πάτραις	I iera moni Omblou en Patrais; The Omblou Monastery at Patras
1922	Ο Παλαιών Πατρών Θεοφάνης	O Palain Patron Theofanis; Bishop Theofanis of Old Patras
1928	Ο μέγας Δέρκων Γρηγόριος	O megas Derkon Grigorios; The great metropolitan Gregorios of Derka
1937	Η Χαλανδρίτσα	I Halandritsa; Chalandritsa
1938	Ο Λουδοβίκος Στόιμπ εν Πάτραις	O Loudovikos Stoib en Patrais; Ludwig Steub in Patras
1939	Περί Κερπινής	Peri Kerpinis; On Kerpini

== Sources ==
- History of the City of Patras (Ιστορία της πόλεως Πατρών ), Volumes I and II, Stefanos Thomopoulos, Achaikes Ekdoseis, ISBN 960-7960-10-6
- History of the City (Ιστορία της πόλης), Peri Technon Publications, Patras, 2004, ISBN 960-88372-0-0
