= Katarki-Gudlanur =

Village in India

Katarki-Gudlanur Katharaki Gudlanur, Katarkigudlanur
- Village
- Location within Karnataka Location within India
- Coordinates: 15°13′38″N 076°06′39″E
- Country: India
- State: Karnataka
- District: Koppal district
- Taluka: Koppal

Languages
  - Official: Kannada
- Time zone: UTC+5:30 (IST)

Katarki-Gudlanur is a panchayat village in the southern state of Karnataka, India. Administratively, Katarki-Gudlanur is under Koppal Taluka of Koppal District in Karnataka. The village of Katarki-Gudlanur is 19 km by road south of the town of Koppal and 33 km by road east of Mundargi. Katarki-Gudlanur is on the north shore of the Tungabhadra Reservoir.

== Divisions ==
The Katharaki Gudlanur gram panchayat oversees three villages: Katarkigudlanur, Belur, and Dombarhalli.

== Demographics ==
As of 2010, the village of Katarki-Gudlanur had 4,685 inhabitants.
