= Mount Erymanthos =

Mountain range in the Peloponnese, Greece

- Ὄρος Ερύμανθος
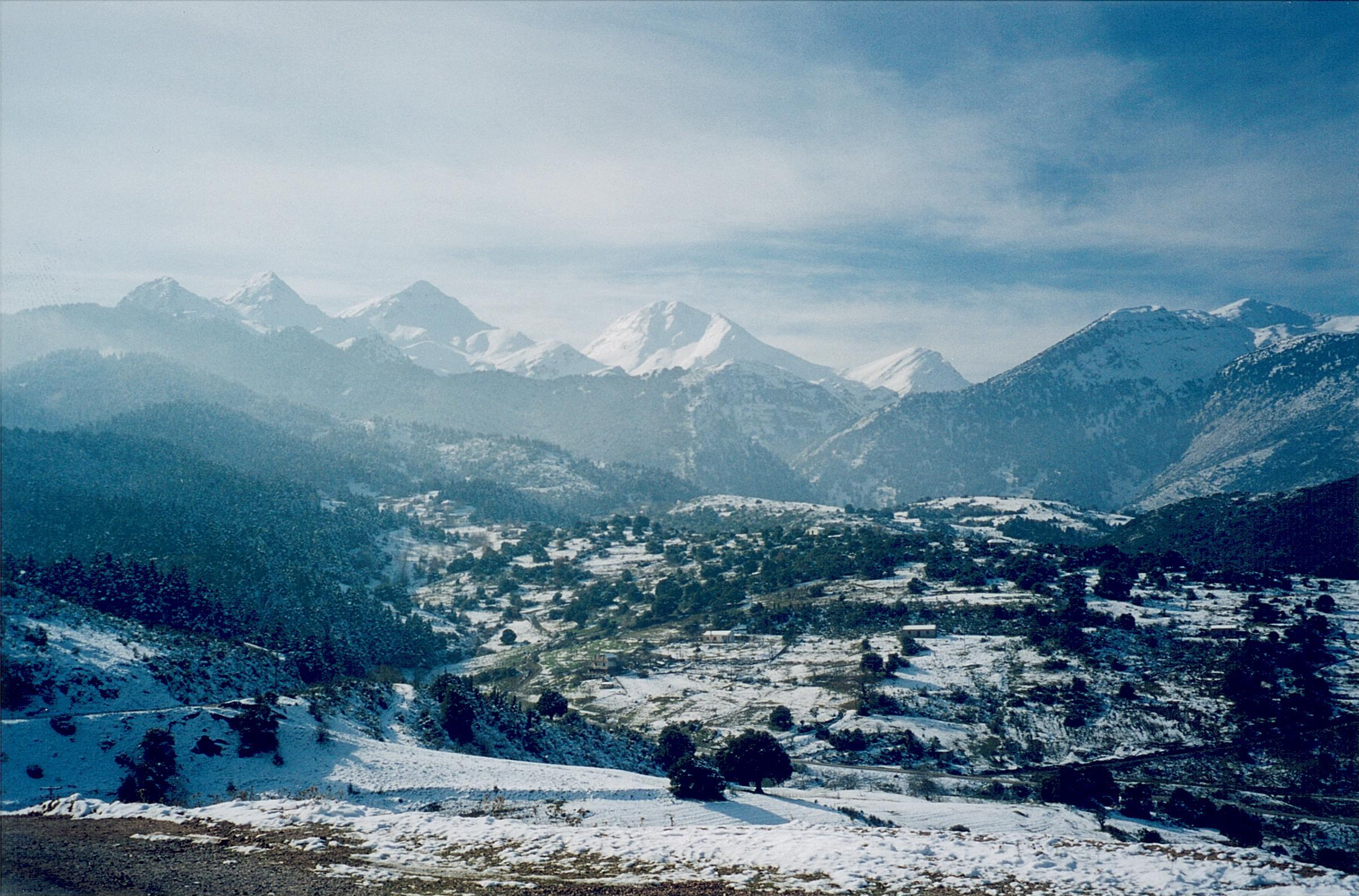
- The snow-capped peaks of Erymanthos in winter, seen from the northeast (in Achaea). Olenos is to the left hidden behind the north slopes. The peaks have no snow in summer. Most are above the tree line.

Highest point
- Peak: Olenos
- Elevation: 2,224 m (7,297 ft)
- Prominence: 1,205 m (3,953 ft)
- Parent peak: Mount Kyllini
- Isolation: 31.2 km (19.4 mi)
- Listing: Ribu
- Coordinates: 37°58′N 21°50′E

Dimensions
- Length: 28 km (17 mi) NE-SW
- Width: 16 km (9.9 mi) NW-SE

Naming
- Pronunciation: Greek: [eˈrimanθos]

Geography
- Location: West central Achaia, 40 km south of Patras
- Parent range: Erymanthos

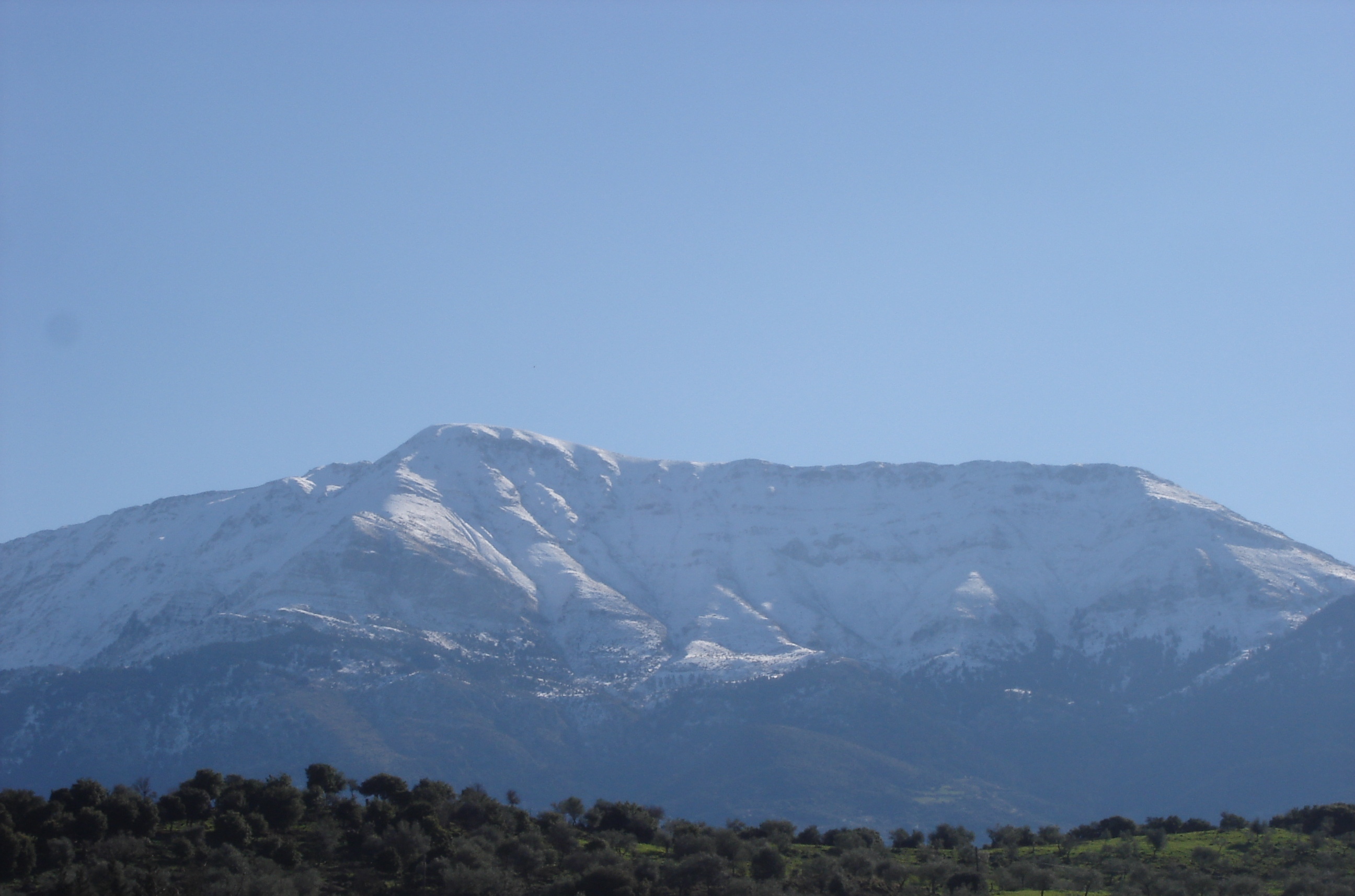
The ridge of Olenos, otherwise known as Mount Erymanthos. View from the west. Olenos is on the north, here the left, and Granitis is on the south. The lower peak, Erymanthos, is out of sight on the right.

Mount Erymanthos (Greek: Ερύμανθος, Latin: Erymanthus) overall is an irregular massif of peaks connected by ridges embedded in the mountains located in the north of the Peloponnese, Greece. Erymanthos is on the west side. Its highest peak, Olenos or Olonos (Ωλενός or Ωλονός), Olenos original and preferred, elevation 2,224 m (7,297 ft), is often called Mount Erymanthus, and conversely, Mount Olenos can be used for the entire range, although the customary usage is Erymanthos for the range and Olenos for the peak.

== Geographical features ==
Olenos is not a single peak. The topography close-up depicts a three-peak complex, three main peaks, of course, as any terrain presents many bumps under various descriptions. The summit is a N-S directed ridge with Olenos on the north, and another peak, Granitis, elevation 2,192 m (7,192 ft), 32 m (105 ft) lower, on the south. Olenos is at 37.988197°N 21.83422°E. Granitis is at 37.986724°N 21.834143°E. The horizontal difference between peaks is 166 m (182 yd). The key col (Note: Low point of highest connecting ridge.) of Granitis is 38 m (42 yd) to the NE. The prominence of Granitis (Note: Vertical distance from peak to key col.) is 4 m (13 ft). Many superficial maps confuse Granitis and Olenos.

It being clear that between any two peaks there is a key col, (Note: Even in unridgelike terrain, such as the surface of the ocean.) a topographical island is defined as the terrain above the plane of the two closed contour lines tangent at the key col. Olenos and Granitis are an island. If the summit of one closed contour line is greater than the summit over the tangent closed contour line, the greater summit is the parent, or encirclement parent, of the other. Thus Olenos is the parent peak of Granitis. To find a parent of Olenos in the Peloponnesos, however, one must travel all the way to Mount Kyllini in Korinthia, 49.6 km (30.8 mi) to the east, which has an elevation of 2,374 m (7,789 ft). The key col is 20.5 km (12.7 mi) ESE.

There is a 3rd peak, which is not the highest of the range, nor is it traditionally Erymanthos, and yet it has inherited the name, Erymanthos, perhaps because it hangs over and is an essential part of the Erymanthos River watershed. Location is 37.982599°N 21.848584°E, elevation 2,146 m (7,041 ft), prominence 315 m (1,033 ft). This Mount Erymanthos is visible from below at 37.948106°N 21.854954°E on the left side of the road in the village of Platanitsa, Achaea. The ridge of Olenos is visible above Erymanthos to the right, and the upper Erymanthos river, here a trickle in an otherwise dry Canyon, can be seen on the right. The village has a lot of plane trees but is on the edge of the tree line.

Olenos is the fourth-tallest peak in the Peloponnese peninsula. The summit is on the boundary of Achaea and Elis. Historically, Mount Erymanthos was part of northwestern Arcadia, where it was the second-tallest mountain range. The northern portion belonged to the historic Achaea.

The name, Erymanthos, is a legacy from prehistoric times; that is, the Bronze Age, and possibly before. It does appear as an implied region in Linear B, the script of the Late Bronze Age. Whether it is Indo-European or not is debatable and has not been resolved. It is not Greek. Olenos, on the other hand, is Greek for ulna, "forearm," although the reason for the name has been lost (some sort of bend has been suggested).

In contrast to most of the other mountain ranges of Eurasia, Erymanthos seems to have no discernible geometric pattern, which leads to certain difficulties in discerning which peaks are in it and which not. In the literature the borders are somewhat flexible; one source will state that a certain village or mountain is in, while another refers to it as out. More recently (1992 and after) the problem of definition was confronted by the Greek government in compliance to the European Union's Habitats Directive of 1992 requiring its member states to establish Protected areas in the Natura 2000 network.

== Status as a protected area ==
Erymanthos received its own protected area named oros Erymanthus and identified with the ID of GR2320008. Official interest began with the first compilation of its Natura 2000 Standard Data Form in 1995. It was proposed to the Ministry of the Environment and Energy (Greece) as a "Site of Community Importance (SCI)" in 1997, but was not confirmed as such until 2006. With the 2011 reorganization of community structure it was made a "Special Area of Conservation (SAC)." These designations are legally binding by Law 3437, March 29, 2011. GR2320008 was placed under the management of the Management Body of Ygrotopoi Kotychiou-Dasous Strofylias, which manages mainly coastal wetlands in Elis.

Meanwhile, this classification was becoming distressingly inadequate. The region has an area of about 19,332.14 ha (74.6418 mi^{2}), totally on land (neglecting streams). The perimeter is about 80.9 km (50.3 mi). A representative north–south distance is 15.42 km (9.58 mi). A representative east–west distance is 26.67 km (16.57 mi). The periphery is dotted with small villages placed at the ends of access roads slightly up on the base of the mountainous terrain. The protected region is generally free of roads and villages, except for two, Platanista and Lechourion. The terrain is mild compared to the precipitous heights of the Alps. Rock- and cliff-climbing is not necessary if not desired, yet the region is cut by ravines everywhere, making the trails rough going.

The problem is that GR2320008 is located predominantly in nomos Achaïas, with only a small portion extending into Elis, and yet about half the mountainous terrain is in Elis. The border divides Mount Erymanthos into a north half and a south half The whole south drainage was omitted from protection. The answer of course was to expand the protected area to cover the whole mountain in both Achaea and Elis, but once legal entities have been created, they cannot be easily changed. A new area was required.

The new area was proposed in a Natura 2000 Standard Data Form in 2009. It was coded GR2320012, and has the same name, Oros Erymanthus. This area included GR2320008, but reached into Elis to embrace the rest of the massif, approximately doubling the protected region. GR2320012 has an area of about 39,020.94 ha (150.6607 mi^{2}), also on land. The perimeter is about 120.6 km (74.9 mi). A representative NE-SW distance is 28 km (17 mi). A representative NW-SE distance is 16 km (9.9 mi); that is to say, the mountainous terrain is approximately ovoid with the long axis NW-SW. The protected area is extended to the SW in GR2320002, Oropedio Folois, "Plain of Foloi," comprising Foloi Forest, protected for its birds. It is not part of the mountain.

GR2320008 as a legal entity did not vanish away, which it could not do without a change in law. When GR2320012 became a "Special Protection Area (SPA)" in 2010 (for its birds, same as Foloi Forest), it incorporated GR2320008, which now had a double status, a SAC as 0008, and an SPA as 0012. The mountain thus remained politically divided into its northern and western slopes, primarily in Achaea, and its southern slopes, primarily in Elis. Some sources erroneously refer to the southern slopes alone as GR2320012. The stage was thus set for the popular distinction "Erymanthos in Achaea" versus "Erymanthos in Elis." The government, however, manages them both under the same agency in the same way, as Federal distinctions supersede regional and municipal.

== Management of Oros Enymanthos ==
In 2011 the Prefecture of Elis vanished away in favor of the Region of Elis (same territory) comprising seven new municipalities. The southern area of 012 fell to the new municipality of Ancient Olympia. The legal complexity was not necessarily matched by administrative chaos. Both 008 and 012 came to be moved to a different management unit with a jurisdiction more suitable to the mountains of north Peloponnesus, which is in Western Greece: the Management Body of Chelmos-Vomaikos, which had an office in downtown Kalavrita, Achaea. The location makes no legal difference. The protected areas are under Federal jurisdiction, not municipal, although the officials of the latter can always advise. That 008 is mainly in Achaea, or that 012 is often attributed to Achaea, though as much is in Elis, is irrelevant to the management of the park. The "Feds" can work with supporting services of either with equal facility, nor does the difference in classification between 008 and 012 make any difference, as the whole area is managed by the same body according to the same rules. Transgressors cannot "escape" over any borders, unless those are national ones, and if the transgression is serious enough, perhaps not then.

== Topography of Erymanthus massif ==
Below is a summary of the peaks in the Natura 2000 protected area. The altitudes and locations are mainly from the GR2320008 dataset, which is given precedence. These may vary slightly from source to source. PeakVisor is used as a back-up source, and also gives the prominences. The etymologies are mainly of Greek names. Other possible ethnic sources of names are Turkish and Slavic, once minority populations of the region. The translation of a Greek name is often a matter of opinion; if there is any disagreement, refer to any Greek dictionary, or to the large English dictionaries, such as Merriam-Webster International, or American Heritage.

Peaks of the Mount Erymanthus protected area
Name	Altitude/ Prominence	Location	Etymology
Kallifoni; Καλλιφώνι	1,997 m (6,552 ft); 513 m (1,683 ft)	37.97869°N 21.93150°E	"famous" Mythical sense, probably the boar
Lepidas; Λεπίδας	1,882 m (6,175 ft); 189 m (620 ft)	37.97138°N 21.86583°E	"knife-edge" Either from the glisten or the shape, parallel "razor-back." Common also for ravines and waterfalls.
Macheras; Μαχαιράς	1,879 m (6,165 ft); 341 m (1,119 ft)	37.94811°N 21.88064°E	"knife" Probably from the ridge-shape of the peak.
Melissovouni; Μελισσοβούνι	1,464 m (4,803 ft); 35 m (115 ft)	38.02765°N 21.81811°E	"honey-hill" Possibly from the bee-hives there.
Mikre Mouggila; Μικρἡ Μουγγίλα	1,900 m (6,200 ft)	37.99293°N 21.86558°E	"Mougila" or "Moughila Minor," which omits the nasal (Moungila)
Mouggila; Μουγγίλα; Greek gg is a nasal	2,169 m (7,116 ft)	37.98158°N 21.84884°E	"muzzle" sense unknown
Olenos; Ωλενός or Granites	2,223 m (7,293 ft); 1,205 m (3,953 ft)	37.98778°N 21.83433°E	"bump" Some feature of the forearm, possibly the elbow
Profetes Elias; Προφήτης Ἠλίας	2,125 m (6,972 ft); 308 m (1,010 ft)	37.95291°N 21.0258°E	"Prophet Elijah,"; Perhaps because out in the wilderness, a common name of remote monasteries and terrain features.
Psele Tourla; Ψηλἡ Τοὑρλα	2,086 m (6,844 ft); 255 m (837 ft)	37.96823°N 21.84330°E	"Swelling," this is "Grand Tourla." Tourla is used with different adjective for different peaks.
Skouteli; Σκουτέλι	1,757 m (5,764 ft); 155 m (509 ft)	37.95630°N 21.90532°E	"Bowl," a type used for serving

== Hydrology of the Erymanthos massif ==
The Erymanthos massif has two main watersheds, one to the north, which drains water exuding from the northward-facing cols into the Gulfs of Patras and Corinth, and water from the southward-facing cols into the Alfeios river basin, where water that is not utilized by man empties into the Gulf of Kyparissia. There is a smaller drainage to the west directly into the Gulf of Kyparissia. Drainage to the east is pre-empted by the higher mountains of Arcadia, which also drain to the west into the Alfeios.

=== Erymanthos river ===
Overall the Erymanthos River flows directly south from the col between Psele Tourla and Lepidas a distance of about 51.8 km (32.2 mi) to intersect the Alfeios as a right-bank tributary. The lower half of the river is well-channeled through the Erymanthos ravine. From here is channeled the municipal water supply of Elis.

The upper half is highly dendritic merging dozens if not hundreds of temporary streams in converging ravines. There is little point in trying to single out any of them as "the source," as most do not even have names nor are they accurately marked on the map. There was obviously no point in plotting a detailed map of the area. The dendrism begins above Nemouta. Some few sources give different names for some of the streams, but more misleading yet, they tend to devise names, fudge in streams, and extend other known rivers into the area.

The civil engineers don't involve themselves in naming contentions. They define the Erymanthos and all possible dendrism as the Erymanthos sub-basin of the Alfeios Basin. To it is assigned the function of providing municipal water to the communities downstream. The area of the sub-basin is calculated by them at 361.42 km^{2} (139.55 sq mi). On it falls 1200mm of precipitation, resulting in a winter discharge of 10 cubic meters per second. The slope is fairly steep, 35.3%, the average altitude 861 m (2,825 ft). The river has great recreational value, including white-water rafting, but there is a growing danger of pollution from farm run-off and unprocessed waste water.

== Geography ==
=== Places located on or near the mountain ===
West	Drosia	Kalentzi	Alpochori	Stavrodromi
North	Chalandritsa	Kalousi	Chrysopigi	Lakkomata
Northeast	Kato Vlasia	Ano Vlasia	Kertezi	
East	Livartzi	Lechouri		
Southeast	Paos	Aroania		
South	Lampeia	Oreini	Psofida	
Southwest	Skiada	Agia Triada	Antroni	

=== Region ===
Mount Skollis is to the west, and many smaller mountains are to the north. Stretching east and southeast is Chelmos, also known as Aroania, which is the name of both a mountain and a village. Chelmos, which can be seen from the mountain, is located to the east, but stretches to the south. The villages of south area of Panachaiko and Omplos are located in an agriculturally rich valley between the peaks of Erymanthos.

=== Description ===
The elevation ranges from 150 metres (490 ft) in the north to up to 800 metres (2,600 ft)-1,000 metres (3,300 ft) in the south. Erymanthos is forested around its edges, the forest cover consisting of pine, olive, cedar, birch, and spruce trees. Barren land and grasslands vary from 1,000 metres (3,300 ft) to 1,600 metres (5,200 ft) and non-vegetated portions continue up to the summit. The mountain's color is derived from the colors of the bedrock, which are brown, butterscotch, and tan. Several dry streams appear on the peak.

Connected mountain ranges include Kallifoni and Lampeia (Divri) to the southwest. Other peaks include Moungila or Mougila (Μουγγίλα) at 2,169 metres (7,116 ft), Profitis Ilias (Προφήτης Ηλίας) at 2,124 metres (6,969 ft), Pyrgakos or Pirgakos (Πυργάκος) at 2,050 metres (6,730 ft), one at 1,923 metres (6,309 ft), I Psili Tourla at 1,891 metres (6,204 ft), Lepida (Λεπίδα) at 1,541 metres (5,056 ft), Melissovouni (Μελισσοβούνι meaning "the mountain of bees") at 1,461 metres (4,793 ft), and Agios Athanasios (Άγιος Αθανάσιος) at 1,219 metres (3,999 ft). The mountain is the source of the Pineios river to the southwest, Selinountas to the east, Erymanthos to the south, and Peiros and Parapeiros to the southeast. It is part of the Oleni-Pindos geological zone.

=== Panorama ===
The view from the summit of Erymanthos includes most of the western and northwestern Peloponnese, northern Arcadia, and the hills of eastern Ilia. The mountains of southern Central Greece and the mountains of the islands of Zakynthos, Kefalonia, and Ithaca can be seen on clear days.

== Gallery ==
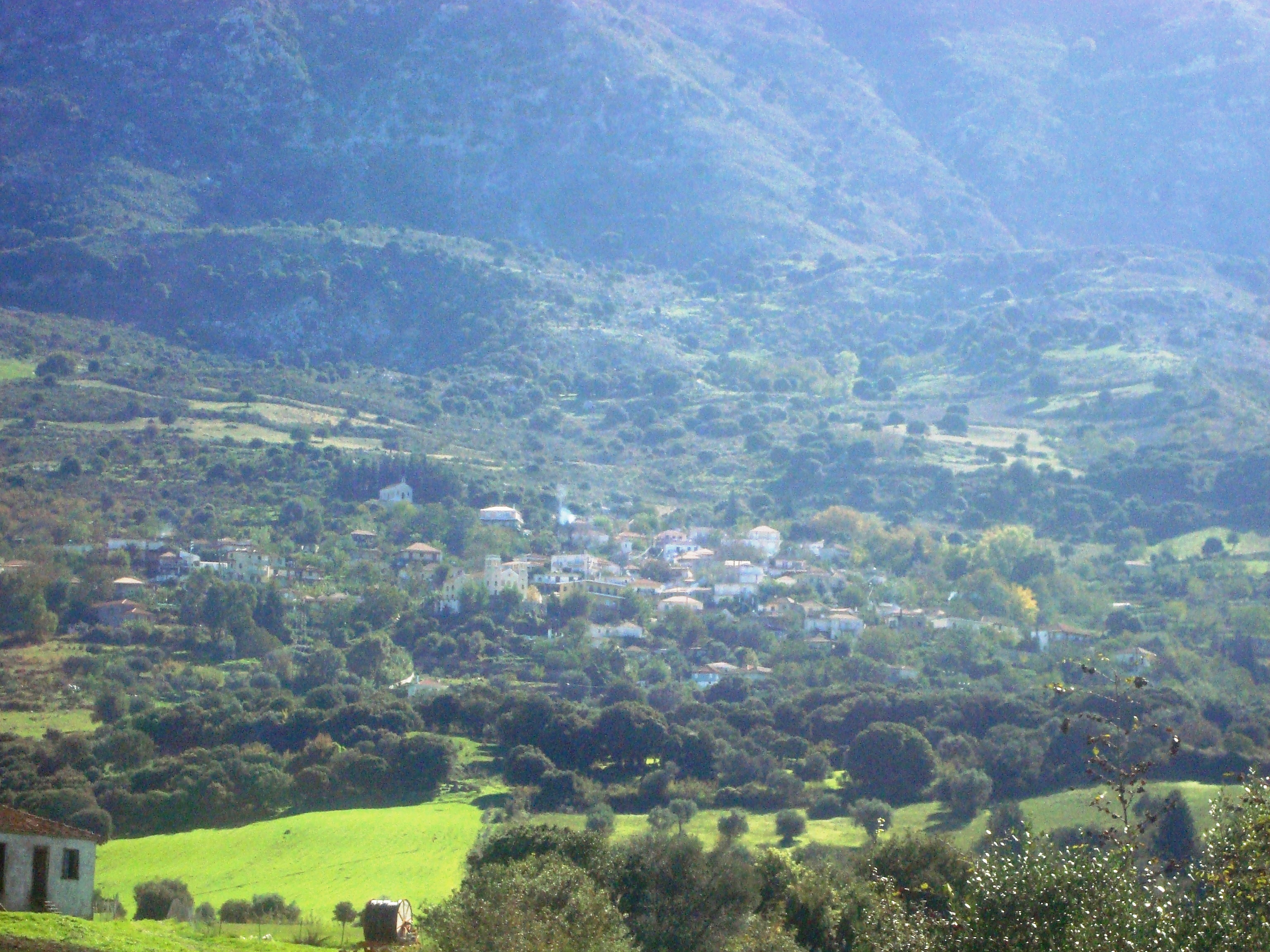
The village of Skiada on the side of Mount Erymanthos

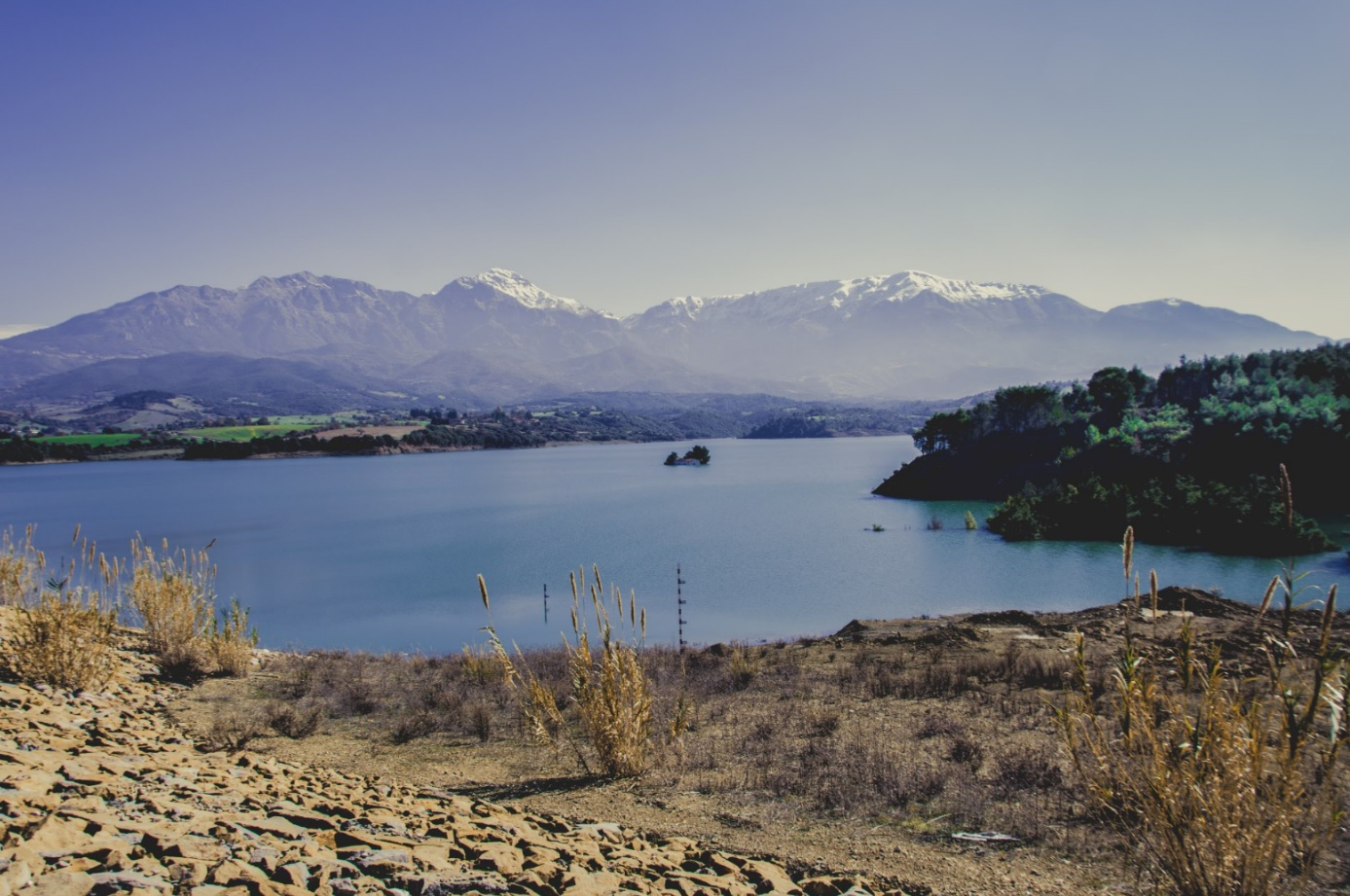
Asteri Dam or Parapiros Dam. View of the dam lake. The temporary islet with Saint Theodores' chapel of Mitopolis village is sinking. The numerous peaks of Mt. Erymanthos can be seen in the background.

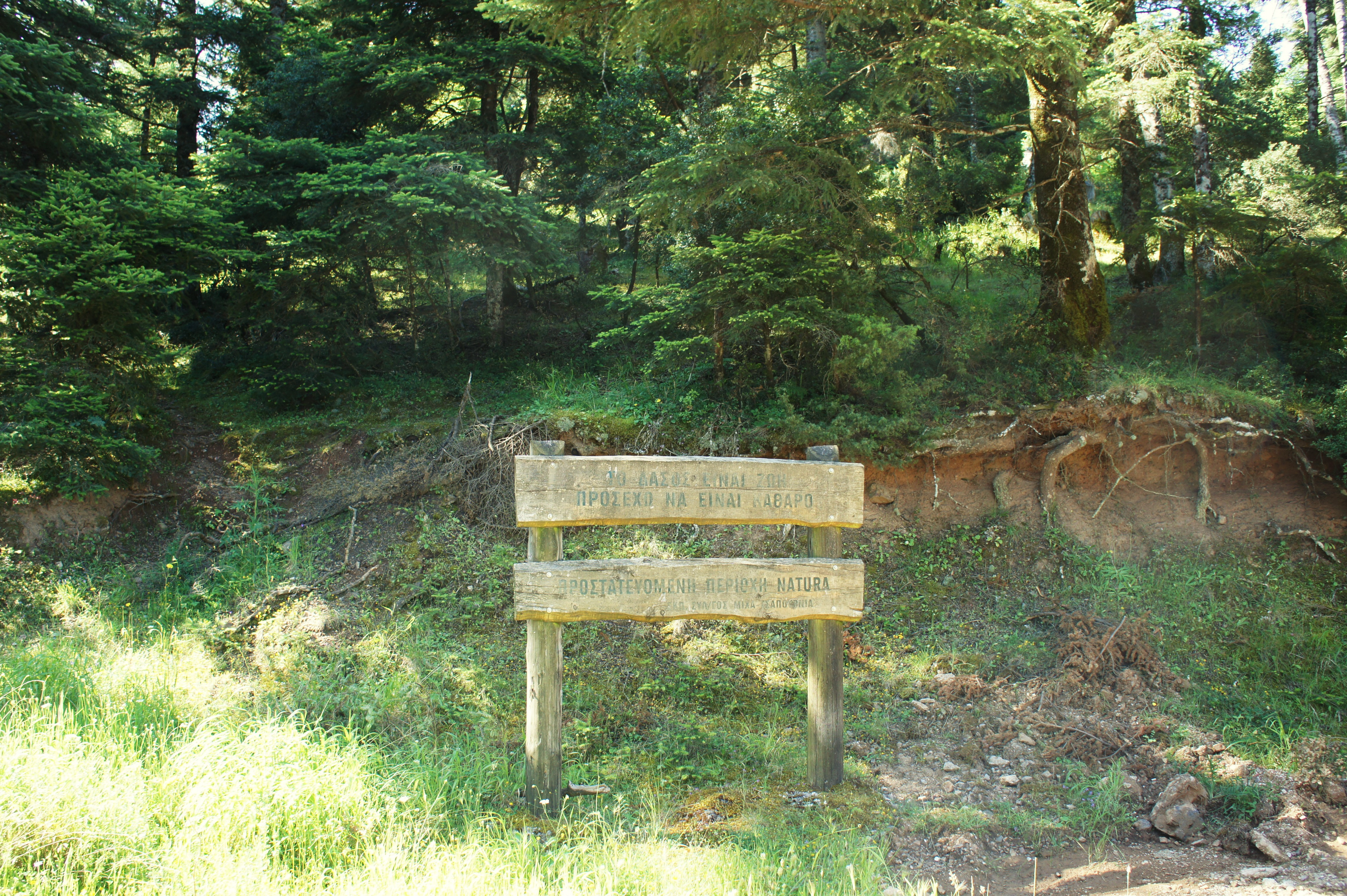
Natura 2000 sign in Erymanthos.

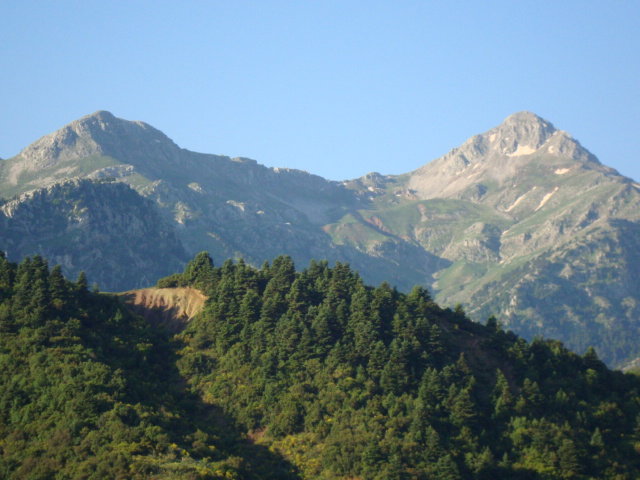
Olonos (on the right), as well as the second highest peak of Erymanthos, Mougila (on the left). View is from the north, showing the col between them.

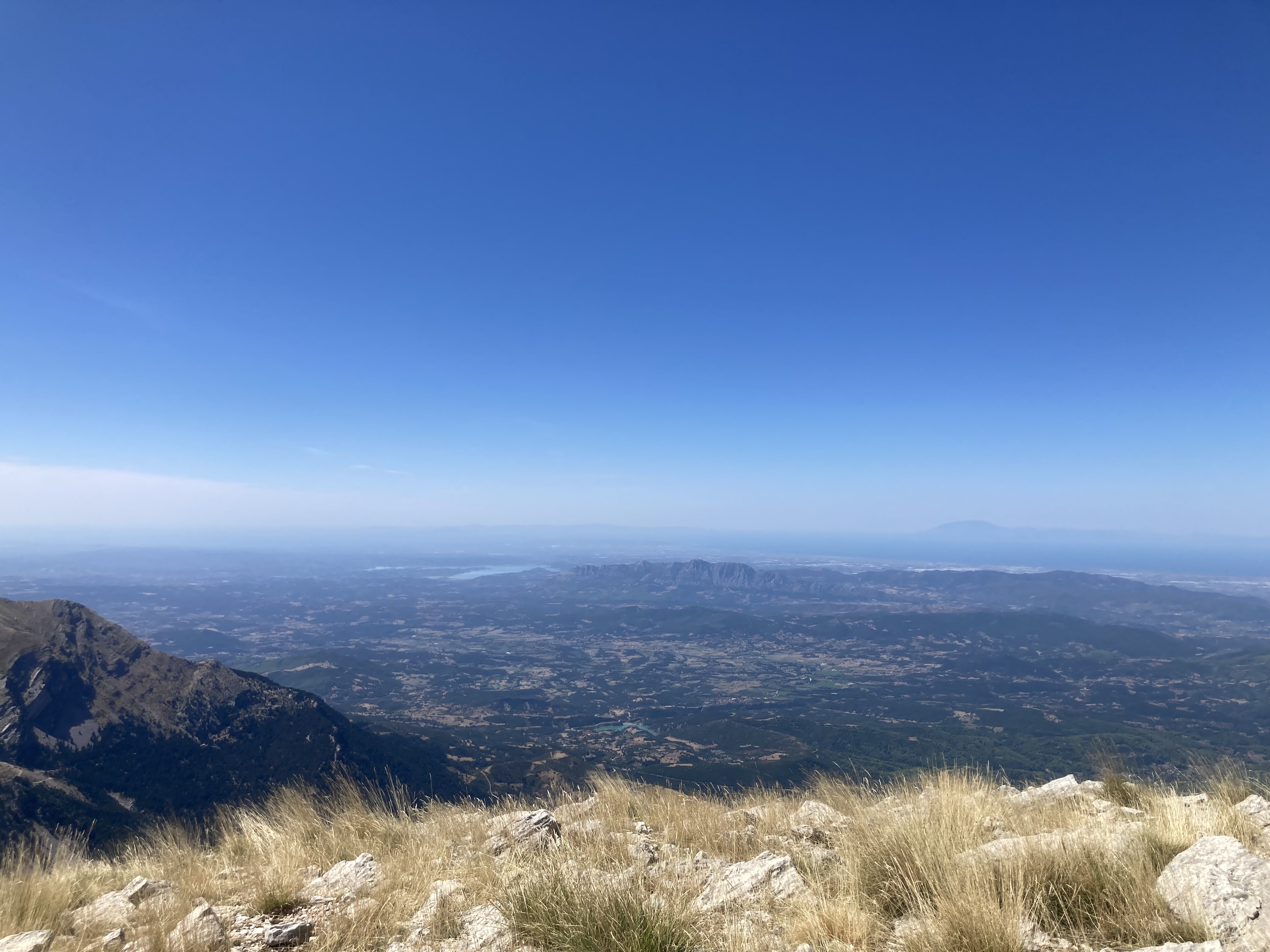
View looking north-west from Olenos Peak of Mount Erymanthos. Visible on the horizon are the islands of Zakynthos (left) and Kephalonia (right). Distance from Olenos peak to the Kephalonia's Ainos peak is about 64 miles.

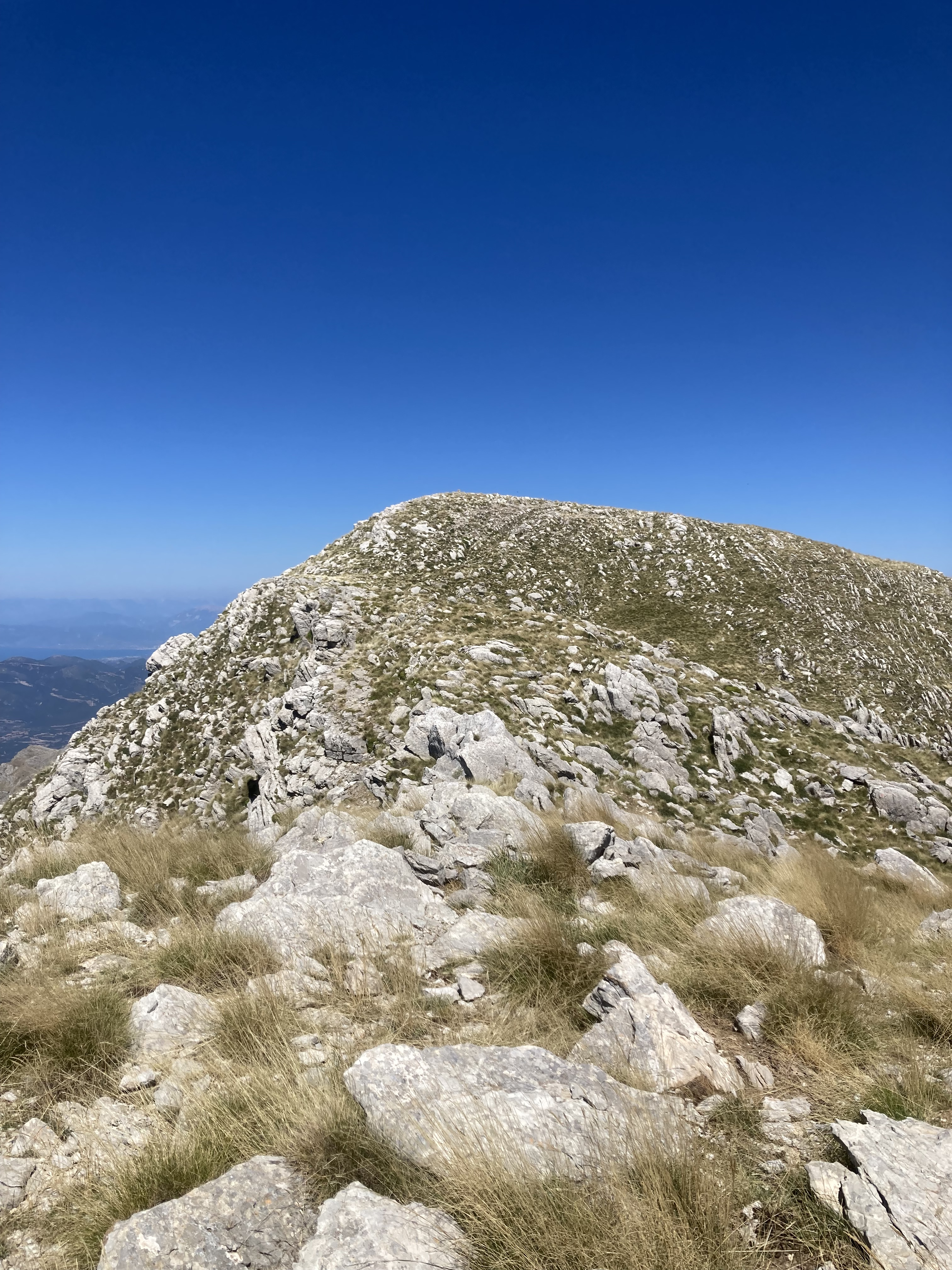
View of Olenos Peak from just below the summit.

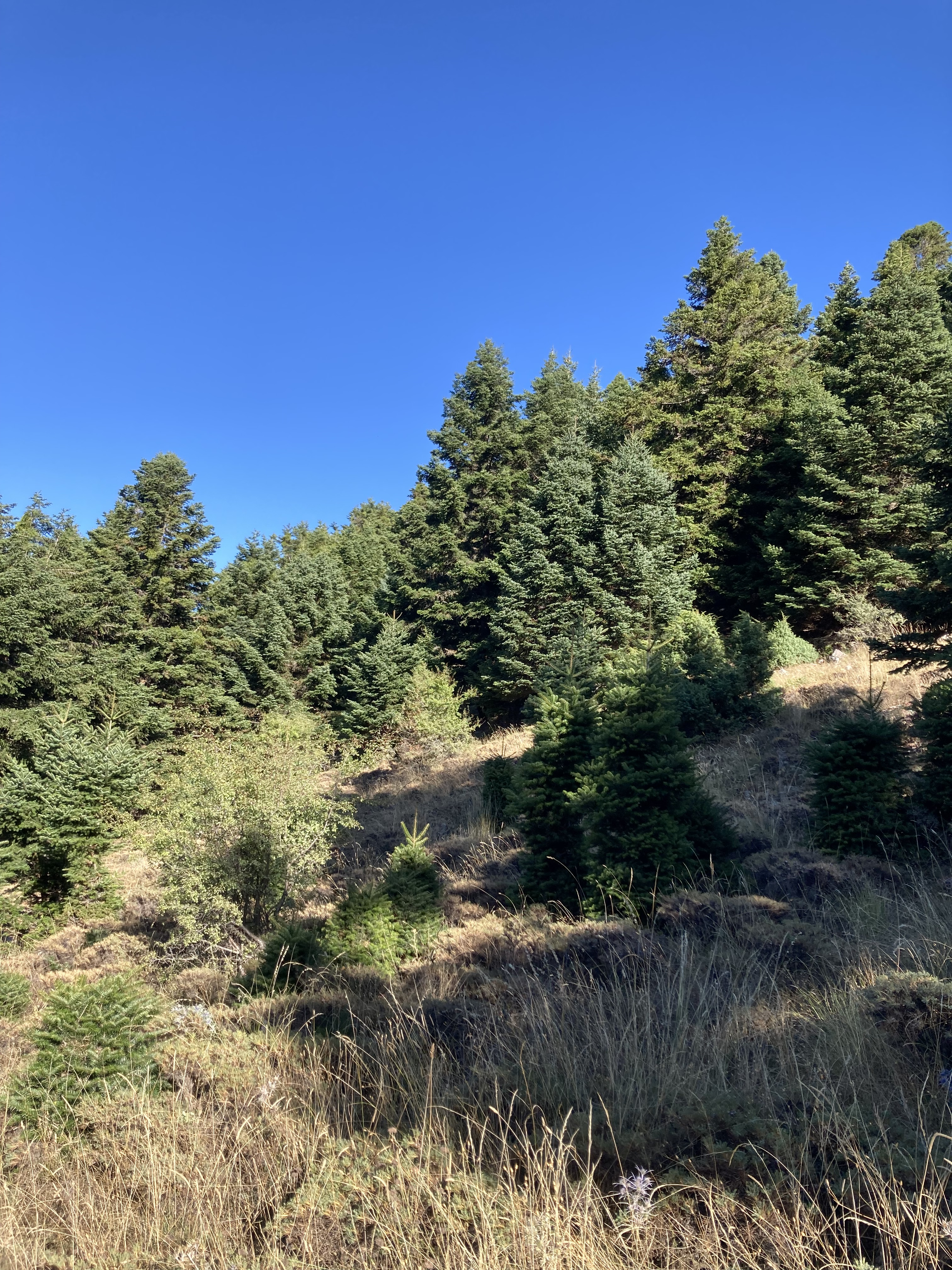
Greek Fir (Abies cephalonica) on the lower slopes of Erymanthos.

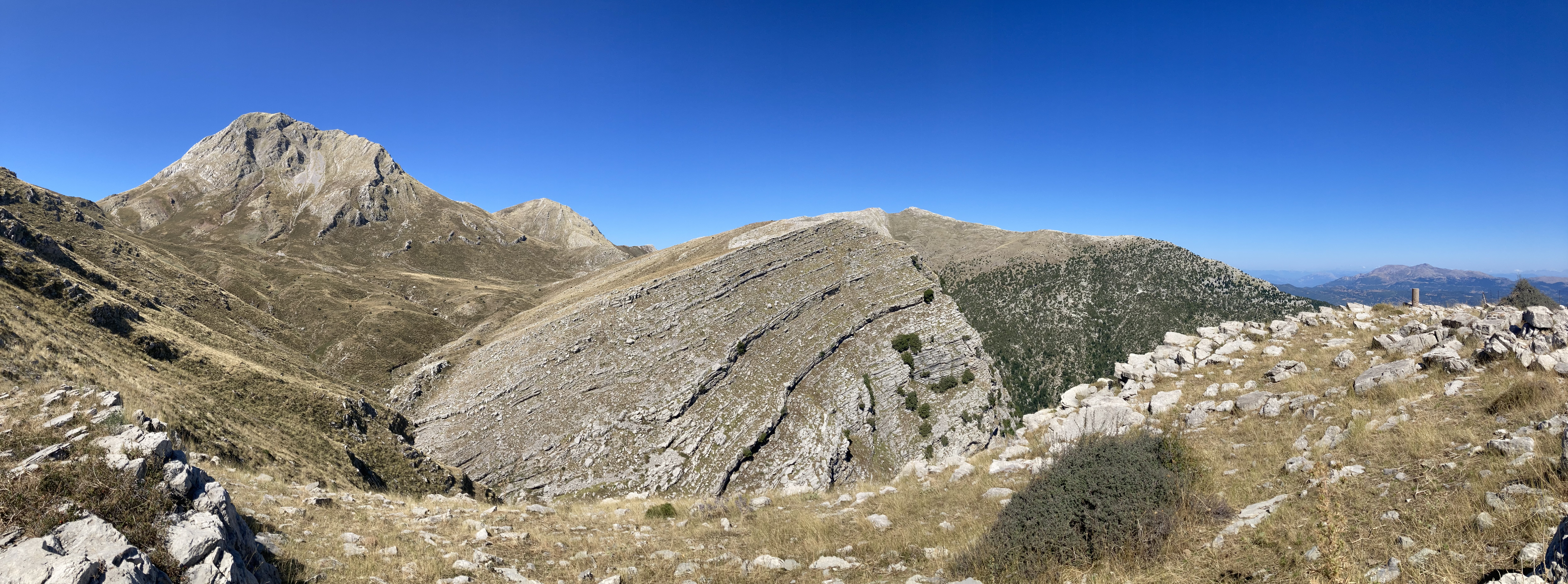
View of Olenos Peak on the climb upwards showing the Alpine ecosystem.

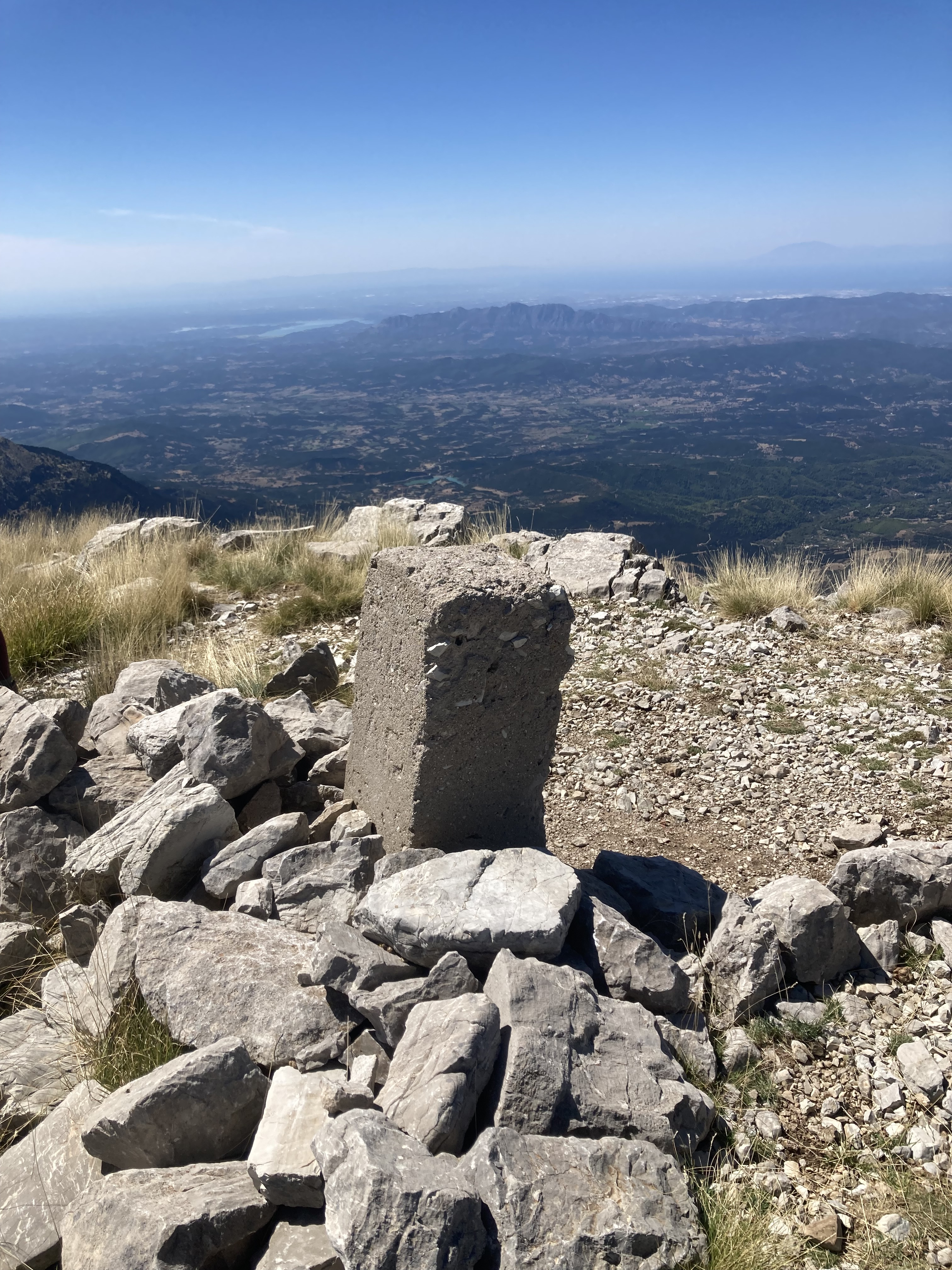
The summit marker at the top of Olenos Peak.

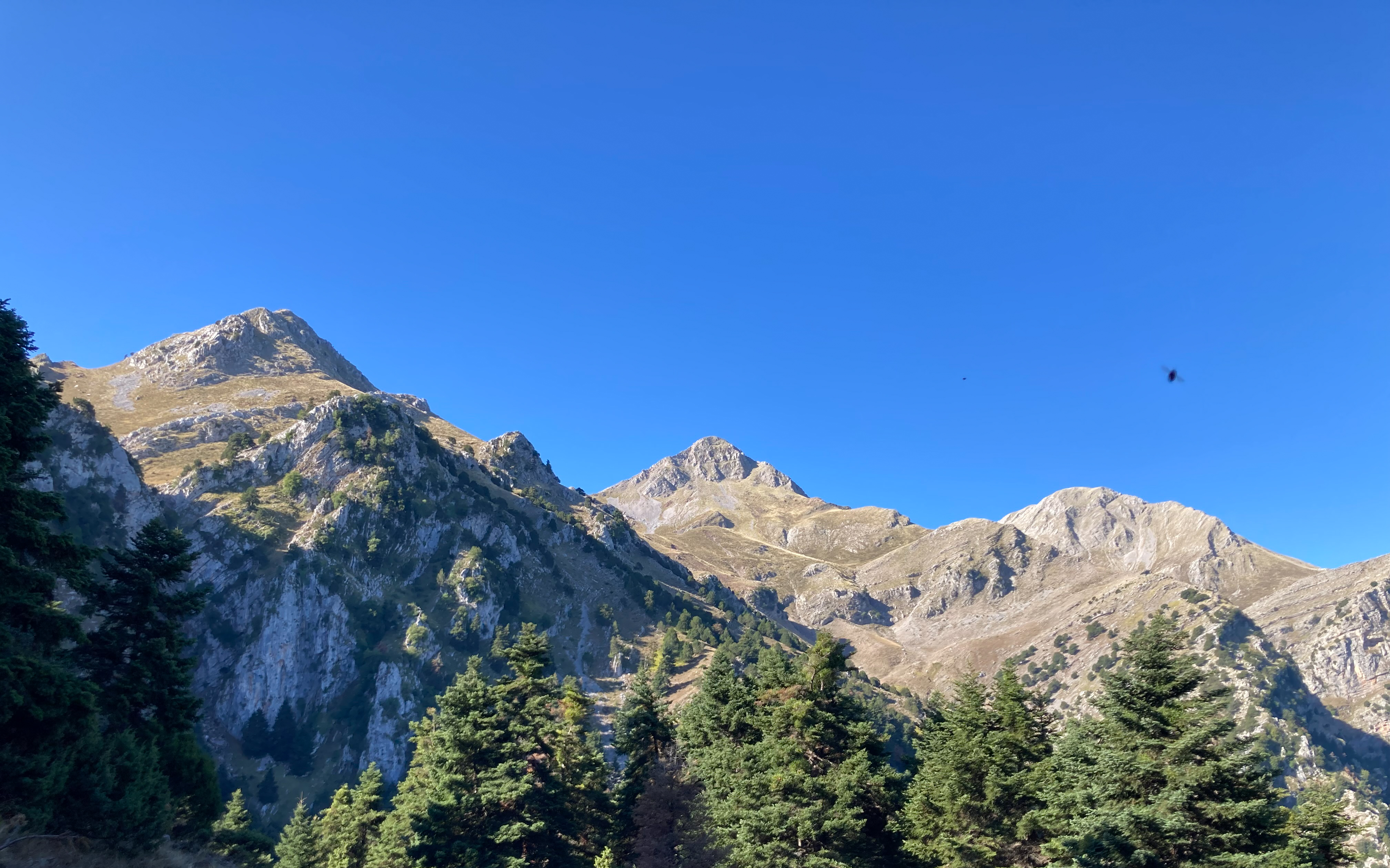
The three peaks of Erymanthos from left to right: Mikre Mouggila, Mouggila and Olenos.

== Mythology ==
Erymanthos appears once in the supposed works of Homer, the legendary author traditionally credited with the two epic poems, Iliad and Odyssey, as well as some others. The Odyssey dates to the 7th or 8th century BC. The works of Homer are believed to be the oldest surviving literature in Europe, not counting Linear B as literature. There is scant mention of Erymanthos in these poems, only that Artemis "goes among the mountains (ourea), ridged Taygetus or Erymanthus, delighting in the boars (kaproi) and the swift deer (elaphoi) with the Nymphs." One legitimate instance is enough to prove the existence of a ridged mountain, Erymanthus. Artemis and the Nymphs are mythical, but the boars and deer appear ordinary.

The stage is set for the myths of the Erymanthian boar, one of the Labours of Hercules, and of the centaur, Folus. These are collaborative myths, or running stories on a theme, written by generations of classical authors in ancient Greek times, and continued by the Roman authors. It cannot be said that they ever ceased, as, like the Iliad and Odyssey, the myths are current today with modern innovations. The footnotes on Homer far exceed the lengths of the original works. Similarly, the continuations of the Hercules myths would fill modern libraries. The cut-off point for genuine reflections of the ancient myth is about the year 1000. Any author before then might have access to previously lost information, and is considered fair game for hunting old stories of Hercules.

Archaeologically, the poetic time of these myths of heroes and cities is termed the Bronze Age, when the chief hard material, especially of arms and armor, was bronze. In the Aegean, this predominance ended at the beginning of a period of social disorder called the Greek Dark Ages. A cause, or symptom, depending on the historical model, was the southward migration of people armed with iron weapons. A conventional date for this victory of disrupting, better-armed northerners is about 1000 BC, but of course the period began before and ended after. Subsequently, the civilization of the Mediterranean was called the Iron Age, which preferred iron to bronze. The classical civilizations belonged to it. All the mythographers of stories about the Bronze Age were Iron Age.

The latest phase of the Bronze Age proper is the Late Bronze Age (1750-1050 BC), also called the Mycenaean Age (There was an "improper" Bronze Age, the Submycenaean, representing an extension of unsuccessful Mycenaeans into the disorder.) Politically it was characterized by the dominance of Argolis, one of the regions of Ancient Greece, especially of one citadel in it, Mycenae, the home of high king Agamemnon, who led the Achaeans against Troy in the Trojan War. His brother, Menelaus, ruled Lacedaemon, and his trusted advisor, Nestor, ruled Pylos. Palaces have been found at these places (and more), while the Linear B script, found extensively at Pylos, demonstrates that Mycenaean Greek was spoken there, and in the south of Greece, including Crete and the islands.

== History ==
Between the Byzantine Empire and the Greek War of Independence, several villages were founded, including Skiada and Oreino. In 1884, the new Agios Ioannis o Prodromos Church, Spodiana was built on the northern part of the mountain in the village of Chrysopigi, next to an old church whose date of construction is unknown. After World War II and the Greek Civil War, most villages were rebuilt. On February 5, 2008, the mountain was shaken by two earthquakes measuring 5.5 on the Richter scale. One epicenter was in Chalandritsa, and the other was in Farres, outside the range.

== See also ==
- List of mountains in Greece
