= Peiros =

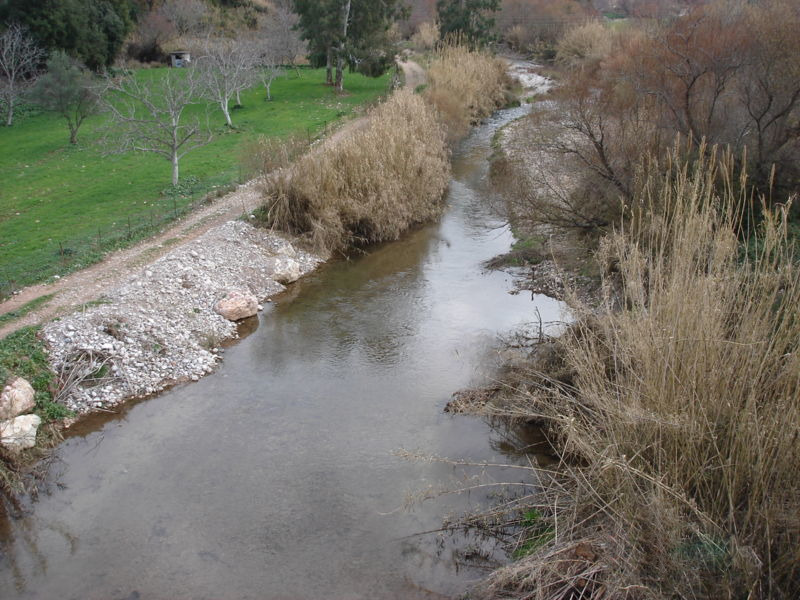
- Native name: Πείρος (Greek)

Location
- Country: Greece

Physical characteristics
- Source
  - location: Achaea
- Mouth
  - location: Gulf of Patras
  - coordinates: 38°9′4″N 21°34′25″E
- Length: 42.6 km (26.5 mi)
- Basin size: 578 km^{2} (223 sq mi)

Basin features
- Tributaries
  - left: Parapeiros, Serdini

The Peiros (Greek: Πείρος, formerly also Kamenitza and Achelous) is a river in the central and the northwestern parts of Achaea, Greece. It is 42.6 km (26.5 mi) long.

== Geography ==
The Peiros is the second longest river in Achaea, after Selinountas. It rises in the northeastern part of the Erymanthos mountains, near the village Lakkomata. It passes through the municipal units of Farres, Olenia and Dymi. It empties into the Gulf of Patras between the towns Alissos and Kato Achaia. There are several bridges over the Peiros, including the bridges of the Greek National Road 9/E55 (Patras - Pyrgos - Kyparissia) and OSE's Patras–Kyparissia railway line. Two ancient cities were situated near the river: Olenos and Pharae.

Its most important tributaries are the Parapeiros (also known as Tytheus) and the Serdini.
