= Chalandritsa =

Community of Erymanthos, Achaea, Greece

Chalandritsa Χαλανδρίτσα
- Community
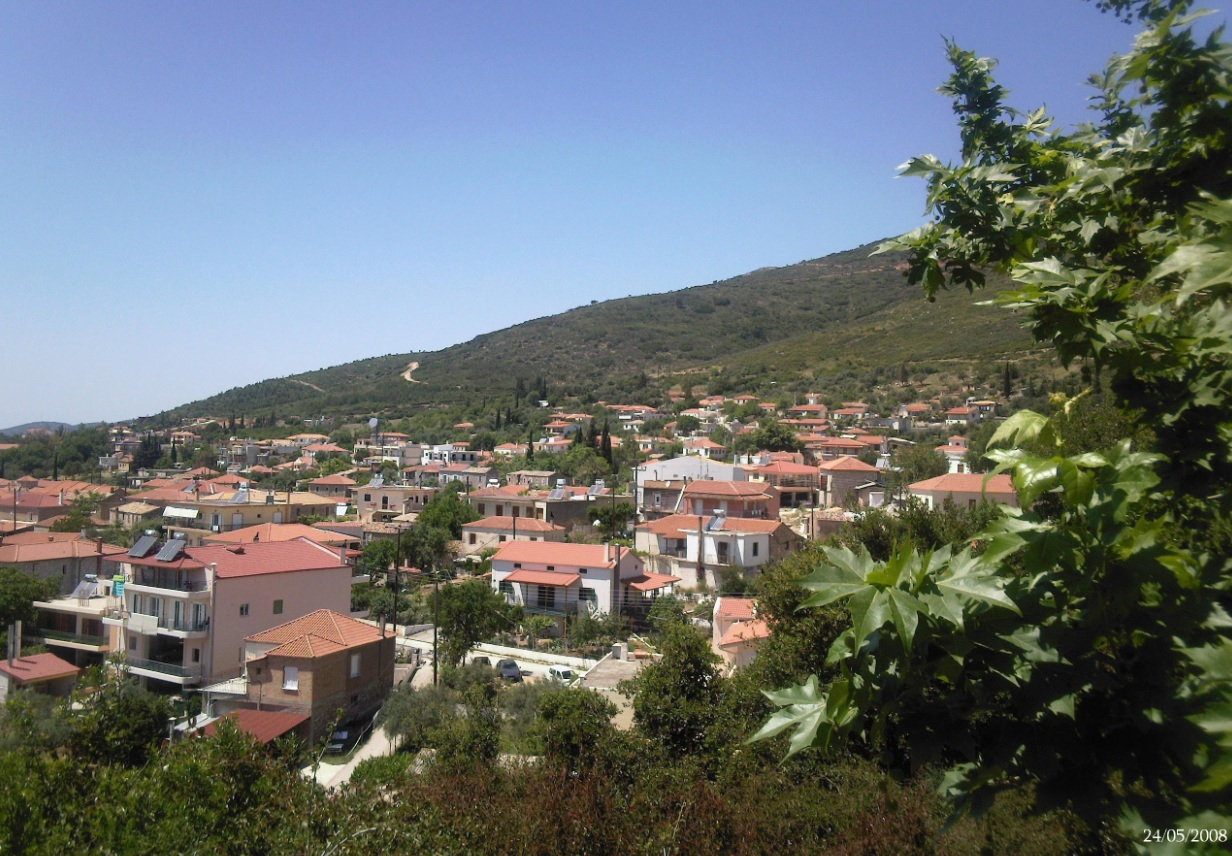
- Chalandritsa

- Location within Greece
- Coordinates: 38°7′N 21°48′E
- Country: Greece
- Administrative region: West Greece
- Regional unit: Achaea
- Municipality: Erymanthos
- Municipal unit: Farres
- Elevation: 334 m (1,096 ft)

Population (2021)
  - Community: 929
- Time zone: UTC+2 (EET)
  - Summer (DST): UTC+3 (EEST)
- Postal code: 25008
- Vehicle registration: AX
- Website: www.farron.gov.gr

Chalandritsa (Greek: Χαλανδρίτσα) is a town and a community in Achaea, West Greece, Greece. Since 2011 local government reform it is part of the municipality Erymanthos, of which it is the seat of administration. Chalandritsa is situated in hills north of the river Peiros, 17 km south of Patras. The community consists of the settlements Chalandritsa, Mastoraiika-Stamaiika and Kydonies. From 1835 until 1912, and again from 1998 until 2011 it was a municipal district and the seat of the municipality of Farres. Chalandritsa is at the edge of a seismic fault, which caused a minor earthquake in February 2008.

== History ==
According to Pouqueville the name "Chalandritsa" stems from "Χαλασμένη Τριταία" ("broken Tritaia"), referring to bad climate. Triantafyllou suggests that it comes either from the nearby town Chalampreza that was abandoned in the early 19th century, or from the Byzantine word Chalandra. Other names for the town are: Kalampreza, Chalantritza and Chalaoyritza. The historian Stefanos Thomopoulos wrote that it was named thus because during Byzantine rule the notorious bandit Andritsos was killed here ("Χάλασμα του Ανδρίτσου" = "breaking of Andritsos").

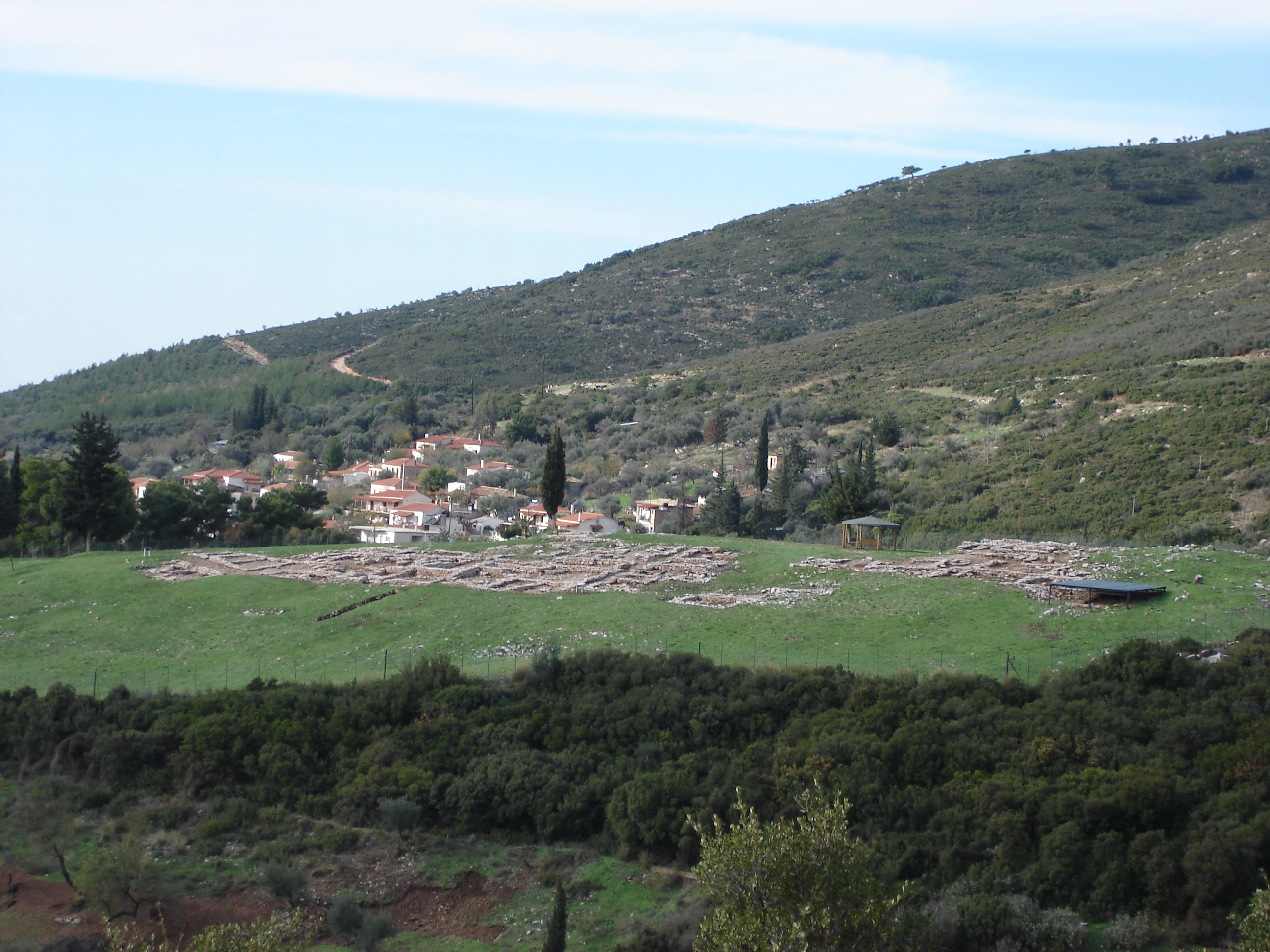
Mycenaean settlement near Chalandritsa

Chalandritsa has been populated since the Paleolithic era. During excavations for the construction of a health centre, remains of a prehistoric settlement were found near the locality of Stavros. The houses were located around the edge of the hill and it is assumed that there was a public building or temple at the center. A Mycenaean cemetery has been found nearby. The name of the settlement is unknown. Pottery and stone tools dating to the 11th century BC have been found.

During the Frankish rule (13th-14th century) Chalandritsa was initially part of the Barony of Patras, from which it was separated as the Barony of Chalandritsa. The barony was ruled by the French Dramelay (or Trémolay) family and later the Genoese Zaccaria family. The French name, as preserved in the Chronicle of Morea, was Calandrice. Chalandritsa was the last barony remaining in Frankish hands, and its fall to the Despotate of the Morea in 1429 also signalled the end of the Principality of Achaea. After that, it followed the fate of the rest of Achaea. During the Greek War of Independence, on 26 February 1822, the town was ransacked and burned by 2,000 Turks. In July 1943, during World War II, the occupying Italian army fired on Chalandritsa in retaliation for a partisan attack. During the Greek Civil War, in 1948, Chalandritsa was the scene of fierce fighting between government and rebel forces.

== Sights ==
- The Folk Art and Local Ηistory Museum.
- The Mycenaean settlement and the Mycenaean cemetery
- The Frankish tower
- The Byzantine churches of St. Athanasius and the Dormition of the Virgin
- Watermills and springs
- Traditional center of village

== Sport ==
The local amateur football club is the Doxa Chalandritsa.

== Notable citizens ==
- Kostas Katsouranis
- Eleni Labiri
