= Erymanthos (municipality) =

Municipality in the regional unit of Achaea, Peloponnese, Greece

Erymanthos Ερύμανθος
- Municipality
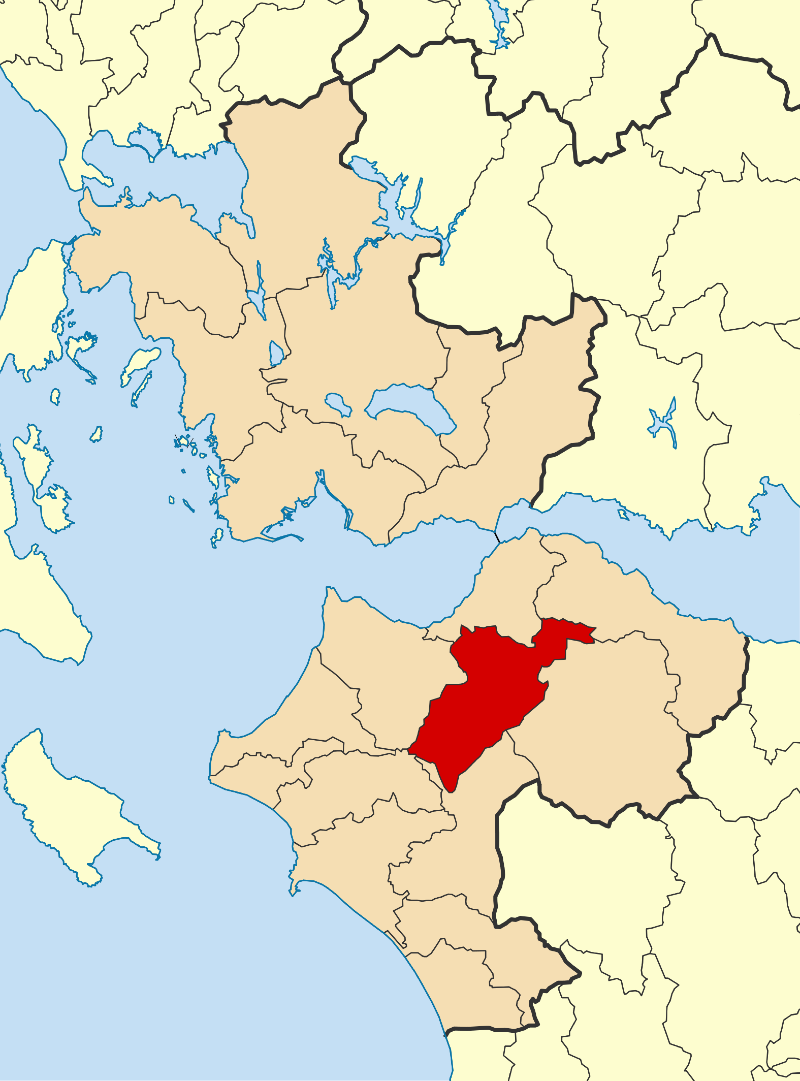

- Location within Greece
- Coordinates: 38°6′N 21°47′E
- Country: Greece
- Geographic region: Peloponnese
- Administrative region: Western Greece
- Regional unit: Achaea
- Seat: Chalandritsa

Area
  - Municipality: 582.1 km^{2} (224.8 sq mi)

Population (2021)
  - Municipality: 8,211
  - Density: 14.11/km^{2} (36.53/sq mi)
- Time zone: UTC+2 (EET)
  - Summer (DST): UTC+3 (EEST)
- Website: erymanthos.gov.gr

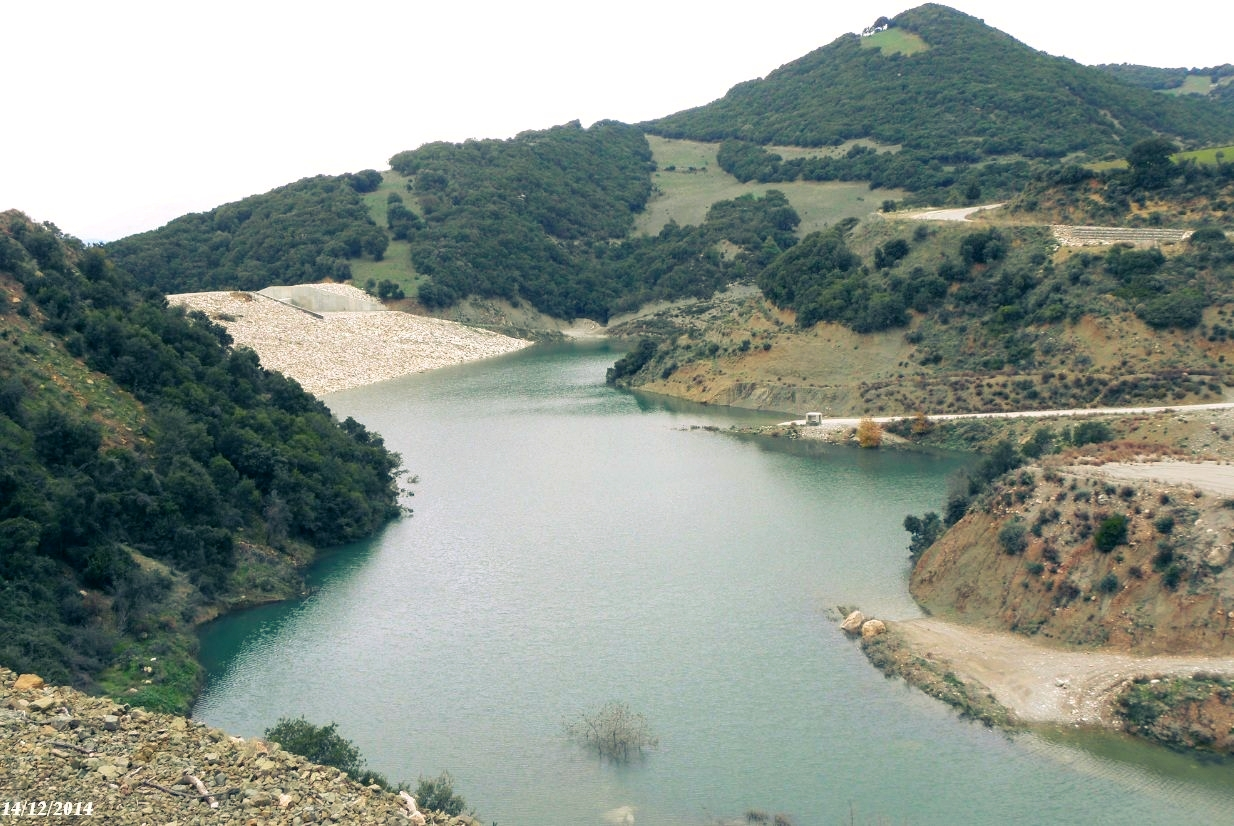
View of Ntaska Reservoir close to Erymantheia and Velimachi villages, Tritaia region, Achaia, Greece.

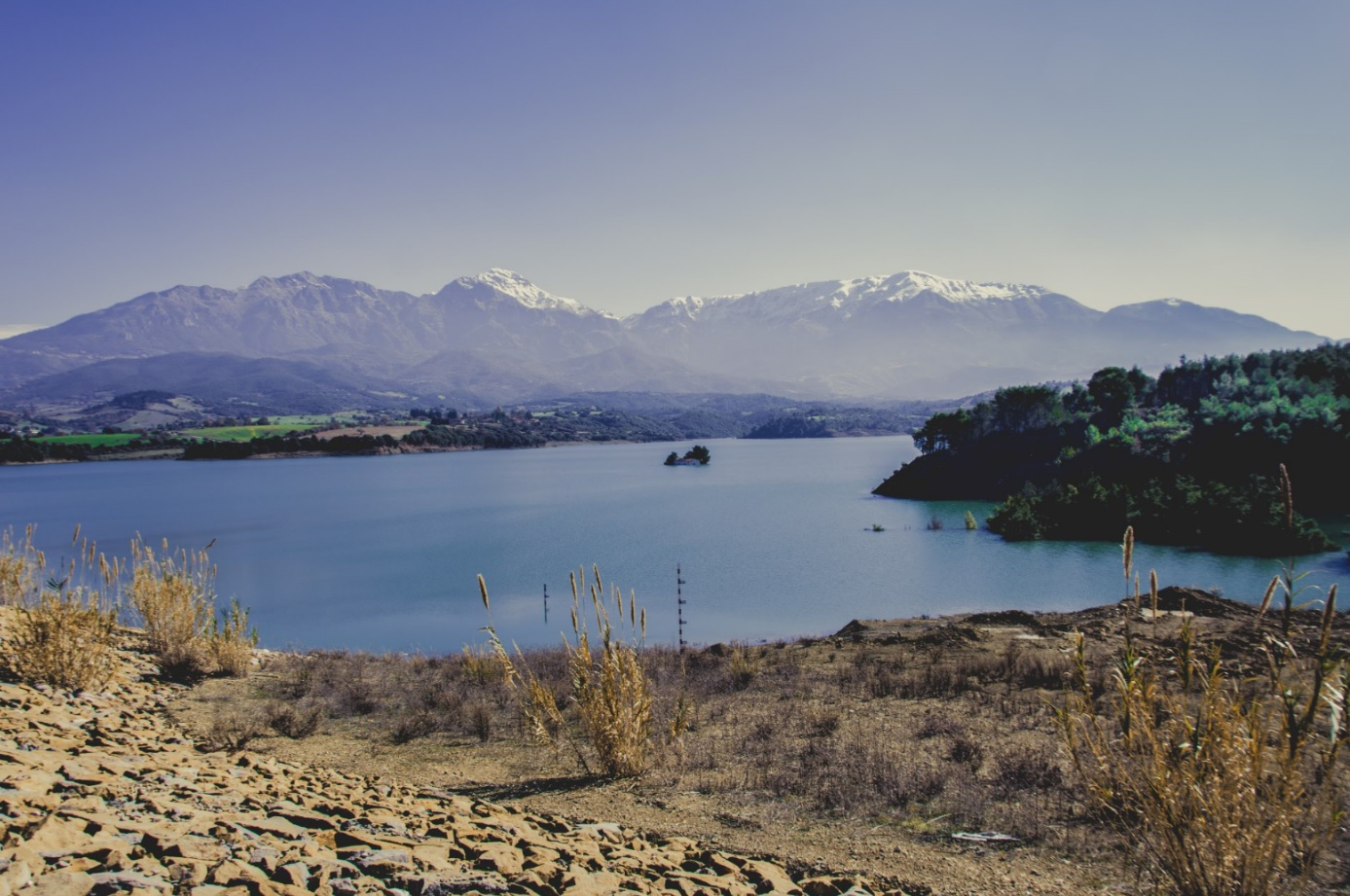
Asteri Dam or Parapiros Dam in Erymanthos municipality. View of the lake. The temporary islet with Saint Theodores' chapel of Mitopolis village sinking. Mt. Erymanthos in the background.

Erymanthos (Greek: Ερύμανθος) is a municipality in Achaea, Western Greece. The seat of the municipality is the town Chalandritsa. The municipality has an area of 582.139 km^{2}. It was named after Mount Erymanthos.

== Municipality ==
The municipality Erymanthos was formed at the 1/1/2011 local government reform by the merger of the following 4 former municipalities and communities, that became municipal units:

- Farres
- Kalentzi
- Leontio
- Tritaia
