= Seires =

Seires Σειρές
- Community
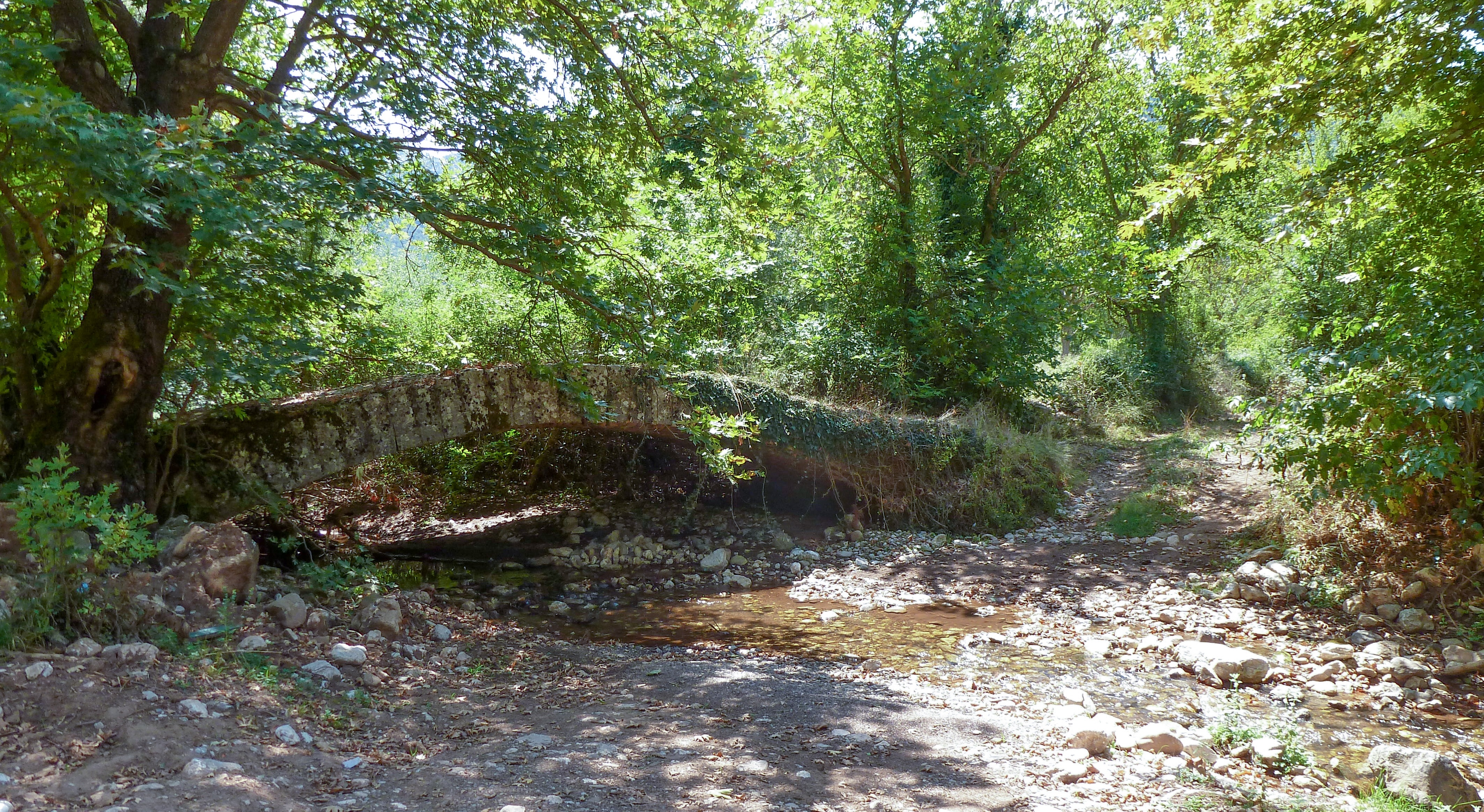
- Tourkogefiro, a stone bridge across the river Seiraios

- Location within Greece
- Coordinates: 37°52′N 21°57′E
- Country: Greece
- Administrative region: West Greece
- Regional unit: Achaea
- Municipality: Kalavryta
- Municipal unit: Aroania

Population (2021)
  - Community: 196
- Time zone: UTC+2 (EET)
  - Summer (DST): UTC+3 (EEST)

Seires (Greek: Σειρές, before 1928: Βερσίτσι - Versitsi) is a mountain village and a community in the municipal unit of Aroania, Achaea, Greece. It was named after the ancient town Seirae, that was part of Arcadian Azania. The community includes the villages Agioi Theodoroi, Agios Georgios, Krini and Thomaiika. Seires is situated at 940 m above sea level. Seires is 3 km west of Alestaina, 4 km northwest of Paos, 5 km east of Psofida and 23 km southwest of Kalavryta.

== Population ==
| Year | Population | Community population |
|---|---|---|
| 1981 | - | 397 |
| 1991 | 107 | - |
| 2001 | 118 | 392 |
| 2011 | 76 | 263 |
| 2021 | 43 | 196 |

== History ==
According to Pausanias, Seirae was an Arcadian city at the border between Cleitor and Psophis. The city was located near the Soron Forest and near the ruined settlement of Paos. Seires was an independent community until 1997, when it joined the newly formed municipality of Aroania.

== See also ==
- List of settlements in Achaea
