= Arcadian Azania =

Arcadian Azania (Greek: Αρκαδική Αζανία) was one of the subdivisions in ancient Arcadia along with Parrhasia and Lycaonia. Ancient Azania was in an area that are now the area of Kalavryta, Achaea and Feneos, western Corinthia. It was inhabited by the Arcadian tribe of the Azanes, named after Azan, son of the mythical king Arcas. The son of Azan was Kleitor, founder of the city Kleitor. Strabo mentioned the Azanes as an Arcadian tribe, one of the oldest Greek tribes.

Azanas was divided into five city states, Kleitor, Kynaitha, Psophis, Pheneos and Thelpusa.

== Cities ==
Cities of Arcadian Azania included:

- Argeathoi
- Kleitor
- Cynaethe or Cynaetha
- Lousoi
- Lykountai
- Nassoi
- Nonakris
- Paos
- Pheneos or Pheneus
- Psophis
- Seirai
- Skotani
- Thelpusa
