= Paus (Arcadia) =

Coordinates: 37°50′28″N 21°59′06″E

Paus or Paos (Ancient Greek: Πάος), was a town in ancient Arcadia. It was situated on the road from Caphyae to Psophis, which road was traversed by Pausanias in the 2nd century. At the distance of seven stadia from Caphyae was Nasi, in the territory of the latter city; and 50 stadia beyond, the road crossed the Ladon. The road then entered a forest of oaks called Soron, and passed through Argeathae, Lycuntes, and Scotane, till it arrived at the ruins of Paus, situated at the end of the forest, and not far from Seirae, which was distant 30 stadia from Psophis, and was the boundary between Cleitor and Psophis.

Its site is located near the modern Neon Paos.
