= Thaliades =

Coordinates: 37°46′56″N 21°56′51″E

Thaliades (Ancient Greek: Θαλιάδες) was a town in Arcadian Azania in ancient Greece, situated on the river Ladon between the towns Halus and Thelpusa. There was a temple of Eleusinian Demeter, with statues of Demeter, her daughter and Dionysos. It was part of the city-state of Kleitor. The ruins that have been found 1 km west of Vachlia are believed to be the remains of Thaliades.
