= Skotani =

Skotani Σκοτάνη
- Community
- Location within Greece
- Coordinates: 37°51′N 22°04′E
- Country: Greece
- Administrative region: West Greece
- Regional unit: Achaea
- Municipality: Kalavryta
- Municipal unit: Paia

Population (2021)
  - Community: 84
- Time zone: UTC+2 (EET)
  - Summer (DST): UTC+3 (EEST)
- Vehicle registration: AX

Skotani (Greek: Σκοτάνη, before 1928: Κόκοβα - Kokova), is a small mountain village and a community in the municipal unit of Paia, Achaea, Greece. The community includes the village Agios Georgios. Skotani is 5 km east of Chovoli, 7 km northeast of Dafni, 7 km southwest of Kleitoria and 20 km south of Kalavryta. Its elevation is about 700 m above sea level.

== Population ==
Year	Village population	Community population
1981	257	-
1991	152	-
2001	272	313
2011	60	99
2021	36	84

== History ==
Scotane was a town of ancient Arcadian Azania and was part of the city-state of Kleitor in classical antiquity. It was located near the river Ladon and the Soron forest. Settlements near Skotane were Lykountes (near present Filia) and Argeathoi.

== See also ==
- List of settlements in Achaea
