= Halus =

Halus may refer to:

- Oryx, an ancient town in Arcadia also known as Halus (Aλοῦς)
- Halos (Thessaly) (Ἅλος), an ancient town in Phthiotis
- Halus (Assyria), a small place in Assyria
