= Dimitra, Arcadia =

Dimitra Δήμητρα
- Community
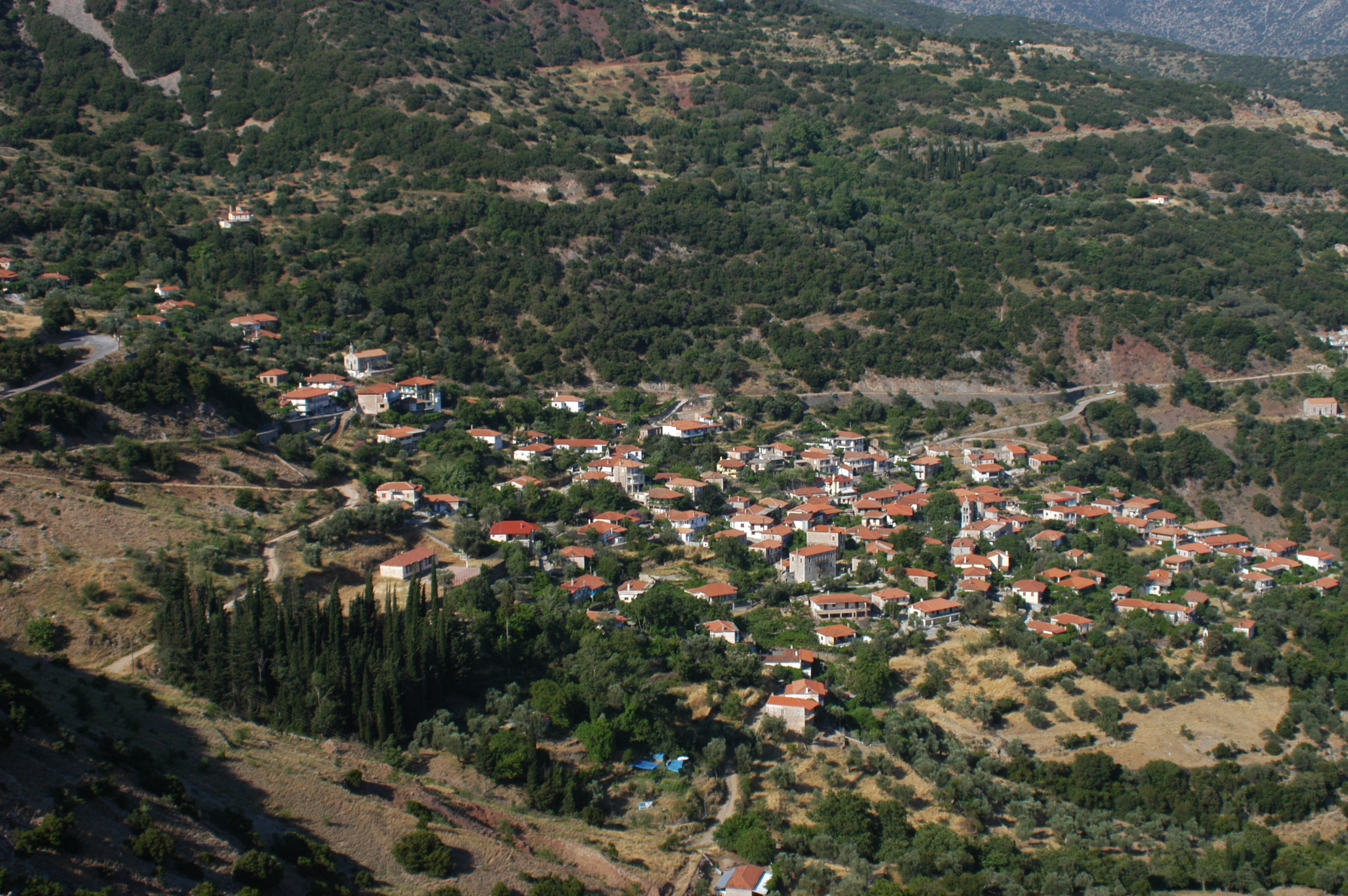

- Location within Greece
- Coordinates: 37°47.1′N 21°55.5′E
- Country: Greece
- Administrative region: Peloponnese
- Regional unit: Arcadia
- Municipality: Gortynia
- Municipal unit: Kontovazaina

Population (2021)
  - Community: 106
- Time zone: UTC+2 (EET)
  - Summer (DST): UTC+3 (EEST)
- Vehicle registration: TP

Dimitra (Greek: Δήμητρα; before 1928: Δίβριτσα – Divritsa) is a village and a community in the municipal unit of Kontovazaina, Arcadia, Greece. The community includes the small village Stavri. Dimitra is situated on a mountain slope on the right bank of the river Ladon. It is 3 km southeast of Kontovazaina, 7 km northwest of Tropaia, 5 km northwest of the Ladon Lake dam and 50 km northwest of Tripoli.

== Population ==
Year	Population village	Population community
1981	302	–
1991	249	–
2001	209	221
2011	103	111
2021	104	106

== See also ==
- List of settlements in Arcadia
