= Kardaritsi =

Kardaritsi Καρδαρίτσι
- Community
- Location within Greece
- Coordinates: 37°49′N 21°51′E
- Country: Greece
- Administrative region: Peloponnese
- Regional unit: Arcadia
- Municipality: Gortynia
- Municipal unit: Kontovazaina
- Elevation: 900 m (3,000 ft)

Population (2021)
  - Community: 54
- Time zone: UTC+2 (EET)
  - Summer (DST): UTC+3 (EEST)

Kardaritsi (Greek: Καρδαρίτσι) is a mountain village in the municipal unit of Kontovazaina in northwest Arcadia, Greece. It is situated on a ridge above the left bank of the river Erymanthos. It is 5 km northwest of Kontovazaina, 6 km southeast of Lampeia (Divry), 9 km southwest of Psofida (Tripotama) and 50 km south of Patras. Historical records trace the existence of the village back to the 18th century. The village has a church dedicated to Saint Nicholas and an impressive cold water spring named “Trani Vrisi” that feeds the village's reservoir.

== Population ==
Historical population

Year	Pop.	±% p.a.
1700	85	—
1861	344	+0.87%
1889	445	+0.92%
1907	489	+0.53%
1920	468	−0.34%
1928	455	−0.35%
1940	410	−0.86%

Year	Pop.	±% p.a.
1951	354	−1.33%
1961	336	−0.52%
1971	191	−5.49%
1988	100	−3.73%
2001	81	−1.61%
2011	41	−6.58%
2021	54	+2.79%

Source: Arcadians (1700-1988), censuses (2001-2021)
