= Georgios Lechouritis =

Fighter of the Greek Revolution (died 1854)

Georgios Papadopoulos (Greek: Γεώργιος Παπαδόπουλος; Lechouri, d. 1854), known as Georgios Lechouritis (Γεώργιος Λεχουρίτης) was a fighter of the Greek Revolution.

He was born in the village of Lechouri, where his family's historic tower still stands. His brothers were Anagnostis and Nikolaos. As the commander of a force from Kalavryta, he participated in the battles of Levidi, Lalas, Dervenakia, Nafplion, and Valtetsi. He fought during all three of Ibrahim Pasha's invasions in Kalavryta, and mainly in the villages of Sopoto και Karnesi. He fought in the siege of the Acropolis in 1827, where he was wounded in the leg. He died of cholera in 1854 in Lechouri, where during the last years of his life.

== Sources ==
- Ioannis Th. Kolokotronis, Ελληνικά Υπομνήματα, Ήτοι Διάφορα Έγγραφα Αφορώντα την Ελληνικήν Επανάστασιν..., Τύποις Χ. Νικολαΐδου Φιλαδελφέως, 1856.
- Georgios Papandreou, Καλαβρυτινή επετηρίς: ήτοι πραγματεία περί της ιστορικής των Καλαβρύτων επαρχίας, published by Michael I. Saliveros, Athens 1906.
