= Lusi (Arcadia) =

Coordinates: 37°58′19″N 22°06′44″E

Lusi or Lousoi (Ancient Greek: Λουσοί, Λοῦσοι, Λουσσοί, or τὰ Λοῦσσα) was a city in the Arcadian Azania toward the north of ancient Arcadia, originally independent of, but afterwards subject to, Cleitor. Lusi was situated in the upper valley of the Aroanius, at about 1,200 metres (3,900 ft) elevation in the Aroanian mountains, near present Kalavryta. The upper valley of the Aroanius consists of two plains, of which the more easterly is the one through which the Aroanius flows, the waters of which force their way through a gorge in the mountains into the plain of Cleitor to the south. The more westerly plain is entirely shut in by a range of hills; and the waters of three streams which flow into this plain are carried off by a katavothra (underground channel), after forming an inundation, apparently the Lacus Clitorius mentioned by Pliny the Elder. The air was damp and cold; and in this locality the best hemlock was grown.

Lusi was still independent in the 58th Olympiad (c. 544 BCE); since one of its citizens (Agesilas) is recorded to have gained the victory in the horse race in the 11th Pythiad. Its territory was ravaged by the Aetolians in the Social War. In the time of Pausanias (2nd century), there were no longer even any ruins of the town. Its name, however, was preserved in consequence of its temple of Artemis Lusia or Hemerasia (the "Soother"). The goddess was so called, because it was here that the daughters of Proetus were purified from their madness. They had concealed themselves in a large cavern, from which they were taken by Melampus, who cured them by sacred expiations. Thereupon their father Proetus founded this temple of Artemis Hemerasia, which was regarded with great reverence throughout the whole Peloponnesus as an inviolable asylum. It was plundered by the Aetolians in the Social War. It was situated near Lusi, at the distance of 40 stadia from Cynaetha. The interior of the temple, with the purification of the daughters of Proetus, is represented on an ancient vase. By the first century BC, staphanitic games (in which the sole prize was a crown) were being held at Lusi.

The remains of Lusi have been found in 1897 by the archeologists Wilhelm Dörpfeld and Adolf Wilhelm, and have been excavated by the Austrian Archaeological Institute at Athens. The temple of Artemis and several buildings of the public centre of the town have been found. In 1928, the nearby villages Soudena Theotokou and Soudena Agiou Vasileiou were renamed Ano Lousoi and Kato Lousoi respectively.
