= Greek National Road 33 =

Trunk road in Greece

Coordinates: 37.8548°N 21.6487°E

National Road 33
- Εθνική Οδός 33
- Route of the EO33 road, in blue
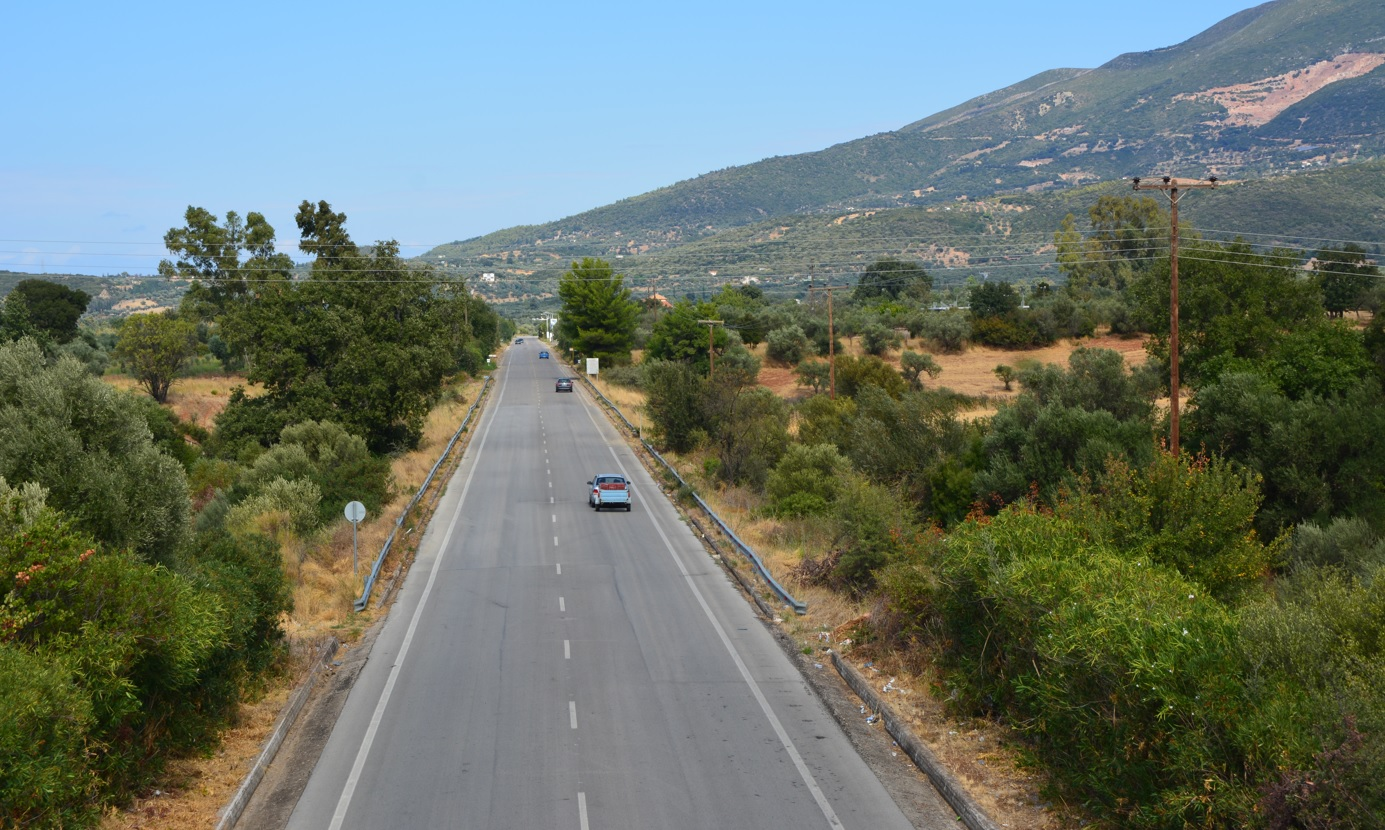
- EO33 near Prevedos, Achaia

Route information
- Length: 134.1 km (83.3 mi)
- Existed: 9 July 1963–present

Major junctions
- North end: Patras
- South end: Levidi

Location
- Country: Greece
- Regions: Western Greece; Peloponnese
- Primary destinations: Patras; Tripotama; Levidi

Highway system
- Highways in Greece; Motorways; National roads
← EO31	→ EO34

Greek National Road 33 (Greek: Εθνική Οδός 33), abbreviated as the EO33, is a national road in southern Greece. It connects Patras with the Greek National Road 74 (Pyrgos - Tripoli) near Levidi, passing through the western and southern foothills of Mount Erymanthos.

== Route ==
The EO33 is officially defined as a northwest–southeast road within the Arcadia and Elis regional units: the EO33 runs between Patras to the northwest and Levidi to the southeast, passing through Tripotama.

The EO33 connects with the EO8 and EO9 in Patras, and the EO74 near Vlacherna.

== History ==
Ministerial Decision G25871 of 9 July 1963 created the EO33 from the old EO56, which existed by royal decree from 1955 until 1963, and followed the same route as the current EO33. The EO33 follows most of the historic EO111, which existed from 1928 to 1955: however, the EO111 deviated from the EO33 between Pangrataika Kalyvia and Tripotama, going via Kleitoria and Aroania, instead of Paos.
