= Oryx (ancient city) =

Ancient city in Greece

Coordinates: 37°45′30″N 22°00′49″E

Oryx (Ancient Greek: Όρυξ), also Halus or Halous (Ἁλοῦς) was town in ancient Arcadia, part of the district of Cleitor. It was situated on the river Ladon, between Nassoi and Thaliades. The location of the ancient city is believed to be in or near the present Ladon reservoir.
