= Paos =

Paos Πάος
- Settlement
- Location within Greece
- Coordinates: 37°51′N 21°59′E
- Country: Greece
- Administrative region: West Greece
- Regional unit: Achaea
- Municipality: Kalavryta
- Municipal unit: Paia

Population (2021)
  - Community: 257
- Time zone: UTC+2 (EET)
  - Summer (DST): UTC+3 (EEST)
- Vehicle registration: AX

Paos (Greek: Πάος, before 1927: Σκούπι - Skoupi) is a village and a community in Achaea, Greece. It is part of the municipal unit of Paia. The community includes the small villages Dechounaiika, Palaios Paos, Potamia and Vesini. It is 25 km southwest of Kalavryta, and 50 km northwest of Tripoli.

== Population ==
Year	Population village	Community population
1981	-	649
1991	415	-
2001	367	508
2011	253	298
2021	211	257

== History ==
The location of the ancient city Paos has been found near the modern village, of which the remainder remains to be excavated. Ancient artifacts and remains of the walls have been found. It had a perimeter of 516 m, and had an almost triangular shape with its point facing west with its acropolis in the middle and some ancient buildings to the south, its springs used to be to the northeast with an aqueduct north of the old city. It was said that Euphorion from Paos gave lodging to the Dioscuri, and ever since kept open house for all men. Paos in later years annexed with the neighboring Kleitor. Pausanias wrote that Paos was a ruined settlement near the city of Seirai.

== Trnasport ==
The EO33 road, which runs between Patras and Levidi via Tripotama, passes through the village: the road is known locally as the EO111, although the real EO111 (which existed from 1928 to 1955) went via Kleitoria and Aroania, instead of Paos.

== Gallery ==
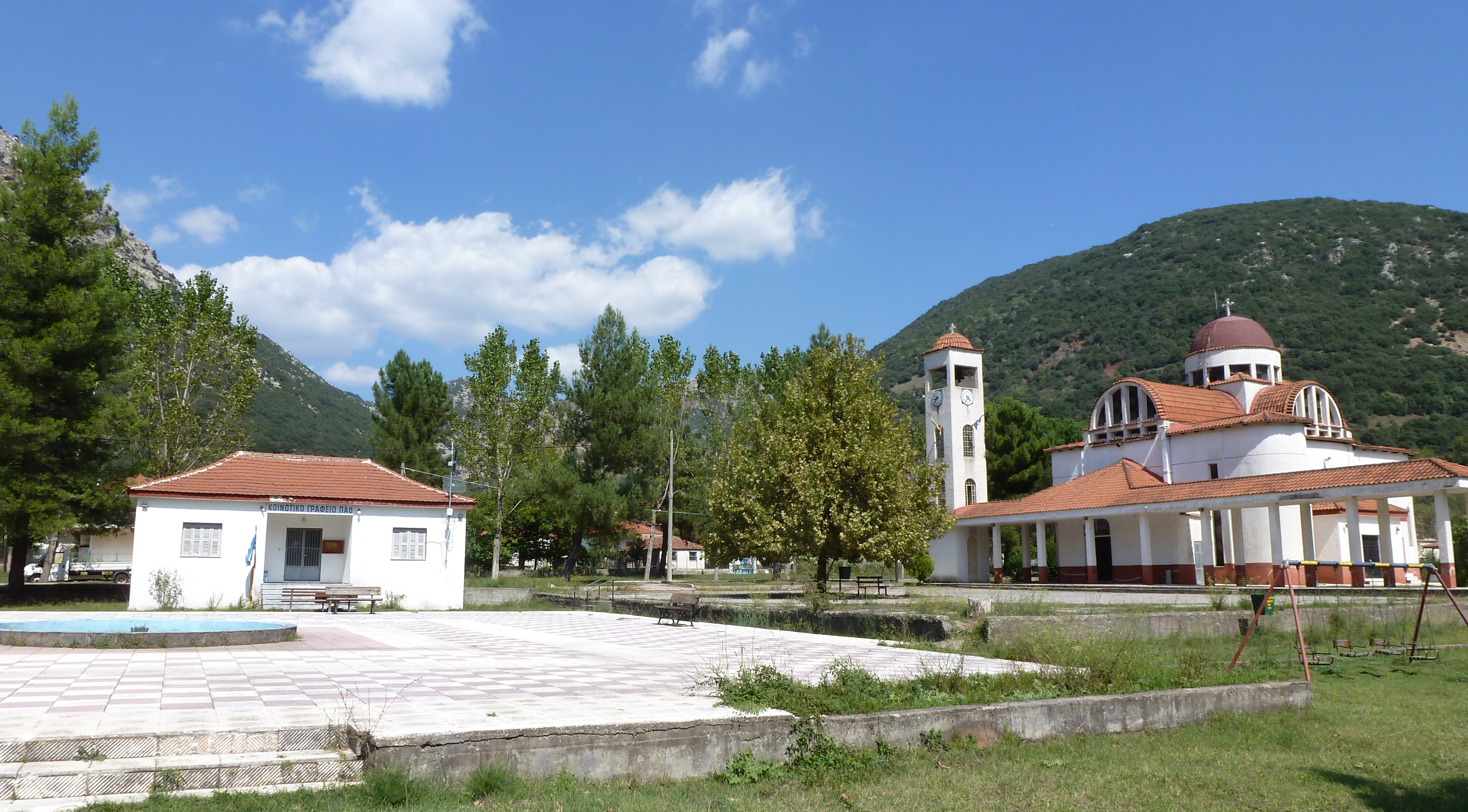
View of the square of the new village of Paos, Achaia.

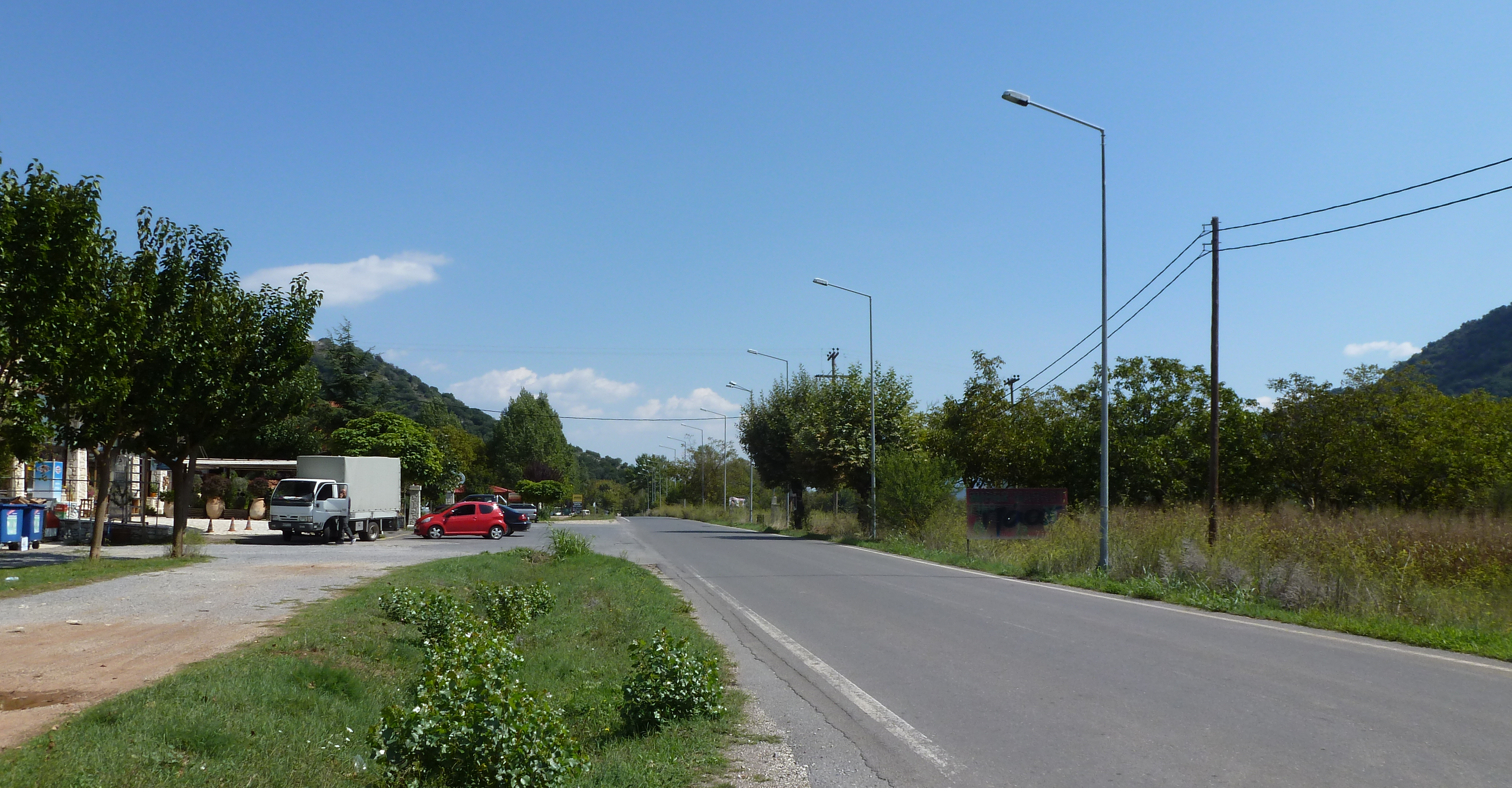
View of "National Road 33" in Greece (Patras, Achaia to Levidi, Arcadia) passing through the new village of Paos, Achaia.

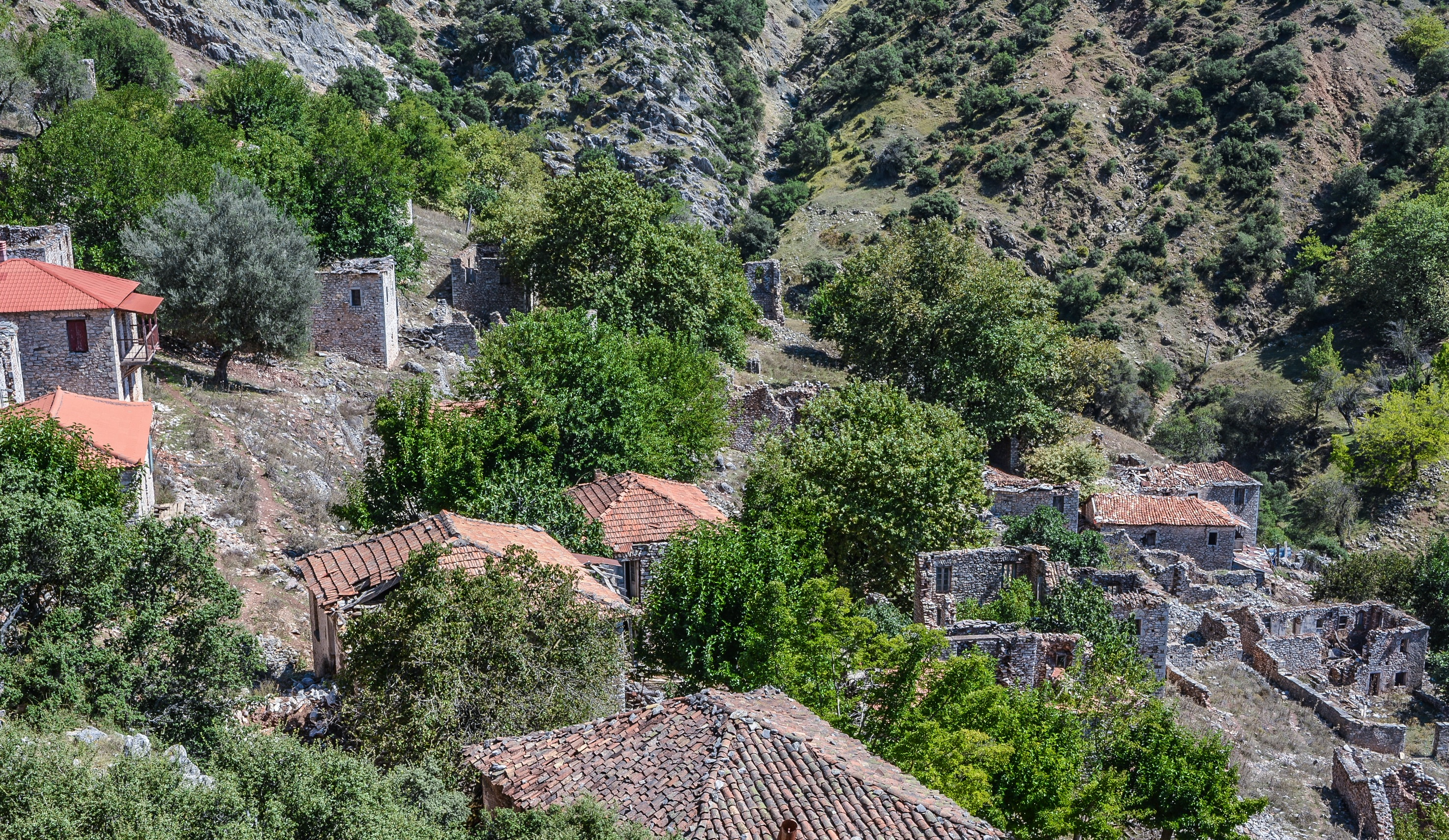
View of the ruins of Paos, abandoned village (ex name: Skoupi), in Achaia.

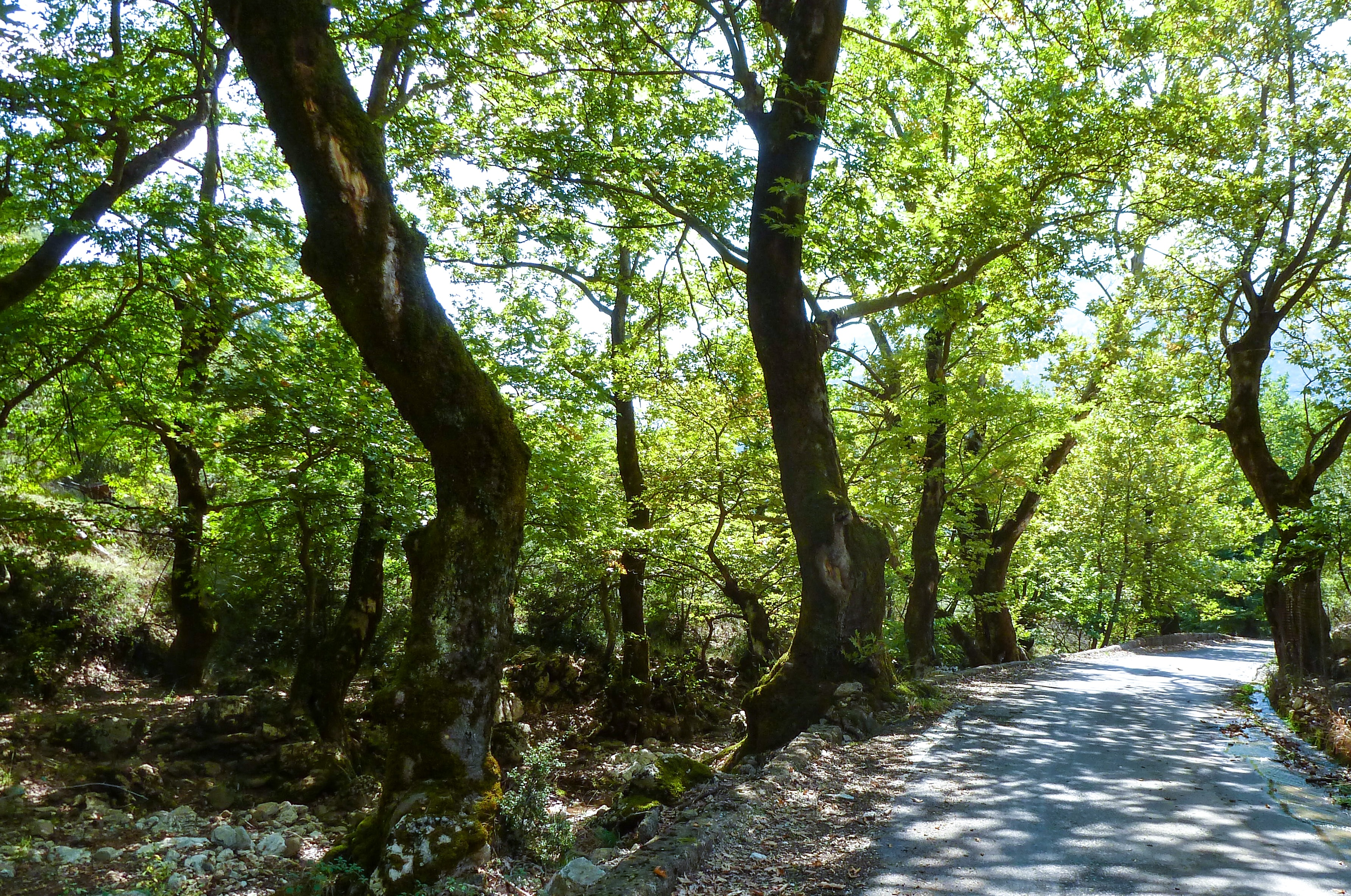
Paos river on the left.

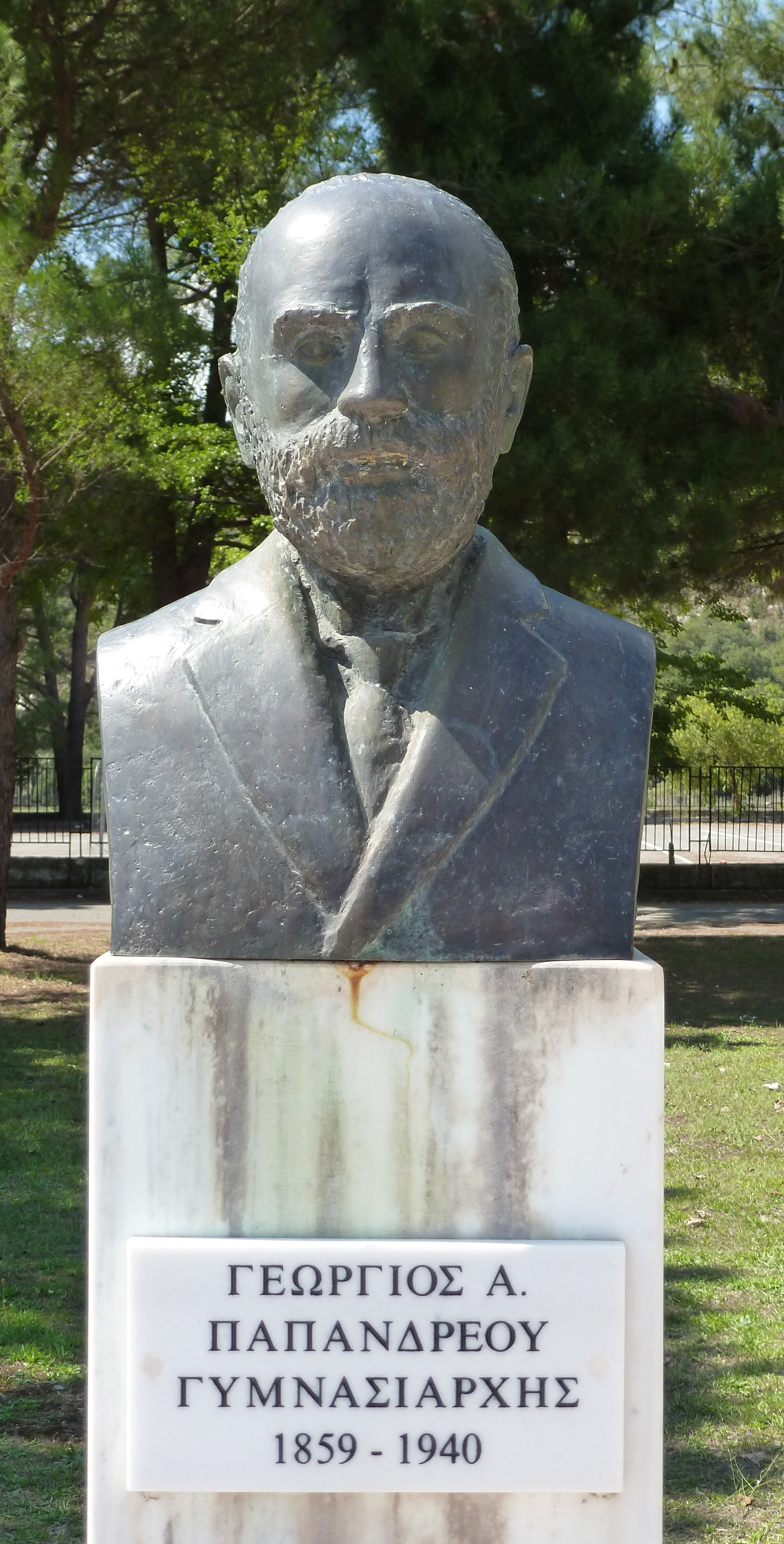
Bust of George A. Panandreou, located in the square of the new village of Paos, Achaia.

== See also ==
- List of settlements in Achaea
