= Alestaina =

Alestaina Αλέσταινα
- Community
- Location within Greece
- Coordinates: 37°52′N 21°58′E
- Country: Greece
- Administrative region: West Greece
- Regional unit: Achaea
- Municipality: Kalavryta
- Municipal unit: Aroania
- Elevation: 900 m (3,000 ft)

Population (2021)
  - Community: 10
- Time zone: UTC+2 (EET)
  - Summer (DST): UTC+3 (EEST)
- Postal code: 250 16
- Vehicle registration: AX

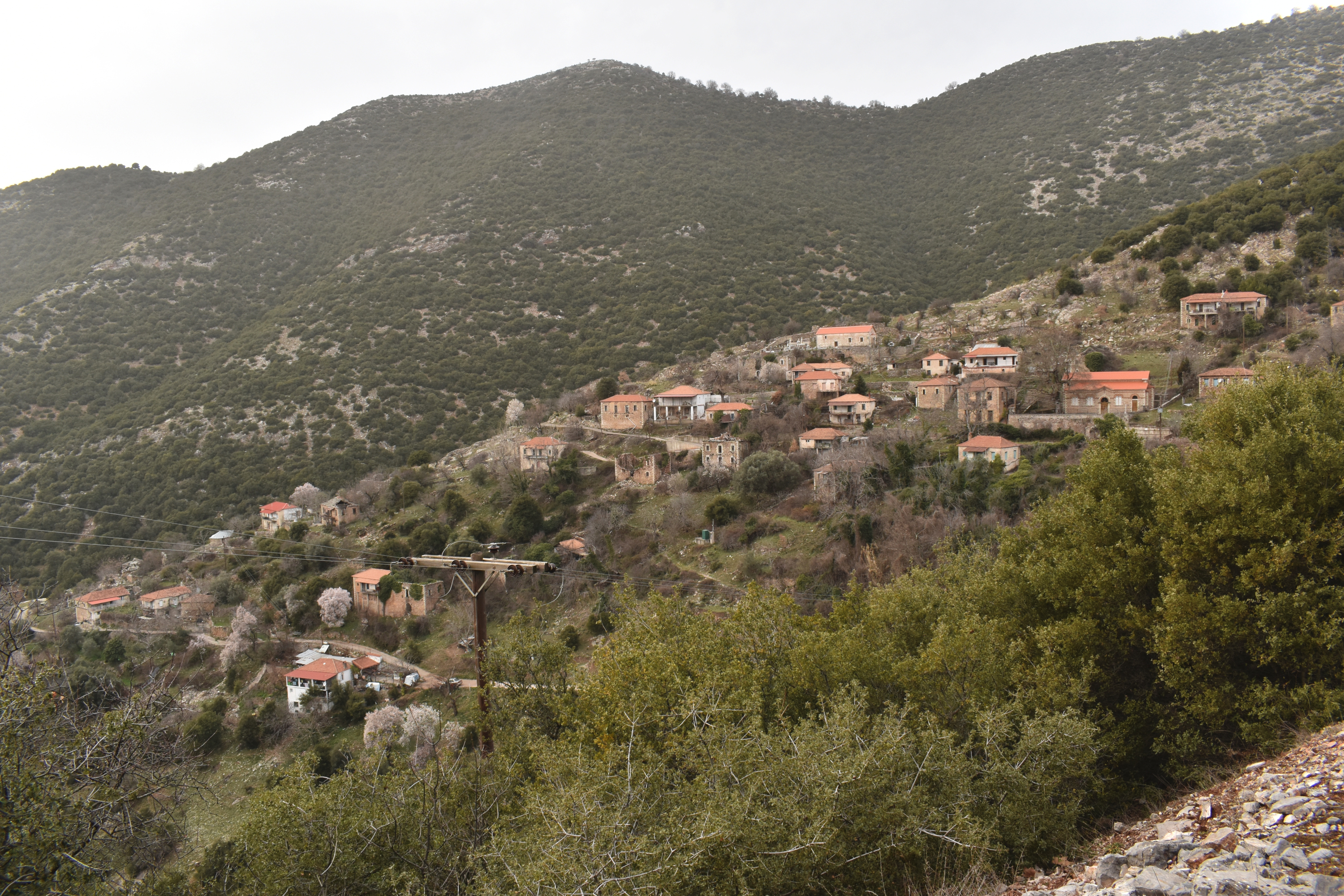
View of the village of Alestaina in Achaea, Greece.

Alestaina (Greek: Αλέσταινα) is a mountain village in the municipal unit of Aroania, Achaea, Greece. It is 2 km south of Agridi, 3 km west of Aroania (village), 2 km north of Paos and 21 km southwest of Kalavryta.

== Population ==
Year	Population
1981	90
1991	52
2001	52
2011	13
2021	10

== See also ==
- List of settlements in Achaea
