= January 12 =

January 12 this year in various calendars
- Monday, 12 January 2026
| Akan | Nwonadwo |
| Armenian | 26 Arach 1475 |
| Aztec | Toxcatl 2, 3 Itzcuintli |
| Babylonian | 22 Kislimu, 2336 SE |
| Balinese pawukon | Menga, Beteng, Laba, Wage, Aryang, Coma of Tambir, Brahma, Tulus, Dewa |
| Bengali | 28 Poush, BS 1432 |
| Chinese | Yang Fire Dog・Heart Mansion; Wood Snake Year, Month 11, Day 24 (Xiaohan, 8 days until Dahan) |
| Common Era | 12 January 2026 CE |
| Coptic | 4 Tobi, AM 1742 |
| Egyptian | 1 Payni, 2774 NE |
| Ethiopian | 4 Ṭer, 2018 Amätä Məhrät |
| French Republican | Décade III, Tridi de Nivôse de l'Année 234 de la République |
| Gregorian | 12 January, AD 2026 |
| Hebrew | 23 Tevet, AM 5786 |
| Hindu | Svātī・Dhṛti; Solar: 28 Pauṣa, 1947 SE; Lunisolar: Navamī, Kṛishna pakṣa of Pauṣa, 2082 VE; Siddhārthin・5126 KY・1,872,587 |
| Icelandic | Mánudagur, 20 Mörsugur 2025 |
| Islamic | 23 Rajab, AH 1447 (using tabular method) |
| ISO week date | 2026-W03-1 |
| Japanese | 24 Shimotsuki, Reiwa 8 (Shōkan, 8 days until Daikan) |
| Julian | 30 December, AD 2025 (AM 7535) |
| Julian day | 2461053 |
| Korean | 24 Jwidal, 4358 DE |
| Maya | 13.0.13.4.10; 8 Muan, 3 Oc |
| Roman | ante diem III Kalendas Ianuarias, MMDCCLXXIX AUC |
| Solar Hijri | 22 Dey, SH 1404 |
| Tibetan | 24 mgo, shing mo sbrul 2152 or 1771 or 999 |

| << | January | | | | | >> |
| Su | Mo | Tu | We | Th | Fr | Sa |
| | | | | 1 | 2 | 3 |
| 4 | 5 | 6 | 7 | 8 | 9 | 10 |
| 11 | 12 | 13 | 14 | 15 | 16 | 17 |
| 18 | 19 | 20 | 21 | 22 | 23 | 24 |
| 25 | 26 | 27 | 28 | 29 | 30 | 31 |
2026

January 12 in recent years
2026 (Monday)
2025 (Sunday)
2024 (Friday)
2023 (Thursday)
2022 (Wednesday)
2021 (Tuesday)
2020 (Sunday)
2019 (Saturday)
2018 (Friday)
2017 (Thursday)

January 12 is the 12th day of the year in the Gregorian calendar; 353 days remain until the end of the year (354 in leap years).

== Events ==
=== Pre-1600 ===
- 475 – Byzantine Emperor Zeno is forced to flee his capital at Constantinople, and his general, Basiliscus gains control of the empire.
- 1528 – Gustav I of Sweden is crowned King of Sweden, having already reigned since his election in June 1523.
- 1554 – Bayinnaung, who would go on to assemble the largest empire in the history of Southeast Asia, is crowned King of Burma.

=== 1601–1900 ===
- 1616 – The city of Belém, Brazil is founded on the Amazon River delta by Portuguese captain Francisco Caldeira Castelo Branco.
- 1792 – Federalist Thomas Pinckney appointed first U.S. minister to Britain.
- 1808 – John Rennie's scheme to defend St Mary's Church, Reculver, founded in 669, from coastal erosion is abandoned in favour of demolition, despite the church being an exemplar of Anglo-Saxon architecture and sculpture.
- 1808 – The organizational meeting leading to the creation of the Wernerian Natural History Society, a former Scottish learned society, is held in Edinburgh.
- 1848 – The Palermo rising takes place in Sicily against the Bourbon Kingdom of the Two Sicilies.
- 1866 – The Royal Aeronautical Society is formed in London.
- 1872 – Yohannes IV is crowned Emperor of Ethiopia in Axum, the first imperial coronation in that city in over 200 years.
- 1895 – The National Trust is founded in the United Kingdom.

=== 1901–present ===
- 1911 – The University of the Philippines College of Law is established.
- 1915 – The United States House of Representatives rejects a proposed constitutional amendment to require states to give women the right to vote.
- 1916 – Oswald Boelcke and Max Immelmann become the first German aviators to earn the Pour le Mérite, receive the German Empire's highest military award, for achieving eight aerial victories each over Allied aircraft.
- 1918 – The Minnie Pit Disaster coal mining accident occurs in Halmer End, Staffordshire, in which 155 men and boys die.
- 1932 – Hattie Caraway becomes the first woman elected to the United States Senate.
- 1933 – Casas Viejas incident: 22 peasants killed by the Security and Assault Corps in Casas Viejas, Spain.
- 1942 – World War II: United States President Franklin D. Roosevelt creates the National War Labor Board.
- 1945 – World War II: The Red Army begins the Vistula–Oder Offensive.
- 1955 – A Martin 2-0-2 and Douglas DC-3 collide over Boone County, Kentucky, killing 15 people.
- 1962 – Vietnam War: Operation Chopper, the first American combat mission and first American helicopter assault in the war, takes place.
- 1964 – Rebels in Zanzibar begin a revolt known as the Zanzibar Revolution and proclaim a republic.
- 1966 – Lyndon B. Johnson states that the United States should stay in South Vietnam until Communist aggression there is ended.
- 1967 – Dr. James Bedford becomes the first person to be cryonically preserved with intent of future resuscitation.
- 1969 – The New York Jets of the American Football League defeat the Baltimore Colts of the National Football League to win Super Bowl III in what is considered to be one of the greatest upsets in sports history.
- 1970 – Biafra capitulates, ending the Nigerian Civil War.
- 1971 – The Harrisburg Seven: Rev. Philip Berrigan and five other activists are indicted on charges of conspiring to kidnap Henry Kissinger and of plotting to blow up the heating tunnels of federal buildings in Washington, D.C.
- 1976 – The United Nations Security Council votes 11–1 to allow the Palestine Liberation Organization to participate in a Security Council debate (without voting rights).
- 1986 – Space Shuttle program: Congressman and future NASA Administrator Bill Nelson lifts off from Kennedy Space Center aboard Columbia on mission STS-61-C as a payload specialist.
- 1990 – A seven-day pogrom breaks out against the Armenian civilian population of Baku, Azerbaijan, during which Armenians were beaten, tortured, murdered, and expelled from the city.
- 1991 – Persian Gulf War: An act of the U.S. Congress authorizes the use of American military force to drive Iraq out of Kuwait.
- 1997 – Space Shuttle program: Atlantis launches from the Kennedy Space Center on mission STS-81 to the Russian space station Mir, carrying astronaut Jerry M. Linenger for a four-month stay on board the station, replacing astronaut John E. Blaha.
- 1998 – Nineteen European nations agree to forbid human cloning.
- 2001 – Downtown Disney opens to the public as part of the Disneyland Resort in Anaheim, California.
- 2004 – The world's largest ocean liner, RMS Queen Mary 2, makes its maiden voyage.
- 2005 – Deep Impact launches from Cape Canaveral on a Delta II rocket.
- 2006 – A stampede during the Stoning of the Devil ritual on the last day at the Hajj in Mina, Saudi Arabia, kills at least 362 Muslim pilgrims.
- 2007 – Comet C/2006 P1 (McNaught), one of the brightest comets ever observed is at its zenith visible during the day.
- 2010 – An earthquake in Haiti occurs, killing between 220,000 and 300,000 people and destroying much of the capital Port-au-Prince.
- 2012 – Violent protests occur in Bucharest, Romania, as two-day-old demonstrations continue against President Traian Băsescu's economic austerity measures. Clashes are reported in numerous Romanian cities between protesters and law enforcement officers.
- 2015 – Government raids kill 143 Boko Haram fighters in Kolofata, Cameroon.
- 2016 – Ten people are killed and 15 wounded in a bombing near the Blue Mosque in Istanbul.
- 2020 – Taal Volcano in the Philippines erupts and kills 39 people.

== Births ==
=== Pre-1600 ===
- 1483 – Henry III of Nassau-Breda (died 1538)
- 1562 – Charles Emmanuel I, Duke of Savoy (died 1630)
- 1576 – Petrus Scriverius, Dutch historian and scholar (died 1660)
- 1577 – Jan Baptist van Helmont, Flemish chemist and physician (died 1644)
- 1588 – John Winthrop, English lawyer and politician, 2nd Governor of the Massachusetts Bay Colony (died 1649)
- 1591 – Jusepe de Ribera, Spanish painter (died 1652)
- 1597 – François Duquesnoy, Flemish sculptor and educator (died 1643)
- 1598 – Jijabai Shahaji Bhosale, mother of Indian king Shivaji (died 1674)

=== 1601–1900 ===
- 1628 – Charles Perrault, French author and academic (died 1703)
- 1673 – Rosalba Carriera, Italian painter (died 1757)
- 1694 – Godscall Paleologue, possibly last member of the Palaiologos dynasty (died ????)
- 1711 – Gaetano Latilla, Italian composer (died 1788)
- 1715 – Jacques Duphly, French organist and composer (died 1789)
- 1716 – Antonio de Ulloa, Spanish general and politician, 1st Spanish Governor of Louisiana (died 1795)
- 1721 – Duke Ferdinand of Brunswick-Wolfenbüttel, Prussian field marshal (died 1792)
- 1723 – Samuel Langdon, American minister, theologian, and academic (died 1797)
- 1724 – Frances Brooke, English author and playwright (died 1789)
- 1729 – Edmund Burke, Irish philosopher, academic, and politician (died 1797)
- 1746 – Johann Heinrich Pestalozzi, Swiss philosopher and educator (died 1827)
- 1751 – Ferdinand I of the Two Sicilies (died 1825)
- 1772 – Mikhail Speransky, Russian academic and politician (died 1839)
- 1786 – Sir Robert Inglis, 2nd Baronet, English politician (died 1855)
- 1792 – Johan August Arfwedson, Swedish chemist and academic (died 1841)
- 1797 – Gideon Brecher, Austrian physician and author (died 1873)
- 1799 – Priscilla Susan Bury, British botanist (died 1872)
- 1822 – Étienne Lenoir, Belgian engineer, designed the internal combustion engine (died 1900)
- 1837 – Adolf Jensen, German pianist and composer (died 1879)
- 1846 – Louis Billot, French Catholic cardinal (died 1931)
- 1849 – Jean Béraud, Russian-French painter and academic (died 1935)
- 1853 – Gregorio Ricci-Curbastro, Italian mathematician (died 1925)
- 1856 – John Singer Sargent, American painter and academic (died 1925)
- 1863 – Swami Vivekananda, Indian monk and philosopher (died 1902)
- 1869 – Bhagwan Das, Indian philosopher, academic, and politician (died 1958)
- 1873 – Spyridon Louis, Greek runner (died 1940)
- 1874 – Laura Adams Armer, American author and photographer (died 1963)
- 1876 – Fevzi Çakmak, Turkish field marshal and politician, Prime Minister of the Turkish Provisional Government (died 1950)
- 1876 – Jack London, American novelist and journalist (died 1916)
- 1876 – Ermanno Wolf-Ferrari, Italian composer and educator (died 1948)
- 1877 – Frank J. Corr, American lawyer and politician, 45th Mayor of Chicago (died 1934)
- 1878 – Ferenc Molnár, Hungarian-American author and playwright (died 1952)
- 1879 – Ray Harroun, American race car driver and engineer (died 1968)
- 1879 – Anton Uesson, Estonian engineer and politician, 17th Mayor of Tallinn (died 1942)
- 1882 – Milton Sills, American actor and screenwriter (died 1930)
- 1884 – Texas Guinan, American entertainer and bootlegger (died 1933)
- 1885 – Thomas Ashe, Irish Republican died while on Hunger Strike (died 1917)
- 1889 – Mirza Basheer-ud-Din Mahmood Ahmad, Indian-Pakistani spiritual leader (died 1965)
- 1890 – Johannes Vares, Estonian poet, physician, and politician (died 1946)
- 1892 – Mikhail Gurevich, Russian engineer and businessman, co-founded the Mikoyan-Gurevich Design Bureau (died 1976)
- 1893 – Hermann Göring, German commander, pilot, and politician, Minister President of Prussia (died 1946)
- 1893 – Alfred Rosenberg, Estonian-German architect and politician, Reich Minister for the Occupied Eastern Territories (died 1946)
- 1894 – Georges Carpentier, French boxer and actor (died 1975)
- 1895 – Leo Aryeh Mayer, Polish-Israeli scholar and academic (died 1959)
- 1896 – Uberto De Morpurgo, Italian tennis player (died 1961)
- 1896 – David Wechsler, Romanian-American psychologist and author (died 1981)
- 1899 – Pierre Bernac, French opera singer and educator (died 1979)
- 1899 – Paul Hermann Müller, Swiss chemist and academic, Nobel Prize laureate (died 1965)

=== 1901–present ===
- 1901 – Karl Künstler, German SS officer (died 1945)
- 1903 – Igor Kurchatov, Russian physicist and academic (died 1960)
- 1903 – Andrew J. Transue, American politician and attorney (Morissette v. United States) (died 1995)
- 1904 – Mississippi Fred McDowell, American singer-songwriter and guitarist (died 1972)
- 1905 – Nihal Atsız, Turkish author, poet, and philosopher (died 1975)
- 1905 – James Bennett Griffin, American archaeologist and academic (died 1997)
- 1905 – Tex Ritter, American actor and singer (died 1974)
- 1906 – Emmanuel Levinas, Lithuanian-French historian, philosopher, and academic (died 1995)
- 1907 – Sergei Korolev, Russian colonel and engineer (died 1966)
- 1908 – Jean Delannoy, French actor, director, and screenwriter (died 2008)
- 1908 – Clement Hurd, American illustrator (died 1988)
- 1910 – Patsy Kelly, American actress and comedian (died 1981)
- 1910 – Luise Rainer, German-English actress (died 2014)
- 1912 – Richard Kuremaa, Estonian footballer (died 1991)
- 1914 – Mieko Kamiya, Japanese psychiatrist and psychologist (died 1979)
- 1915 – Paul Jarrico, American screenwriter and producer (died 1997)
- 1915 – Joseph-Aurèle Plourde, Canadian archbishop and academic (died 2013)
- 1916 – Ruth R. Benerito, American chemist and inventor (died 2013)
- 1916 – P. W. Botha, South African politician, 8th Prime Minister of South Africa (died 2006)
- 1916 – Mary Wilson, Baroness Wilson of Rievaulx, British poet and Spouse of the Prime Minister of the United Kingdom (died 2018)
- 1917 – Walter Hendl, American pianist, composer, and conductor (died 2007)
- 1917 – Jimmy Skinner, Canadian ice hockey player and coach (died 2007)
- 1920 – James Farmer, American activist and politician, co-founded Congress of Racial Equality (died 1999)
- 1920 – Jerzy Zubrzycki, Polish-Australian sociologist and academic (died 2009)
- 1922 – Tadeusz Żychiewicz, Polish journalist and historian (died 1994)
- 1923 – Ira Hayes, American marine who raised the U.S. flag on Iwo Jima (died 1955)
- 1924 – Olivier Gendebien, Belgian racing driver and businessman (died 1998)
- 1925 – Bill Burrud, American television host, producer, and actor (died 1990)
- 1926 – Morton Feldman, American composer and academic (died 1987)
- 1926 – Ray Price, American singer-songwriter and guitarist (died 2013)
- 1928 – Ruth Brown, American R&B singer-songwriter and actress (died 2006)
- 1929 – Jaakko Hintikka, Finnish philosopher and logician (died 2015)
- 1929 – Alasdair MacIntyre, Scottish-American philosopher and academic (died 2025)
- 1930 – Tim Horton, Canadian ice hockey player and businessman, founded Tim Hortons (died 1974)
- 1930 – Jennifer Johnston, Irish author and playwright (died 2025)
- 1930 – Glenn Yarbrough, American singer and actor (died 2016)
- 1932 – Des O'Connor, English entertainer, singer and TV presenter (died 2020)
- 1933 – Pavlos Matesis, Greek author and playwright (died 2013)
- 1934 – Alan Sharp, Scottish-American author and screenwriter (died 2013)
- 1934 – Mick Sullivan, English rugby player and coach (died 2016)
- 1935 – Teresa del Conde, Mexican historian and critic (died 2017)
- 1935 – Kreskin, American mentalist (died 2024)
- 1936 – Jennifer Hilton, Baroness Hilton of Eggardon, English police officer and politician
- 1936 – Raimonds Pauls, Latvian pianist and composer
- 1936 – Brajanath Ratha, Indian poet and activist (died 2014)
- 1936 – Mufti Mohammad Sayeed, Indian lawyer and politician, Indian Minister of Home Affairs (died 2016)
- 1937 – Shirley Eaton, English actress
- 1938 – Qazi Hussain Ahmad, Pakistani scholar and politician (died 2013)
- 1938 – Alan Rees, British racing driver (died 2024)
- 1940 – Bob Hewitt, Australian-South African tennis player
- 1940 – Ronald Shannon Jackson, American drummer and composer (died 2013)
- 1940 – Dick Motz, New Zealand cricketer (died 2007)
- 1941 – Long John Baldry, English-Canadian singer-songwriter and voice actor (died 2005)
- 1941 – Fiona Caldicott, English psychiatrist and psychotherapist (died 2021)
- 1941 – Chet Jastremski, American swimmer and physician (died 2014)
- 1942 – Bernardine Dohrn, American domestic terrorist, political activist and academic
- 1944 – Hans Henning Atrott, German author and theorist (died 2018)
- 1944 – Joe Frazier, American boxer (died 2011)
- 1944 – Cynthia Robinson, American R&B trumpet player and singer (died 2015)
- 1945 – Maggie Bell, Scottish singer-songwriter
- 1946 – Hazel Cosgrove, Lady Cosgrove, Scottish lawyer and judge
- 1946 – George Duke, American keyboard player, composer, and educator (died 2013)
- 1947 – Richard Carwardine, English historian and academic
- 1947 – Tom Dempsey, American football player and educator (died 2020)
- 1947 – Sally Hamwee, Baroness Hamwee, English politician
- 1947 – Emily Stonington, American politician from Montana (died 2019)
- 1948 – Kenny Allen, English footballer
- 1948 – Anthony Andrews, English actor and producer
- 1948 – Gordon Campbell, Canadian educator and politician, 34th Premier of British Columbia
- 1948 – Brendan Foster, English runner and sportscaster
- 1948 – William Nicholson, English author and screenwriter
- 1949 – Kentarō Haneda, Japanese pianist and composer (died 2007)
- 1949 – Ottmar Hitzfeld, German footballer and manager
- 1949 – Hamadi Jebali, Tunisian engineer, journalist, and politician, 19th Prime Minister of Tunisia
- 1949 – Haruki Murakami, Japanese novelist, short-story writer, and essayist
- 1950 – Randy Jones, American baseball player (died 2025)
- 1950 – Sheila Jackson Lee, American lawyer, judge, and politician (died 2024)
- 1950 – Göran Lindblad, Swedish dentist and politician
- 1950 – Bob McEwen, American businessman and politician
- 1950 – Dorrit Moussaieff, Israeli-Icelandic jewelry designer and businesswoman, 5th First Lady of Iceland
- 1951 – Kirstie Alley, American actress and producer (died 2022)
- 1951 – Chris Bell, American singer-songwriter and guitarist (died 1978)
- 1951 – Rush Limbaugh, American talk show host and author (died 2021)
- 1951 – Drew Pearson, American football player and sportscaster
- 1952 – Ramón Fagoaga, Salvadoran footballer
- 1952 – Walter Mosley, American novelist
- 1952 – Phil Perry, American singer-songwriter and producer
- 1952 – Campy Russell, American basketball player
- 1952 – Ricky Van Shelton, American country singer-songwriter and guitarist
- 1952 – John Walker, New Zealand runner and politician
- 1953 – Mary Harron, Canadian director and screenwriter
- 1954 – Howard Stern, American radio host, actor, and author
- 1955 – Tom Ardolino, American rock drummer (died 2012)
- 1955 – Arif Yunusov, Azerbaijani author, historian, and human rights activist.
- 1956 – Nikolai Noskov, Russian rock singer and singer-songwriter
- 1957 – John Lasseter, American animator, director, and producer
- 1957 – Jeremy Sams, English director, playwright, and composer
- 1958 – Christiane Amanpour, English-Iranian journalist
- 1958 – Curt Fraser, American-Canadian ice hockey player and coach
- 1959 – B. Brian Blair, American wrestler and politician
- 1959 – Per Gessle, Swedish singer-songwriter, guitarist, and producer
- 1959 – Sergey Ivanenko, Russian economist and politician (died 2024)
- 1960 – Oliver Platt, Canadian-American actor
- 1960 – Dominique Wilkins, French-American basketball player
- 1961 – Simon Russell Beale, Malaysia-born English actor and historian
- 1962 – Joe Quesada, American author and illustrator
- 1962 – Richie Richardson, Antiguan cricketer
- 1962 – Luna Vachon, American-Canadian wrestler and manager (died 2010)
- 1963 – François Girard, Canadian director and screenwriter
- 1963 – Nando Reis, Brazilian singer-songwriter, guitarist, and producer
- 1964 – Jeff Bezos, American computer scientist and businessman
- 1965 – Nikolai Borschevsky, Russian ice hockey player
- 1965 – Rob Zombie, American singer-songwriter, producer, actor, and director
- 1966 – Olivier Martinez, French actor
- 1966 – Craig Parry, Australian golfer
- 1967 – Vendela Kirsebom, Norwegian-Swedish model and actress
- 1968 – Farrah Forke, American actress (died 2022)
- 1968 – Rachael Harris, American actress and comedian
- 1968 – Junichi Masuda, Japanese director, producer, and composer
- 1968 – Heather Mills, English businesswoman, activist and model
- 1968 – Mauro Silva, Brazilian footballer
- 1969 – David Mitchell, English novelist
- 1969 – Margaret Nagle, American screenwriter and producer
- 1970 – Zack de la Rocha, American singer-songwriter
- 1970 – Raekwon, American rapper
- 1971 – Arman Alizad, Iranian-Finnish tailor and television presenter
- 1971 – Scott Burrell, American basketball player and coach
- 1971 – Peter Madsen, Danish engineer, entrepreneur, and convicted murderer
- 1972 – Priyanka Gandhi, Indian politician
- 1972 – Zabryna Guevara, American actress
- 1972 – Espen Knutsen, Norwegian ice hockey player and coach
- 1972 – Paul Wilson, Australian cricketer and umpire
- 1972 – Toto Wolff, Austrian investor
- 1973 – Brian Culbertson, American pianist and producer
- 1973 – Hande Yener, Turkish singer-songwriter, producer, and actress
- 1974 – Melanie C, English singer-songwriter and actress
- 1974 – Tor Arne Hetland, Norwegian skier
- 1975 – Jason Freese, American saxophonist, songwriter, and producer
- 1975 – Jocelyn Thibault, Canadian ice hockey player and coach
- 1977 – Yoandy Garlobo, Cuban baseball player (died 2023)
- 1978 – Luis Ayala, Mexican baseball player
- 1978 – Jeremy Camp, American singer-songwriter and musician
- 1978 – Maurizio Zaffiri, Italian rugby player
- 1979 – Lee Bo-young, South Korean actress and model
- 1979 – Marián Hossa, Slovak ice hockey player
- 1979 – Grzegorz Rasiak, Polish footballer
- 1979 – David Zabriskie, American cyclist
- 1980 – Amerie, American singer-songwriter, producer, and writer
- 1980 – Bobby Crosby, American baseball player
- 1981 – Niklas Kronwall, Swedish ice hockey player
- 1981 – Angus Macdonald, New Zealand rugby player
- 1981 – João Paulo, Brazilian footballer
- 1981 – Luis Ernesto Pérez, Mexican footballer and manager
- 1982 – Paul-Henri Mathieu, French tennis player
- 1982 – Chris Ray, American baseball player
- 1982 – Hans Van Alphen, Belgian decathlete
- 1982 – Dean Whitehead, English footballer
- 1982 – Dontrelle Willis, American baseball player
- 1984 – Jonathan Zydko, French footballer
- 1985 – Cynthia Addai-Robinson, English-American actress
- 1985 – Artem Milevskyi, Ukrainian footballer
- 1985 – Issa Rae, American actress, writer, director, producer and web series creator
- 1985 – Borja Valero, Spanish footballer
- 1986 – Kehoma Brenner, German rugby player
- 1986 – Miguel Ángel Nieto, Spanish footballer
- 1986 – Dani Osvaldo, Italian-Argentinian footballer
- 1987 – Iván Nova, Dominican baseball player
- 1987 – Naya Rivera, American actress and singer (died 2020)
- 1987 – Salvatore Sirigu, Italian footballer
- 1988 – Claude Giroux, Canadian ice hockey player
- 1988 – Hyun-soo Kim, South Korean baseball player
- 1989 – Thiemo-Jérôme Kialka, German footballer
- 1989 – Axel Witsel, Belgian footballer
- 1991 – Pixie Lott, English singer-songwriter, dancer, and actress
- 1991 – Raquel Rodriguez, American wrestler
- 1991 – Matt Srama, Australian rugby league player
- 1991 – Alex Wood, American baseball player
- 1992 – Ishak Belfodil, Algerian footballer
- 1992 – Samuele Longo, Italian footballer
- 1993 – Jamel Artis, American basketball player
- 1993 – D.O., South Korean singer
- 1993 – Zayn Malik, English singer
- 1993 – Simone Pecorini, Italian footballer
- 1994 – Emre Can, German footballer
- 1995 – Allisha Gray, American basketball player
- 1995 – Mike McGlinchey, American football player
- 1996 – Ella Henderson, English singer and songwriter
- 1997 – Darius Slayton, American football player
- 1998 – Juan Foyth, Argentinian footballer
- 1999 – Xavier Tillman, American basketball player
- 1999 – Tyler Roberts, Welsh footballer
- 2000 – Sven Botman, Dutch footballer
- 2001 – Sam LaPorta, American football player
- 2002 – Eva Lys, German tennis player
- 2005 – Yuika, Japanese singer-songwriter
- 2012 – Artem Kotenko, Ukrainian singer

== Deaths ==
=== Pre-1600 ===
- 690 – Benedict Biscop, English scholar and saint, founded the Monkwearmouth–Jarrow Abbey (born 628)
- 914 – Ahmad Samani, Samanid emir
- 947 – Sang Weihan, Chinese chief of staff (born 898)
- 1140 – Louis I, Landgrave of Thuringia
- 1167 – Aelred of Rievaulx, English monk and saint (born 1110)
- 1320 – John Dalderby, bishop of Lincoln
- 1322 – Marie of Brabant, Queen of France (born 1254)
- 1405 – Eleanor Maltravers, English noblewoman (born 1345)
- 1519 – Maximilian I, Holy Roman Emperor (born 1459)

=== 1601–1900 ===
- 1665 – Pierre de Fermat, French mathematician and lawyer (born 1601)
- 1674 – Giacomo Carissimi, Italian priest and composer (born 1605)
- 1700 – Marguerite Bourgeoys, French-Canadian nun and saint, founded the Congregation of Notre Dame of Montreal (born 1620)
- 1720 – William Ashhurst, English banker and politician, Lord Mayor of London (born 1647)
- 1732 – John Horsley, English-Scottish historian and author (born 1685)
- 1735 – John Eccles, English composer (born 1668)
- 1759 – Anne, Princess Royal and Princess of Orange (born 1709)
- 1765 – Johann Melchior Molter, German violinist and composer (born 1696)
- 1777 – Hugh Mercer, Scottish-American general and physician (born 1726)
- 1778 – François Bigot, French politician (born 1703)
- 1781 – Richard Challoner, English bishop (born 1691)
- 1829 – Karl Wilhelm Friedrich Schlegel, German philosopher, poet, and critic (born 1772)
- 1833 – Marie-Antoine Carême, French chef (born 1784)
- 1834 – William Grenville, 1st Baron Grenville, English academic and politician, Prime Minister of the United Kingdom (born 1759)
- 1856 – Ľudovít Štúr, Slovak philologist and politician (born 1815)
- 1861 – Václav Hanka, Czech philologist and author (born 1791)
- 1892 – James Caulfeild, 3rd Earl of Charlemont, Irish politician, Lord Lieutenant of Tyrone (born 1820)
- 1892 – William Reeves, Irish bishop and historian (born 1815)
- 1899 – Hiram Walker, American businessman, founded Canadian Club (born 1816)

=== 1901–present ===
- 1909 – Hermann Minkowski, Lithuanian-German mathematician and academic (born 1864)
- 1911 – Andreas Papagiannakopoulos, Greek journalist, judge, and politician (born 1845)
- 1916 – Georgios Theotokis, Greek lawyer and politician, 80th Prime Minister of Greece (born 1844)
- 1921 – Gervase Elwes, English tenor and actor (born 1866)
- 1926 – Austin Chapman, Australian businessman and politician, 4th Australian Minister for Defence (born 1864)
- 1934 – Paul Kochanski, Polish violinist and composer (born 1887)
- 1938 – Oscar Florianus Bluemner, German-American painter and illustrator (born 1867)
- 1940 – Ralph Hitz, Austrian-American hotelier (born 1891)
- 1940 – Edward Smith, English lieutenant, Victoria Cross recipient (born 1898)
- 1943 – Jan Campert, Dutch journalist and critic (born 1902)
- 1944 – Lance C. Wade, American commander and pilot (born 1915)
- 1958 – Charles Hatfield, American meteorologist (born 1875)
- 1960 – Nevil Shute, English engineer and author (born 1899)
- 1962 – Ariadna Tyrkova-Williams, Russian journalist and activist (born 1869)
- 1965 – Lorraine Hansberry, American author, playwright, and director (born 1936)
- 1967 – Burhan Asaf Belge, Turkish diplomat (born 1887)
- 1971 – John Tovey, 1st Baron Tovey, English admiral (born 1885)
- 1972 – Ernest Dezentjé, Dutch-Indonesian painter (born 1885)
- 1973 – Roy Franklin Nichols, American historian and academic (born 1896)
- 1974 – Princess Patricia of Connaught (born 1886)
- 1976 – Agatha Christie, English crime novelist, short story writer, and playwright (born 1890)
- 1977 – Henri-Georges Clouzot, French director and screenwriter (born 1907)
- 1983 – Nikolai Podgorny, Ukrainian engineer and politician (born 1903)
- 1988 – Connie Mulder, South African politician (born 1925)
- 1988 – Piero Taruffi, Italian racing driver and motorcycle racer (born 1906)
- 1990 – Laurence J. Peter, Canadian-American author and educator (born 1919)
- 1991 – Robert Jackson, Australian public servant and diplomat (born 1911)
- 1992 – Kumar Gandharva, a Hindustani classical singer (born 1924)
- 1994 – Gustav Naan, Estonian physicist and philosopher (born 1919)
- 1996 – Joachim Nitsche, German mathematician and academic (born 1926)
- 1997 – Jean-Edern Hallier, French author (born 1936)
- 1997 – Charles Brenton Huggins, Canadian-American physician and physiologist, Nobel Prize laureate (born 1901)
- 1998 – Roger Clark, English racing driver (born 1939)
- 1999 – Doug Wickenheiser, Canadian-American ice hockey player (born 1961)
- 2000 – Marc Davis, American animator and screenwriter (born 1913)
- 2000 – Bobby Phills, American basketball player (born 1969)
- 2001 – Luiz Bonfá, Brazilian guitarist and composer (born 1922)
- 2001 – William Redington Hewlett, American engineer and businessman, co-founded Hewlett-Packard (born 1913)
- 2002 – Cyrus Vance, American lawyer and politician, 57th U.S. Secretary of State (born 1917)
- 2003 – Dean Amadon, American ornithologist and author (born 1912)
- 2003 – Kinji Fukasaku, Japanese actor, director, and screenwriter (born 1930)
- 2003 – Leopoldo Galtieri, Argentine general and politician, 44th President of Argentina (born 1926)
- 2003 – Maurice Gibb, Manx-Australian singer-songwriter, guitarist, and producer (born 1949)
- 2003 – Alan Nunn May, English physicist and spy (born 1911)
- 2004 – Olga Ladyzhenskaya, Russian mathematician and academic (born 1921)
- 2005 – Amrish Puri, Indian actor (born 1932)
- 2006 – Pablita Velarde, Santa Clara Pueblo Native American painter (born 1918)
- 2007 – Alice Coltrane, American pianist and composer (born 1937)
- 2007 – James Killen, Australian soldier, lawyer, and politician, 38th Australian Minister for Defence (born 1925)
- 2008 – Max Beck, American intersex advocate (born 1966)
- 2009 – Claude Berri, French actor, director, and screenwriter (born 1934)
- 2010 – Daniel Bensaïd, French philosopher and author (born 1946)
- 2010 – Hasib Sabbagh, Palestinian businessman and philanthropist, co-founded Consolidated Contractors Company (born 1920)
- 2012 – Bjørn G. Andersen, Norwegian geologist and academic (born 1924)
- 2012 – Glenda Dickerson, American director, choreographer, and educator (born 1945)
- 2012 – Bill Janklow, American lawyer and politician, 27th Governor of South Dakota (born 1939)
- 2012 – Charles H. Price II, American businessman and diplomat, United States Ambassador to the United Kingdom (born 1931)
- 2012 – Jim Stanley, American football player and coach (born 1935)
- 2013 – Precious Bryant, American singer-songwriter and guitarist (born 1942)
- 2013 – Flor María Chalbaud, First Lady of Venezuela (born 1921)
- 2013 – Eugene Patterson, American journalist and activist (born 1923)
- 2014 – Alexandra Bastedo, English actress (born 1946)
- 2014 – Connie Binsfeld, American educator and politician, 58th Lieutenant Governor of Michigan (born 1924)
- 2014 – George Dement, American soldier, businessman, and politician (born 1922)
- 2015 – Trevor Colbourn, American historian and academic (born 1927)
- 2015 – Robert Gover, American journalist and author (born 1929)
- 2015 – Carl Long, American baseball player (born 1935)
- 2015 – Elena Obraztsova, Russian soprano and actress (born 1939)
- 2015 – Inge Vermeulen, Brazilian-Dutch field hockey player (born 1985)
- 2017 – William Peter Blatty, American writer and filmmaker (born 1928)
- 2017 – Graham Taylor, English football player and manager (born 1944)
- 2018 – Keith Jackson, American sports commentator and journalist (born 1928)
- 2020 – Sir Roger Scruton, English philosopher and writer (born 1944)
- 2022 – Ronnie Spector, American singer (born 1943)
- 2023 – Lisa Marie Presley, American singer-songwriter (born 1968)
- 2023 – Sharad Yadav, Indian politician, 30th Minister of Civil Aviation, 29th Labour Minister (born 1947)
- 2025 – Leslie Charleson, American actress (born 1945)
- 2025 – Claude Jarman Jr., American actor and producer (born 1934)
- 2026 – Rick Garcia (activist), American LGBTQ rights activist (born 1956)

== Holidays and observances ==
- Christian feast day:
  - Aelred of Rievaulx
  - Benedict Biscop
  - Bernard of Corleone
  - Marguerite Bourgeoys
  - Tatiana
  - January 12 (Eastern Orthodox liturgics)
- Memorial Day (Turkmenistan)
- National Youth Day (India)
- Prosecutor General's Day (Russia)
- Yennayer (Algeria)
- Zanzibar Revolution Day (Tanzania)
