= Erymanthos (river) =

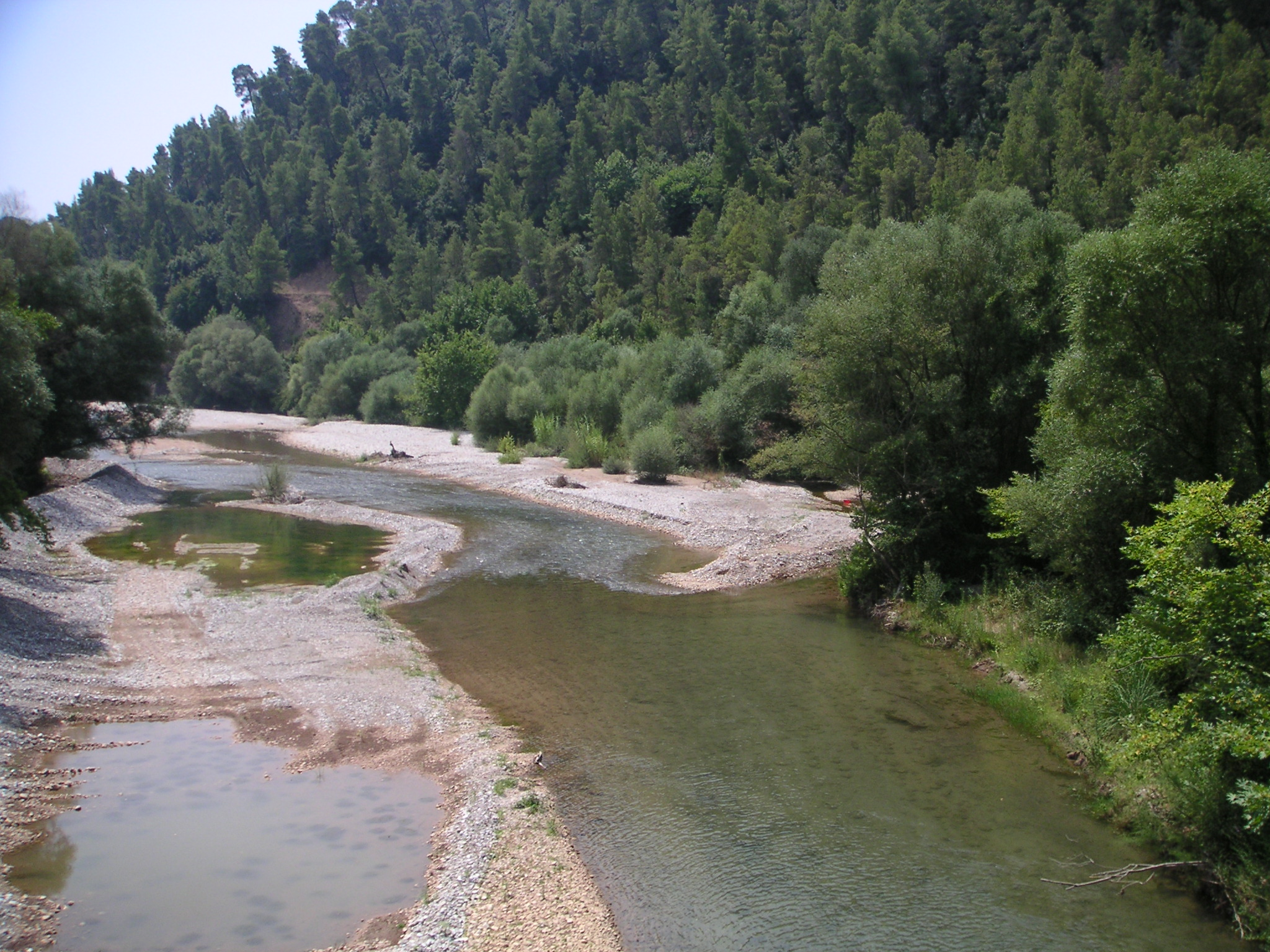
- Native name: Ερύμανθος (Greek)

Location
- Country: Greece

Physical characteristics
- Source
  - location: Peloponnese
- Mouth
  - location: Alfeios
  - coordinates: 37°35′10″N 21°47′42″E
- Length: about 50 km (31 mi)

Basin features
- Progression: Alfeios→ Ionian Sea

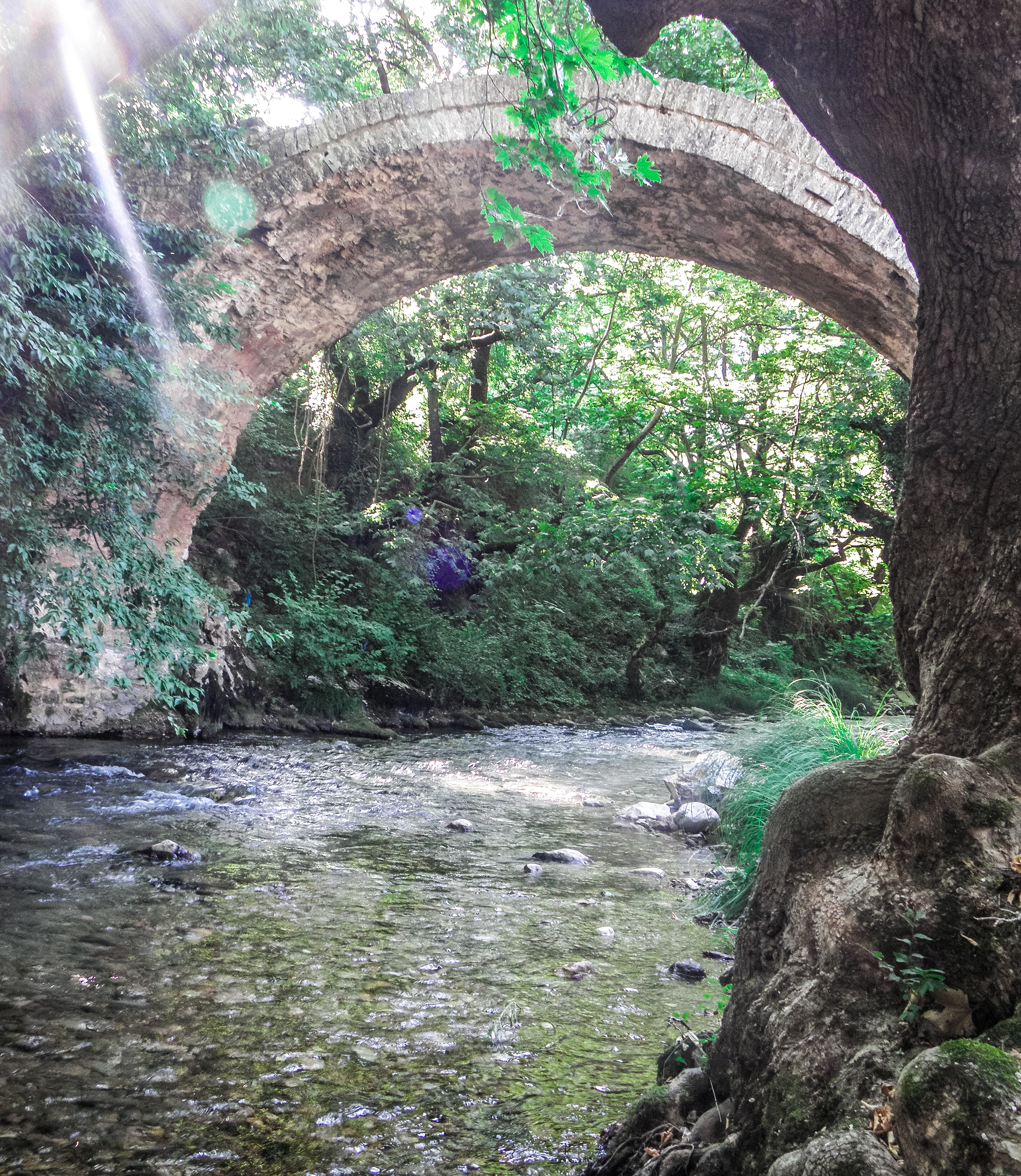
Erymanthos River and the old arched stone bridge in Tripotama village, Achaia-Ilia borders.

The Erymanthos (Greek: Ερύμανθος, Latin: Erymanthus) is a river in the western part of the Peloponnese in Greece. Its source is on the southern slope of Mount Erymanthos, near the village of Agrampela, Achaea. It flows towards the south through a rocky landscape and receives several small tributaries. The river flows into an area rich in pine trees and passes several small mountain villages including Tripotama. Beyond Tripotama it forms the border between Elis and Arcadia. It flows east of the Foloi oak forest. The river empties into the Alfeios 5 km west of the Ladon confluence, near the village Tripotamia.

== Places along the river ==
- Plaka
- Tripotama
- Paralongoi
- Achladini
- Tripotamia
