= Arion (horse) =

Mythical horse

In Greek mythology, Arion or Areion (/əˈraɪ.ən/;Ancient Greek: Ἀρίων, Ἀρείων), is a divinely-bred, fabulously fast, black-maned horse. He saved the life of Adrastus, king of Argos, during the war of the Seven against Thebes.

Arion was (by most accounts) the son of Poseidon and Demeter. When the goddess Demeter was searching for her daughter Persephone, she was pursued by Poseidon. To escape Poseidon, Demeter turned herself into a mare and hid among the mares of Oncius, king of Thelpusa in Arcadia. But Poseidon turned himself into a stallion and mated with Demeter, fathering Arion. Other accounts had Arion as the offspring of Gaia (Earth), or of Zephyrus and a harpy.

Arion was given to the hero Heracles, who rode Arion into battle during his expedition to Elis, and also during his combat with Ares' son Cycnus. Later Heracles gave Arion to Adrastus, the king of Argos. Adrastus took Arion with him on the disastrous expedition of the Seven against Thebes. On the way to Thebes, Arion competed and finished first in the first Nemean Games. At Thebes, when the battle was lost, Arion quickly spirited his master Adrastus away from the battlefield, saving his life, when all the other leaders of the expedition were killed.

== Sources ==
=== Early ===
Arion is mentioned as early as in the Iliad of Homer, where he is described as the "swift horse of Adrastus, that was of heavenly stock." A scholiast on this line of the Iliad explains that Arion was the offspring of Poseidon, who in the form of a horse, mated with Fury (Ἐρινύος) by the fountain Tilphousa in Boeotia. The scholiast goes on to say that Poseidon gave Arion to Copreus, king of Haliartus in Boeotia, who in turn gave him to Heracles, who used him to win a horse race against Ares' son Cycnus, at the shrine of Pagasaean Apollo near Troezen. Heracles then gave Arion to Adrastus, and the horse saved Adrastus' life during the war of the Seven against Thebes. According to the scholiast, "the story is in the Cyclic poets", a reference perhaps to the Cyclic Thebaid. The Hesiodic Shield of Heracles also has "the great horse, black-maned Arion" as Heracles' horse during the hero's fight with Cycnus.

A poetic fragment of Callimachus (third century BC) says:

Arion, the Arcadian horse, did not rage thus at the shrine of Apesantian Zeus.

Apesas is a hill near Nemea, and the line perhaps refers to Arion being raced during the first Nemean Games.

=== Strabo, Apollodorus, Pausanias ===
The late first-century BC to early first-century AD geographer Strabo, says that when Adrastus' chariot was wrecked (at Thebes) he escaped on Arion. The mythographer Apollodorus (first or second century), says that Poseidon sired Arion on the goddess Demeter, when "in the likeness of a Fury she consorted with him". Apollodorus also says that, in the war of the Seven against Thebes, while all the other leaders of the Argive army were killed, only Adastus survived, "saved by his horse Arion".

The second-century geographer Pausanias, by way of explaining why at Thelpusa in Arcadia they call Demeter "Fury", gives a more complete account of the birth of Arion. According to this account, when Demeter was wandering in search of her daughter Persephone (who had been abducted by Hades), Demeter was pursued by Poseidon, "who lusted after her". To escape Poseidon, Demeter turned herself into a mare, and mingled with the mares of Oncius, the son of Apollo. But Poseidon, "realizing that he was outwitted", turned himself into a stallion and mated with Demeter. It was because of her "avenging anger" at Poseidon, that Demeter acquired the surname "Fury". Pausanias says that, according to the Thelpusians, Demeter had, by Poseidon, the horse Arion, and a sister whose name they do not "divulge to the uninitiated". Pausanias goes on to say, however, that according to Antimachus, Arion "of Thelpusa" was the offspring of Gaia (Earth). Pausanias also says that, according to "legend", during Heracles' expedition against Elis, he asked Oncus for Arion, and that Heracles rode Arion into battle when he took Elis, after which Heracles gave Arion to Adrastus. Pausanias says this explains why Antimachus said: "Adrastus was the third lord who tamed him".

=== Statius ===
Arion figures prominently in the Roman poet Statius's first-century Latin epic Thebaid. Statius gives a long description of Arion, as the horse is led out to compete in the race at the first Nemean Games:

Before them all Arion is led, conspicuous by the fire of his ruddy mane. Neptune was the horse’s father, if our elders’ tale be true. He is said to have been the first to bruise the youngling’s mouth with the bit and break him in on the sand of the shore, sparing the lash; for indeed there was no satisfying the horse’s passion to be moving and he was as changeful as a winter sea. Often he was wont to go in harness with the swimming steeds through Ionian or Libyan deep, carrying his caerulean father to every coast. Outstripped, the Clouds were amazed, East and South Winds emulously follow. Nor less was he on land, bringing Amphitryon’s son [Heracles] through deep-furrowed meadows as he fought Eurystheus’ battles; even for him he was wild and unmanageable. Later by gift of the gods he deigned to obey king Adrastus; and in the years between he had grown much tamer.

In Statius' account, Adrastus has let his son-in-law Polynices drive Arion in the race:

Prescient Arion had sensed that another driver stood pulling the reins and in his innocence had dreaded the fell son of Oedipus [Polynices]. Right from the starting line he was at odds with his burden and angry, more truculent in his ardour than of wont. The children of Inachus think him fired by desire for glory, but it is the driver he flees, the driver he threatens in his wild fury as he looks around for his master [Adrastus] all over the field; yet he is ahead of them all.

But Apollo, having promised victory to the seer Amphiaraus, raised up a snaky monster from the underworld in Arion's path, and when Arion saw the monster, he reared sending Polynices sprawling, and the driverless Arion finished first, but the victory went to Amphiaraus: "So in fair division the horse kept his glory, victory went to the seer."

=== Other ===
According to the first-century BC Latin poet Sextus Propertius, "Arion spoke". And according to the fourth-century poet Quintus Smyrnaeus, Arion was begotten by Zephyrus on a harpy.

== See also ==
- List of horses in mythology and folklore
  - Sleipnir
