= Oncae =

Oncae or Onkai (Ancient Greek: Ὄγκαι) was a small town in ancient Arcadia. Its name came from Oncus, a son of Apollo. William Smith suggests that the town may be the same as Onceium.
