= Plaka, Achaea =

Plaka Πλάκα
- Community
- Location within Greece
- Coordinates: 37°55′N 21°52′E
- Country: Greece
- Administrative region: West Greece
- Regional unit: Achaea
- Municipality: Kalavryta
- Municipal unit: Aroania

Population (2021)
  - Community: 88
- Time zone: UTC+2 (EET)
  - Summer (DST): UTC+3 (EEST)

Plaka (Greek: Πλάκα, before 1928: Μουρόχοβα - Mourochova) is a village in the municipal unit of Aroania, Achaea, Greece. It is situated in the southern foothills of Mount Erymanthos. It is 2 km southeast of Agrampela, 4 km west of Livartzi and 25 km southwest of Kalavryta.

== Population ==
Year	Population
1981	207
1991	175
2001	152
2011	99
2021	88

== See also ==
- List of settlements in Achaea
