= Copreus (mythology) =

In Greek mythology, Copreus (Ancient Greek: Κοπρεύς, Kopreús meaning "dung man") may refer to the following individuals:

- Copreus, king of Haliartus and grandson of Orchomenus. He married Pisidice, daughter of Leucon and by her, became the father of Hippoclus and Argynnus. Copreus presented the immortal horse Arion to Heracles. The hero rode the steed in his contest with Cycnus, son of Ares.
- Copreus, herald of King Eurystheus of Mycenae.
