= Kato Vlasia =

Kato Vlasia Κάτω Βλασία
- Settlement
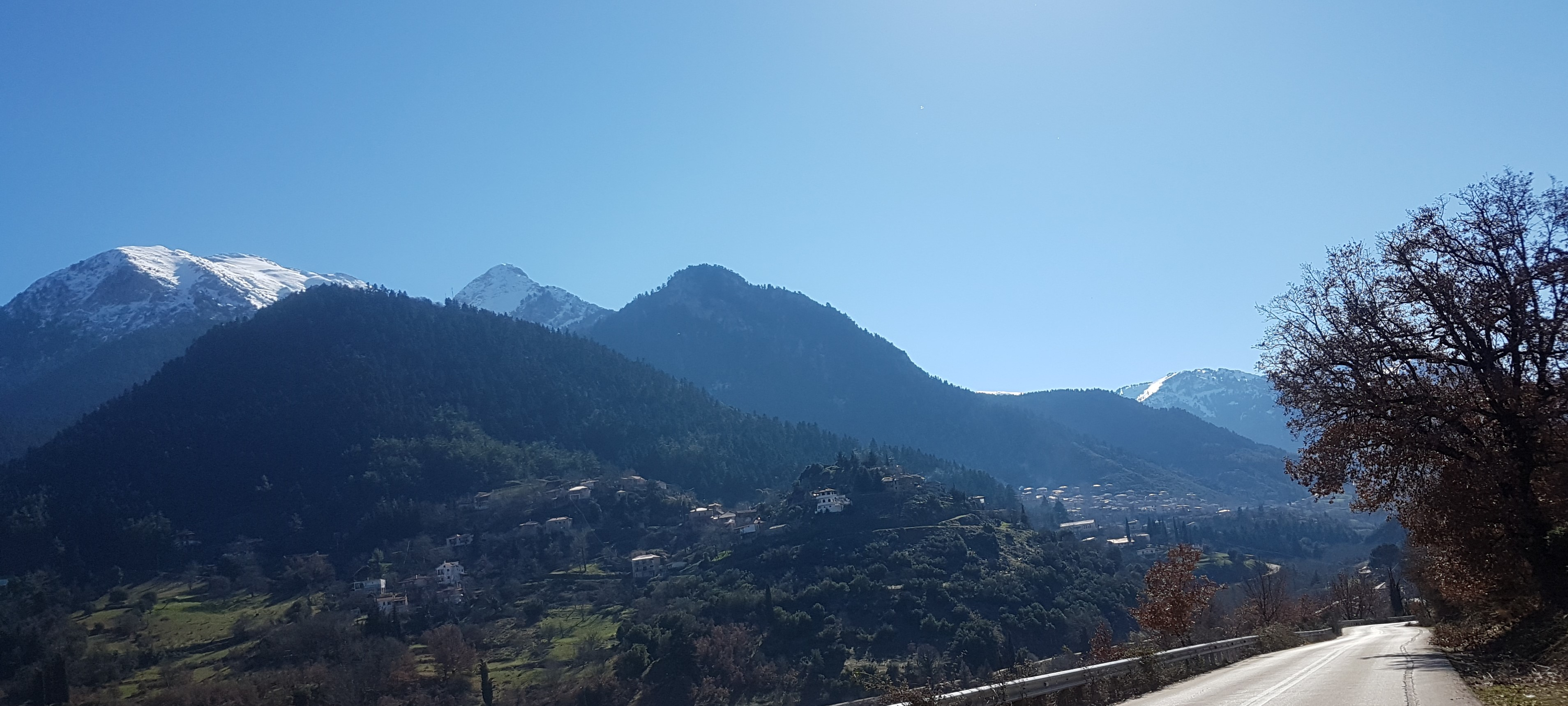

- Location within Greece
- Coordinates: 38°0′N 21°54′E
- Country: Greece
- Administrative region: West Greece
- Regional unit: Achaea
- Municipality: Kalavryta
- Municipal unit: Kalavryta
- Elevation: 803 m (2,635 ft)

Population (2021)
  - Community: 65
- Time zone: UTC+2 (EET)
  - Summer (DST): UTC+3 (EEST)
- Postal code: 250 13
- Area code: 27430

Kato Vlasia (Greek: Κάτω Βλασία) is a mountain village and a community in the municipality of Kalavryta, Achaea, Greece. The community consists of the villages Kato Vlasia, Menychtaiika and Metochi. It is situated at about 800 m elevation. near the source of the river Selinountas, east of the highest summit of Mount Erymanthos. It is 1 km north of Ano Vlasia, 16 km southeast of Chalandritsa and 17 km west of Kalavryta.

== Population ==
Year	Village population	Community population
1981	259	-
1991	193	-
2001	218	280
2011	115	131
2021	61	65

== See also ==
- List of settlements in Achaea
