= Kamenianoi =

Kamenianoi Καμενιάνοι
- Community
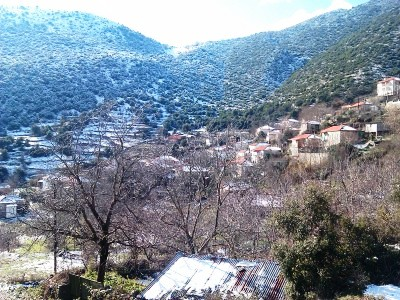
- Kamenianoi, December 2011

- Location within Greece
- Coordinates: 37°57′N 21°55′E
- Country: Greece
- Administrative region: West Greece
- Regional unit: Achaea
- Municipality: Kalavryta
- Municipal unit: Aroania
- Elevation: 900 m (3,000 ft)

Population (2021)
  - Community: 62
- Time zone: UTC+2 (EET)
  - Summer (DST): UTC+3 (EEST)
- Postal code: 250 16
- Vehicle registration: AX

Kamenianoi (Greek: Καμενιάνοι) is a mountain village and a community in the municipal unit of Aroania, Achaea, Greece. The community includes the village Drovolovo. It is situated in the eastern foothills of Mount Erymanthos. Kamenianoi is two km west of Desino, four km southeast of Lechouri and 17 km southwest of Kalavryta.

== Population ==
Year	Population
1981	141
1991	102
2001	79
2011	85
2021	62

== History ==
The name comes from the multitude of furnaces that existed here in the past. According to a myth, Hercules caught the Erymanthian Boar in the area called Kaprivaina.

== See also ==
- List of settlements in Achaea
