= Ano Vlasia =

Ano Vlasia Άνω Βλασία
- Community
- Location within Greece
- Coordinates: 38°00′N 21°55′E
- Country: Greece
- Administrative region: West Greece
- Regional unit: Achaea
- Municipality: Kalavryta
- Municipal unit: Kalavryta
- Elevation: 880 m (2,890 ft)

Population (2021)
  - Community: 131
- Time zone: UTC+2 (EET)
  - Summer (DST): UTC+3 (EEST)
- Postal code: 250 13
- Area code: 27430
- Vehicle registration: AX

Ano Vlasia (Greek: Άνω Βλασία) is a mountain village in the municipality of Kalavryta, Achaea, Greece. It is situated at about 900 m elevation. near the source of the river Selinountas, east of the highest summit of Mount Erymanthos. It is 1 km south of Kato Vlasia, 6 km north of Lechouri and 18 km west of Kalavryta.

== Population ==
Year	Population
1981	296
1991	329
2001	326
2011	165
2021	131

== See also ==
- List of settlements in Achaea
