= Azania (Greece) =

Azania (Ancient Greek: ἡ Ἀζανία) was a region in ancient Arcadia, which was according to Pausanias named after the mythical king Azan. According to Herodotus, the region contained the ancient town of Paus.
