= Onceium =

Onceium or Onkeion (Ancient Greek: Ὄγκειον) was a village in ancient Arcadia upon the river Ladon, near Thelpusa, and containing a temple of Demeter Erinnys. The Ladon, after leaving this temple, passed that of Apollo Oncaeates on the left, and that of the boy Asclepius on the right. The name is derived by Pausanias from Oncus, a son of Apollo, who reigned at this place. Other writers mention a small town Oncae (Ὄγκαι) in Arcadia, which may be the same as Onceium.

Its site is unlocated.
