= Desino =

Village in Achaea, Greece

Desino Δεσινό
- Community
- Location within Greece
- Coordinates: 37°59′N 21°59′E
- Country: Greece
- Administrative region: West Greece
- Regional unit: Achaea
- Municipality: Kalavryta
- Municipal unit: Aroania
- Elevation: 860 m (2,820 ft)

Population (2021)
  - Community: 22
- Time zone: UTC+2 (EET)
  - Summer (DST): UTC+3 (EEST)
- Postal code: 250 16
- Vehicle registration: AX

Desino (Greek: Δεσινό, formerly Τεσινόν - Tesinon) is a mountain village in the municipal unit of Aroania, Achaea, Greece. The village is situated in the eastern foothills of Mount Erymanthos. The name is a corruption of the word στενό "narrow". Desino is 2 km east of Kamenianoi, 4 km west of Priolithos and 15 km southwest of Kalavryta.

== Population ==
Year	Population
1900	174
1981	53
1991	32
2001	16
2011	37
2021	22

== See also ==
- List of settlements in Achaea
