= Paia, Achaea =

Paia Πάϊα
- Municipal unit
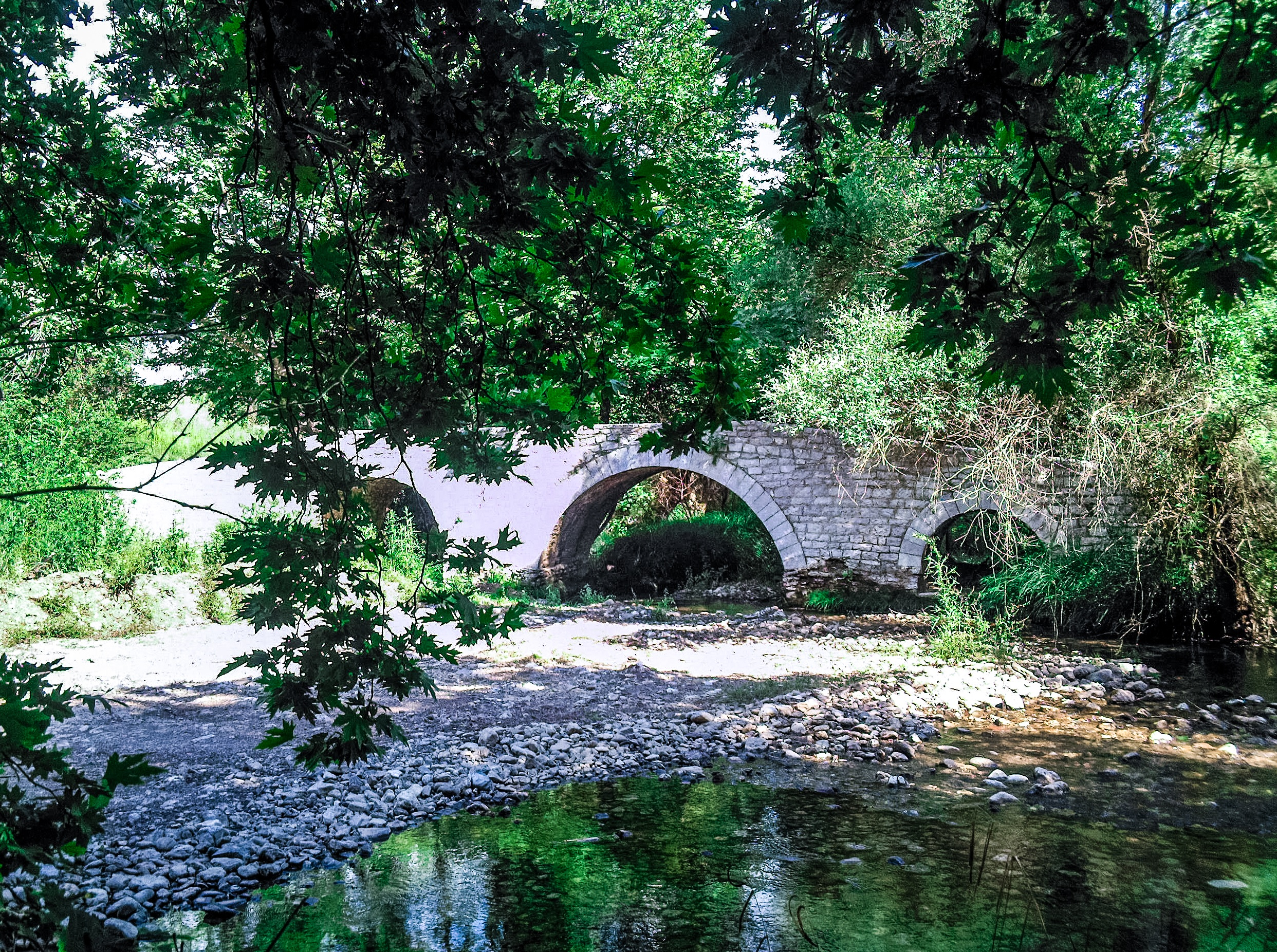
- The three arches stone bridge of Paos River near Dafni

- Location within the regional unit

- Location within Greece
- Coordinates: 37°48′N 22°1′E
- Country: Greece
- Administrative region: West Greece
- Regional unit: Achaea
- Municipality: Kalavryta
- Districts: 7

Area
  - Municipal unit: 99.325 km^{2} (38.350 sq mi)
- Highest elevation: 1,808 m (5,932 ft)
- Lowest elevation: 600 m (2,000 ft)

Population (2021)
  - Municipal unit: 997
  - Municipal unit density: 10.0/km^{2} (26.0/sq mi)
- Time zone: UTC+2 (EET)
  - Summer (DST): UTC+3 (EEST)
- Postal code: 260 05
- Vehicle registration: AX

Paia (Greek: Πάϊα) is a former municipality in Achaea, West Greece, Greece. The seat of the municipality was in Dafni. The municipality was created after the Greek War of Independence and was dissolved in 1912. It was recreated in 1998 under the Capodistrian Plan. Since the 2011 local government reform it is part of the municipality Kalavryta, of which it is a municipal unit. The municipal unit has an area of 99.325 km^{2}.

== Subdivisions ==
The municipal unit Paia is subdivided into the following communities (constituent villages in brackets):

- Amygdalea
- Chovoli (Ano Chovoli, Kato Chovoli)
- Dafni
- Nasia
- Paos (Paos, Vesini, Dechounaiika, Palaios Paos, Potamia)
- Pefko
- Skotani (Skotani, Agios Georgios)

== Population ==
Year	Population
1991	2,623
2001	2,579
2011	1,055
2021	997

== Mayors ==
- Papadimitrakopoulos (1907–1912)
