= Oncius =

Mythical son of Poseidon

In Greek mythology, Oncius (Ancient Greek: Ὄγκιος, romanized: Ónkios, lit. 'case for arrowheads') or Oncus (Ancient Greek: Ὄγκος, romanized: Ónkos, lit. 'point of an arrow') was a son of Apollo and a ruler over Ónkeion (Ὄγκειον), a region of Arcadia adjacent to Thelpusa, as well as eponym of a city Oncae. He owned a herd of horses, in which Demeter tried to hide from Poseidon's advances, changing herself into a mare. Poseidon did mate with her in the shape of a stallion, which resulted in the birth of the fantastic horse Arion. Oncius kept Arion and later gave him away to Heracles as the latter was starting a military campaign against Elis.
