= Caus (Arcadia) =

Settlement in ancient Arcadia

Caus or Kaous (Ancient Greek: Καοῦς) was a settlement in ancient Arcadia, a region of the southern part of Greece located on the Peloponnese peninsula. When Pausanias visited the area in the 2nd century, the place was already ruined. It was situated in the territory of the city Thelpusa, 40 stadia (c. 6 km) from Thelpusa and 25 stadia (c. 4 km) from the river Arsen (Άρσην). There was a sanctuary of Asclepius. Its site is unlocated.
