= Tropaia =

Tropaia Τρόπαια
- Municipal unit
- Location within the regional unit

- Location within Greece
- Coordinates: 37°44′N 21°57′E
- Country: Greece
- Administrative region: Peloponnese
- Regional unit: Arcadia
- Municipality: Gortynia

Area
  - Municipal unit: 187.2 km^{2} (72.3 sq mi)
- Elevation: 732 m (2,402 ft)

Population (2021)
  - Municipal unit: 2,217
  - Municipal unit density: 11.84/km^{2} (30.67/sq mi)
  - Community: 372
- Time zone: UTC+2 (EET)
  - Summer (DST): UTC+3 (EEST)
- Vehicle registration: TP

Tropaia (Greek: Τρόπαια) is a village and a former municipality in Arcadia, Peloponnese, Greece. Since the 2011 local government reform, it is part of the municipality Gortynia, of which it is a municipal unit. The municipal unit has an area of 187.228 km^{2}. As of 2021 the municipal unit has a population of 2,217. The village is located near the Ladon Lake.
