= Livartzi =

Livartzi Λιβάρτζι
- Community
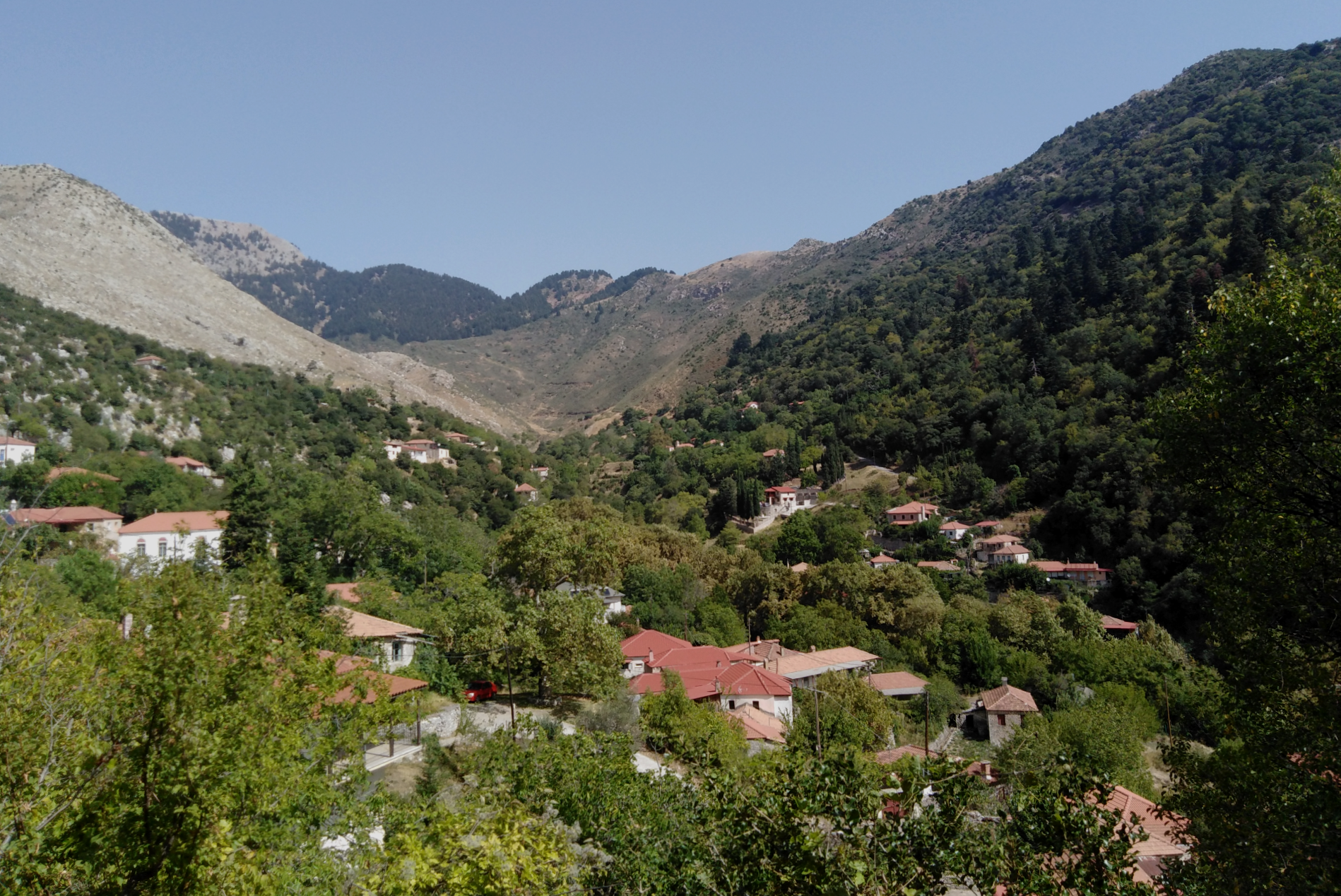
- Livartzi, between the mountains

- Location within Greece
- Coordinates: 37°56′N 21°54′E
- Country: Greece
- Administrative region: West Greece
- Regional unit: Achaea
- Municipality: Kalavryta
- Municipal unit: Aroania

Population (2021)
  - Community: 150
- Time zone: UTC+2 (EET)
  - Summer (DST): UTC+3 (EEST)

Livartzi (Greek: Λιβάρτζι) is a mountain village and a community in the municipal unit of Aroania, Achaea, Greece. The community includes the villages Livadi and Livartzino. Livartzi is situated at 850 m above sea level, in the southeastern foothills of Mount Erymanthos. It is 4 km southwest of Lechouri, 6 km north of Psofida and 21 km southwest of Kalavryta. It is not known when Livartzi was founded, but it existed before the Ottoman rule. In the 19th century, refugees from Mystras settled the area and the population rose to around 3,000 people.

== Population ==
Year	Population village	Population community
19th century	around 3,000	-
1991	289	-
2001	303	422
2011	164	211
2021	118	150

== People ==
- Andreas Papagiannakopoulos (1845–1911), politician

== See also ==
- List of settlements in Achaea
