= Halus (Assyria) =

Halus was a small place in ancient Assyria, probably in the neighbourhood of Artemita, mentioned only by Tacitus.
