= Cleitor =

Town in ancient Arcadia

Coordinates: 37°53′34″N 22°06′12″E

Cleitor or Kleitor (Ancient Greek: Κλείτωρ or Κλήτωρ), also known as Clitorium, was a town in ancient Arcadia.

== Situation ==
It possessed a small territory called Cleitoria or Kleitoria (Κλειτορία), bounded on the east by the territory of Pheneus, on the west by that of Psophis, on the north by that of Cynaetha and Achaea, and on the south by the territories of Caphyae, Tripolis, and Thelpusa. The lofty Aroanian Mountains formed the northeast boundary of the territory of Cleitor, separating it from that of Pheneus. In these mountains the river Aroanius (the modern Phoniatiko) rises, which flowed through the territory of Cleitor from north to south, and falls into the Ladon near the sources of the latter. The valley of this river opens out into two plains. In the upper plain, was situated Lusi, at one time an independent town, but at a later period a dependency of Cleitor. In the lower plain, was the town of Cleitor itself.

Besides the valley of the Aroanius, the upper valley of the Ladon also formed part of the territory of Cleitor. The Ladon rose in this district, and flowed through the southern part of it in a southwesterly direction. The road from Caphyae to Psophis passed through the Cleitoria, and was traversed by Pausanias in the 2nd century. At the distance of seven stadia from Caphyae was Nasi, in the territory of the latter city; and 50 stadia beyond, the road crossed the Ladon, but Pausanias does not mention where the territory of Cleitor began. The road then entered a forest of oaks called Soron, and passed through Argeathae, Lycuntes, and Scotane, till it arrived at the ruins of Paus, situated at the end of the forest, and not far from Seirae, which was distant 30 stadia from Psophis, and was the boundary between the Cleitorii and Psophidii. This forest, in the time of Pausanias, contained bears and wild boars. Paus is also mentioned by Herodotus, who speaks of it as a town of Azania.

Cleitor was situated in the midst of the aforementioned plain, upon a hill of moderate height between two rivulets. The more important of these streams, running south of the town, was also called Cleitor (the modern Mostitsaiiko). The other stream rises in the district of Lusi, and falls into the Cleitor just beyond the remains of the ancient city. The Cleitor, after flowing rapidly through the plain, falls into the Aroanius, at the distance of seven stadia from the city of Cleitor, according to Pausanias; but the real distance is at least double. A little north of the junction of the river Cleitor with the Aroanius, the remains of a small Doric temple were discovered.

== Mythology ==
Cleitor is said to have been founded by a hero of the same name, the son of the Arcadian king Azan. The Cleitoria formed an important part of the Azanian district. The Cleitorian fountain, described below, was regarded as one of the curiosities of Azania; and the Aroanian Mountains, on the summits of which the daughters of Proetus wandered in their madness, are called the Azanian Mountains. The Cleitorians were renowned among the Peloponnesians for their love of liberty (τὸ Κλειτορίων φιλελεύθερον καὶ γενναῖον), of which an instance is cited even from the mythical times, in the brave resistance they offered to Sous, king of Sparta. According to Plutarch, Sous was besieged by the Cleitorians in a dry place with no water. He made an agreement with them that he would return to them all his conquests if him and all his men would be allowed water to drink. He then offered his entire kingdom to any of his soldiers who would resist drinking. When all of them drank, Soos himself refused to, and continued to wage war against the Cleitorians.

Their power was increased by the conquest of Lusi, Paus, and other towns in their neighbourhood. In commemoration of these conquests they dedicated at Olympia a brazen statue of Zeus, 18 feet (5.5 m) in height, which was extant in the time of Pausanias, who has preserved the inscription upon it.

== History ==
Cleitor seems to have occupied an important position among the Arcadian cities. In the Theban War it carried on hostilities against Orchomenus. In the Social War it belonged to the Achaean League, and in 220 BC it bravely repelled the assaults of the Aetolians, who attempted to scale the walls. It was sometimes used as the place of meeting of the Achaean League. Strabo mentions Cleitor among the Arcadian towns destroyed in his time, or of which scarcely any traces existed; but this is not correct, since it was not only in existence in the time of Pausanias, but it continued to coin money as late as the reign of Septimius Severus.

== Sights ==
Pausanias gives only a brief description of Cleitor. He says that its three principal temples were those of Demeter, Asclepius, and Eileithyia; that at the distance of four stadia from the city the Cleitorians possessed a temple of the Dioscuri, whom they called the great gods; and that further on the summit of a mountain, at the distance of 30 stadia from the city, there was a temple of Athena Coria.

In the territory of Cleitor was a celebrated fountain, of which those who drank were said to have lost forever their taste for wine. A spring of water, gushing forth from the hill on which the ruins stand, is usually supposed to be this miraculous fountain; but Ernst Curtius places it in the territory of Lusi, because it is said to have been situated upon the confines of the Cleitoria, and is mentioned in connection with the purification of the daughters of Proetus by Melampus, which is said to have taken place at Lusi.

Another marvel in the territory of Cleitor was the singing fish of the river Aroanius. These fish, which were called ποικιλίαι, were said to sing like thrushes. Pausanias relates that he had seen these fish caught; but that he had never heard them sing, although he had remained for that purpose on the banks of the river till sunset, when they were supposed to be most vocal. These singing fish are also mentioned by Athenaeus and Pliny the Elder. The former writer cites three authorities in proof of their existence, of whom Philostephanos placed them on the Ladon, Mnaseas in the Cleitor, and the Peripatetic Clearchus in the Pheneatic Aroanius. Pliny improperly identifies them with the exocoetus or adonis, which was a sea-fish. The ποικιλία was probably trout, and was so called from its spotted and many-coloured scales.

== Remains ==
The walls of the ancient city may still be traced in nearly their full extent. They enclose an irregular oblong space, not more than a mile in circumference; they were about 15 feet (4.6 m) in thickness, and were fortified with towers. But the space enclosed by these walls seems to have been properly the acropolis of the ancient city, since the whole plain was discovered to be covered with stones and pottery, mixed with quadrangular blocks and remains of columns. There are remains three Doric templates and a theatre towards the western end of the hill.

Its site is near the modern Kleitoria.
