= Agridi, Achaea =

Agridi Αγρίδι
- Community
- Location within Greece
- Coordinates: 37°54′N 21°59′E
- Country: Greece
- Administrative region: West Greece
- Regional unit: Achaea
- Municipality: Kalavryta
- Municipal unit: Aroania
- Elevation: 860 m (2,820 ft)

Population (2021)
  - Community: 64
- Time zone: UTC+2 (EET)
  - Summer (DST): UTC+3 (EEST)
- Postal code: 250 16
- Vehicle registration: AX

Agridi (Greek: Αγρίδι) is a village in the municipal unit of Aroania, Achaea, Greece. The village is situated in a mountainous area, 2 km northwest of Aroania and 19 km southwest of Kalavryta.

== Population ==
Year	Population
1981	184
1991	121
2001	106
2011	92
2021	64

== See also ==
- List of settlements in Achaea
