= Andreas Papagiannakopoulos =

Greek judge and politician

Andreas Papagiannakopoulos (Greek: Ανδρέας Παπαγιαννακόπουλος, 1845–1911) was a judge and a politician of Kalavryta and Achaea.

He was born in Leivartzi and moved to Patras at a young age. He studied law and was engaged in journalism, publishing the newspapers Pelopas and Toxotis in 1876. He became a municipal police officer in 1883 but was dismissed a year later.

He was elected as a Member of the Hellenic Parliament for Kalavryta in 1885 and continuously from 1887 until 1910 for the Achaea Prefecture. He tried to be elected as mayor of Patras but without success.

He died on January 12, 1911, in Athens at the Evangelismos Hospital. His funeral oration was read by Loukas Roufos.

== See also ==
- Politics of Greece
