= Chovoli =

Chovoli Χόβολη
- Community
- Location within Greece
- Coordinates: 37°51′54″N 22°00′58″E
- Country: Greece
- Administrative region: West Greece
- Regional unit: Achaea
- Municipality: Kalavryta
- Municipal unit: Paia

Population (2021)
  - Community: 69
- Time zone: UTC+2 (EET)
  - Summer (DST): UTC+3 (EEST)
- Postal code: 25016
- Area code: +30 26920
- Vehicle registration: AX

Chovoli (Greek: Χόβολη) is a community in the municipal unit of Paia in southern Achaea, Greece. In 2021 its population was 69. The community includes two villages, Ano Chovoli and Kato Chovoli.
