= Lechouri =

Lechouri Λεχούρι
- Community
- Location within Greece
- Coordinates: 37°57′N 21°56′E
- Country: Greece
- Administrative region: West Greece
- Regional unit: Achaea
- Municipality: Kalavryta
- Municipal unit: Aroania
- Elevation: 891 m (2,923 ft)

Population (2021)
  - Community: 170
- Time zone: UTC+2 (EET)
  - Summer (DST): UTC+3 (EEST)

Lechouri (Greek: Λεχούρι) is a mountain village and a community in the municipal unit of Aroania, Achaea, Greece. The community includes the villages Kerasia and Selli. The village is situated at about 900 m (3,000 ft) above sea level, near the mountain Kallifoni, which is part of the Erymanthos range. It is 4 km (2.5 mi) northeast of Livartzi, 6 km (3.7 mi) south of Ano Vlasia, 4 km (2.5 mi) northwest of Kamenianoi and 18 km (11 mi) southwest of Kalavryta.

== Population ==
Year	Population	Community population
1981	258	-
1991	124	-
2001	235	354
2011	209	288
2021	132	170

== History ==
Historian G. Poretsano has two theories about the origin of the name Lechouri. The first is the Homeric word "ουρέα" which means "mountain peaks" and the second is the Cretan word "λέσκες" which means "ridges".

Roman villas and cemeteries have been found in the region. Lechouri was the crossroads of mountain trails leading to Patras by Vlasia and Chalandritsa. Many fighters in the 1821 Greek War of Independence came from Lechouri. Imvraim Arnaoutoglou, the Turkish commander of Kalavryta, was imprisoned in the village tower after the liberation of the town. This tower, also known as Lechouritis Tower, has been converted into a museum. Another important monument of the past is the small 16th century monastery of St George. To Lechouri now kept alive with rich events Association of Athens and Patras.

== See also ==
- List of settlements in Achaea
