= Agrampela, Achaea =

Agrampela Αγράμπελα
- Community
- Location within Greece
- Coordinates: 37°55′N 21°50′E
- Country: Greece
- Administrative region: West Greece
- Regional unit: Achaea
- Municipality: Kalavryta
- Municipal unit: Aroania
- Elevation: 855 m (2,805 ft)

Population (2021)
  - Community: 112
- Time zone: UTC+2 (EET)
  - Summer (DST): UTC+3 (EEST)
- Postal code: 250 12
- Vehicle registration: AX

Agrampela (Greek: Αγράμπελα, before 1928: Πορετζού - Poretzou) is a village and a community in the municipal unit of Aroania, Achaea, Greece. The community includes the village Platanitsa. It is situated in the southern foothills of the Mount Erymanthos. It is 2 km northwest of Plaka, 8 km east of Kalentzi and 26 km southwest of Kalavryta.

== Population ==
Year	Population	Community population
1896	268	-
1935	159	-
1951	155	-
1981	217	-
1991	89	-
2001	180	340
2011	41	99
2021	40	112

== History ==
In the 1700 Venetian census, the village had 29 families. The village was known as Poretzou (Πορετζού) until 1928. Its inhabitants were known as Poretsanos, which became a surname for several people. Together with Platanitsa, it was a municipal district of Lampeia until 1912, when it became an independent community. The community was transferred from the Elis Prefecture to Achaea in 1974.

== See also ==
- List of settlements in Achaea
