= Kontovazaina =

Kontovazaina Κοντοβάζαινα
- Municipal unit
- Location within the regional unit

- Location within Greece
- Coordinates: 37°48′N 21°54′E
- Country: Greece
- Administrative region: Peloponnese
- Regional unit: Arcadia
- Municipality: Gortynia

Area
  - Municipal unit: 137.5 km^{2} (53.1 sq mi)

Population (2021)
  - Municipal unit: 991
  - Municipal unit density: 7.21/km^{2} (18.7/sq mi)
  - Community: 322
- Time zone: UTC+2 (EET)
  - Summer (DST): UTC+3 (EEST)
- Vehicle registration: TP

Kontovazaina (Greek: Κοντοβάζαινα) is a village and a former municipality in Arcadia, Peloponnese, Greece. Since the 2011 local government reform it is part of the municipality Gortynia, of which it is a municipal unit. The municipal unit has an area of 137.496 km^{2}. Achaea borders the municipal unit to the north and Elis to the west. It is situated in mountainous northwestern Arcadia, between the rivers Erymanthos and Ladon. The Ladon reservoir is in easternmost part of the municipal unit, and the mountain Afrodisio (1,447 m elevation) is in the north. The village Kontovazaina is situated in a valley, 3 km north of the Ladon. It is considered a traditional settlement.

== Subdivisions ==
The municipal unit Kontovazaina is subdivided into the following communities (constituent villages in brackets):

- Dimitra (Dimitra, Stavri)
- Kardaritsi
- Kontovazaina
- Monastiraki (Monastiraki, Arsinaia, Peleki)
- Paralongoi (Paralongoi, Agios Nikolaos, Petas)
- Vachlia (Vachlia, Pera Vachlia)
- Velimachi (Velimachi, Aposkia, Soudeli)
- Vidiaki
- Voutsis

== Population ==
Year	Population village	Population municipal unit
1991	622	-
2001	500	2,048
2011	386	1,171
2021	322	991

== See also ==
- List of settlements in Arcadia
- List of traditional settlements of Greece
