= Cynaetha =

Town in the north of ancient Arcadia

Coordinates: 38°01′59″N 22°07′41″E

Cynaetha, Kynaetha or Kynaitha (Ancient Greek: Κύναιθα), or Cynaethae, Kynaethae or Kynaithai (Κύναιθαι), was a town in the north of ancient Arcadia, situated upon the northern slope of the Aroanian Mountains, which divided its territory from those of Cleitor and Pheneus. It was the northernmost town of Arcadia; the inhabitants of Cynaetha were the only Arcadians who lived beyond the natural boundaries of Arcadia. Their valley sloped down towards the Corinthian Gulf; and the river which flowed through it fell into the Corinthian Gulf a little to the east of Bura: this river was called in ancient times Erasinus or Buraicus, now the river of Vouraikos. The climate and situation of Cynaetha are described by Polybius as the most disagreeable in all Arcadia.

The same author observes that the character of the Cynaethians presented a striking contrast to that of the other Arcadians, being a wicked and cruel race, and so much disliked by the rest of their countrymen, that the latter would scarcely hold any intercourse with them. He attributes their depravity to their neglect of music, which had tended to humanize the other Arcadians, and to counteract the natural rudeness engendered by their climate.

Although Strabo mentions Cynaetha as one of the Arcadian towns no longer existing in his time, it must have been restored at some period after its destruction by the Aetolians, as it was visited by Pausanias, who noticed in the agora altars of the gods, a sanctuary of Dionysus, and a statue of the emperor Hadrian. The Cynaetheans gave to Olympia the statue of Zeus which held a thunderbolt in his hand. At the distance of two stadia from the town was a fountain of cold water, called Alyssus (Άλυσσος), because it was said to cure rabies.

It was located near Kastro tis Orias, near present Kalavryta.
