= Scotane =

Ancient Greece settlement

Coordinates: 37°50′02″N 22°01′38″E

Scotane or Skotane (Ancient Greek: Σκοτάνη) was a settlement in ancient Arcadia, Greece. Pausanias wrote that it was located near Nasi, Lycuntes and Argeathae, which places it in the southern part of present Achaea.

Its site is located near the modern Dafni. The modern village of Skotani was renamed after the ancient town, but is located 7 km from Dafni.
