= Lycuntes =

Lycuntes or Lykountes (Ancient Greek: Λυκούντης) was a settlement in ancient Arcadia, Greece. Pausanias wrote that it was located near Nasi, Scotane and Argeathae, which places it in the southern part of present Achaea.

Its site is unlocated.
