= Ladon Lake =

- Τεχνητή Λίμνη Λάδωνα (Greek)
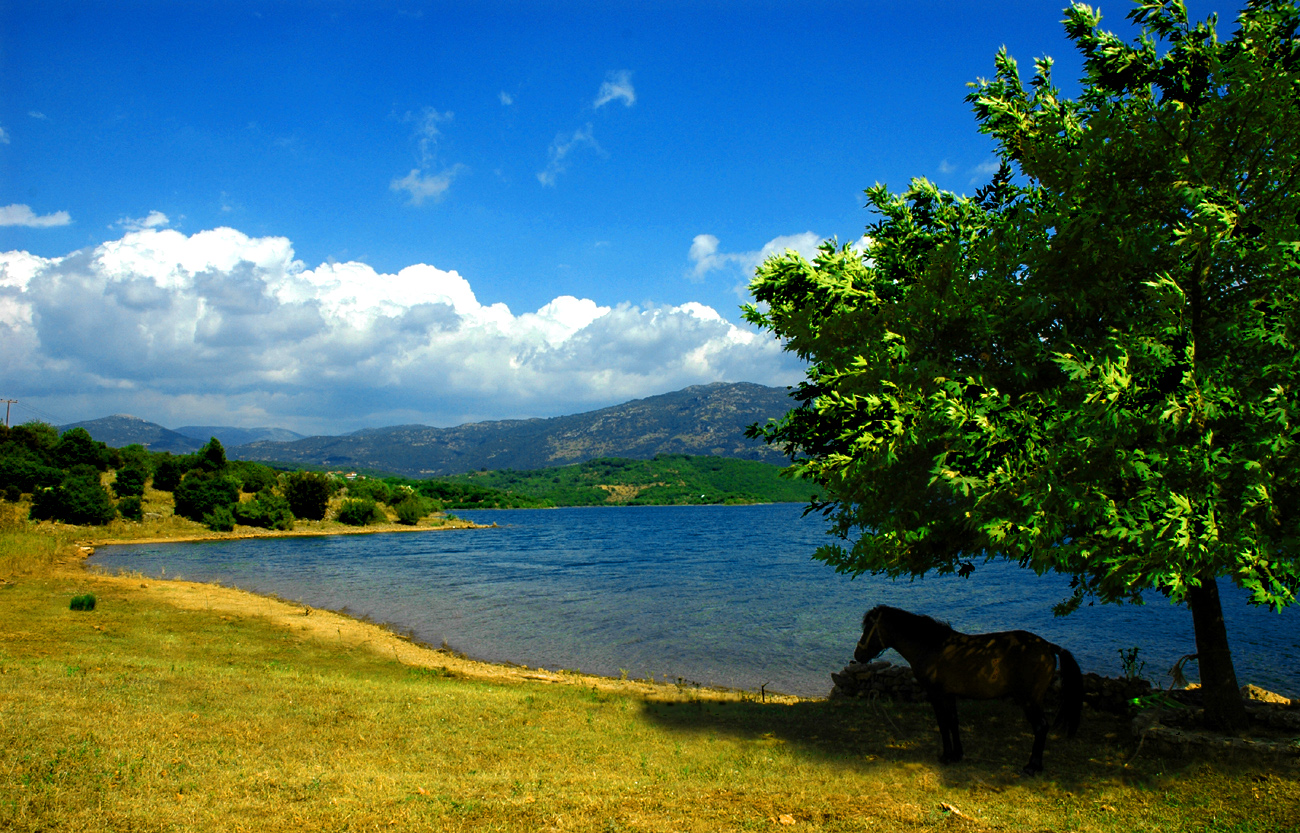

- Location within Greece
- Location: Arcadia, Greece
- Coordinates: 37.76°N 22.01°E
- Type: artificial lake
- Primary inflows: Ladon (river)
- Primary outflows: Ladon (river)
- Basin countries: Greece
- Max. length: 8 km (5.0 mi)
- Max. width: 0.6 km (0.37 mi)
- Surface area: 4 km^{2} (1.5 sq mi)
- Water volume: 0.046 km^{3} (37,000 acre⋅ft)
- Settlements: Kleitor, Kontovazaina, Tropaia

The Ladon Lake (Greek: Τεχνητή Λίμνη Λάδωνα, Techniti Limni Ladona) or the Ladon Reservoir is an artificial lake in the upper part of the river Ladon, in the northwestern part of Arcadia, Greece. The 50 m high dam was built in 1955. The reservoir is situated in a sparsely populated, mountainous area. It is completely in the municipality Gortynia, municipal units Kleitor, Kontovazaina and Tropaia.

The reservoir lies on the Alfeios river.

== See also ==
- List of lakes in Greece
- List of reservoirs
