= Seirae =

Seirae or Seirai (Ancient Greek: Σειραί), was a town in ancient Arcadia, located 30 stadia from Psophis, on the road from Cleitor, and on the boundary between the two.

Its site is unlocated.
