= Argeathae =

Ancient Greek settlement

Argeathae or Argeathai (Ancient Greek: Αργέαθαι) was a settlement in ancient Arcadia, Greece. Its location has not been found, but Pausanias wrote that it was located near Nasi, Lycuntes and Scotane, which places it in the southern part of present Achaea. It was located in the Arcadian Azania, near the Soron forest.
