= Thelpusa =

Town in the west of ancient Arcadia

Coordinates: 37°42′38″N 21°52′44″E

Thelpusa or Thelpousa (Ancient Greek: Θελποῦσα, Ancient Greek: Θέλπουσα), or Telphusa or Telphousa (Τέλφουσα), was a town in the west of ancient Arcadia, situated upon the left or eastern bank of the river Ladon. Its territory was bounded on the north by that of Psophis, on the south by that of Heraea, on the west by the Eleia and Tisatis, and on the east by that of Cleitor, Tripolis, and Theisoa. The town is said to have derived its name from a nymph, the daughter of the Ladon, which nymph was probably the stream flowing through the lower part of the town into the Ladon.

It is first mentioned in history in 352 BCE, when the Lacedaemonians were defeated in its neighbourhood by the Thebans. In 222 BCE, it was taken by Antigonus Doson, in the war against Cleomenes III, and it is also mentioned in the campaigns of Philip V of Macedon. Its coins show that it belonged to the Achaean League. When Pausanias visited Thelpusa in the second century, the city was nearly deserted, so that the agora, which was formerly in the centre of the city, then stood at its extremity. He saw a temple of Asclepius, and another of the twelve gods of Olympus, of which the latter was nearly leveled with the ground. Pausanias also mentions two temples of some celebrity in the neighbourhood of Thelpusa, one above and the other below the city. The one above was the temple of Demeter Eleusinia, containing statues of Demeter, Persephone and Dionysus, made of stone. The temple below the city was also sacred to Demeter, whom the Thelpusians called Erinys (Fury). This temple is alluded to by Lycophron and Callimachus. It was situated at a place called Onceium, where Oncus, the son of Apollo, is said once to have reigned. Below this temple stood the temple of Apollo Oncaeates, on the left bank of the Ladon, and on the right bank that of the boy Asclepius, with the sepulchre of Trygon, said to have been the nurse of Asclepius.

The ruins of Thelpusa stand upon the slope of a considerable hill near the village of Vánena (or Vanaina), north of Toubitsi. When visited in the 19th century, it was described as bearing only few traces of the walls of the city. At the ruined church of St. John, near the rivulet, there were some Hellenic foundations and fragments of columns. The saint is probably the successor of Asclepius, whose temple, as we learn from Pausanias, stood longest in the city. There were likewise the remains of a Roman building, about 12 yards (metres) long and 6 wide, with the ruins of an arched roof. There are also near the Ladon some Hellenic foundations, and the lower parts of six columns. Below Vánena there stands upon the right bank of the Ladon the ruined church of St. Athanasius the Miraculous, where William Martin Leake found the remains of several columns. Pausanias, in describing the route from Psophis to Thelpusa, after mentioning the boundaries between the territories of the two states, first crosses the river Arsen, and then, at the distance of 25 stadia, arrives at the ruins of a village Caus and a temple of Asclepius Causius, erected upon the roadside. From this place the distance to Thelpusa was 40 stadia.
