= Aroania =

Aroania Αροάνια
- Municipal unit
- Location within the regional unit

- Location within Greece
- Coordinates: 37°53′N 22°1′E
- Country: Greece
- Administrative region: West Greece
- Regional unit: Achaea
- Municipality: Kalavryta
- Districts: 11

Area
  - Municipal unit: 173.8 km^{2} (67.1 sq mi)
- Elevation: 782 m (2,566 ft)

Population (2021)
  - Municipal unit: 1,259
  - Municipal unit density: 7.244/km^{2} (18.76/sq mi)
  - Community: 49
- Time zone: UTC+2 (EET)
  - Summer (DST): UTC+3 (EEST)
- Postal code: 250 16
- Vehicle registration: AX

Aroania (Greek: Αροάνια) (also known as "Sopoto") is a village and a former municipality in Achaea, West Greece, Greece. Since the 2011 local government reform, it is part of the municipality Kalavryta, of which it is a municipal unit. The municipal unit has an area of 173.804 km^{2}. The seat of administration was in the town of Psofida. The municipality is named after the village and the mountain.

== Subdivisions ==
The municipal unit Aroania is subdivided into the following communities (constituent villages in brackets):

- Agrampela (Agrampela, Platanitsa)
- Agridi
- Alestaina
- Anastasi (Anastasi, Moni Agion Theodoron)
- Aroania
- Desino
- Kamenianoi (Kamenianoi, Drovolovo)
- Lechouri (Lechouri, Kerasea, Selli)
- Livartzi (Livartzi, Livadi, Livartzino)
- Plaka
- Psofida (Psofida, Ano Psofida, Ano Tripotama, Kato Tripotama, Tripotama, Vasiliki)
- Seires (Seires, Agioi Theodoroi, Agios Georgios, Krini, Thomaiika)

== Transportation ==
The historic EO111, which ran between Tripoli and Lygies (south of Patras) from 1928 to 1955, used to pass through Aroania, Agridi and Tripotama.

== Notable people ==
- Ioannis Sofianopoulos (1887–1951), politician

== Population ==
Year	Population
1991	2,315
2001	2,551
2011	1,619
2021	1,259
