= Psofida =

Psofida Ψωφίδα
- Community
- Location within Greece
- Coordinates: 37°52′N 21°54′E
- Country: Greece
- Administrative region: West Greece
- Regional unit: Achaea
- Municipality: Kalavryta
- Municipal unit: Aroania
- Elevation: 570 m (1,870 ft)

Population (2021)
  - Community: 274
- Time zone: UTC+2 (EET)
  - Summer (DST): UTC+3 (EEST)
- Postal code: 250 12
- Area code: 26920

Psofida (Greek: Ψωφίδα) is a village and a community in the municipal unit of Aroania in the southern part of Achaea, Greece. The community consists of the villages Psofida, Ano Psofida, Tripotama, Ano Tripotama, Kato Tripotama and Vasiliki. Psofida was named after the ancient Arcadian town Psophis, that was located near the present village Tripotama. It is situated near the confluence of the rivers Erymanthos, Aroanios and Seiraios, and near the tripoint of Achaea, Arcadia and Elis. It is 4 km southwest of Livartzi, 9 km east of Lampeia, 25 km southwest of Kalavryta and 45 km southeast of Patras.

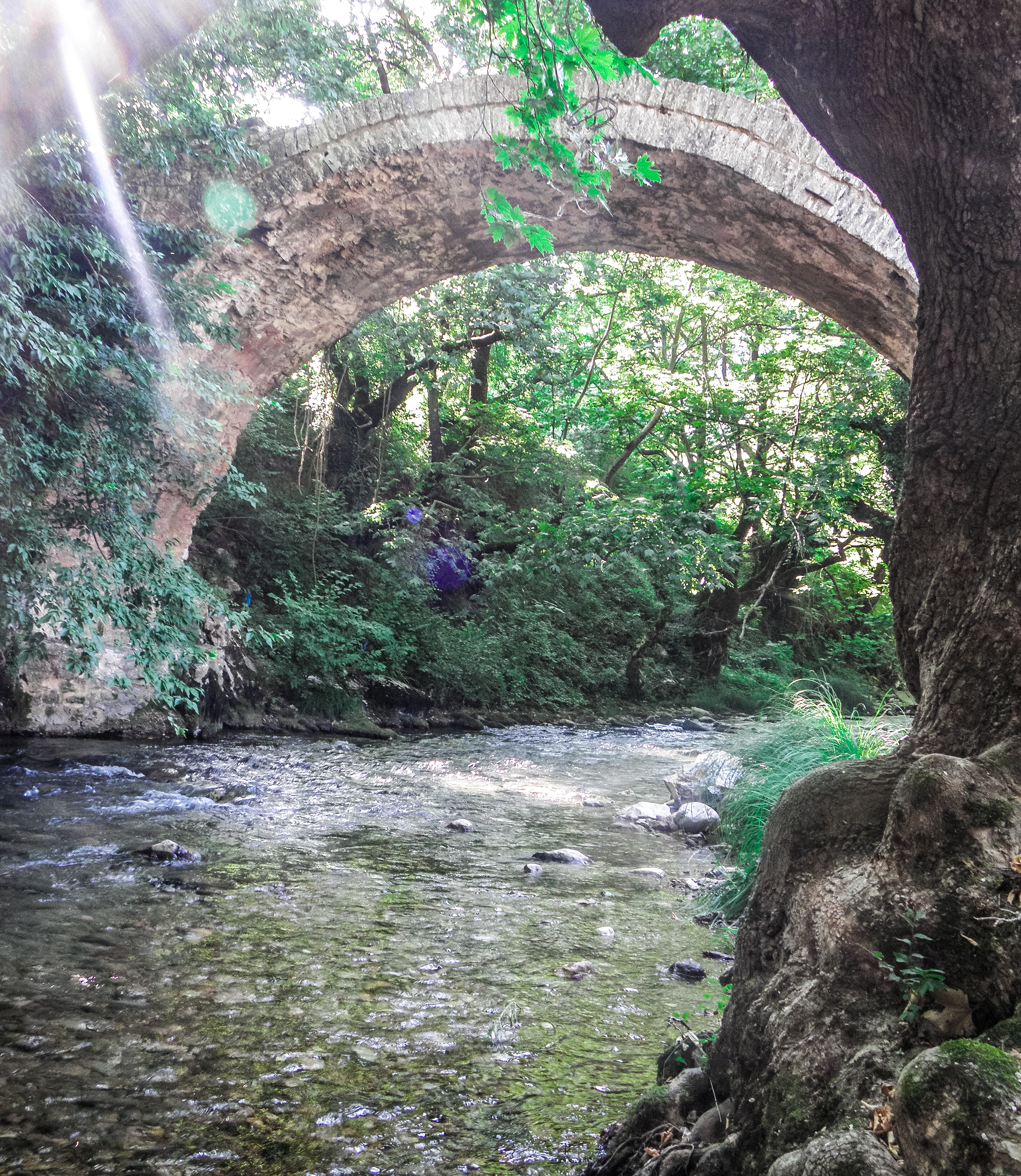
Erymanthos River and the old arched stone bridge in Tripotama village, Achaia-Ilia borders.

== Transport ==
The EO33 road, which runs between Patras and Levidi, passes through the village: the road is known locally as the EO111.

== Historical population ==
Year	Population
1981	434
2001	360
2011	279
2021	274

== See also ==
- List of settlements in Achaea
