= Agia Anna, Elis =

Agia Anna Αγία Άννα
- Community
- Location within Greece
- Coordinates: 37°46.6′N 21°38.2′E
- Country: Greece
- Administrative region: West Greece
- Regional unit: Elis
- Municipality: Pyrgos
- Municipal unit: Oleni
- Elevation: 450 m (1,480 ft)

Population (2021)
  - Community: 123
- Time zone: UTC+2 (EET)
  - Summer (DST): UTC+3 (EEST)
- Postal code: 270 63
- Vehicle registration: HA

Agia Anna (Greek: Αγία Άννα meaning Saint Anne) is a mountain village in the municipal unit of Oleni, Elis, Greece. Agia Anna is built on the slopes of the hill Axofolia, a western spur of the Foloi plateau. In the village square, the elevation is 450 m, and the top of the hill is around 670 m. Agia Anna is 2 km northeast of Goumero, 4 km west of Klindia, 10 km southeast of Simopoulo and 10 km northeast of Karatoula. The area is forested, but suffered damage from the 2007 Greek forest fires.

== Population ==
Year	Population
1991	279
2001	413
2011	168
2021	123

== History ==
The village Agia Anna was founded in a remote place during Ottoman rule, to hide from the Turks. The village is named after its church. Between 1841 and 1912, the community was part of the old municipality of Lampeia. It was an independent community until 1997, when it became part of the municipality of Oleni under the Kapodistrias reform.

== See also ==
- List of settlements in Elis
