= Astras =

Astras Αστράς
- Community
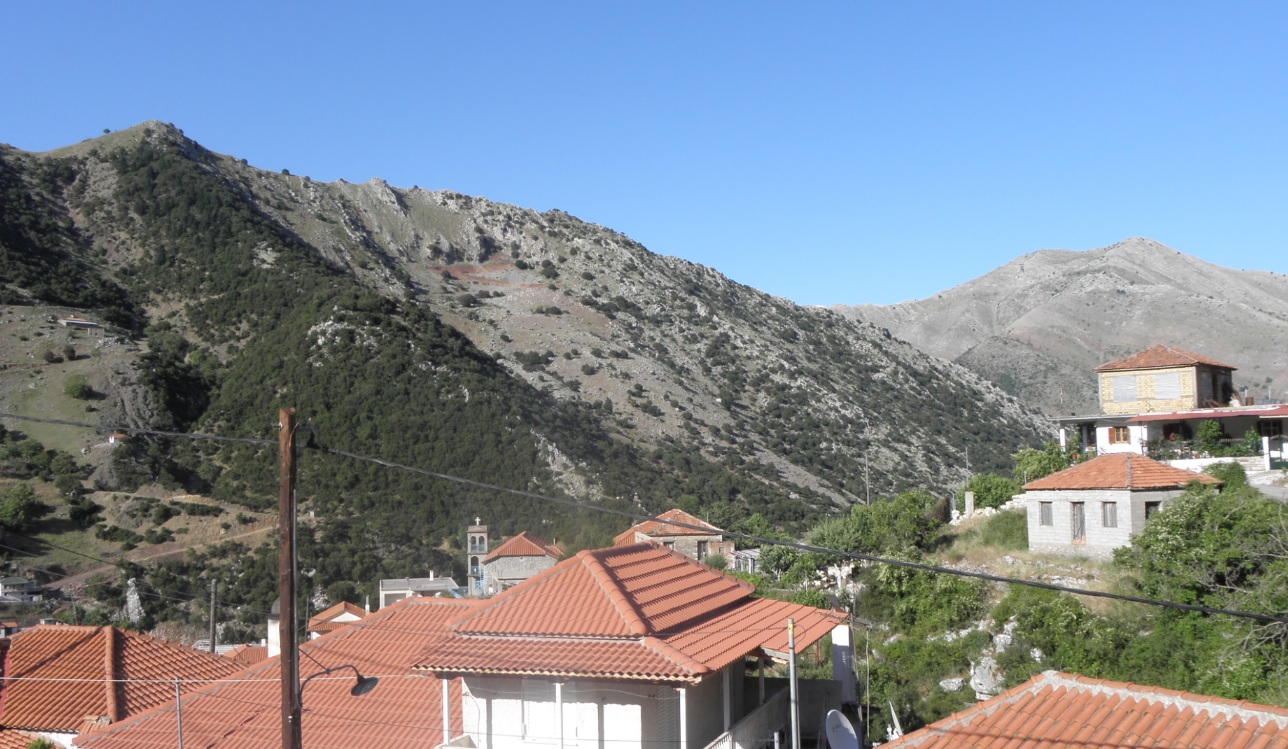

- Location within Greece
- Coordinates: 37°54′N 21°50′E
- Country: Greece
- Administrative region: West Greece
- Regional unit: Elis
- Municipality: Archaia Olympia
- Municipal unit: Lampeia

Population (2021)
  - Community: 182
- Time zone: UTC+2 (EET)
  - Summer (DST): UTC+3 (EEST)

Astras (Greek: Αστράς) is a mountain village of the Elis region in West Greece. A formerly independent community, it became part of the municipality of Lampeia as a result of the 1997 Kapodistrias reform. At the 2011 Kallikratis reform, Lampeia became a municipal unit of the municipality of Ancient Olympia. Towards the lower end of the village lies a settlement named Kaluvia of Astras. A mountain road goes through a forest which connects Astras to the village of Lampeia (formerly Divri).

== Demographics ==
As of the 2011 census, Astras had a population of 132 as compared to the 2001 census population of 143 inhabitants (0.80% decrease).

The first recorded census was conducted in 1700 by Francisco Grimani from Venice. The village had 174 inhabitants (92 men and 82 women) and 34 families at that time.

== History ==
The region of Astras has been inhabited since ancient times (now known as Nousa), a few kilometers from Tripotama. The nearby ancient city of Psophis is mentioned in Iliad. In ancient times, Astras was a part of Psophis, as indicated by sculptures and other things of daily use in the neighborhood of Kaluvia of Astras. Proper Astras history begins during the Byzantine empire. A significant town event was in the Proto-Byzantine years, when Alaric the Great destroyed Ancient Psophis in 398 AD. Historian Zosimus wrote about the area 50 years after the destruction of Psophis. He mentioned that only a few citizens returned to the destroyed city. The most significant fact about the village is the “Asketerion of Nousa”. After the fall of the Byzantines, the village became part of the Republic of Venice. Nousa belonged to Kalavryta when Grimani's census took place, finding 174 inhabitants. During the Ottoman Occupation, the villagers suffered from Ottoman rule and especially from the city of Bay of Lala. Thus the Nousaites became klephts, who spent their lives in the mountains seeking freedom. Many heroes of the Greek revolution were from Nousa. According to the National Library of Greece, Nousa's freedom fighters included Nikolaos Koulis, Chrysanthos Koulis, Demetrius Karachioutis, Konstantinos Stathopoulos, Vasileios Makris, Aggellis Makris, and Panagiotes Makris (Makropanagos). The last was a relative of the famous Giannias who became the terror of the Turkalbanians in the region containing villages of Patrai. After liberation Nousa became part of the Municipality of Lampeia.

== Present ==
The village retains the traditional character of the whole region. Annual festivities honour Saint George, who is considered to be the village's protector. The majority of the villagers are involved in agriculture. In summer, the village attracts tourists. The river of Erymanthos that passes through the town is where Hercules is said to have captured the Erymanthian boar.

== Asketerion ==
The Asketerion of Astras is a two-story building built inside mountain. To the left of the entrance, a ladder made of rock leads to the upper floor that hosts a small chapel with an image of Virgin Mary (Platytera). Near the Asketerion are the ruins of the church of Saint John. The Asketerion was made by Osios Meletios in the 9th century, who established many monasteries there and in neighboring regions.

== Astras Poem ==
In 1930 Theodoros Ksudis from Elia wrote a poem with the name Astras:

Greek:

Αστρά, περήφανε Αστρά,
βαθιά θεμελιωμένε,
που καμαρώνεις άσειστος,
ωραίε κι αγριεμένε,
Κρύβεις απέθαντες ψυχές
μέσ’ στα πυκνά σου ελάτια
και δείχνεσαι στον ουρανό
σαν ουρανός με μάτια...
Αστρά, περήφανε Αστρά,
νεανικέ Αστρά μου,
της νιότης είσαι η νιότη συ
και της χαράς χαρά μου.
Με ποια γαλήνια προσευχή
που δένεται η ψυχή μου
στην τρυφερή, ρεμβαστική
κι εκστατική στιγμή μου!
English:

Astras, proud Astras
Strongly established
You who stand steadily
Beautiful and wild

You hide immortal souls
In your deep forests
And you show yourself to the sky
Like a sky with eyes

Astras proud Astras
My young Astras
You are the youth of my youth
And the joy of my joy

With which relaxing prayer
My soul goes with
In my beautiful
Ecstatic moment of mine watching you
