= Agia Kyriaki, Elis =

Agia Kyriaki Αγία Κυριακή
- Community
- Location within Greece
- Coordinates: 37°51′N 21°46′E
- Country: Greece
- Administrative region: West Greece
- Regional unit: Elis
- Municipality: Archaia Olympia
- Municipal unit: Lasiona

Population (2021)
  - Community: 77
- Time zone: UTC+2 (EET)
  - Summer (DST): UTC+3 (EEST)

Agia Kyriaki (Greek: Αγία Κυριακή, Agía Kyriakí; before 1955: Kertiza (Greek: Κέρτιζα, Kértiza)) is a mountain village in the municipal unit of Lasiona, Olympia, Elis, Greece. It is situated in the southwestern foothills of Mount Erymanthos at 940 metres elevation, 4 km west of Lampeia, 7 km northeast of Antroni and 26 km northeast of Olympia.

== Population ==
Year	Population
1981	193
1991	128
2001	121
2011	78
2021	77

== See also ==
- List of settlements in Elis
