= Goumero =

Goumero Γούμερο
- Community
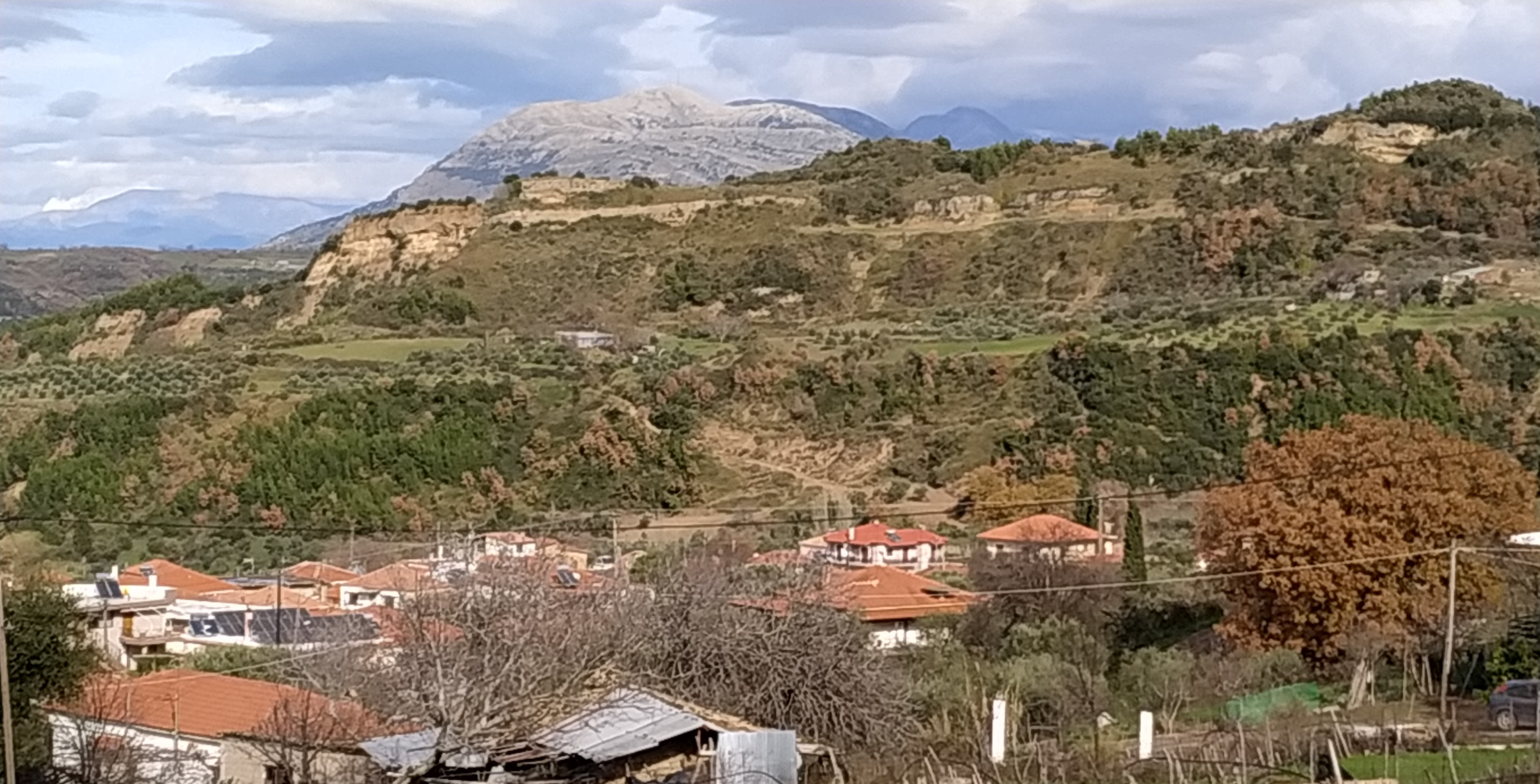

- Location within Greece
- Coordinates: 37°46′N 21°37′E
- Country: Greece
- Administrative region: West Greece
- Regional unit: Elis
- Municipality: Pyrgos
- Municipal unit: Oleni

Population (2021)
  - Community: 588
- Time zone: UTC+2 (EET)
  - Summer (DST): UTC+3 (EEST)
- Vehicle registration: HA
- Website: http://www.goumero.gr

Goumero (Greek: Γούμερο) is a village in the municipal unit of Oleni, Elis, Greece. It is situated on a hillside in the western foothills of the Foloi plateau, at 500 m elevation. It is 2 km southwest of Agia Anna, 5 km northwest of Neraida, 8 km northeast of Karatoula and 13 km north of Olympia.

== Population ==
Year	Population
1981	947
1991	1,032
2001	1,059
2011	642
2021	588

== History ==
Goumero is built in the area where the Ancient town Alesyon (Αλήσυον) or Alesaion (Αλησαίον), mentioned by Strabo, was located. The village was first mentioned as Vumero in the 14th century.

== See also ==
- List of settlements in Elis
