= Giorgos Giannias =

Greek revolutionary leader

Giorgos Giannias Γιώργος Γιαννιάς
- Born: Prostovitsa (now Drosia, Achaia, Greece)
- Died: June 13, 1821; Koumani, (now in Elis, Greece)
- Occupation: Greek Revolutionary Leader

Giorgos Giannias (Greek: Γιώργος Γιαννιάς, d. June 13, 1821 near Koumani) was a Greek revolutionary leader born in Prostovitsa, a village now known as Drosia in Achaia. He was the brother of Konstantinos Giannias.

In March 1821, he entered as one of the first in the revolution with a small strategic army. He gave all the battles and mainly the Turks from Lalas. On March 27, he battled with 1,500 Turks in the Katsaros narrows in which 120 Turks died. Many folk music brought into his heroic battle. Next to the location in which the battle of Antroni (Spartoulia - Σπαρτουλιά) in which had a memory in honor of him.

On June 13, all the Greek were in Lala by the boundary with Ilia, he held the vanguard of the Greek battlefield. In one view of the Lalians in Koumani brought in 100 man in front of a large spot of the Turks, many commanders fled the area. It remained 8 men and worsely battled, after the end, they battled until all of them fell.
