= Dimosthenis Dogkas =

Greek politician

Dimosthenis Dogkas Δημοσθένης Δόγκας
- Born: 19th century Latzoi, Pyrgos, Elis, Greece
- Died: October 25, 1902; Krekouki, Elis, Greece
- Occupations: politician, Mayors of Olenas and Olympia

Dimosthenis Dogkas (Greek: Δημοσθένης Δόγκας, died October 25, 1905) was a Greek politician from Elis. He was born in Latzoi (Λατζόι; now part of Pyrgos municipality) near Karatoula and was descended from a political family. His father was a mayor of the municipality of Oleni and his sister was the wife of Sotirios Krekoukiotis.

He was elected mayor of Oleni in 1875, Olympia in 1881 and again for Oleni in 1887. He was elected for the Greek parliament as a representative of Elis for the first time in 1881, and was re-elected in 1895 and 1902. He supported the Trikoupis government. He died on October 25, 1905, in Krekouki.
