= Oreini =

Oreini may refer to:

- Oreini, Ilia, or Mostenitsa, a village in southern Greece
- Oreini, Serres, a community in northern Greece
