= Kalfas =

Community in Erymanthos, Achaea, Greece

Kalfas Κάλφας
- Community
- Location within Greece
- Coordinates: 37°54′N 21°36′E
- Country: Greece
- Administrative region: West Greece
- Regional unit: Achaea
- Municipality: Erymanthos
- Municipal unit: Tritaia

Population (2021)
  - Community: 177
- Time zone: UTC+2 (EET)
  - Summer (DST): UTC+3 (EEST)

Kalfas (Greek: Κάλφας) is a village and a community in the municipal unit of Tritaia, southern Achaea, Greece. It is located in a mountainous area, 5 km southeast of Portes and 7 km southwest of Stavrodromi. The community consists of the villages Kalfas and Masouraiika. It suffered damage from the 2007 Greek forest fires.

== General information ==
It is surrounded by mountains and hills full of pine trees and is located on the border between Achaea and Elis, about 45 km southwest of Patras. The inhabitants are mostly engaged in livestock husbandry and to a lesser extent in agriculture. In the village there are 2 to 3 cafes. A particular sight is the Chapel of the Prophet Elijah especially, especially during the feast of the Holy Spirit.

== Population ==
Year	Population	Community population
1981	-	315
1991	300	-
2001	273	322
2011	111	140
2021	148	177

== Photos ==
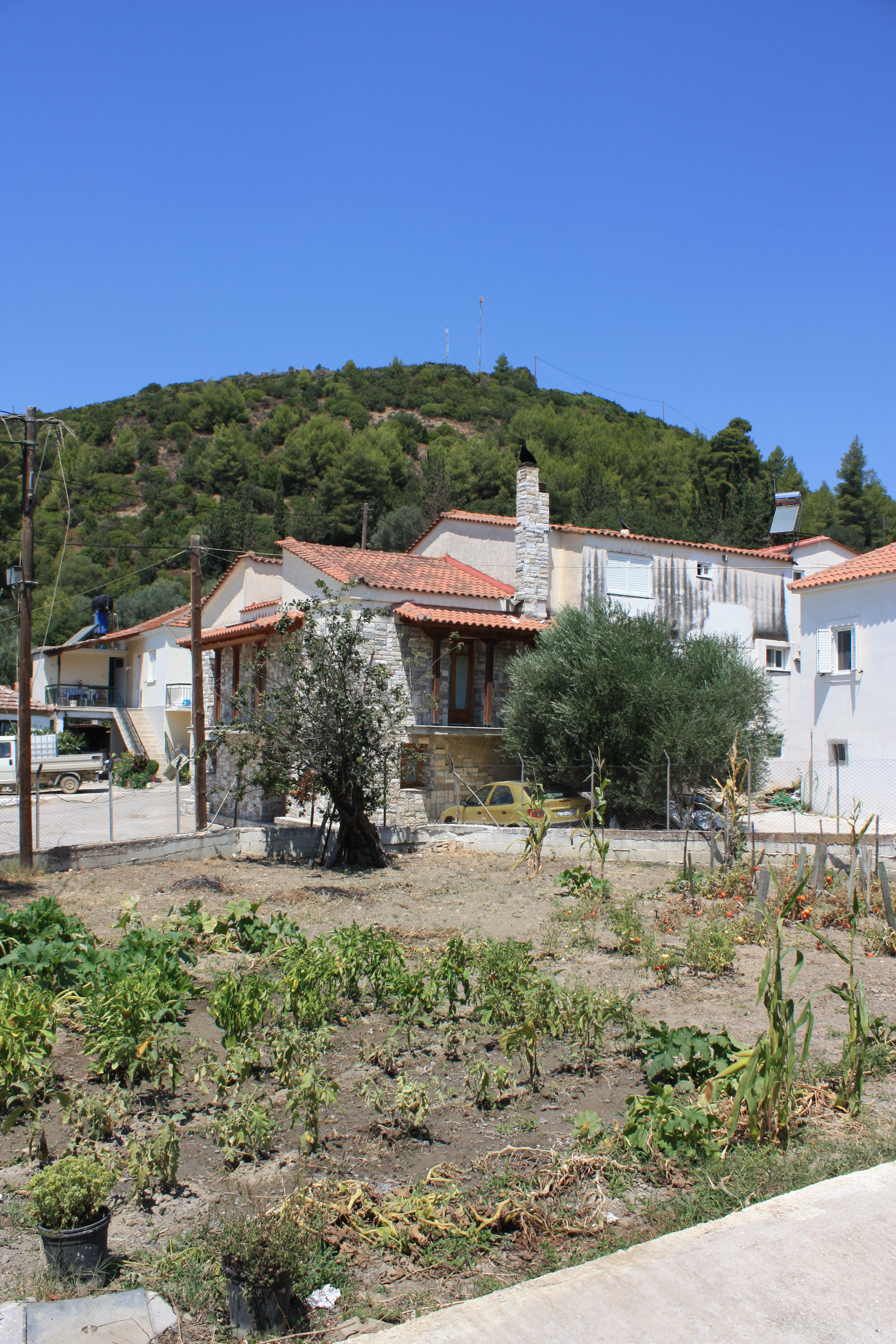
View of the village

== See also ==
- List of settlements in Achaea
