= Drosia, Achaea =

Community in Achaea, Greece

Drosia Δροσιά
- Community
- Location within Greece
- Coordinates: 37°55′N 21°45′E
- Country: Greece
- Administrative region: West Greece
- Regional unit: Achaea
- Municipality: Erymanthos
- Municipal unit: Tritaia
- Elevation: 650 m (2,130 ft)

Population (2021)
  - Community: 494
- Time zone: UTC+2 (EET)
  - Summer (DST): UTC+3 (EEST)
- Postal code: 251 00
- Vehicle registration: AX

Drosia (Greek: Δροσιά, before 1955: Προστοβίτσα - Prostovitsa) is a village and a community in southern Achaea, Greece. Drosia is located at the foot of the Erymanthos mountains, 6 km east of Stavrodromi, and 37 km south of Patras. The community includes the villages Kato Drosia, Koumperi and Pteri.

== Population ==
Year	Population village	Population community
1981	-	1,004
1991	210	673
2001	382	816
2011	186	383
2021	198	494

== History ==
The ancient city Eupagion (Ευπάγιον) was located in the area of present Drosia. The revolutionary leaders Konstantinos Giannias and Giorgos Giannias, who fought against the Ottoman Empire, were born in Drosia. Drosia became a part of the municipality of Erymanthia in 1836. It was part of the municipality of Tritaia between 1841 and 1912. It was an independent community between 1912 and 1998, and again part of Tritaia between 1998 and 2011. Since 2011, it is part of the municipality of Erymanthos.

== See also ==
- List of settlements in Achaea
