= Agia Kyriaki (disambiguation) =

Agia Kyriaki (Greek: Αγία Κυριακή, Agía Kyriakí) may refer to several places in Greece named after Saint Kyriaki:

- Agia Kyriaki, an island in the Dodecanese
- Agia Kyriaki, Elis, a village in the Elis regional unit, part of the municipal unit Lasiona
- Agia Kyriaki, Kastoria, a village in the Kastoria regional unit, part of the municipal unit Mesopotamia
- Agia Kyriaki, Kozani, a village in the Kozani regional unit, part of the municipal unit Velventos
- Agia Kyriaki, Magnesia, a village and small port in the municipal unit of Trikeri
- Agia Kyriaki, Thesprotia, a village in Thesprotia, part of the municipal unit Paramythia
- Agia Kyriaki, Trikala, a village in the Trikala regional unit, part of the municipal unit Megala Kalyvia

== See also ==
- Kyriaki, a village in Boeotia
