= Mouzaki (disambiguation) =

Mouzaki (Greek: Μουζάκι) may refer to several places in Greece:

- Mouzaki, a town and a municipality in the Karditsa regional unit
- Mouzaki, Elis, a village in the municipal unit of Oleni, Elis

== See also ==
- Steve Mouzakis
