= Koumanis =

Koumanis Κούμανης
- Community
- Location within Greece
- Coordinates: 37°47′N 21°45′E
- Country: Greece
- Administrative region: West Greece
- Regional unit: Elis
- Municipality: Archaia Olympia
- Municipal unit: Foloi
- Elevation: 650 m (2,130 ft)

Population (2021)
  - Community: 529
- Time zone: UTC+2 (EET)
  - Summer (DST): UTC+3 (EEST)

Koumanis (Greek: Κούμανης, also Κούμανι - Koumani) is a mountain village and a community in the municipal unit of Foloi, Elis, Greece. The community includes the small villages Ai Giannakis and Kastania. Koumanis is located at 650 m above sea level, at the northern edge of the Foloi oak forest. The small rivers Gkoura and Koumaneiko form deep ravines near Koumanis. Its climate is cool during the summer and wet during the winter. Koumanis is 3 km east of the village Foloi, 3 km southeast of Antroni, 9 km southwest of Lampeia and 20 km northeast of Olympia. The inhabitants of Koumanis and the neighbouring village Antroni were known for their bravery during the Greek War of Independence.

== Population ==
Year	Village population	Community population
1981	749	-
1991	707	-
2001	719	779
2011	498	506
2021	518	529

== See also ==
- List of settlements in Elis
