= Tritaia =

Municipal unit of Erymanthos, Achaea, Greece

Tritaia Τριταία
- Municipal unit
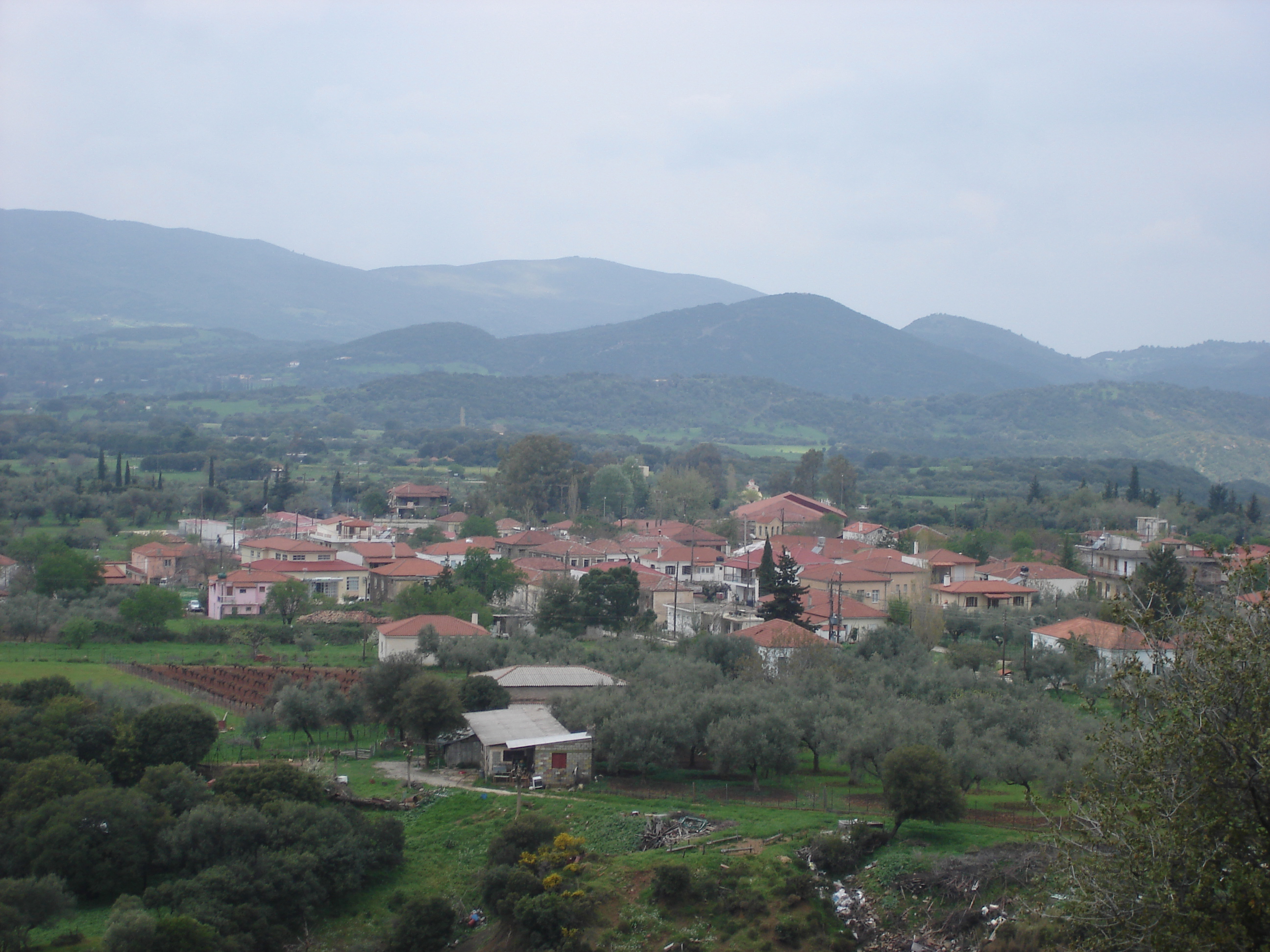
- Erymantheia, a village of Tritaia

- Location within the regional unit

- Location within Greece
- Coordinates: 37°56′N 21°40′E
- Country: Greece
- Administrative region: West Greece
- Regional unit: Achaea
- Municipality: Erymanthos

Area
  - Municipal unit: 244.798 km^{2} (94.517 sq mi)
- Elevation: 401 m (1,316 ft)

Population (2021)
  - Municipal unit: 3,056
  - Municipal unit density: 12.48/km^{2} (32.33/sq mi)
- Time zone: UTC+2 (EET)
  - Summer (DST): UTC+3 (EEST)
- Postal code: 250 15
- Area code: 26940
- Vehicle registration: AX
- Website: www.tritaia.gr

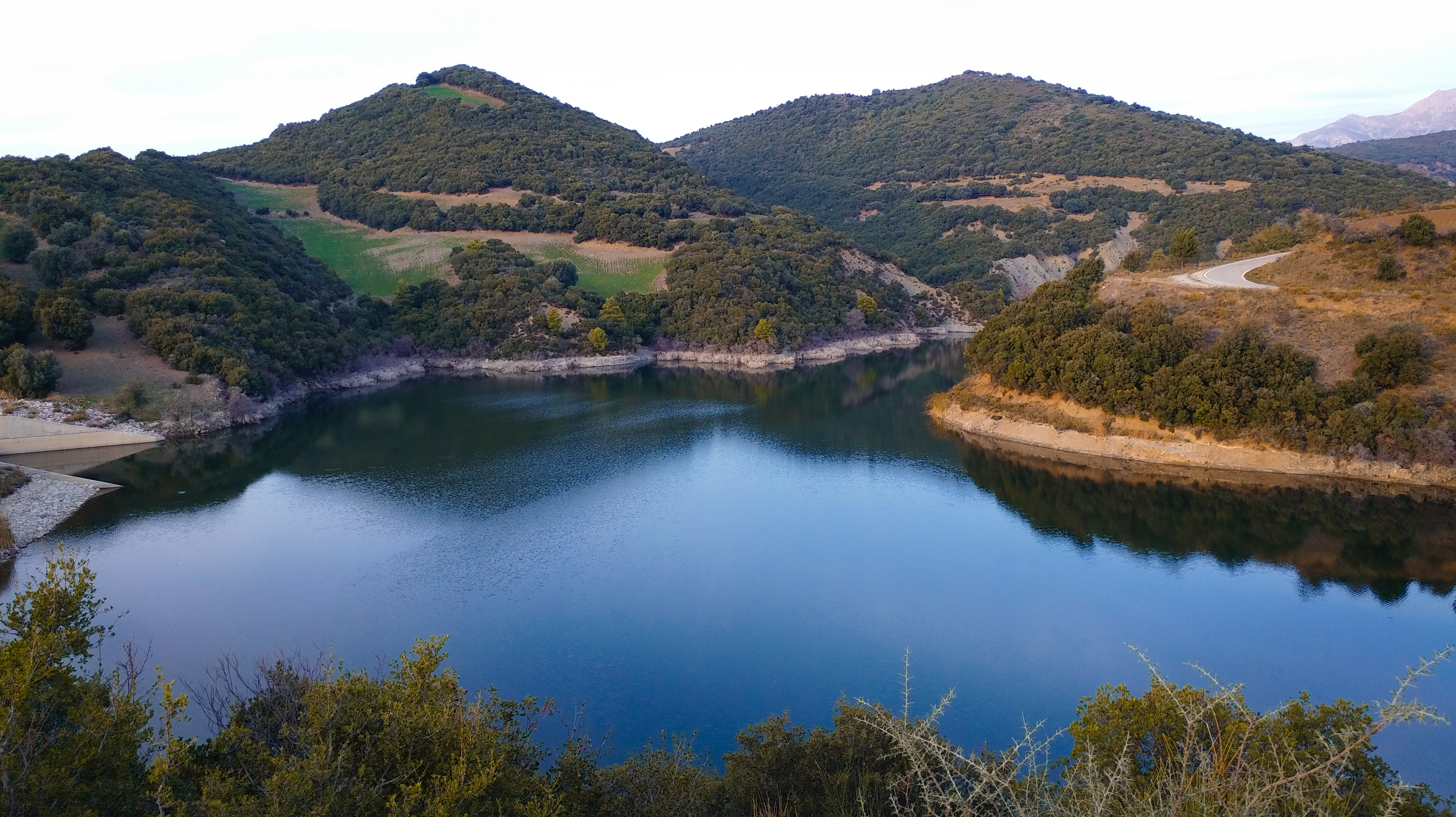
View of Ntaska Reservoir near Velimachi village, Tritaia region, Achaia, Greece.

Tritaia (Greek: Τριταία) is a former municipality in Achaea, West Greece, Greece. Since the 2011 local government reform it is part of the municipality Erymanthos, of which it is a municipal unit. The municipal unit has an area of 244.798 km^{2}. The seat of the municipality was in Stavrodromi. Tritaia was named after the ancient Achaean city Tritaea, which was located near the present village Agia Marina. Tritaia is situated in mountainous southern Achaea, on the border with Elis. It nearly surrounds the municipal unit Kalentzi. Mount Erymanthos is located in the eastern part of Tritaia. The Greek National Road 33 (Patras - Tripoli) runs through Tritaia.

== Subdivisions ==
The municipal unit Tritaia is subdivided into the following communities (constituent villages in brackets):

- Agia Varvara (Agia Varvara, Galaros)
- Agia Marina (Agia Marina, Kato Agia Marina)
- Al(e)pochori (Alpochori, Agios Dimitrios)
- Chiona
- Drosia (Drosia, Kato Drosia, Koumperi, Pteri)
- Erymantheia
- Kalfas (Kalfas, Masouraiika)
- Manesi Patron (Manesi, Golemi, Kato Mastrantoni, Mastrantonis)
- Roupakia
- Skiadas (Skiadas, Barakes, Karpeta, Pigadia)
- Skouras (Skouras, Kardasi)
- Spartia (Spartia, Kyparissi)
- Stavrodromi (Stavrodromi, Panousaiika, Rachi, Xirochori)
- Velimachi

== Population ==
Year	Population
1991	5,051
2001	5,462
2011	3,086
2021	3,056

== History ==
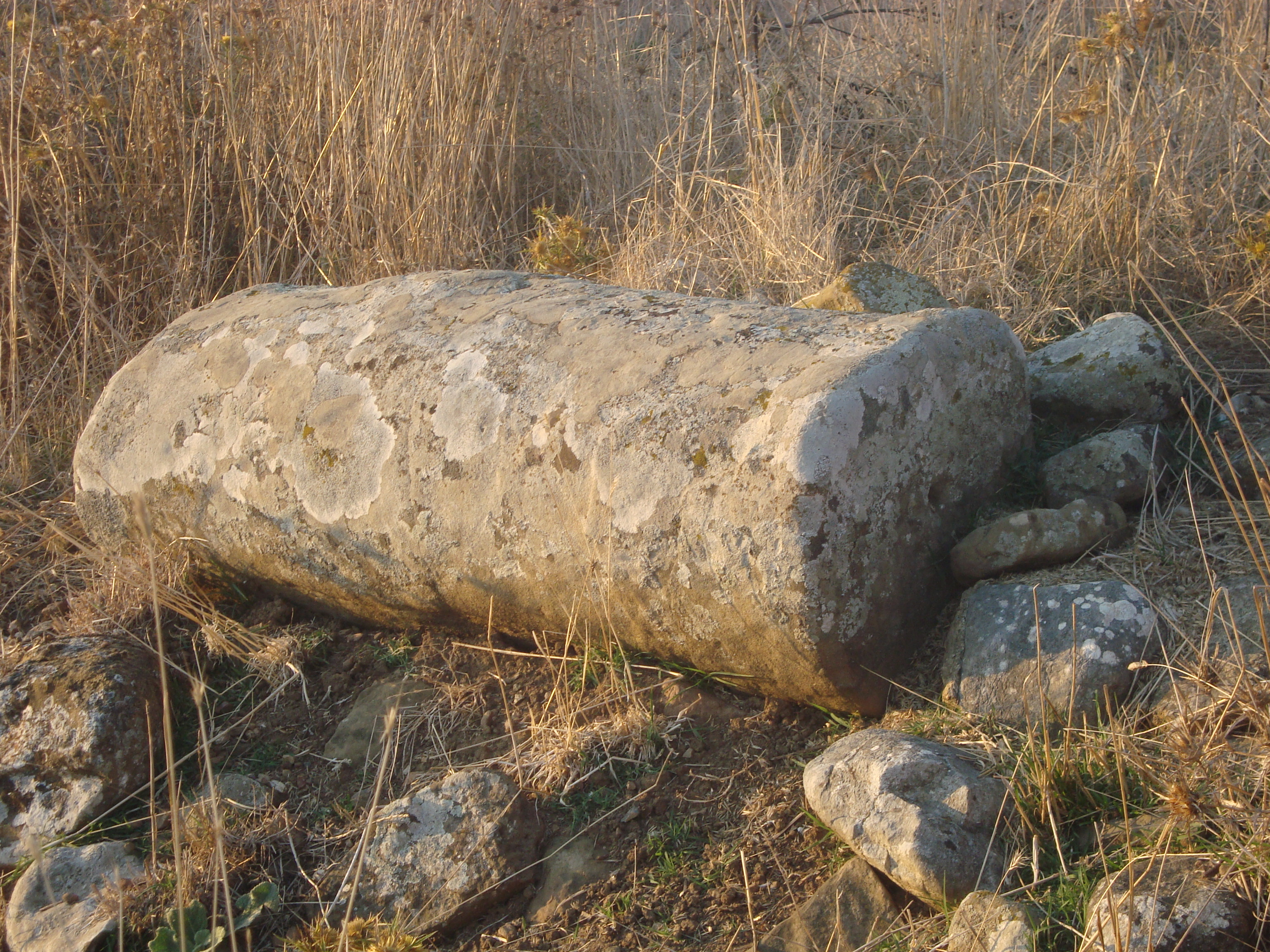
Ancient Triteia

According to Greek mythology, the city Triteia was founded by Melanippus, son of Ares and Triteia, daughter of the sea-god Triton. It was one of the twelve cities of the ancient Achaeans. The remains of Triteia have been discovered near the village Agia Marina.

The name was reused for the municipality Tritaia that was created in 1835, which covered parts of the present municipal units Tritaia and Olenia. It was dissolved in 1912 and recreated in 1998 under the Capodistrian Plan. In 2011 Tritaia became part of the new municipality Erymanthos.

== Sports ==
The football clubs AO Tritaikos and Thyella Skiada both play on the dry field in Stavrodromi.

== See also ==
- List of settlements in Achaea
