= Charia =

Charia Χαριά
- Community
- Location within Greece
- Coordinates: 37°44′N 21°31′E
- Country: Greece
- Administrative region: West Greece
- Regional unit: Elis
- Municipality: Pyrgos
- Municipal unit: Oleni
- Elevation: 80 m (260 ft)

Population (2021)
  - Community: 125
- Time zone: UTC+2 (EET)
  - Summer (DST): UTC+3 (EEST)
- Postal code: 27064

Charia (Greek: Χαριά) is a village and a community in the municipal unit of Oleni, Elis, Greece. It is situated in a valley between low hills, at 80 m elevation. It is 2 km west of Karatoula, 4 km east of Ampelonas, and 9 km northeast of Pyrgos.

== See also ==
- List of settlements in Elis
