= The Daughter (novel) =

1990 novel by Pavlos Matesis

- First edition (Greek)
- Author: Pavlos Matesis
- Original title: Η μητερα του σκυλου
- Translator: Fred A. Reed
- Language: English
- Publisher: Arcadia Books (London)
- Publication date: 1990
- English publication date: 1 July 2002
- Pages: 224 pp
- ISBN: 1-900850-71-0

The Daughter is a novel by Pavlos Matesis, published in Greece in 1990, translated to English in 2002. It takes in the events of the Second World War from the perspective of a young Greek girl. It is an international bestseller in nine languages and has sold over 150,000 copies in Greece alone.
