= The Translation of Ancient Greek Drama in All the Languages of the World =

1998 book

- Author: Giorgos Aggelinaras, P. Mavromoustakou, Christina Symvoulidou, Walter Puchner, Nikos Chourmouziadēs, A. Feldhuns, G. Giannaris, Pavlos Matesis, E. Chandriotis, Jerzy Łanowski, F.R. de Oliveira and K. Georgosopoulos.
- Language: Modern Greek
- Published: 1998 (Center for Research and Practical Applications of Ancient Greek Drama "Desmoi") (Greek)
- Publication place: Greece
- ISBN: 9789608623606

The Translation of Ancient Greek Drama in All the Languages of the World (Greek: Η Μετάφραση του Αρχαίου Ελληνικού Δράματος σε Όλες τις Γλώσσες του Κόσμου) is a collection of lectures and essays on the translation of Ancient Greek drama, edited by Helena Patrikiou and published in 1998. The book includes work presented in October 1995 as part of a convention on the translation of Greek drama, in which nearly 40 scholars and translators participated.

== Authors and essayists ==
The compilation features lectures and essays by Giorgos Aggelinaras, P. Mavromoustakou, Christina Symvoulidou, Walter Puchner, Nikos Chourmouziadēs, A. Feldhuns, G. Giannaris, Pavlos Matesis, E. Chandriotis, Jerzy Łanowski, F.R. de Oliveira and K. Georgosopoulos.
