= Pavlos Matesis =

- Born: 12 January 1933; Divri, Greece
- Died: 20 January 2013; Athens, Greece
- Occupation: writer
- Writing career
- Language: Greek
- Years active: 1963–2013
- Genre: Drama
- Notable work: The Ceremony

Pavlos Matesis (12 January 1933 – 20 January 2013) was a Greek novelist, playwright and translator. He was born in Divri, a village in the Peloponnese and had a peripatetic youth. He studied acting, music and languages, and taught drama at the Stavrakou School in Athens (1963–64). He also worked as a writer at the National Theatre during 1971–73. He wrote scripts for two television series broadcast on the state channel (1974–76).

His debut play The Ceremony was staged in 1967 and revived at the National Theatre in 1969. He wrote more than a dozen plays, most of which were performed at the National Theatre. He won several awards for his plays and for his fiction. As a translator, he translated the works of Ben Jonson, William Shakespeare, Harold Pinter, Fernando Arrabal, Antonin Artaud, Beaumarchais and William Faulkner. His own work has been translated into numerous European languages. His novel The Daughter was published in English to critical acclaim.

He died in 2013.

== Books ==
- The Translation of Ancient Greek Drama in All the Languages of the World (1998)
- Contemporary Greek Theatre (2001)
- The Daughter (2002)

== Awards ==
- 1966 State Theatre Award for The Ceremony
- 2002 Grand Critics' Theatre Prize
- 2002 Giuseppe Acerbi Literary Prize for the novel The Dog's Mother
