= Lasiona, Elis =

Lasiona Λασιώνα
- Municipal unit
- Location within the regional unit

- Location within Greece
- Coordinates: 37°49′N 21°41′E
- Country: Greece
- Administrative region: West Greece
- Regional unit: Elis
- Municipality: Archaia Olympia

Area
  - Municipal unit: 119.5 km^{2} (46.1 sq mi)
- Elevation: 580 m (1,900 ft)

Population (2021)
  - Municipal unit: 1,336
  - Municipal unit density: 11.18/km^{2} (28.96/sq mi)
- Time zone: UTC+2 (EET)
  - Summer (DST): UTC+3 (EEST)
- Vehicle registration: ΗΑ

Lasiona (Greek: Λασιώνα) is a former municipality in Elis, West Greece, Greece. Since the 2011 local government reform it is part of the municipality Archaia Olympia, of which it is a municipal unit. The municipal unit has an area of 119.528 km^{2}. Its seat of administration was the village Antroni. Lasiona is situated in a mountainous area on the border with Achaea, 20 km north of Olympia, 27 km northeast of Pyrgos and 50 km south of Patras. The Greek National Road 33 (Patras - Tripoli) passes through the municipal unit.

== Historical population ==
Year	Population
1991	2,127
2001	1,915
2011	1,312
2021	1,336

== See also ==
- List of settlements in Elis
