= Lalzi Bay =

Albanian bay of the Adriatic Sea

- Gjiri i Lalzit
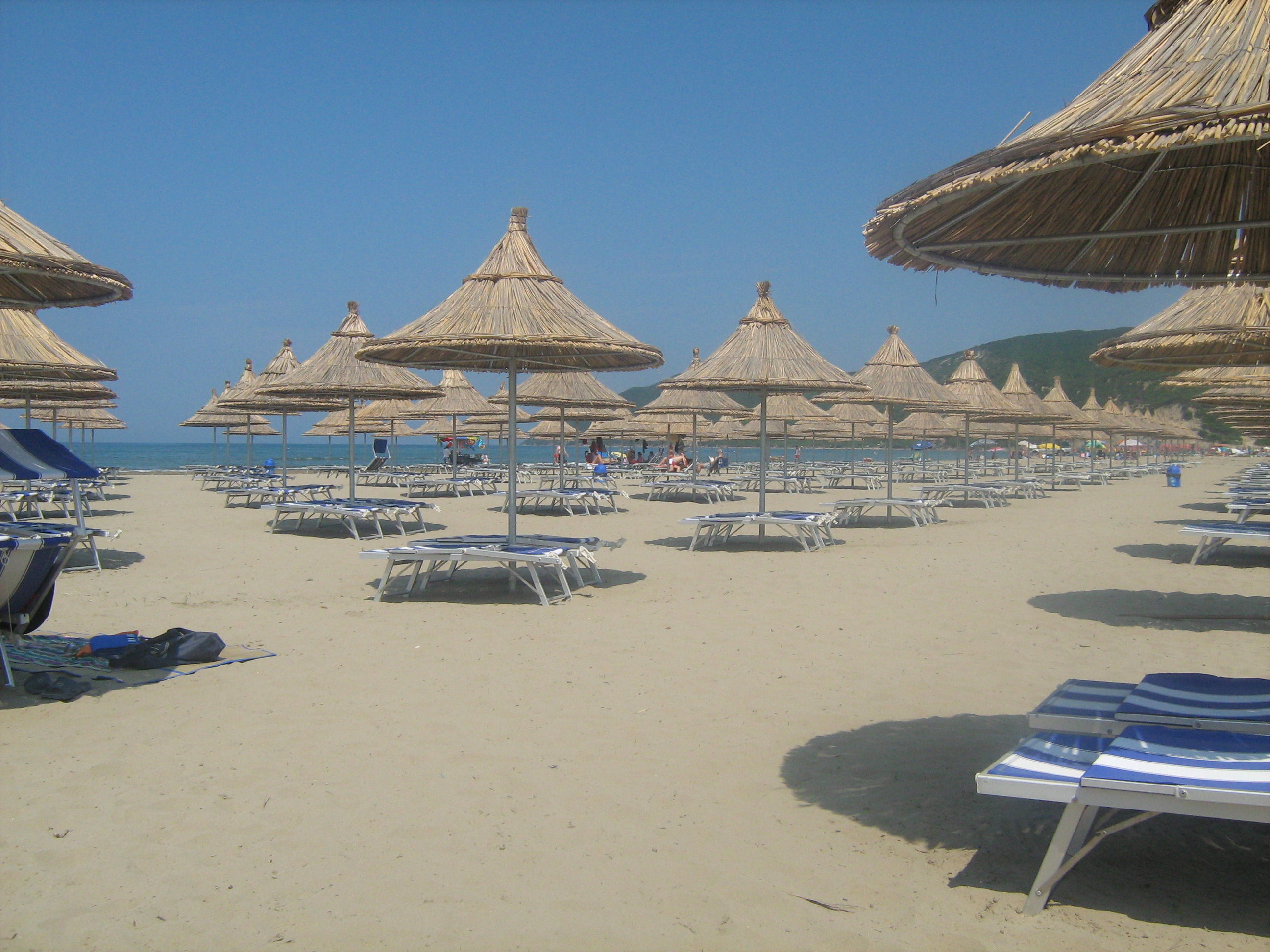
- Beach in Lalzi Bay

- Location within Albania
- Location: Southern Europe
- Coordinates: 41°28′38″N 19°30′32″E
- Ocean/sea sources: Adriatic Sea Mediterranean Sea
- Basin countries: Albania
- Max. length: 18 km (11 mi)
- Settlements: Durrës, Lezhë

Lalzi Bay (Albanian: Gjiri i Lalzit — Albanian pronunciation: [ˈɟiːɾi i ˈlalːzit], also Albanian: Gjiri i Shën Pjetrit) is a large bay of the Adriatic Sea within the Mediterranean Sea in Southern Europe.

== See also ==
- Biodiversity of Albania
- Geography of Albania
- Protected areas of Albania
