= Lampeia =

Lampeia Λάμπεια
- Municipal unit
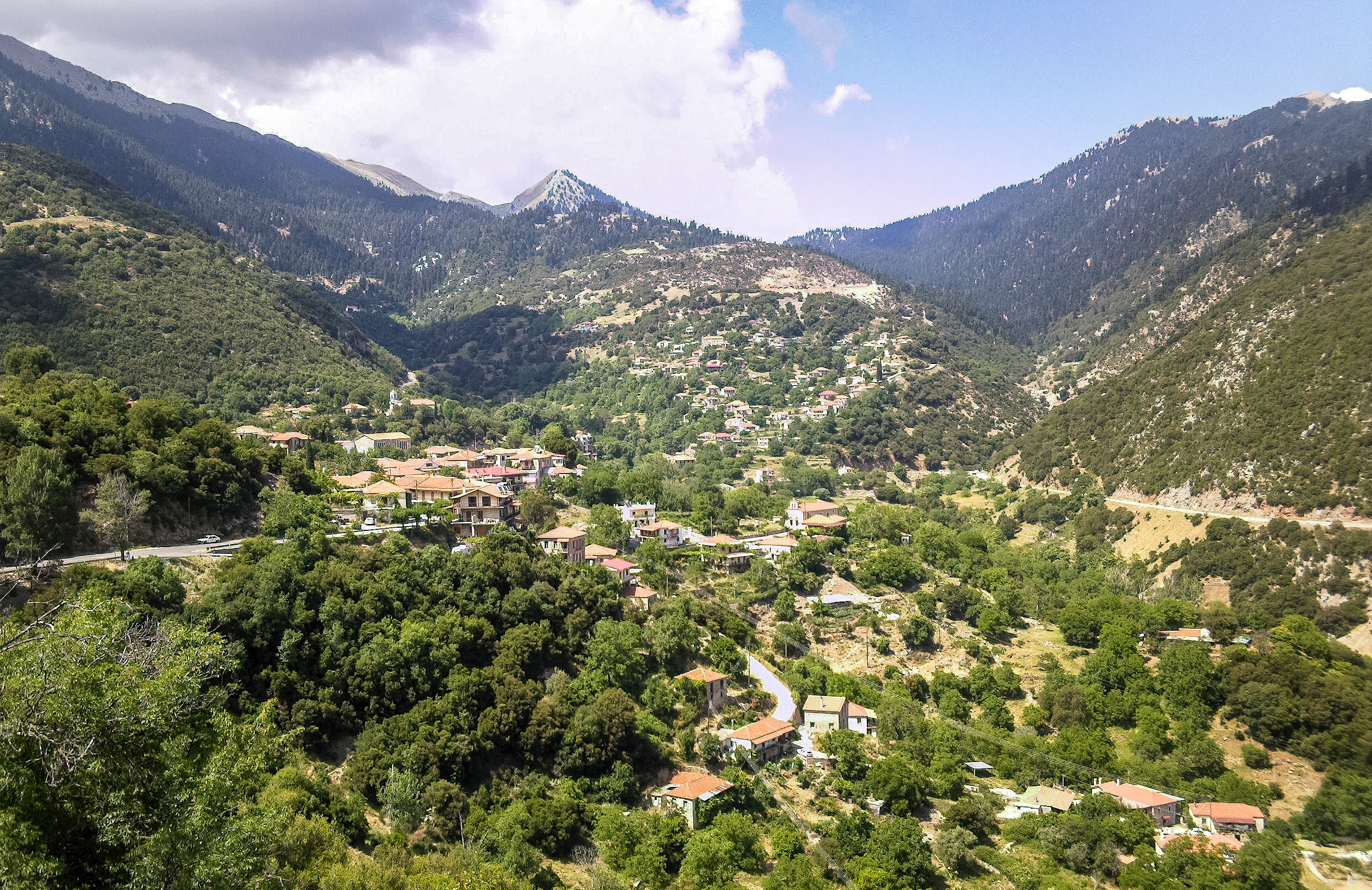

- Location within the regional unit

- Location within Greece
- Coordinates: 37°51′N 21°48′E
- Country: Greece
- Administrative region: West Greece
- Regional unit: Elis
- Municipality: Archaia Olympia

Area
  - Municipal unit: 72.4 km^{2} (28.0 sq mi)
- Elevation: 803 m (2,635 ft)

Population (2021)
  - Municipal unit: 665
  - Municipal unit density: 9.19/km^{2} (23.8/sq mi)
  - Community: 393
- Time zone: UTC+2 (EET)
  - Summer (DST): UTC+3 (EEST)
- Postal code: 270 63
- Area code: 26240
- Vehicle registration: ΗΑ

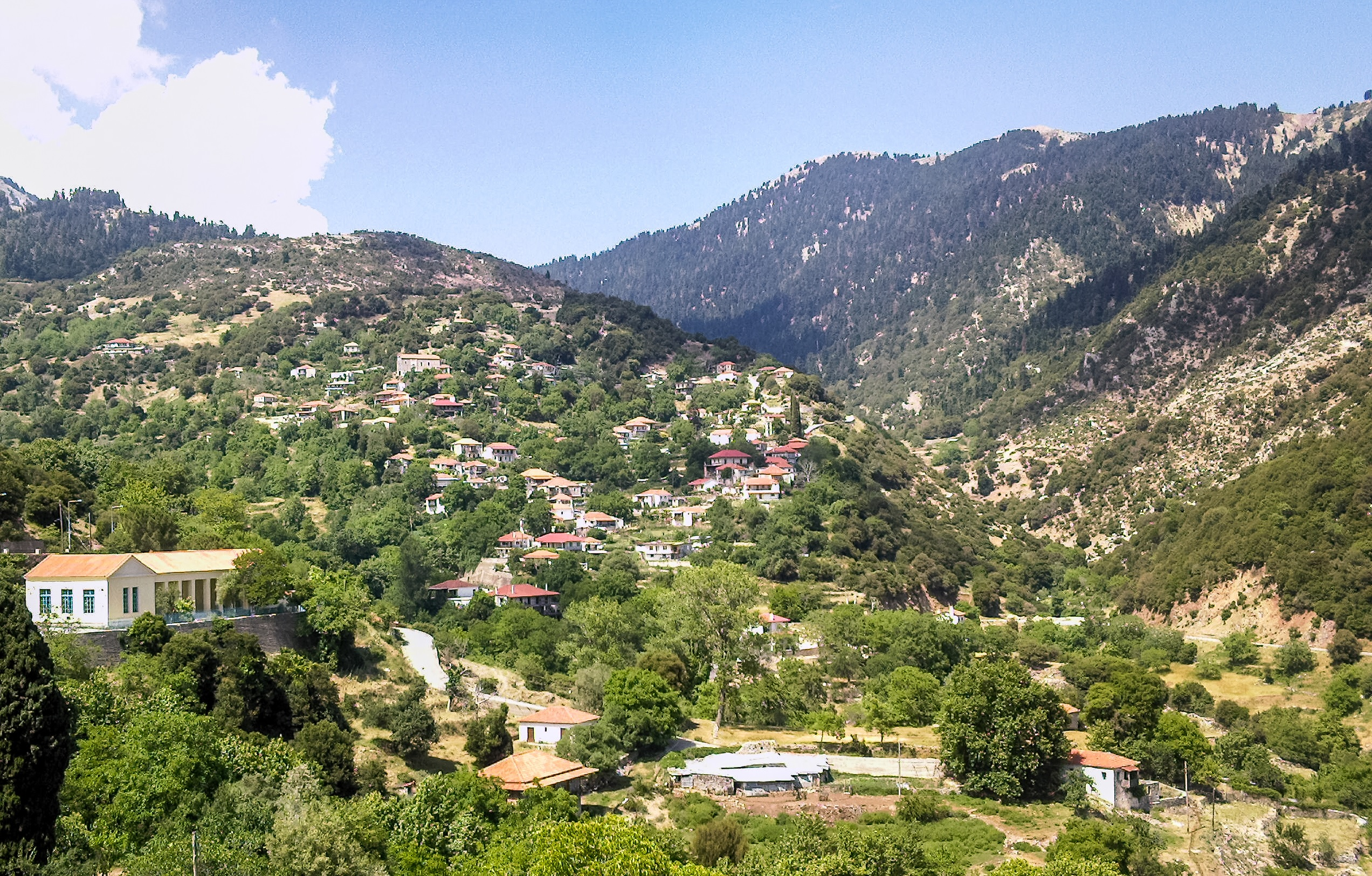
Lampeia (Divri) village, partial view of village.

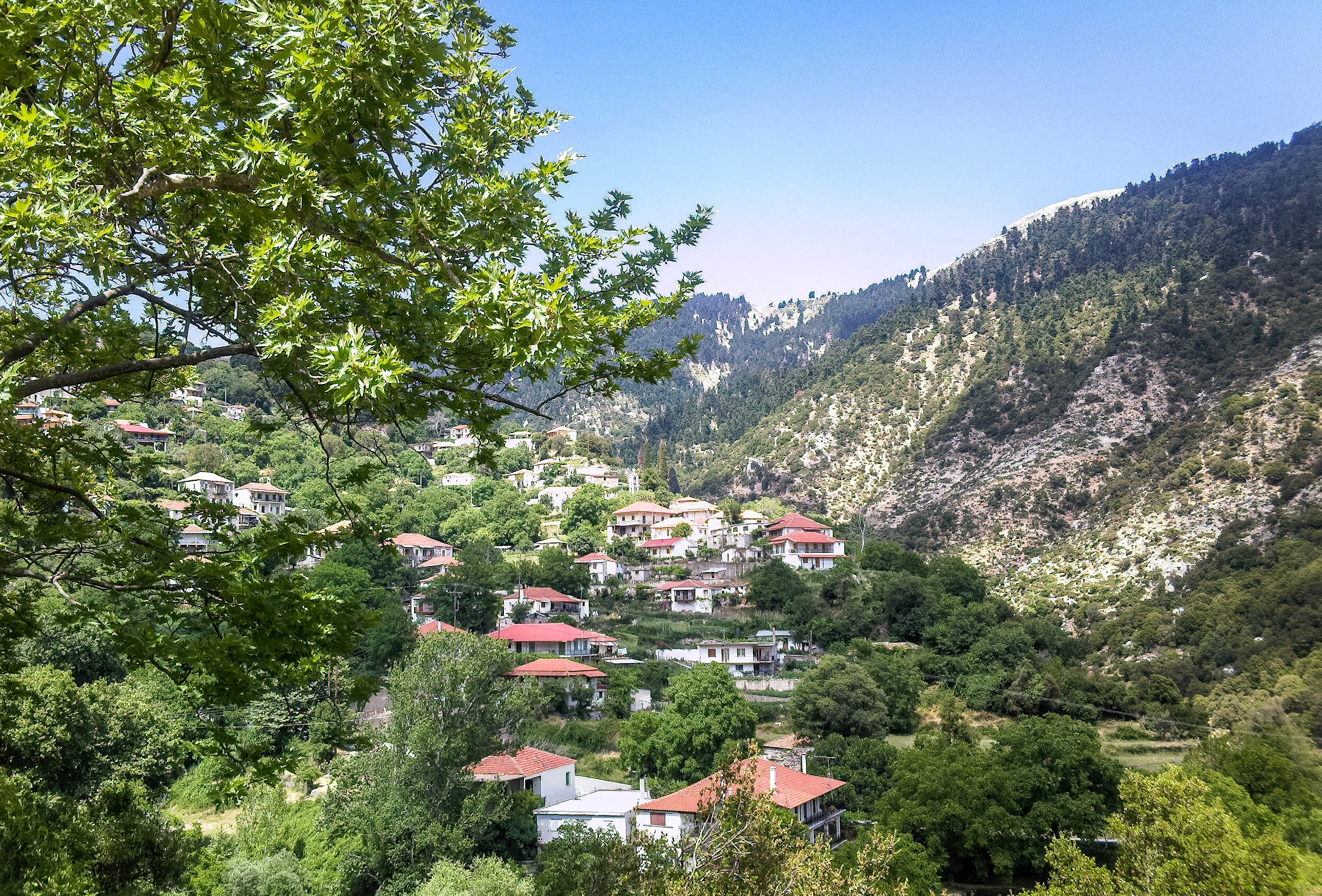
Lampeia (Divri) village, partial view of village.

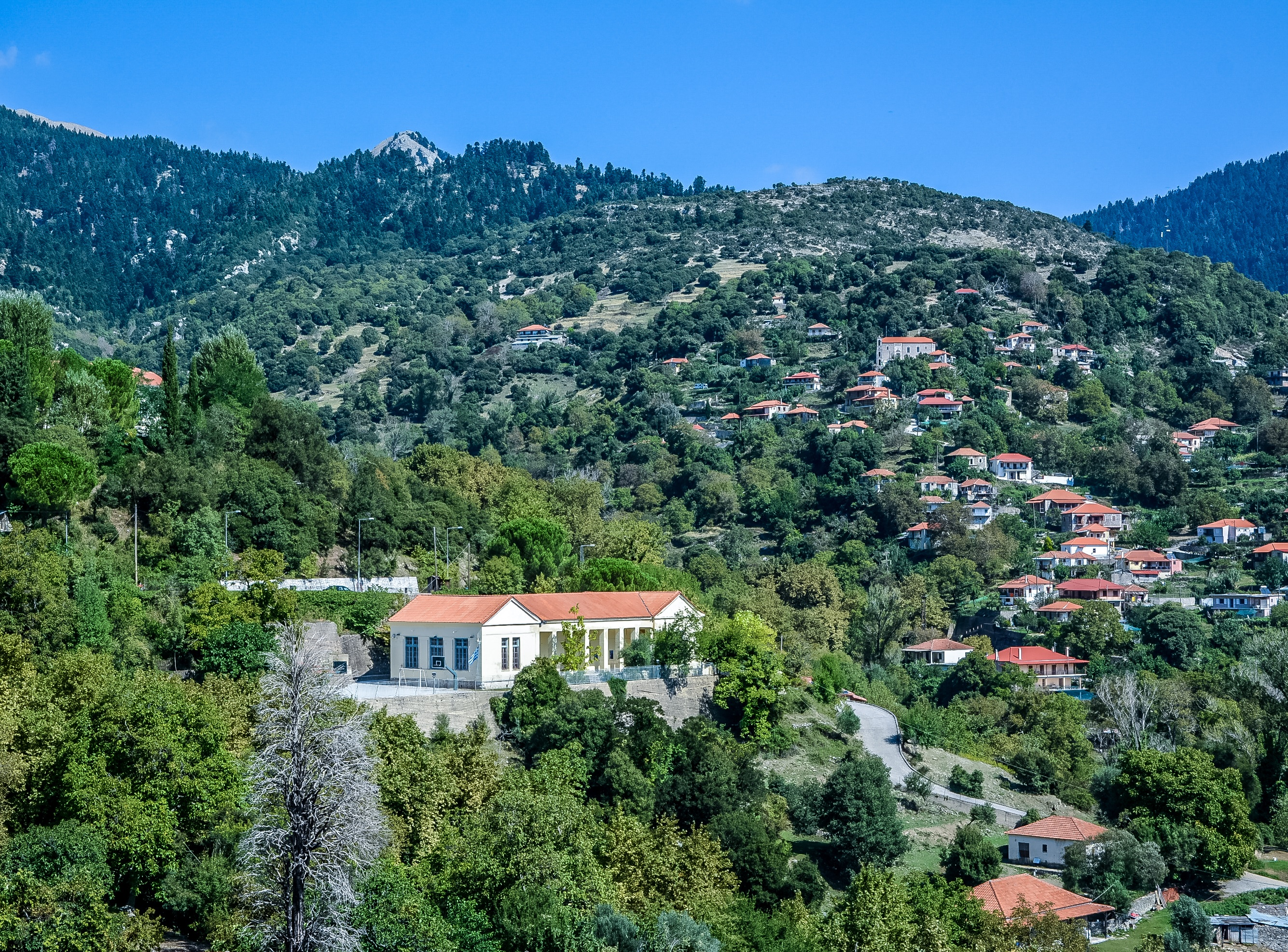
Elementary school in Lampia (Divri), built in 1907 with a donation of Andreas Syngrou.

Lampeia (Greek: Λάμπεια, before 1928: Δίβρη - Divri, between 1928 and 1929: Πρινόφυτον - Prinofyton) is a mountain village, a community and a former municipality in Elis, West Greece, Greece. Since the 2011 local government reform it is part of the municipality Archaia Olympia, of which it is a municipal unit. The municipal unit has an area of 72.447 km^{2}. The community includes the village Amygdali.

Lampeia is situated south of Mount Erymanthos, in the valley of a tributary of the river Erymanthos. Its elevation is 802 m above sea level. The Greek National Road 33 (Patras - Tripoli) passes through it. Lampeia is 4 km west of Oreini, 9 km northeast of Koumanis, 28 km northeast of Olympia and 45 km south of Patras.

== Subdivisions ==
The municipal unit Lampeia is subdivided into the following communities (constituent villages in brackets):

- Astras (Astras, Kalyvia Astra)
- Lampeia (Lampeia, Amygdali)
- Oreini (Oreini, Paliofytia)

== Population ==
Year	Village	Community	Municipality
1981	-	757	-
1991	576	-	1,243
2001	661	764	1,374
2011	468	529	1,000
2021	358	393	665

== History ==
The name Lampeia was taken from the mountain Lampeia, which is part of the Erymanthos range. According to Pausanias the river Erymanthos has its source on the mountain Lampeia, which is sacred to Pan. The area was part of Arcadia. Due to its inaccessibility, Lampeia saw few invaders. Also the Ottomans stayed in the lower areas for strategic reasons. The Zoodochos Pigi monastery in Lampeia was a centre of Greek culture and education. Several inhabitants fought in the Greek War of Independence, and some well known families of politicians (Petralias, Panagoulis, Stefanopoulos, Zafeiropoulos) came from Divri/Lampeia.

Lampeia was created as one of the eight municipalities of the Elis prefecture in the 1830s, and was disbanded in 1913. This municipality was larger than the present municipal unit, and included several villages now in adjacent municipal units (among others Koumanis, Antroni and Klindia). The municipality was recreated under the Capodistrian Plan in the late-1990s, and became a subdivision of the municipality of Archaia Olympia in 2011.

== Notable people ==
- Pavlos Matesis, writer

== See also ==
- List of settlements in Elis
