= Oreini, Elis =

Oreini Ορεινή
- Community
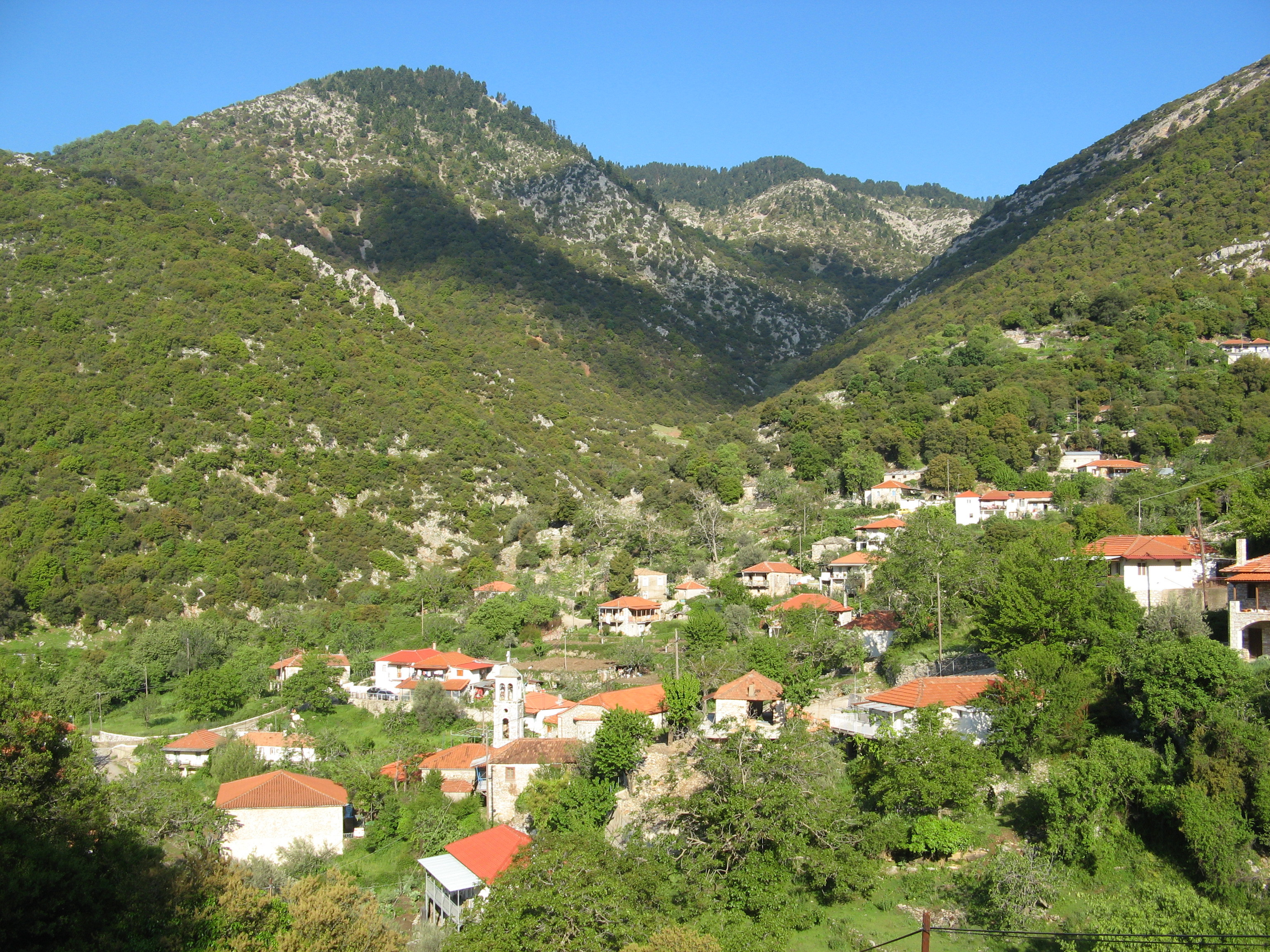

- Location within Greece
- Coordinates: 37°52′N 21°51′E
- Country: Greece
- Administrative region: West Greece
- Regional unit: Elis
- Municipality: Archaia Olympia
- Municipal unit: Lampeia

Population (2021)
  - Community: 90
- Time zone: UTC+2 (EET)
  - Summer (DST): UTC+3 (EEST)

Oreini (Greek: Ορεινή meaning "mountainous", before 1928: Μποστενίτσα - Bostenitsa) is a mountain village and a community in the municipal unit of Lampeia, Elis, Olympia, Greece. Oreini is built on the slopes of Mount Lampeia, part of the Erymanthos range. The community Oreini consists of the villages Oreini and Paliofytia. The population in 2021 was 90. Oreini is located 4 km east of Lampeia, 4 km west of Psofida, 6 km south of Agrampela and 32 km northeast of Olympia. The former name of the village, Bostenitsa, suggests a Slavic origin. The revolutionary leader Theodoros Papasimakopoulos, who fought in the Greek War of Independence, was from Bostenitsa.

== Gallery ==
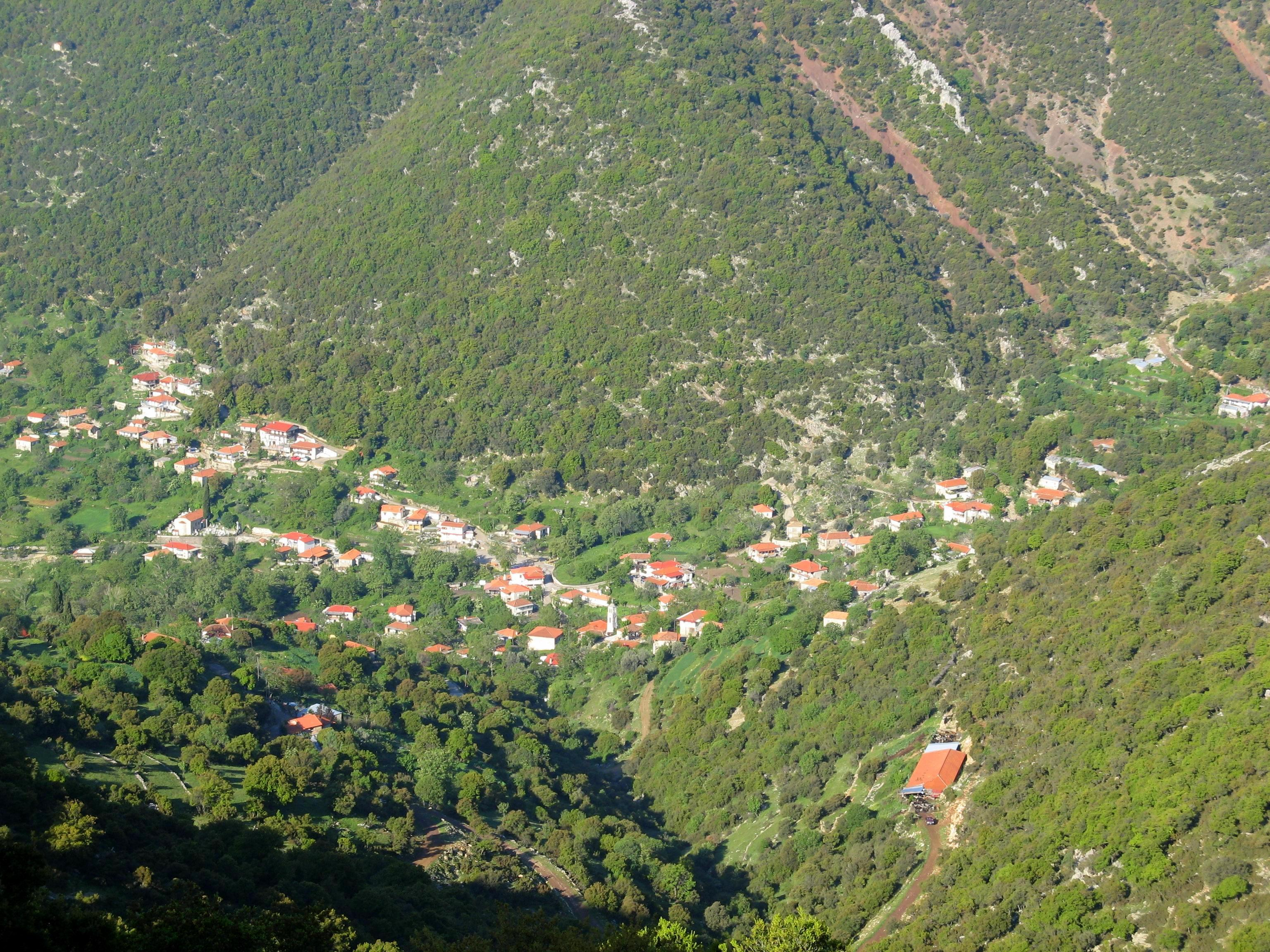

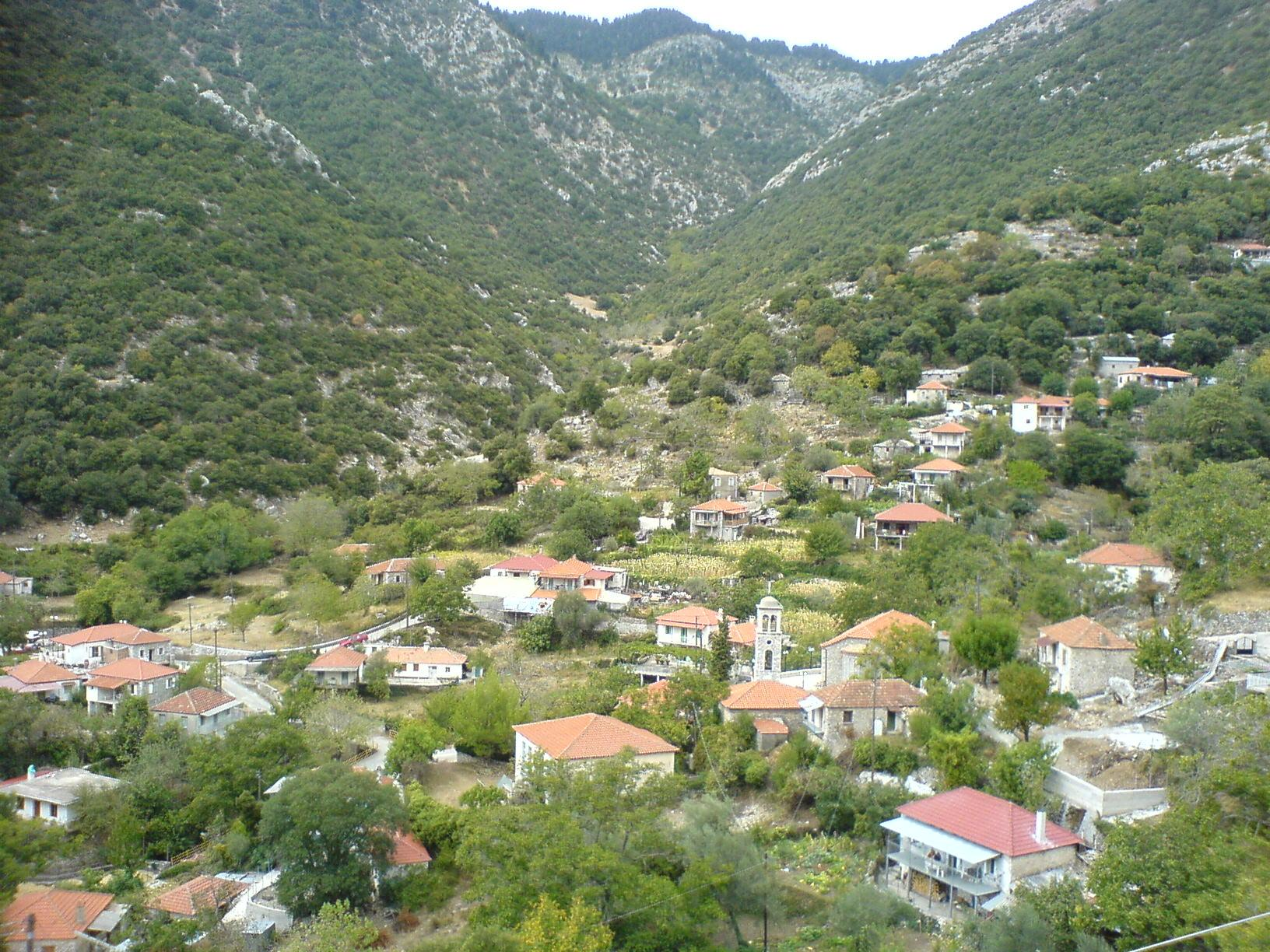

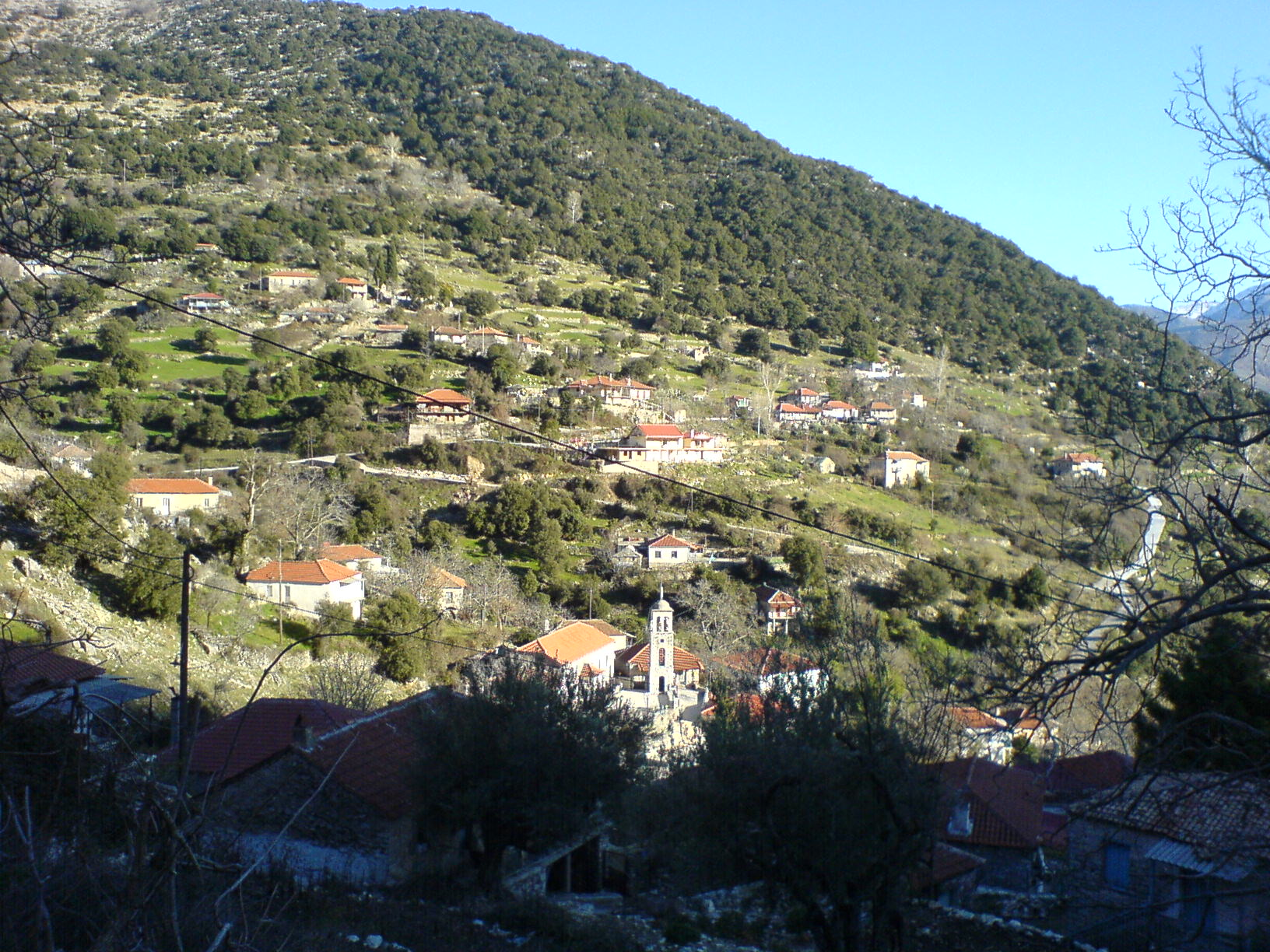

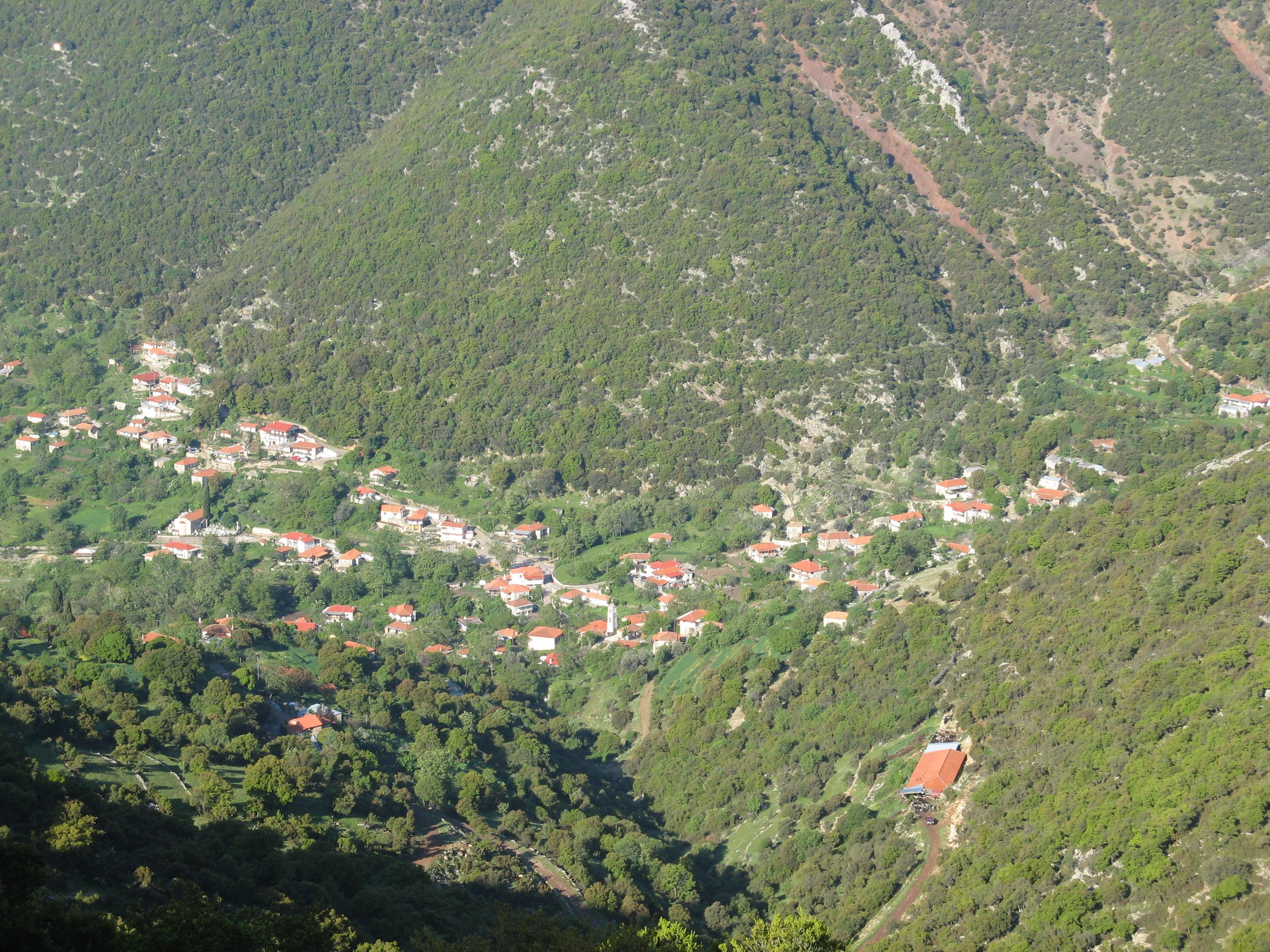

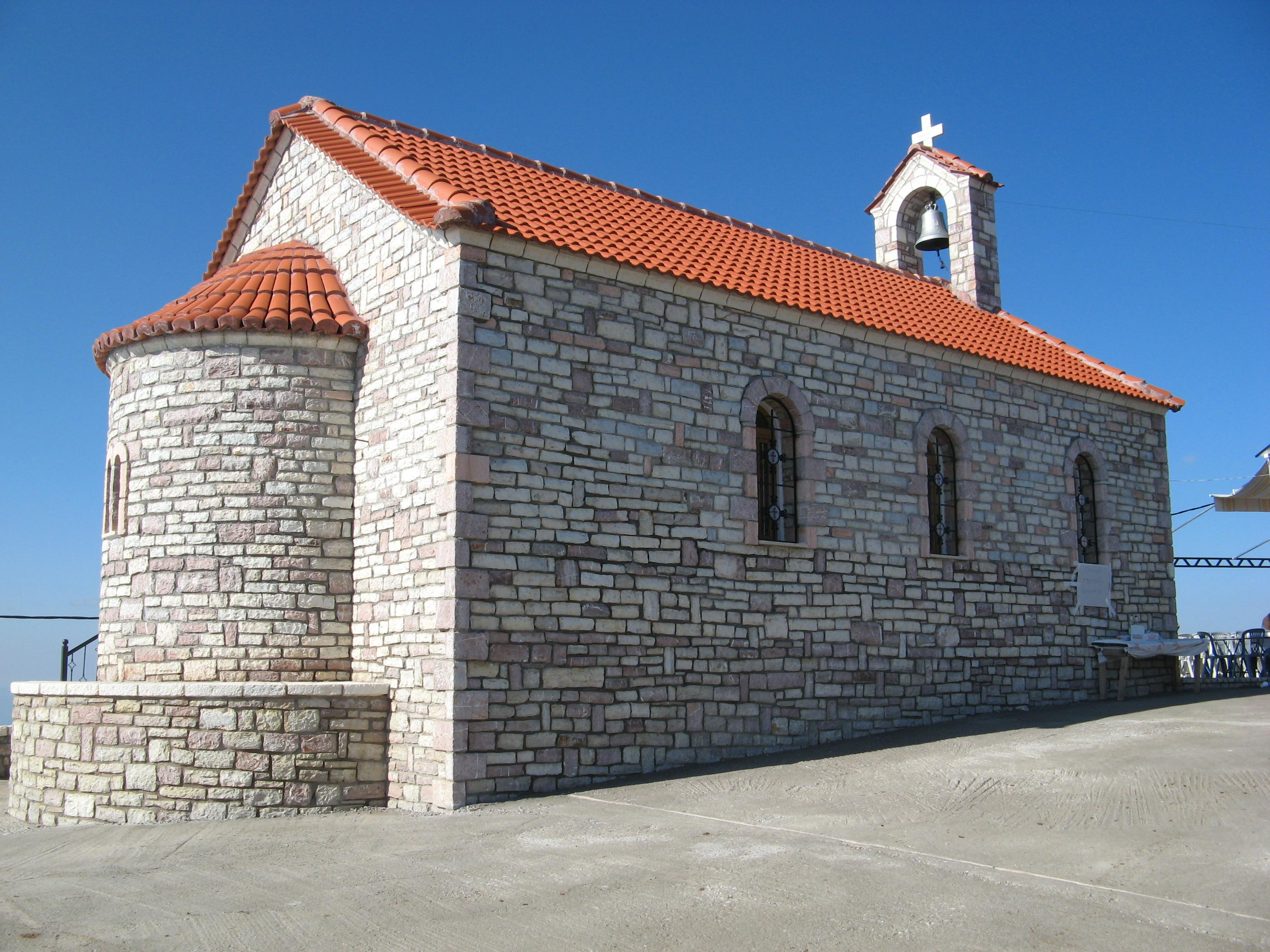
Church of Agios Ioannis

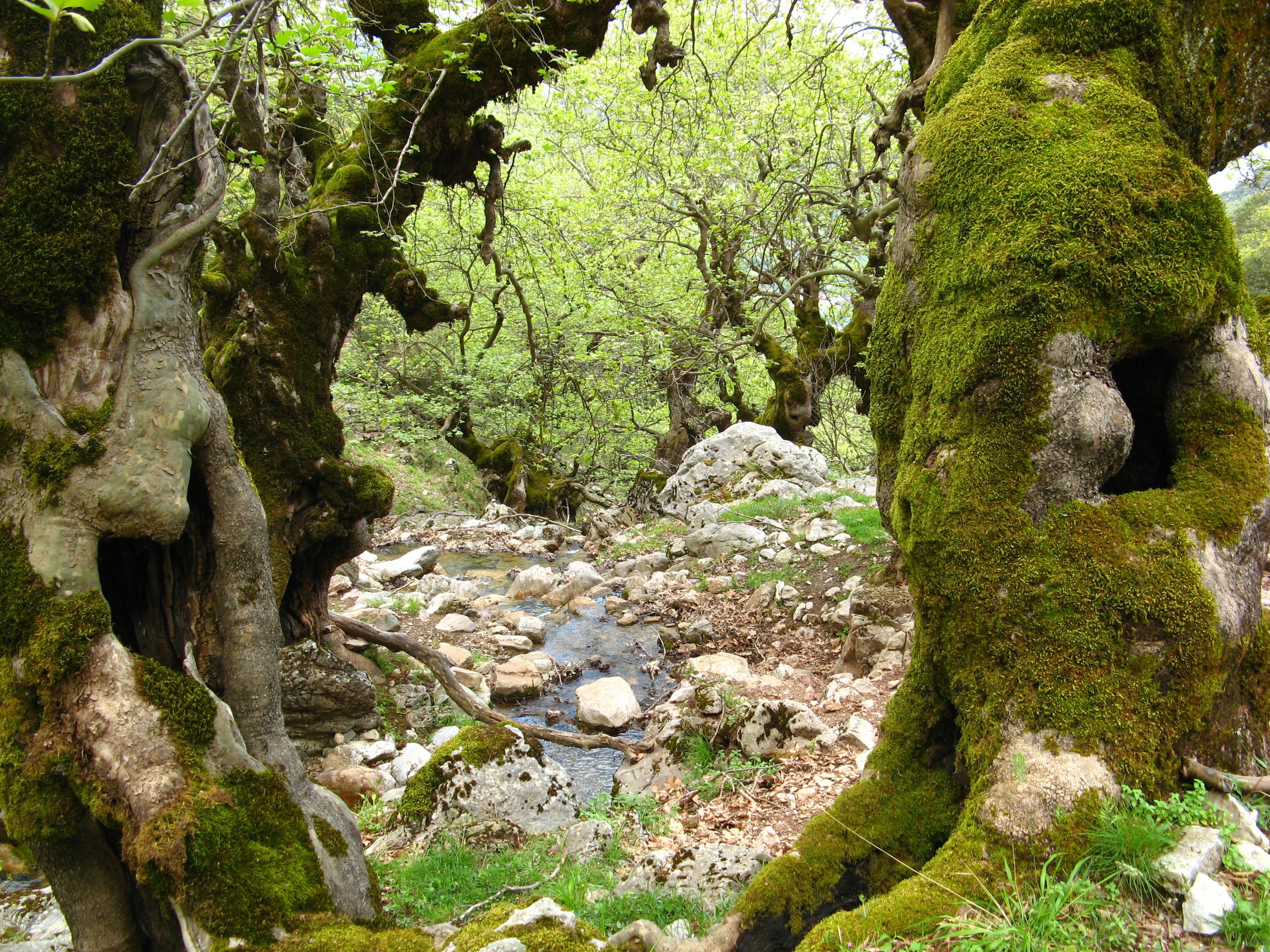

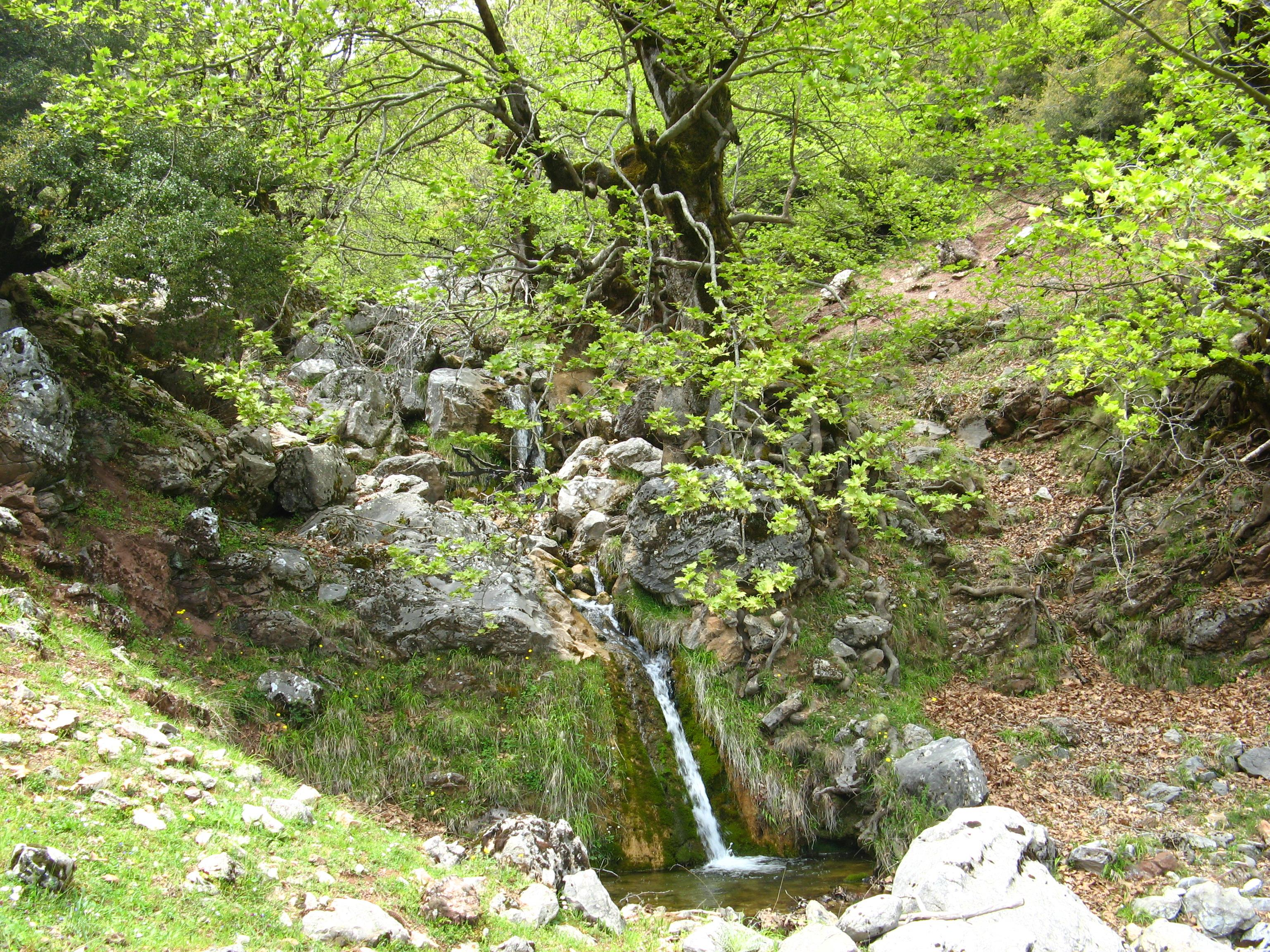

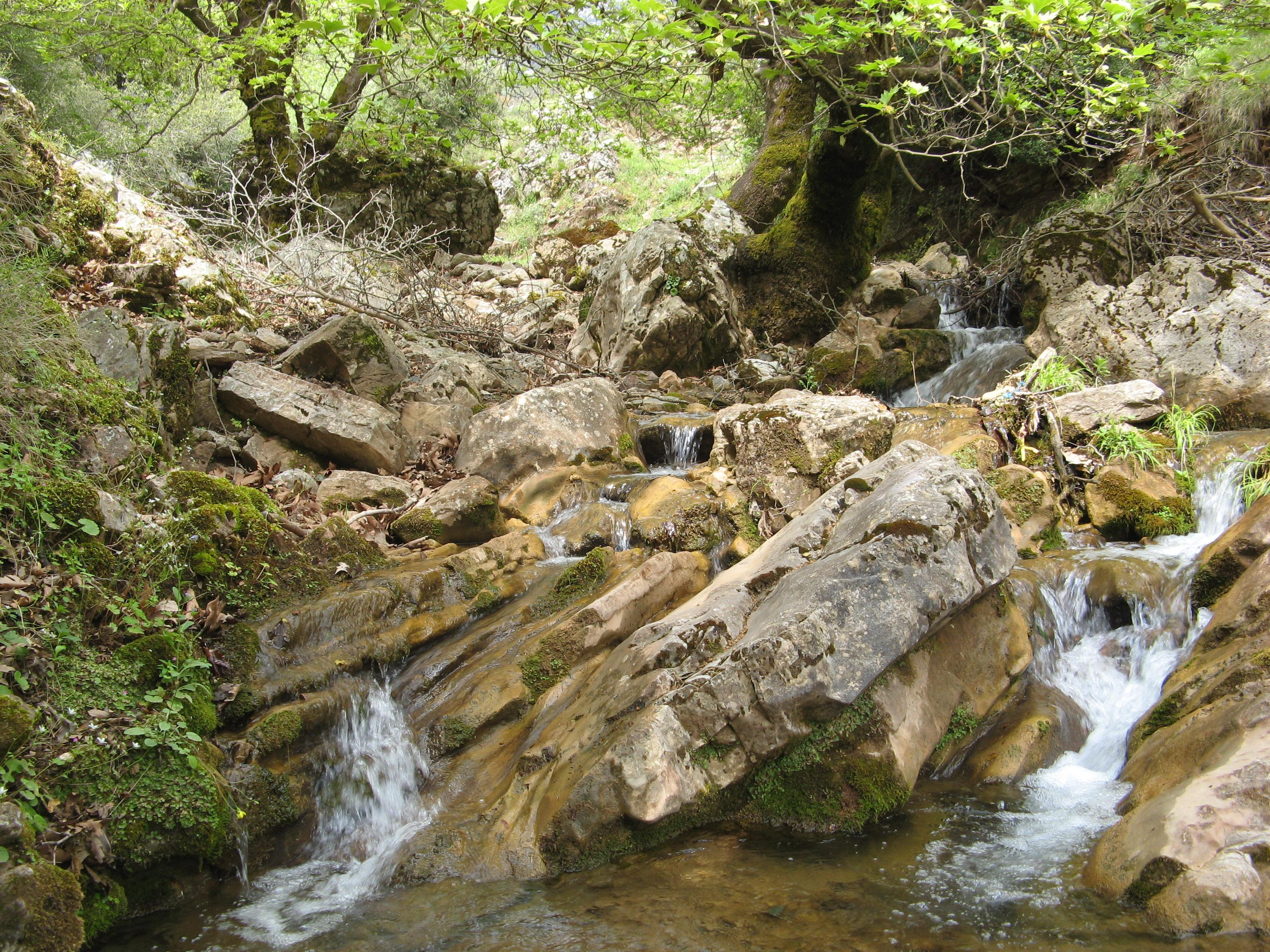

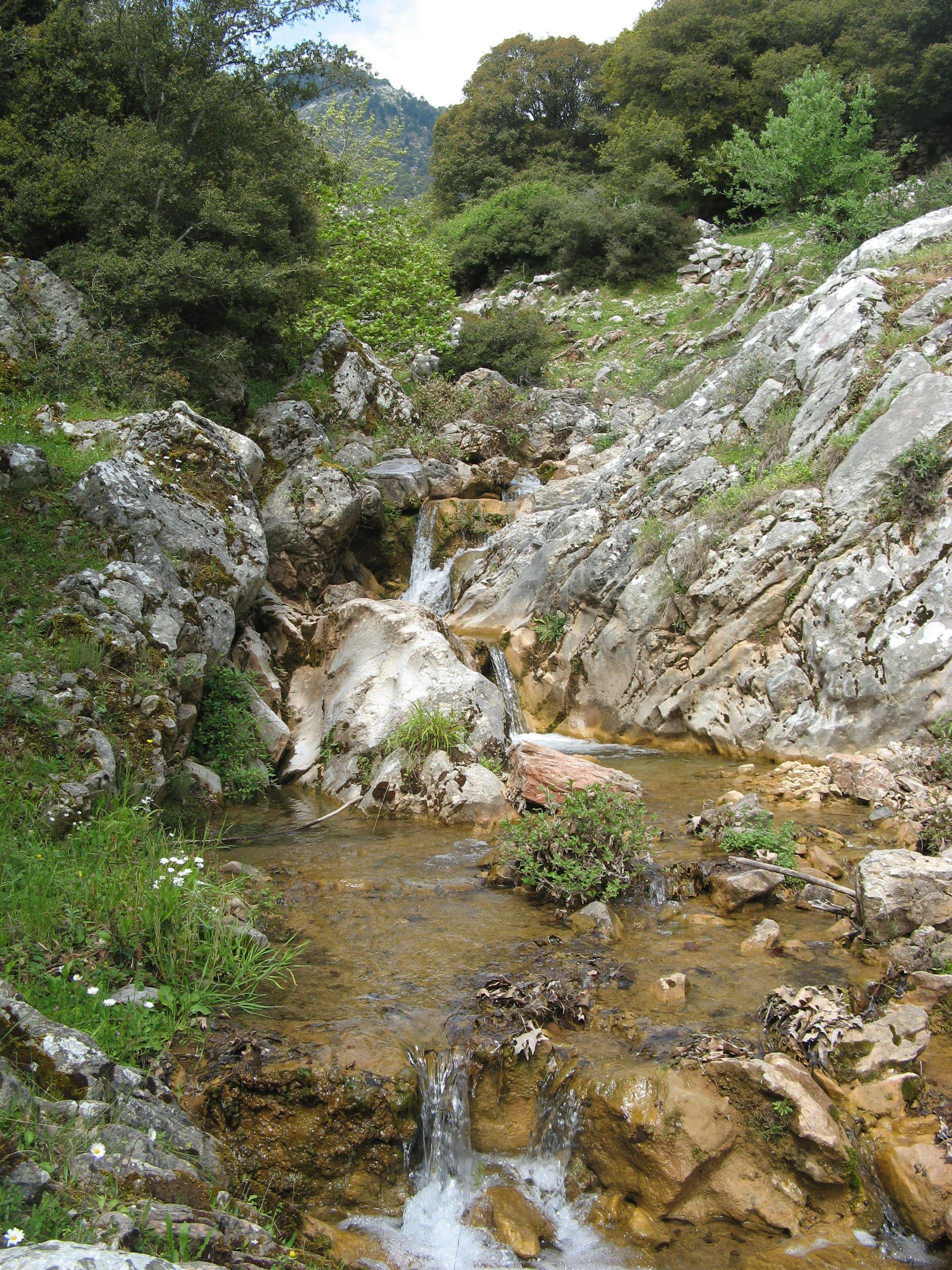

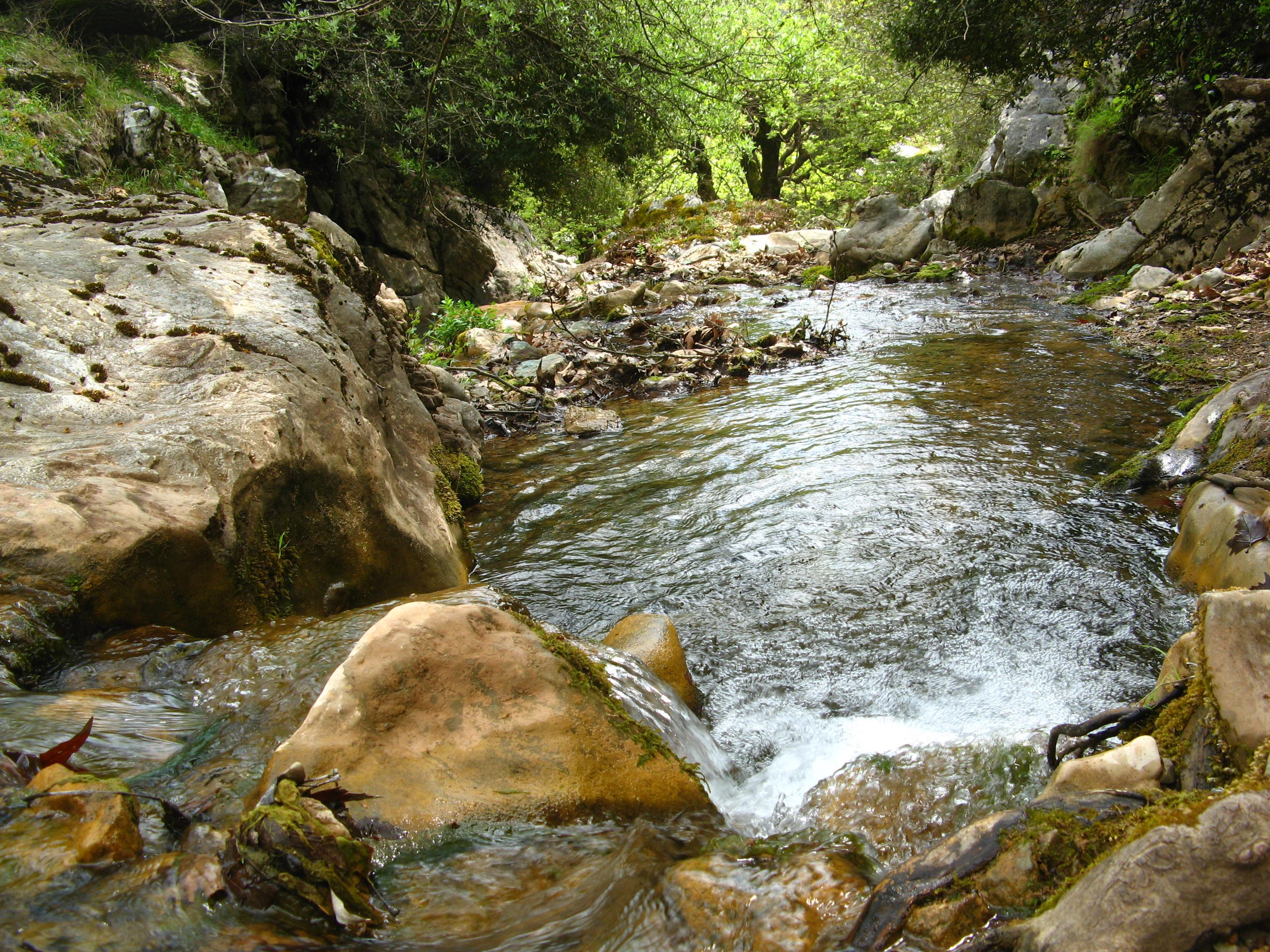

== See also ==
- List of settlements in Elis
