= Antroni =

Antroni Αντρώνι
- Community
- Location within Greece
- Coordinates: 37°48′N 21°43′E
- Country: Greece
- Administrative region: West Greece
- Regional unit: Elis
- Municipality: Archaia Olympia
- Municipal unit: Lasiona

Population (2021)
  - Community: 590
- Time zone: UTC+2 (EET)
  - Summer (DST): UTC+3 (EEST)

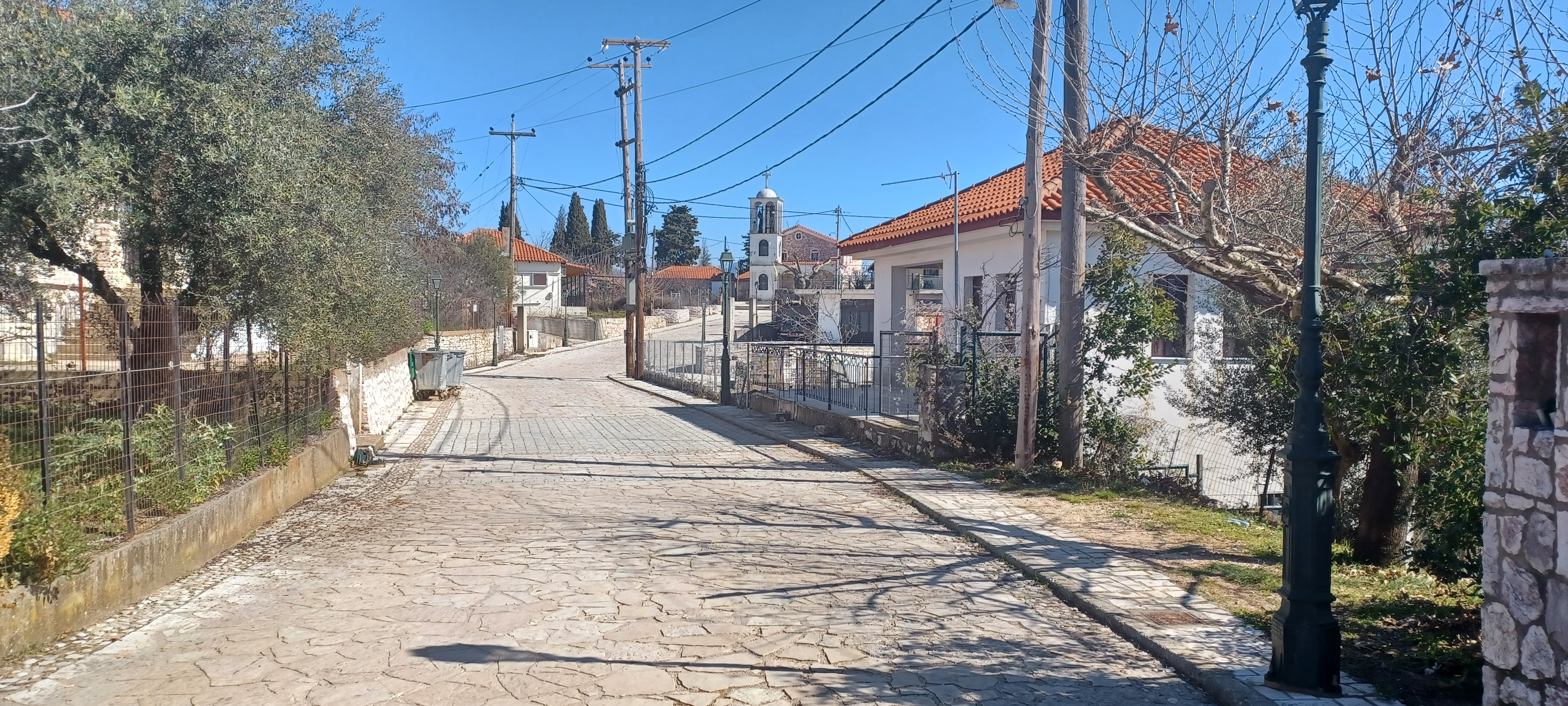
Antroni

Antroni (Greek: Αντρώνι) is a mountain village and a community in the municipal unit of Lasiona, Elis, Olympia, Greece. The community consists of the villages Antroni, Panopoulo, Zachareika and Chania Spartoulia. Antroni is situated near the Foloi oak forest, on a small plateau between deep and narrow river valleys. It is 1 km north of Foloi, 10 km southwest of Lampeia and 19 km northeast of Olympia. The Greek National Road 33 (Patras - Tripoli) runs through Panopoulo and Chania Spartoulia.

According to Greek mythology Heracles used a net to catch the Erymanthian Boar in a gorge near Antroni. Antroni was part of the municipality of Lampeia between the 1830s and 1912. It was an independent community until the 1998, when it joined the new municipality of Lasiona. This in turn became part of the municipality Archaia Olympia in 2011.

== Population ==
Year	Village population	Community population
1981	-	832
1991	376	-
2001	397	802
2011	274	573
2021	269	590

== See also ==
- List of settlements in Elis
