= Klindia =

Klindia Κλινδιά
- Community
- Location within Greece
- Coordinates: 37°47′N 21°40.8′E
- Country: Greece
- Administrative region: West Greece
- Regional unit: Elis
- Municipality: Pyrgos
- Municipal unit: Oleni

Population (2021)
  - Community: 136
- Time zone: UTC+2 (EET)
  - Summer (DST): UTC+3 (EEST)
- Postal code: 27060

Klindia (Greek: Κλινδιά) is a small remote village hidden in the mountains, in the municipal unit of Oleni, Elis, Greece. It lies 2 km northeast of Pefki, 4 km west of Foloi, 4 km east of Agia Anna and 45 km northeast of Pyrgos.
