= Oleni =

Oleni Ωλένη
- Municipal unit
- Location within the regional unit

- Location within Greece
- Coordinates: 37°44′N 21°33′E
- Country: Greece
- Administrative region: West Greece
- Regional unit: Elis
- Municipality: Pyrgos

Area
  - Municipal unit: 152.2 km^{2} (58.8 sq mi)
- Elevation: 240 m (790 ft)

Population (2021)
  - Municipal unit: 4,651
  - Municipal unit density: 30.56/km^{2} (79.15/sq mi)
  - Community: 404
- Time zone: UTC+2 (EET)
  - Summer (DST): UTC+3 (EEST)
- Postal code: 270 64
- Area code: 26210
- Vehicle registration: ΗΑ
- Website: www.oleni.gov.gr

Oleni (Greek: Ωλένη) is a village and a former municipality in Elis, West Greece, Greece.

Since the 2011 local government reform it is part of the municipality Pyrgos, of which it is a municipal unit. The municipal unit has an area of 152.231 km^{2}. The seat of the municipality was in Karatoula.

The municipal unit was named after the ruined medieval town Olena, which also gave its name to the Bishopric of Olena. It consists of a wide valley around Karatoula and Magoula, and the hills west and east of the valley. It is located about 10 km northeast of Pyrgos, 13 km northwest of Olympia and 20 km southeast of Amaliada. The largest community is Goumero. The ancient town Amphidolis was located near present Karatoula.

== Subdivisions ==
The municipal unit Oleni is subdivided into the following communities (constituent villages in brackets):

- Agia Anna
- Arvaniti
- Charia
- Cheimadio
- Goumero
- Karatoula (Karatoula, Kleidereika, Marmara)
- Karya (Karya, Varvarina, Sitochori)
- Klindia
- Koutsochera
- Lanthi (Lanthi, Moni Kremastis)
- Latzoi (Latzoi, Agios Georgios, Almyriki, Grammatikos)
- Magoula (Magoula, Katsomaliareika)
- Mouzaki
- Oleni
- Pefki
- Sopi

== Historical population ==
| Year | Population |
|---|---|
| 1991 | 7,560 |
| 2001 | 9,026 |
| 2011 | 5,815 |
| 2021 | 4,651 |

== See also ==
- List of settlements in Elis

== Sources and external links ==
- Municipality Of Oleni Web Site
- Panoleniakos Karatoula Football Club
