= Stavrodromi =

Community in Erymanthos, Achaea, Greece

Stavrodromi Σταυροδρόμι
- Community
- Location within Greece
- Coordinates: 37°56′N 21°41′E
- Country: Greece
- Administrative region: West Greece
- Regional unit: Achaea
- Municipality: Erymanthos
- Municipal unit: Tritaia

Population (2021)
  - Community: 297
- Time zone: UTC+2 (EET)
  - Summer (DST): UTC+3 (EEST)

Stavrodromi (Greek: Σταυροδρόμι meaning crossroads) is a village and a community in Achaea, Greece. The community consists of the villages Stavrodromi, Panousaiika, Rachi and Xirochori. It is located in a hilly area northwest of Mount Erymanthos, 35 km (22 mi) south of Patras. The Greek National Road 33 (Patras - Tripoli) runs through the village. Stavrodromi was the seat of the municipality of Tritaia.

== Population ==
Year	Village population	Community population
1981	-	403
1991	192	-
2001	254	536
2011	153	278
2021	143	297

== See also ==
- List of settlements in Achaea
