= Konstantinos Giannias =

Greek klepht

Konstantinos Giannias Κωνσταντίνος Γιαννιάς
- Born: 1760; Prostovitsa, Ottoman Empire (now Drosia, Achaia, Greece)
- Died: 1805 (aged 44–45); Patras, Ottoman Empire (now Achaea, Greece)
- Occupation: klepht

Konstantinos Giannias (Greek: Κωνσταντίνος Γιαννιάς, 1760–1805) was a Greek klepht who operated in the Peloponnese. Giannias was born in Prostovitsa, a village now known as Drosia in Achaia. He was the brother of Giannis Giannias.

He became a klepht at a very young age and ran a large klepht group mainly between 1787 until 1805 when founded under the leader by the name of Zacharias. Together with the doctor and the Lieutenant Tzimiko he first fought with Mahmud Bey from Mystras where he was trained and continuously left with his horse. He participated in many battles against the Ottoman Turks until 1805 when he was hanged. He has a statue in Marouda Square in Patras today.
