= Karatoula, Elis =

Karatoula Καράτουλα
- Community
- Location within Greece
- Coordinates: 37°44′N 21°32′E
- Country: Greece
- Administrative region: West Greece
- Regional unit: Elis
- Municipality: Pyrgos
- Municipal unit: Oleni

Population (2021)
  - Community: 602
- Time zone: UTC+2 (EET)
  - Summer (DST): UTC+3 (EEST)
- Postal code: 27064
- Area code: 26210

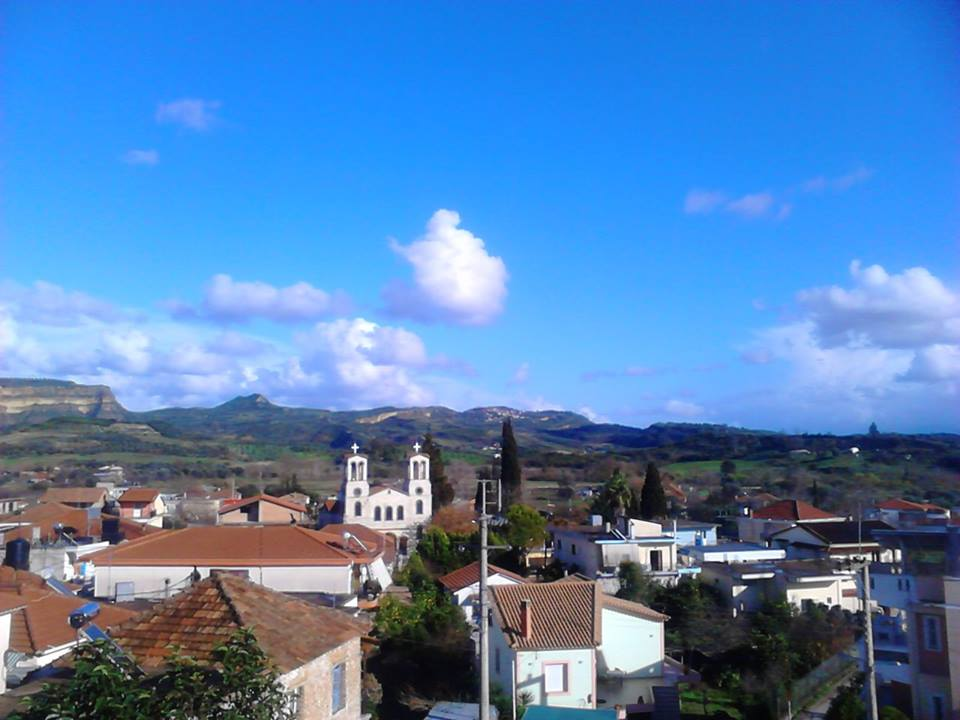

Karatoula (Greek: Καράτουλα, also Καράτουλας Karatoulas) is a village in the municipal unit of Oleni, central Elis, Greece. Karatoula was the seat of the former municipality of Oleni. It is situated in a wide valley between hills, at about 90 m elevation. Karatoula is 1 km north of Magoula, 2 km west of Oleni (village), 2 km east of Charia, 13 km northwest of Olympia and 11 km northeast of Pyrgos. The river Alyseios, also known as Karatoulaiko Potami, flows west of the village.

== History ==
According to book references, the ancient town Amphidolis was located at the site of present Karatoula.. Ottoman Years: Karatoula was the largest village of Oleni region and almost at the center of many other small villages, at the time. It had an "Agas" administrative seat. The name of its first Agas was Kara-Toulas, hence the name of the village changed to Karatoula. Agas built his residence palace in the eastern part of the village on the dominant hill, the ruins of which survive even today, next to house Theodore Theodorakopoulos, doctor.

Karatoula as adjoining the Episkopin Olena, and as relations with their respective bishops, had a high influence on all the passages of Oleni. In the northern part of the village and spaced about twenty minutes there was small underground church. Ruins are preserved today under the name "Agios Dimitrios".

Karatoula gave brave warriors under the leadership of Pierros and Davouras, who met with other soldiers rising for Poussi Greek troops and took part in the battle Bodine.

== Population ==
Year	Population
1981	594
1991	964
2001	872
2011	699
2021	602

== See also ==
- List of settlements in Elis
