= Foloi oak forest =

Oak forest in southwestern Greece

Coordinates: 37°45′N 21°45′E

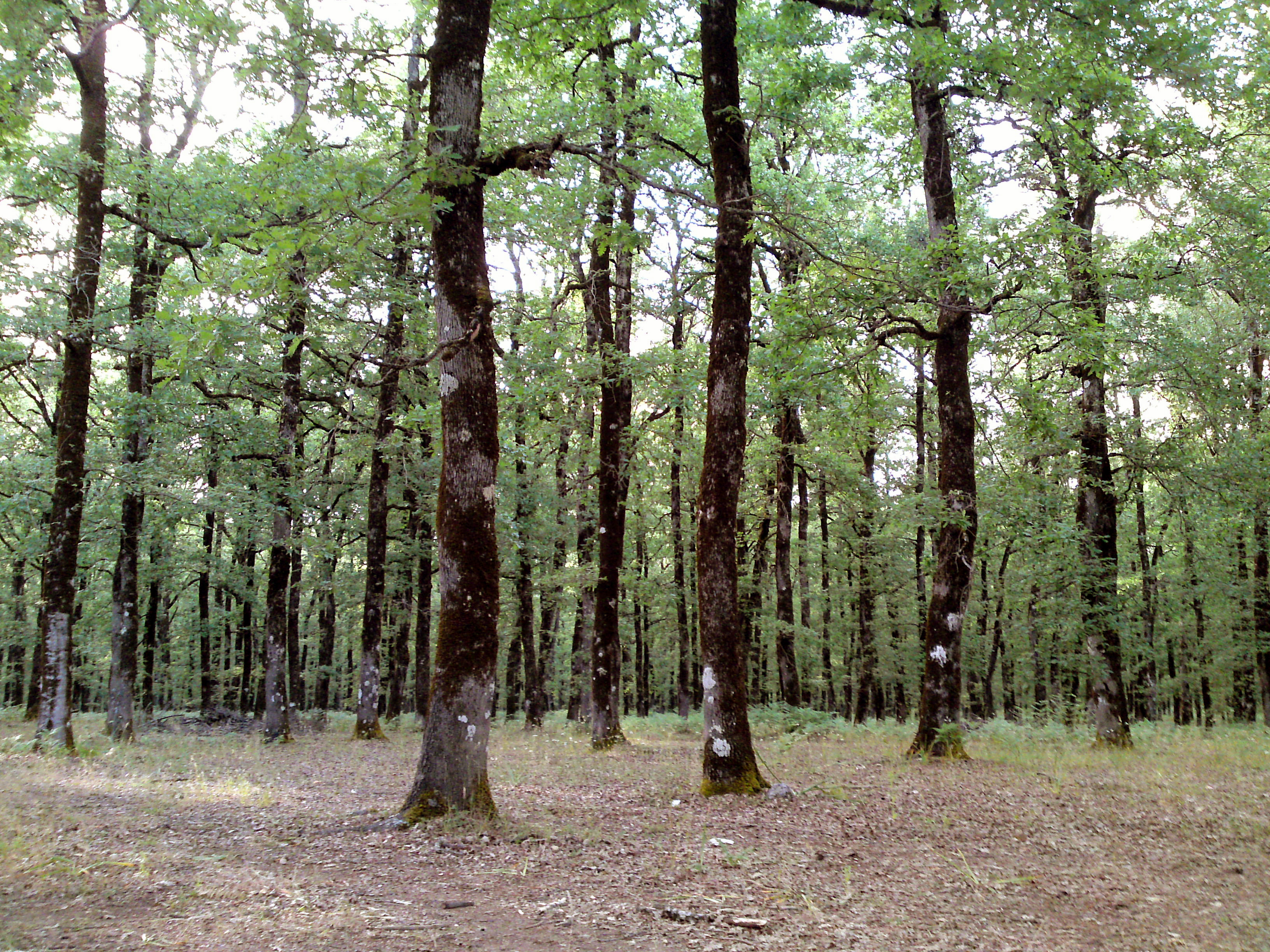
The Foloi oak forest in early summer

The Folóï oak forest (Greek: Δρυοδάσος Φολόης) is an oak forest in southwestern Greece. It is located in the municipal unit of Foloi, Olympia, Elis, in the western part of the Peloponnese peninsula. The Folóï oak forest is situated at an altitude of 688 m (2,260 ft), on the plateau of the Folóï mountain. It is an ecosystem unique in the Balkan Peninsula and consists of a territory of 40 km^{2} (9,900 acres), which is almost entirely covered by deciduous oaks that form a dense forest area.

== Mythology ==
The Pholóē oak forest was known to Ancient Greeks, because of its proximity to many of their settlements in the Elis region. The mysterious beauty of the forest inspired them to believe that it was a habitat of centaurs and dryads. They gave the forest the name Pholóē (Greek: Φολόη, modern Greek pronunciation: Folóï) and the chief of the Centaurs the name Phólos (Greek: Φόλος). The dryads (Greek: Δρυάδες) were "oak spirits" of the forest.

== Flora ==
The broadleaf oak, Quercus frainetto (Hungarian oak) is the primary species of oak in the forest, and it covers the biggest part of its territory. The trees are 15–20 m (49–66 ft) tall and can live up to 200 years. Quercus pubescens (downy oak) and evergreen Quercus ilex (holm oak) are also present, though their population is substantially smaller. Besides oaks, ferns and asphodels are very common and they tend to grow in the space between the trunks of the trees.

== Fauna ==
The acorns provide an abundant source of food for animals such as hares, squirrels, and hedgehogs, which are found in significant populations. The ecosystem of the forest is a food chain which also contains badgers, pine martens, foxes, eagles, turtles, weasels, owls, skylarks, jackals, magpies, vipers, rat snakes and others.

== Protection status ==
The Folóï oak forest has been designated the status of a protected area enlisted in the Natura 2000 ecological network of the E.U.

== Nearest places ==
- Ancient Olympia

== Gallery ==
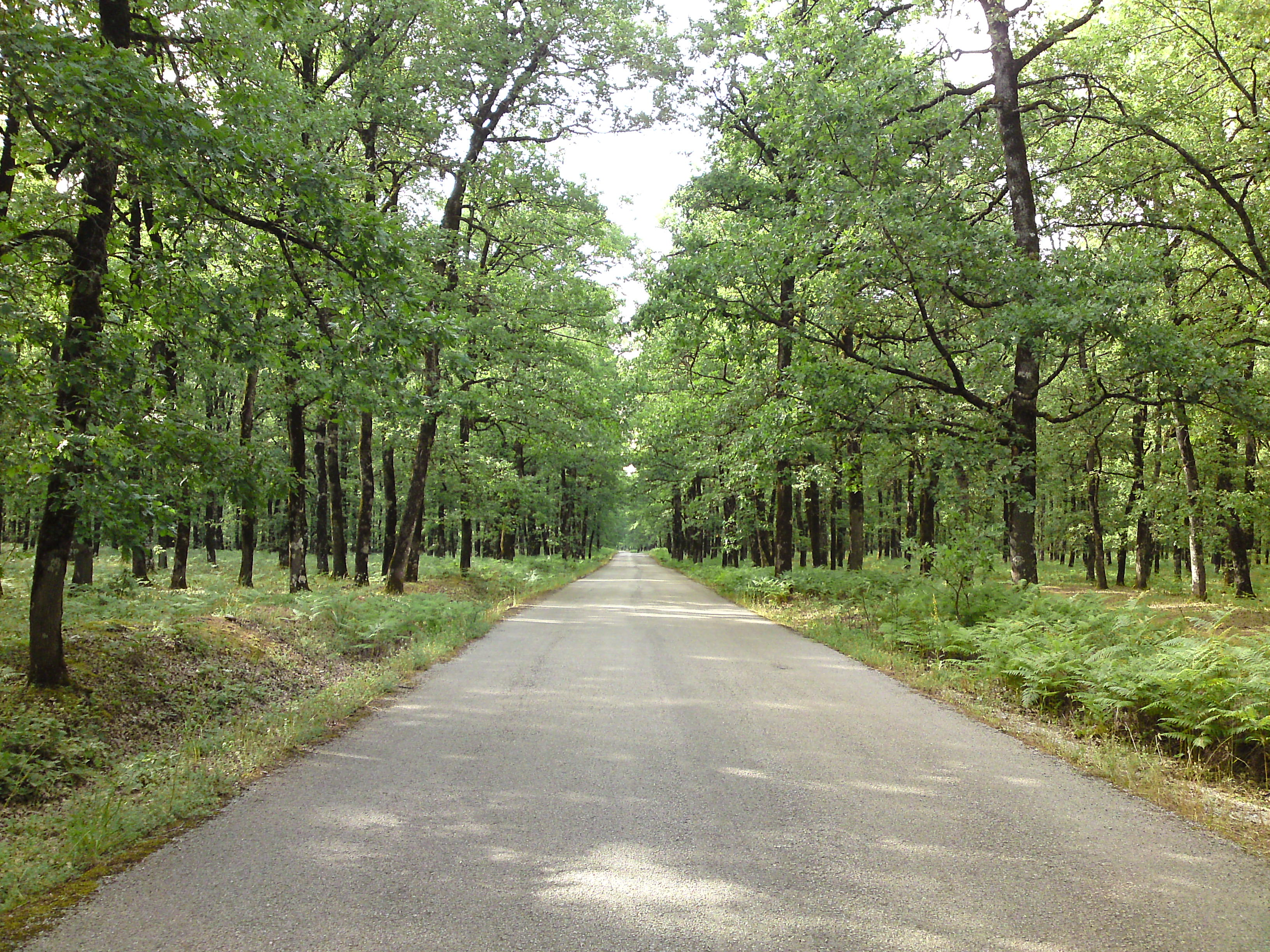
On the road inside the forest.

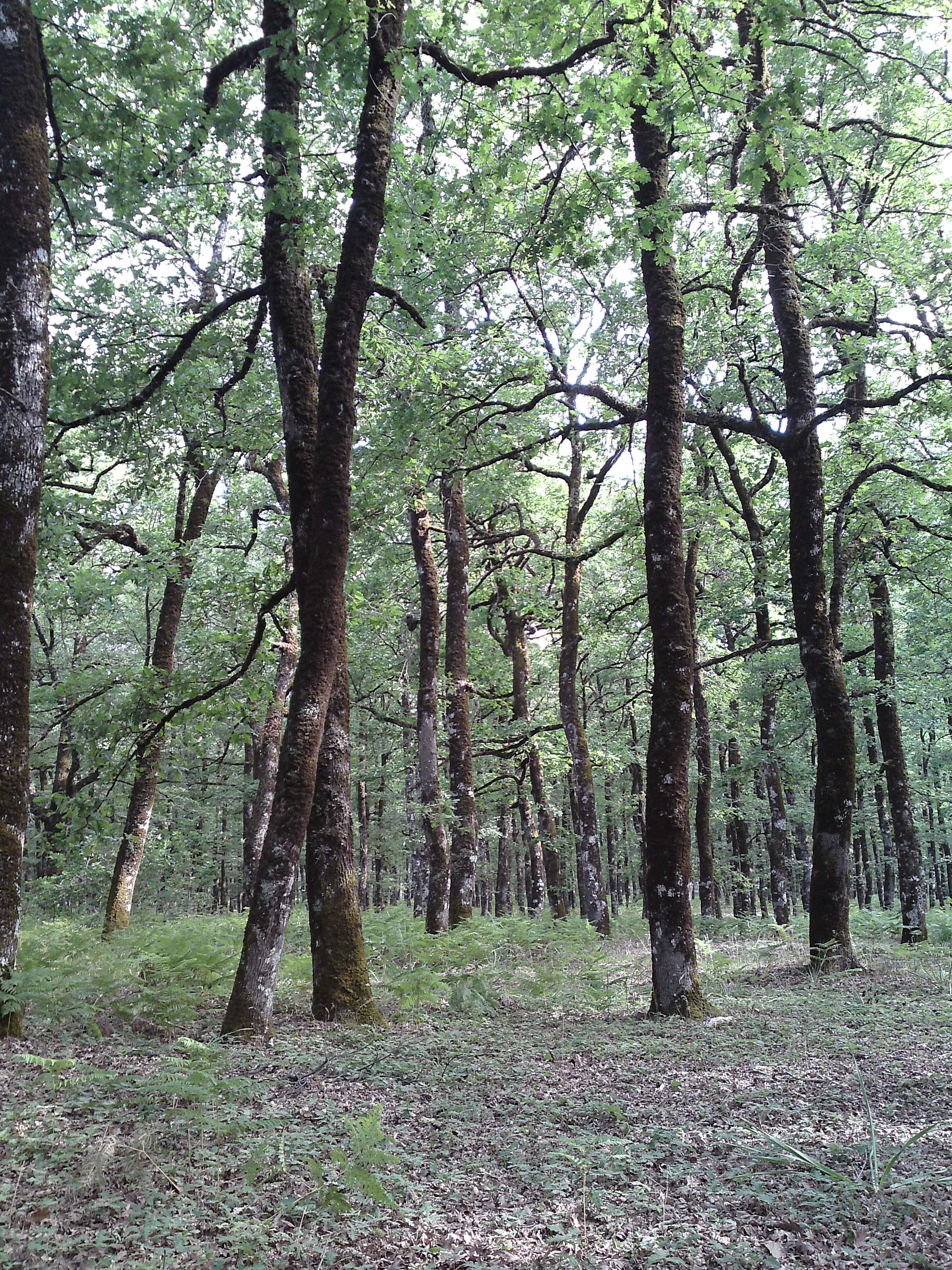
The oaks form a dense forest.

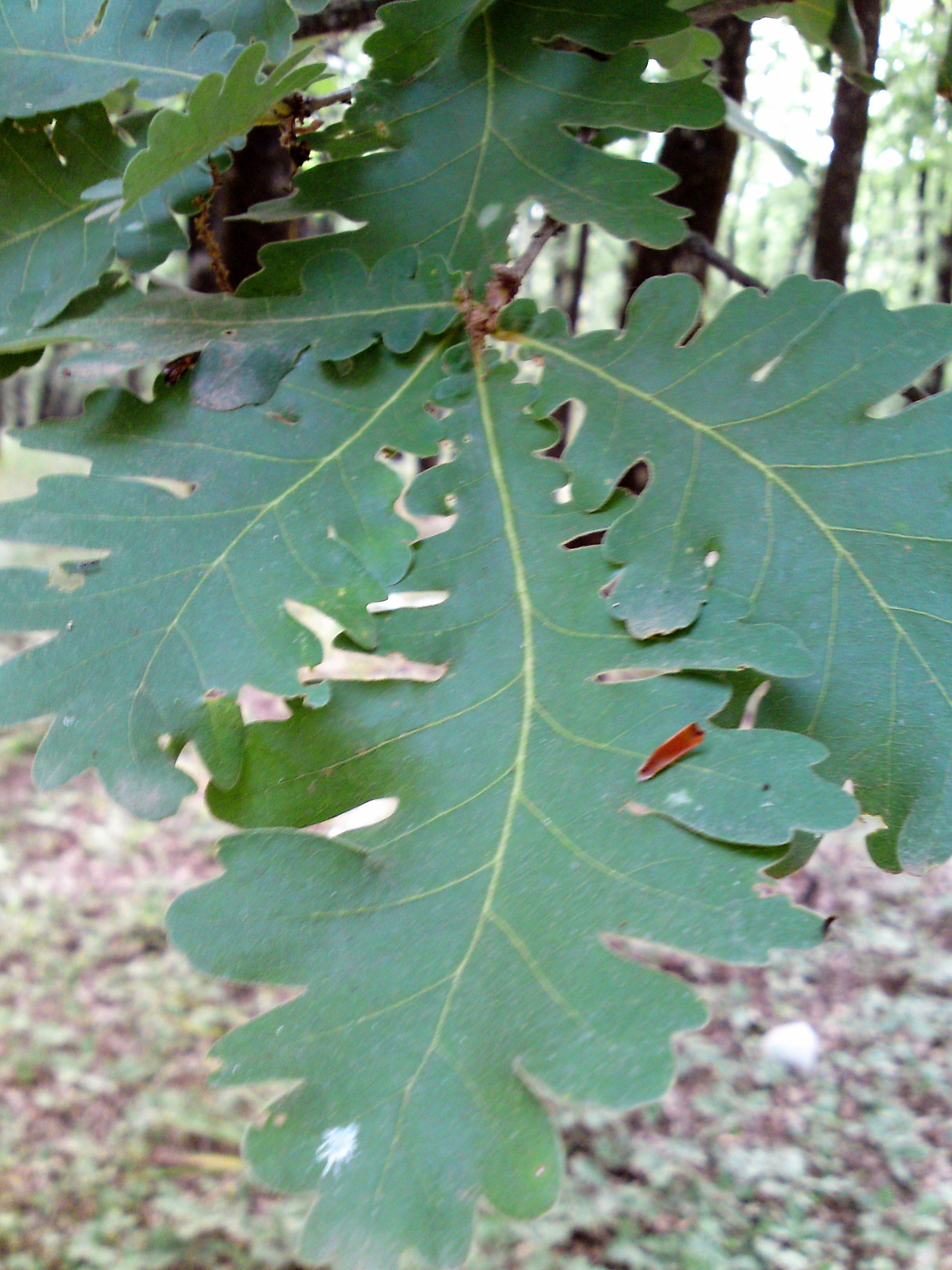
Leaves of Quercus frainetto (Hungarian oak).

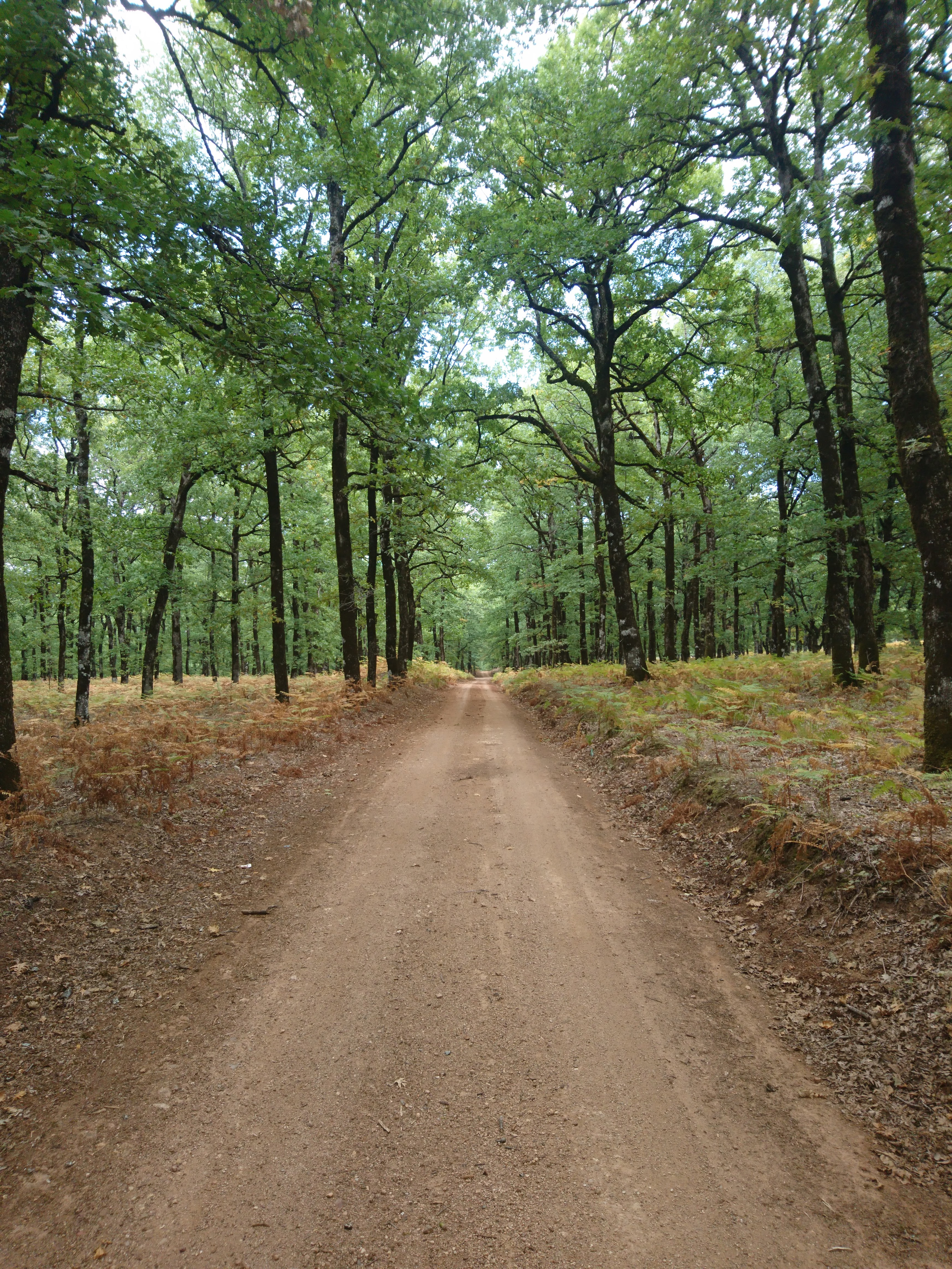
Landscape in Foloi oak forest.

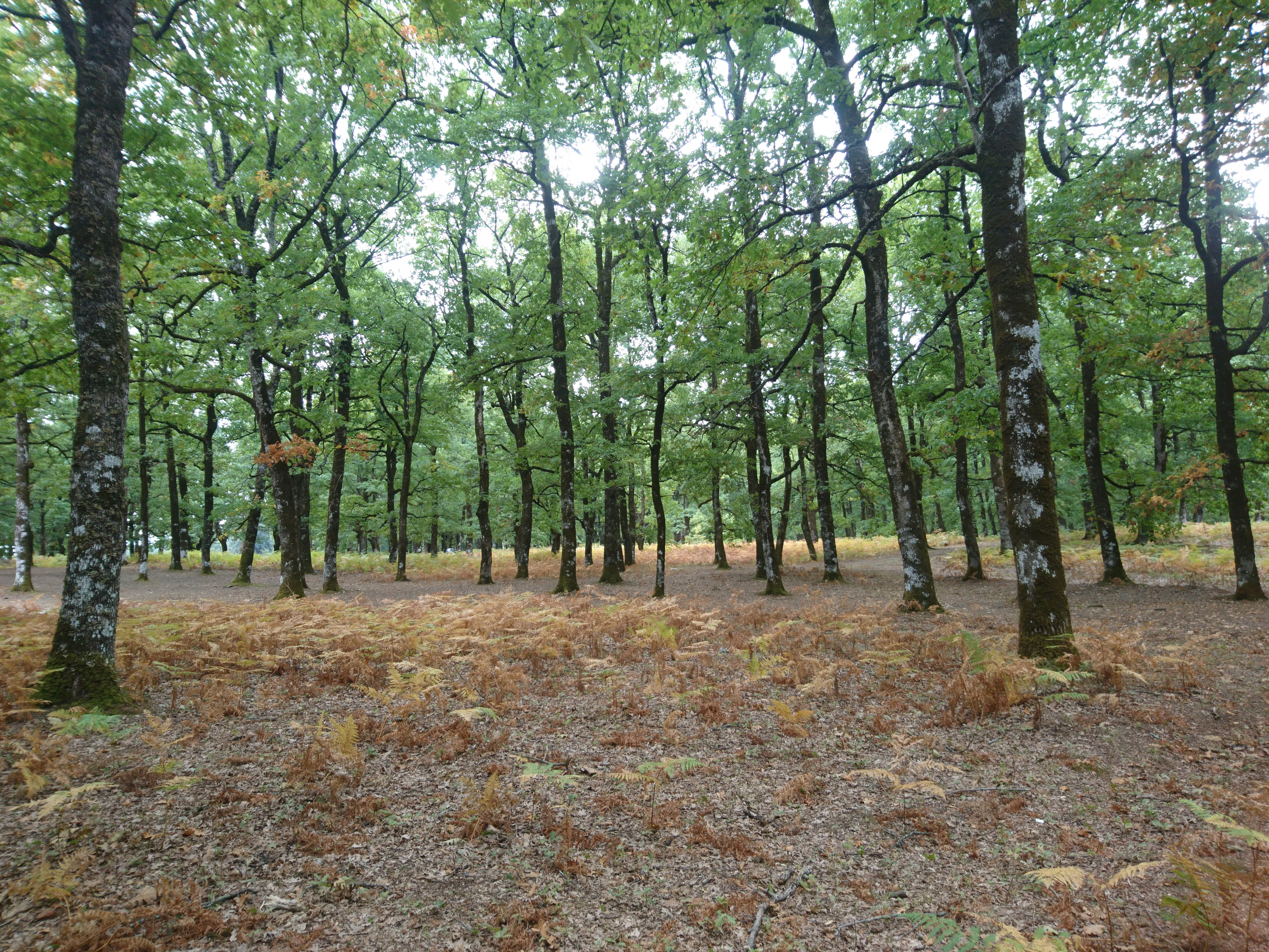
Landscape in Foloi oak forest.
