= Battle of Kalavryta =

Battle of the Greek Civil War (1948)

- Part of the Greek Civil War
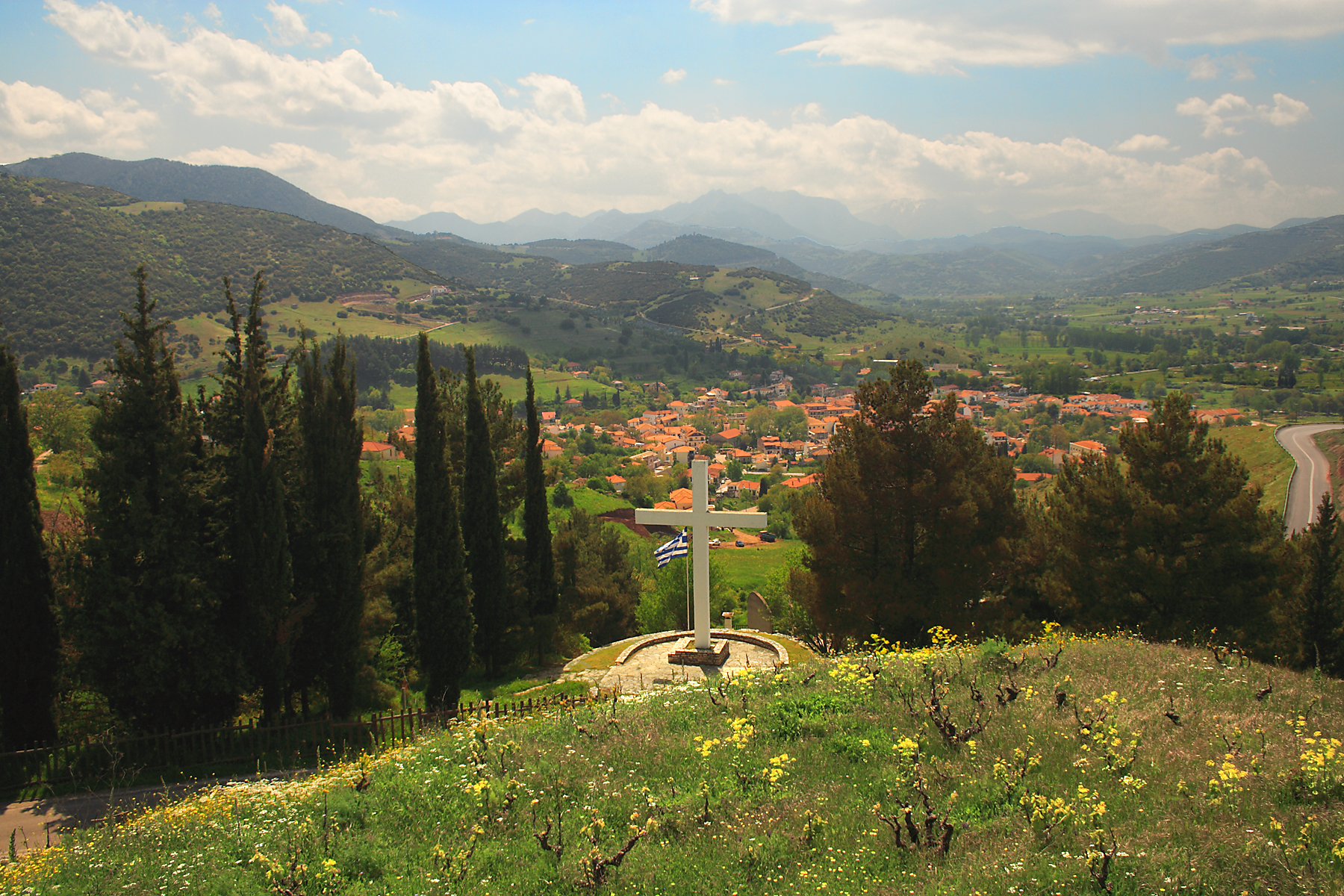
- View of Kalavryta
Date	11–12 April 1948
Location	Lintochoro, Achaea, Greece 38°2′N 22°7′E
Result	Democratic Army victory

Belligerents
Provisional Democratic Government; Democratic Army of Greece	Kingdom of Greece; Hellenic National Guard; Hellenic Gendarmerie; MAY

Commanders and leaders
Stephanos Giouzelis; Kostas Kanellopoulos	Nikolaos Arvanitakis

Strength
1,000–1,100	700

Casualties and losses
10–27 killed 25–40 wounded	44–50 killed 160–300 captured
- Location of the battle in Greece

The Battle of Kalavryta (Greek: Μάχη των Καλαβρύτων) took place between 11 and 12 April 1948. It was fought as part of the Greek Civil War, pitting forces of the Democratic Army of Greece (DSE) led by Stephanos Giouzelis against the government garrison of Kalavryta under Nikolaos Arvanitakis.

In the early morning hours of 11 April, DSE fighters launched an offensive on Kalavryta from multiple directions, while small groups of commandos infiltrated the city center. DSE had seized most of the city by noon, with the last defenders surrendering the following day. Following their victory at Kalavryta, DSE seized large amounts of food and military equipment. However, disagreements among DSE's commanding officers and underdeveloped logistics caused it to narrowly avoid encirclement, losing the spoils of the battle in the process. The Battle of Kalavryta was among DSE's most significant victories in the Peloponnese front.

== Background ==
During the Axis occupation of Greece, the EAM-ELAS resistance movement, led by the Communist Party of Greece, emerged as the dominant movement of the Greek Resistance. At the time of Greece's liberation in October 1944, EAM-ELAS dominated the country except for the major cities, especially Athens, where British forces supported the returned Greek government in exile. The rivalry between the British-backed government and EAM-ELAS resulted in the Dekemvriana clashes in Athens (December 1944 – January 1945). EAM-ELAS was defeated and had to accept its disarmament in the Treaty of Varkiza (February 1945).

With EAM-ELAS neutralized, its members became easy prey for persecution by various right-wing groups in retaliation for the preceding "Red Terror". Former ELAS partisans and leftist sympathizers reacted by establishing self-defense militias, known as Groups of Democratic Armed Persecuted Fighters (ODEKA). The Communist Party of Greece began preparations for an armed confrontation with the Greek government in April 1946. By the end of the year, the communist party had established a rival government known as the Provisional Democratic Government, with the Democratic Army of Greece (DSE) acting as its army; while the conflict had escalated into a large-scale insurgency.

At the beginning of 1948, DSE controlled all of Peloponnese's main mountain ranges including Taygetus, Parnon and Mainalo. While DSE held most of the mountainous Kalavryta province, its capital of the same name remained in government hands. Kalavryta held a strategic position in the triangle of Patras, Tripoli and the peninsula's northern coast. DSE saw Kalavryta as an important target due to its relative isolation from other state garrisons, the abundance of food, clothing and military equipment held in its warehouses as well as the potential of openly recruiting the residents of numerous left leaning villages surrounding it. DSE was also hoping to gain a foothold on the Gulf of Corinth in order to open a new supply route from Central Greece. Following two successful ambushes at Vaggos and Tropaia on 3 and 9 March respectively, DSE destroyed four government companies and recruited approximately 95 captured government soldiers. The success of those operations along with the possibility of being sent to the Makronisos prison camp boosted the number of young volunteers to DSE from among Peloponnese's rural population.

== Prelude ==
The chief of staff of the DSE of Peloponnese, Kostas Kanellopoulos and the head of DSE's Argolidocorinthia Command, Manolis Stathakis began planning the assault on Kalavryta on 25 March. DSE's Achaea Command head Kostas Basakidis was not involved in the planning and transferred most of his forces to the border with Ileia in a deliberate maneuver designed to confuse the government. DSE possessed excellent intelligence on the Kalavryta region's geological features as well as the strength and disposition of government troops. Information was drawn from personnel native to the area and underground communist party cells in the city.

The city's garrison consisted of approximately 700 personnel belonging the 21st National Guard Battalion under Lieutenant Colonel Nikolaos Arvanitakis, an 80-man Hellenic Gendarmerie unit and 100 MAY militiamen. The 1st, 3rd, and the headquarters companies of the National Guard Battalion, as well as 20 gendarmes, had occupied various houses in the center of the city. The 4th company, 60 gendarmes and 100 MAY militia defended the village of Kertezi south–west of the city. The 2nd company entrenched itself at the Mega Spilaio monastery, which overlooked the road to Aigio north–east of the city. The perimeter of the city was protected by five fortified positions: Kastro, the power station, Agia Aikaterini, the Kalavryta railway station and the Katsini residence; which were reinforced by barbed wire and booby traps. The garrison's headquarters were located in the gendarmerie building positioned in the center of the defensive line, some 300–500 metres (980–1,640 ft) from the closest fortified position. The highest buildings in the vicinity such as the Agricultural Bank were manned by small sniper teams. DSE's force numbered some 1,000 to 1,100 fighters headed by DSE of Peloponnese commander in chief Stephanos Giouzelis. The force consisted of 300 men from Aristos Kamarinos' 2nd Taygetus Battalion, 180 from Dimitris Giannakouras' 1st Mainalos Battalion, two companies from Helmos-Corinthia under Manolis Stathakis, one company from Erymanthos and the Peloponnese Headquarters Company.

On 8 April, the bulk of DSE's forces set off from Mainalos towards Kalavryta, reaching Helmos on the dawn of the following day. The communists took quarters in the villages of Platyntero, Mazi and Haliki, while awaiting the rest of the troops to congregate in the area. The final plan of the assault was laid out by Stephanos Giouzelis on the night of 10 April. According to the plan the 1st Mainalos Battalion was to strike Kastro, the power station, and Agia Aikaterini. The attack would draw reinforcements from the railway station and the Katsini residence, which would make them vulnerable, allowing the Democratic Army to penetrate into the city center from those two directions. The 2nd Taygetus Battalion would blockade Kertezi, while Mega Spilaio would be targeted by the Corinthian units. The bridge across River Ladon and the bridges forming part of the Diakopto–Kalavryta railway were mined, to prevent government reinforcements from Aigio. An ambush was set at Vlacherna in order to delay the advance of the Hellenic Army's 72nd Brigade based in Tripoli should it attempt to assist the defenders. Telephone lines were to be cut shortly before the offensive. Due to the need for a large rearguard, the attacking troops were outnumbered by the defenders.

== Battle ==
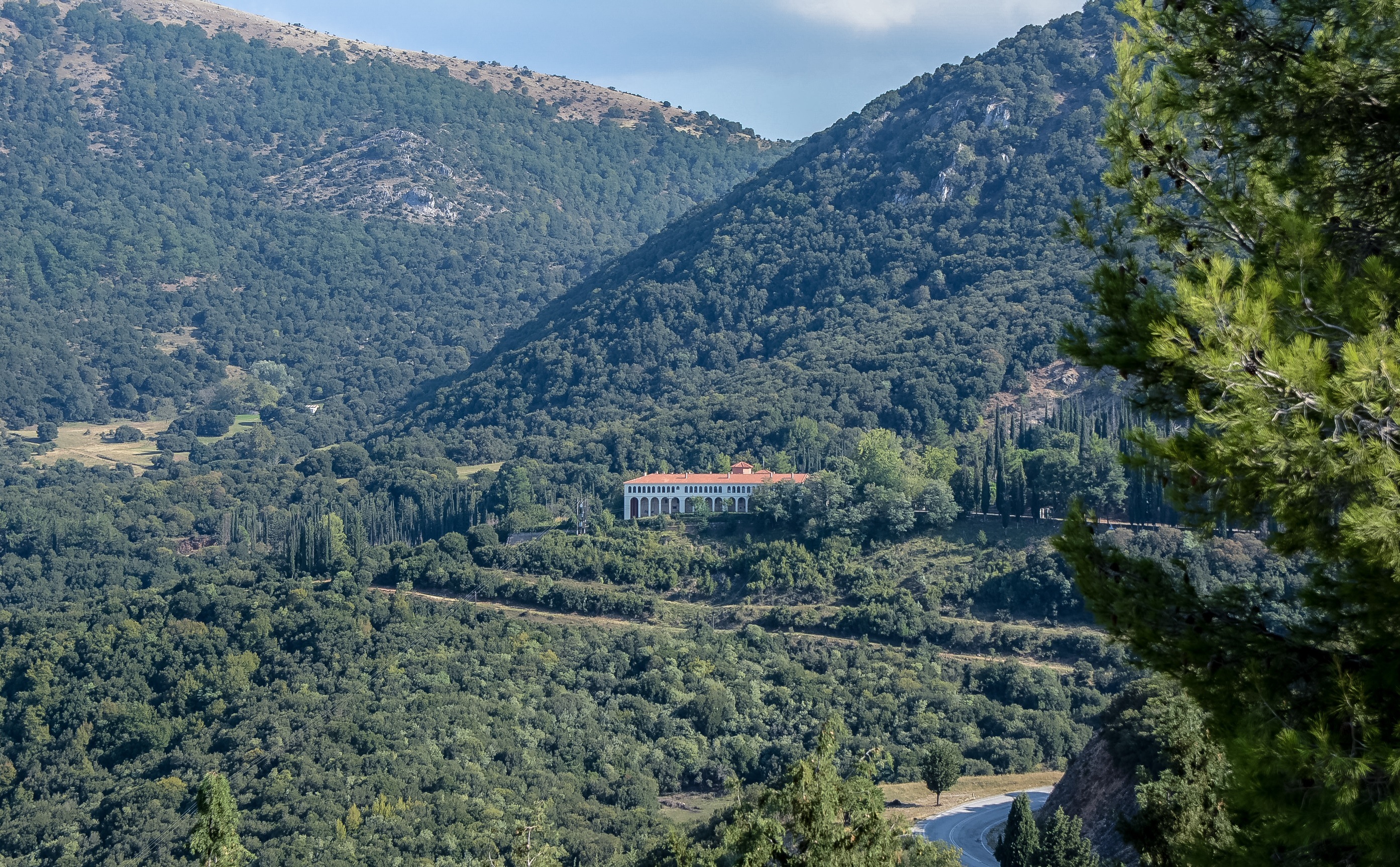
View of the Agia Lavra monastery

The battle began at 4:30 a.m., on 11 April 1948. A specially trained detachment of DSE snipers and saboteurs had entered the city center undetected, attacking simultaneously with the forces situated outside the city. They employed grenades and improvised explosives to quickly overtake machine gun positions. The defenders of Agia Aikaterini were taken by surprise and the position fell half an hour later. Mega Spilaio was seized at 6:30 a.m., the surviving soldiers of the 2nd company fled to Diakopto, where another army company was being held at bay by a DSE ambush. By 8:00 a.m., the communists had taken over the power station and the Oikia residence, encircling the Kalavryta garrison's headquarters and the gendarmerie building. At 9:00 a.m., planes belonging to the Royal Hellenic Air Force flew over the city, failing to intervene due to the high risk of friendly fire. The largest fortified positions, the railway station and Kastro, fell by noon. The defenders who retreated from the outer defensive line, continued to offer determined resistance after taking up positions in private residences. The 2nd Taygetus Battalion had entered the Agia Lavra monastery during the early morning hours of the day, seizing its abbot, who provided Kamarinos with crucial information which enabled him to set up an ambush. When the units stationed at Kertezi moved towards Kalavryta they were enfiladed by heavy machine gun fire from the Agia Lavra height, breaking ranks and fleeing towards Chalandritsa.

At 6:30 p.m., the gendarmerie headquarters, which was housing 17 imprisoned leftists, caught fire after it was targeted with incendiary rounds. One of the gendarmes proposed for the prisoners to be shot, however Arvanitakis forbade their execution. The gendarmes retreated to the trenches behind the building and then tο the nearby gendarmerie outposts. DSE fighters rescued the prisoners before the building was completely consumed by flames. By the end of the day, the government forces were confined to the two gendarmerie outposts. Arvanitakis appealed for reinforcements from Mega Spilaio, Kertezi, Tripoli and Patras; yet none arrived. During the night DSE fighters withdrew from the town to the heights surrounding it, due to security concerns. The gendarmes abandoned the city during the night, managing to evade hostile patrols undetected and reach Diakopto dozens of kilometers from Kalavryta. Arvanitakis did not attempt to escape, either because he was expecting the arrival of reinforcements or because he believed that DSE had abandoned the area. In the morning of 12 April, DSE returned to Kalavryta, most of the force began looting the local warehouses while other fighters once again surrounded the national guard headquarters. At noon, on 12 April, Arvanitakis and Kanellopoulos, who knew each other from their days at the Hellenic Military Academy, negotiated a surrender whereby six officers surrendered to DSE. Arvanitakis then killed himself with his personal revolver.

DSE casualties numbered between 10 and 27 killed, and 25 to 40 wounded. Government troops lost 44 to 50 soldiers and officers killed and 160 to 300 soldiers taken prisoner, of whom a small number opted to defect. DSE seized the Kalavryta national guard and United Nations Relief and Rehabilitation Administration warehouses. They took four heavy mortars, four Vickers machine guns, 80 submachine guns (MP 40s and Thompsons), 200 rifles, 85,000 rounds of ammunition, 130 mortar shells, mines, radios, military uniforms and other equipment. The communists also confiscated 430 million drachmas, 200 sheep and goats, 10,000 okades of flour and 1,000 okades of sugar. The spoils were loaded onto pack animals and taken to Platyntero where they were split between the units involved in the engagement. The food that DSE was unable to carry was distributed to the local population. On 13 April, government forces entered Kalavryta without encountering any resistance.

== Aftermath ==
While the initial plan developed by Kanellopoulos envisioned that DSE's units would retreat to their respective hideouts, Giouzelis insisted on a joint offensive against Goura. Giouzelis argued that government troops would not risk fighting in the woodlands surrounding the village. The Greek Army's 72nd Brigade exploited this hesitation, moving in to encircle Helmos before this maneuver could be executed, forcing DSE to conduct a fighting retreat through Arbouna. DSE force was too small and lacked the logistical capabilities to transport the captured equipment to its bases, as at least 220 pack animals along with a number of trained muleteers were required to carry the sugar and floor alone. Most of the seized weapons and ammunition were hidden in a cache between Mazi and Platyntero which was discovered by the state troops. Seven heavily injured DSE fighters were left in a cave in Helmos; they were likewise discovered by a government patrol and summarily executed. On 15 April, government authorities executed 25 political prisoners in Sparta as a reprisal for the Kalavryta attack.

The outcome of the operation was discussed at a DSE conference at Agia Varvara on 16 April. The loss of the captured equipment became a point of contention, with Kanellopoulos arguing that it could have been smuggled to Arcadia had Giouzelis followed his plan. DSE's officers were split on the issue. Those siding with Kanellopoulos questioned the decision to entrust Giouzelis with leadership of the DSE in the Peloponnese. They believed that professional military officers like Kanellopoulos were sidelined in favor of a former political functionaries. To the contrary, Giouzelis' supporters believed that the cancelled Goura offensive would have been a turning point for the entire Peloponnese campaign. The fall of Kalavryta, along with the Battle of Chalandritsa which took place on 5 July, were among DSE's most significant victories in the Peloponnese. These victories, along with the terror tactics used by government paramilitaries, convinced a significant proportion of the peninsula's population that the communist Provisional Democratic Government was a viable alternative to the state.

By November 1948, the strength of DSE units in the Peloponnese had grown to 4,870 combatants, through a series of successful recruiting drives. Yet it continued to suffer serious shortages in ammunition and other materiel since the government forces had thwarted three of its attempts to receive supplies by sea. The Greek Army judged DSE's Peloponnese Division to be its weakest and went on to develop plans for its destruction under the codename Operation Peristera. Having achieved an approximately ten-fold superiority in numbers, the army adopted the concept of total war, depriving the rebels of their support base through mass arrests, while conducting parallel large-scale clearance operations. Operation Peristera was launched in December 1948, and by March 1949 it had achieved the total destruction of DSE forces in the region.

== Sources ==
- Kamarinos, Aristos (2015). Ο εμφύλιος πόλεμος στη Πελοπόννησο 1946–1949 [The Civil War in the Peloponnese (1946–1949)] (in Greek). Athens: Syghroni Epoxi. ISBN 9789602248720.
- Lefas, Giannis (1998). Ο Δημοκρατικός Στρατός Πελοποννήσου (Δημιουργία - Ανάπτυξη - Ήττα) [The Democratic Army of the Peloponnese (Foundation-Development-Defeat)] (in Greek). Vol. I. Athens: Alfeios. ISBN 9608551994.
- Margaritis, Giorgos (2005). Ιστορία του ελληνικού εμφυλίου πολέμου 1946-1949 [History of the Greek Civil War 1946-1949] (in Greek). Vol. I. Athens: Vivliorama. ISBN 9608087120.
- Margaritis, Giorgos (2006). Ιστορία του ελληνικού εμφυλίου πολέμου 1946-1949 [History of the Greek Civil War 1946-1949] (in Greek). Vol. II. Athens: Vivliorama. ISBN 9608087139.
- Papakonstantinou, Konstantinos (2002). Η νεκρή Μεραρχία [The Dead Division] (in Greek). Vol. I. Athens: Alfeios.
- Rajak, Svetoslav (2010). "The Cold War in the Balkans, 1945–1956". In Leffler, Melvyn P.; Westad, Odd Arne (eds.). The Cambridge History of the Cold War, Volume I. Cambridge University Press. pp. 198–220. ISBN 978-0521837194.
- Stouras, Panagiotis (2016). The Greek Civil War in the Aegialia and Kalavryta Area (1946–1949) (PhD thesis) (in Greek). University of Johannesburg. pp. 1–513. hdl:10210/227069.
