= Anagnostopoulos =

Anagnostopoulos (Greek: Αναγνωστόπουλος) is a Greek surname meaning "son of Anagnostis". The genitive case is Anagnostopoulou (Αναγνωστοπούλου) meaning daughter or son of Anagnostopoulos. It may refer to these people:

- Spiro Agnew (Spiro Anagnostopoulos), American politician and the 39th vice president of the United States
- Panagiotis Anagnostopoulos (c. 1790–1854), Greek revolutionary leader
- Panagiotis Anagnostopoulos (general) (1914–?), Greek general and politician
- Sia Anagnostopoulou (born 1959), Greek politician
- Dimitris Anagnostopoulos (born 1970), Greek chess Grandmaster
- Chrysoula Anagnostopoulou (born 1991), Greek discus thrower
- Ioanna Anagnostopoulou (born 1997), Greek gymnast
