= Fotilas =

Fotilas (Greek: Φωτήλας) is a Greek surname. Notable people with the surname include:

- Asimakis Fotilas (1761–1835), Greek politician and revolutionary leader
- Panagiotakis Fotilas (died 1824), Greek politician and revolutionary leader
