= Battle of Kastraki =

1826 battle of the Greek War of Independence

- Part of the Greek War of Independence
Date	5 May 1826
Location	Kalavryta Province, Morea Eyalet, Ottoman Empire 38°02′40″N 22°11′12″E
Result	Ottoman victory

Belligerents
Greek revolutionaries	Ottoman Empire

Commanders and leaders
Golfinos Petimezas; Nikolaos Soliotis; Spilios Rodopoulos or Spiliotakis	Ibrahim Pasha of Egypt

Strength
Irregular army	20,000 infantry and cavalry

Casualties and losses
Over 1,500 killed and wounded	20 killed, 15 captured

The Battle of Kastraki was a battle of the Greek War of Independence that took place in Kalavryta in 1826 between the Greek revolutionaries and the army of Ibrahim Pasha.

Kastraki is a fortified location on Helmos near the village of Solos in Achaea. In 1826, Ibrahim Pasha, after the fall of Missolonghi, passed through the Peloponnese and Patras and headed for Tripoli; on the way he plundered the villages he encountered and enslaved the inhabitants.

Arriving at Kalavritochoria, he found it deserted by residents, since they had fled to Kastraki, as had the monks of Agia Lavra and the city of Kalavryta. According to Photakos 2000, another 5,500 civilians were fortified in Kastraki, while Trikoupis speaks of 5,000.

The battle began on the morning of May 5th with the first attack being repelled by the Greeks; the second, however, under the leadership of Ibrahim himself, succeeded in breaking the Greek lines and pushing them back. The losses were heavy for the defenders: about 400 dead, 500 fallen off the cliff or buried in the snow, and about 1000 prisoners. About 200 women with their babies in their arms fell off the cliff to escape captivity. The battle did not continue because Nikolaos Petimezas tricked the attackers into thinking that reinforcements were coming, and Ibrahim withdrew to Kalavryta. Among the prisoners were the wife, sister and son of Nikolaos Soliotis.
