= Makelaria Monastery =

Orthodox monastery in the Peloponnese, Greece

- Ιερά Μονή Κοιμήσεως Θεοτόκου Μακελαριάς
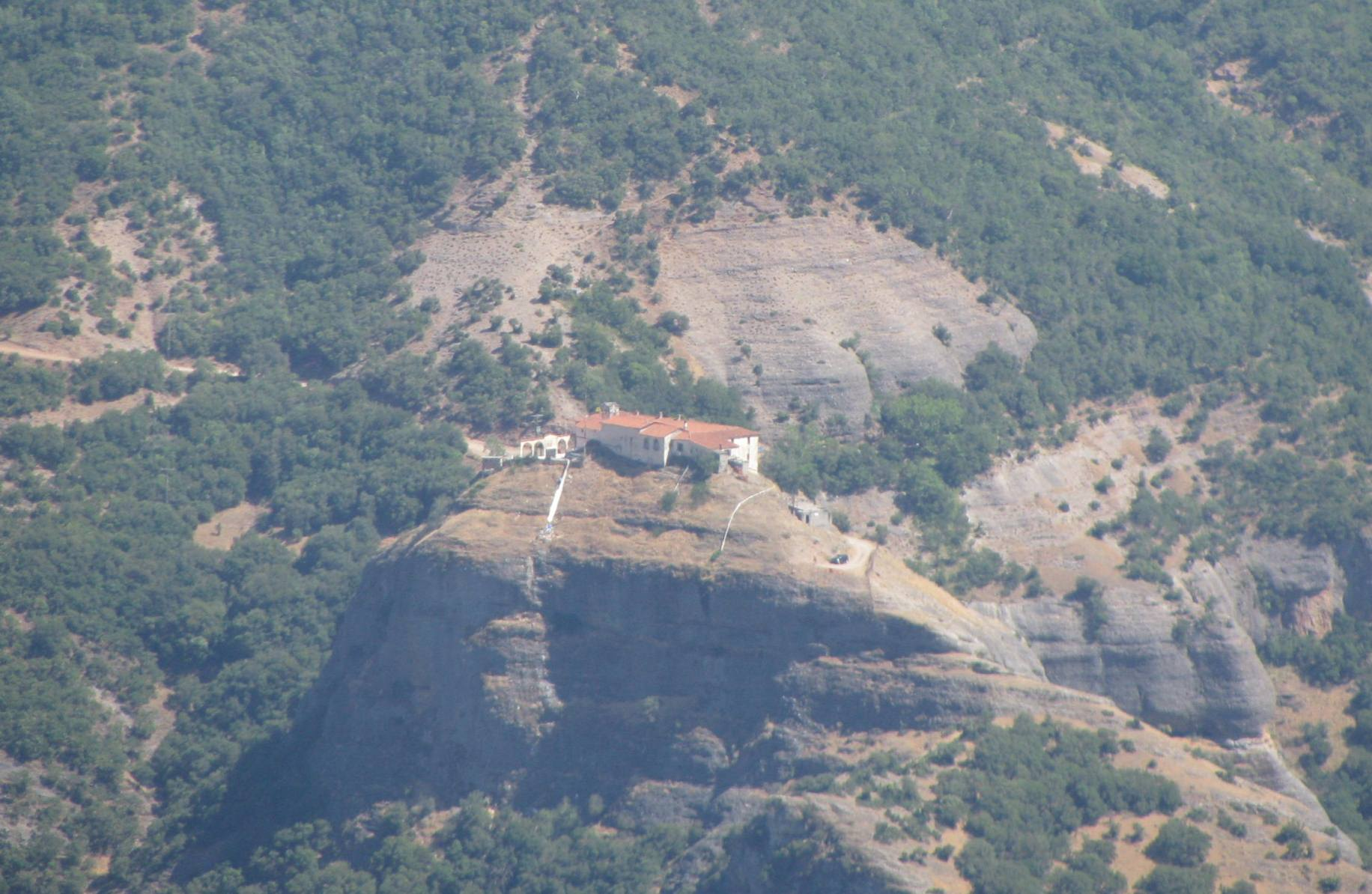
- An aerial view of the monastery

- Location of the monastery in Greece
- Interactive map of Makelaria Monastery

Monastery information
- Other name: Meteora of the Peloponnese
- Order: Ecumenical Patriarchate of Constantinople
- Denomination: Eastern Orthodox Church
- Established: 532
- Dedication: Dormition of the Theotokos

People
- Founder: Belisarius

Architecture
- Status: Monastery
- Functional status: Active
- Style: Byzantine

Site
- Location: Lapanagoi, Peloponnese
- Country: Greece
- Coordinates: 38°05′55″N 21°58′52″E

The Makelaria Monastery (Greek: Ιερά Μονή Κοιμήσεως Θεοτόκου Μακελαριάς) is a 6th-century Eastern Orthodox monastery located in the Peloponnese region of Greece. It lies on a big rock near the village of Lapanagoi, approximately 30 kilometres (19 mi) from the town of Kalavryta. The monastery, one of the oldest in Greece, was founded in 532 AD and is dedicated to the Dormition of the Theotokos.

According to tradition, it was built by the Byzantine general Belisarius, under Emperor Justinian the Great, as an act of repentance after the Nika Revolt in Constantinople.

The monastery is renowned for its miraculous icon of the Virgin Mary, its deep roots in Greek history, and its breathtaking position often called the “Meteora of the Peloponnese.”

== See also ==
- List of monasteries in Greece
