= Panagiotis Anagnostopoulos =

Panagiotis Anagnostopoulos may refer to:

- Panagiotis Anagnostopoulos (general)
- Panagiotis Anagnostopoulos (revolutionary)
