= Ioannis Oikonomou =

Greek painter, xylographer, and athlete

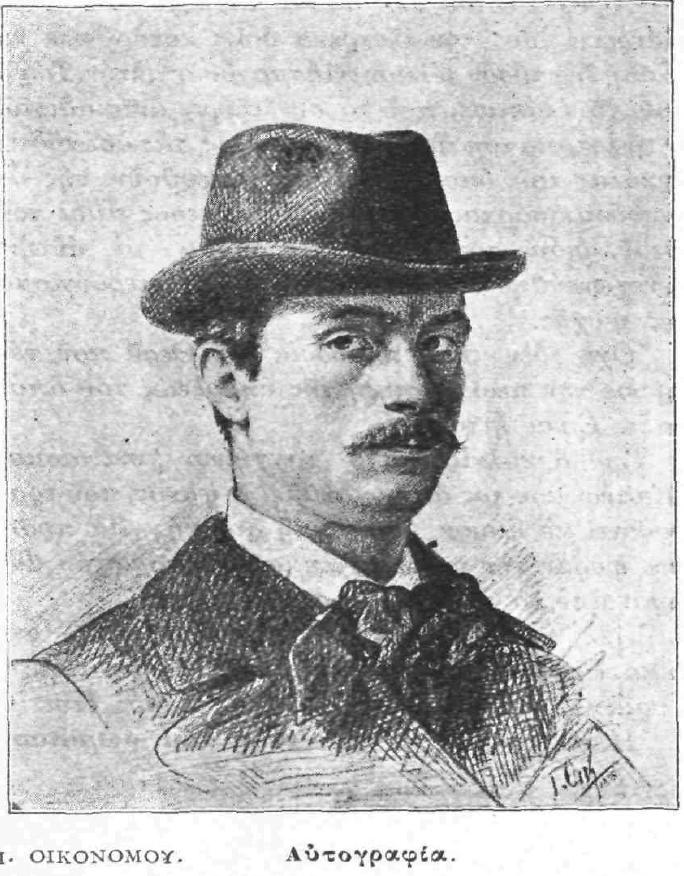
Ioannis Oikonomou; from Pinakothiki magazine (1902)

Ioannis Oikonomou (Greek: Ιωάννης Οικονόμου; 1860 in Kertezi – 1931 in Athens) was a Greek painter, xylographer, engraver and amateur athlete.

== Biography ==
From 1874 to 1880, he studied at the Athens School of Fine Arts with Nikiforos Lytras and initially focused on landscapes and cityscapes, which are largely of historical interest. At this time, he also worked on frescoes at Christokopidi Church and became a teacher at a technical school.

His first exhibition came in 1875 at the Zappas Olympics, which included art and music competitions as well as the athletic events. At the games of 1888–89, he participated in the opening exhibitions at the Zappeion. He also entered some of the athletic competitions, taking second place in the discus throw and third place on parallel bars.

During this time, he also began working as an illustrator for the magazines Εστία ("Hearth" or "Home") and Ποικίλη Στοά (roughly, "Variety"). He continued to exhibit frequently, although he limited himself largely to Athens and the surrounding areas. Today his works are on display at the National Gallery of Greece, Evangelos Averoff Gallery and the Municipal Museum of Larissa.

A street is named after him in the Nea Smyrni district of Athens.

== Selected works ==
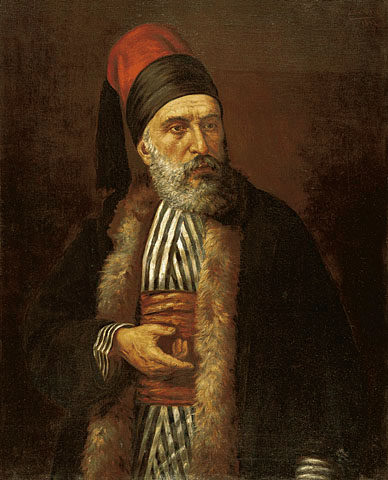
Portrait of Asimakis Fotilas

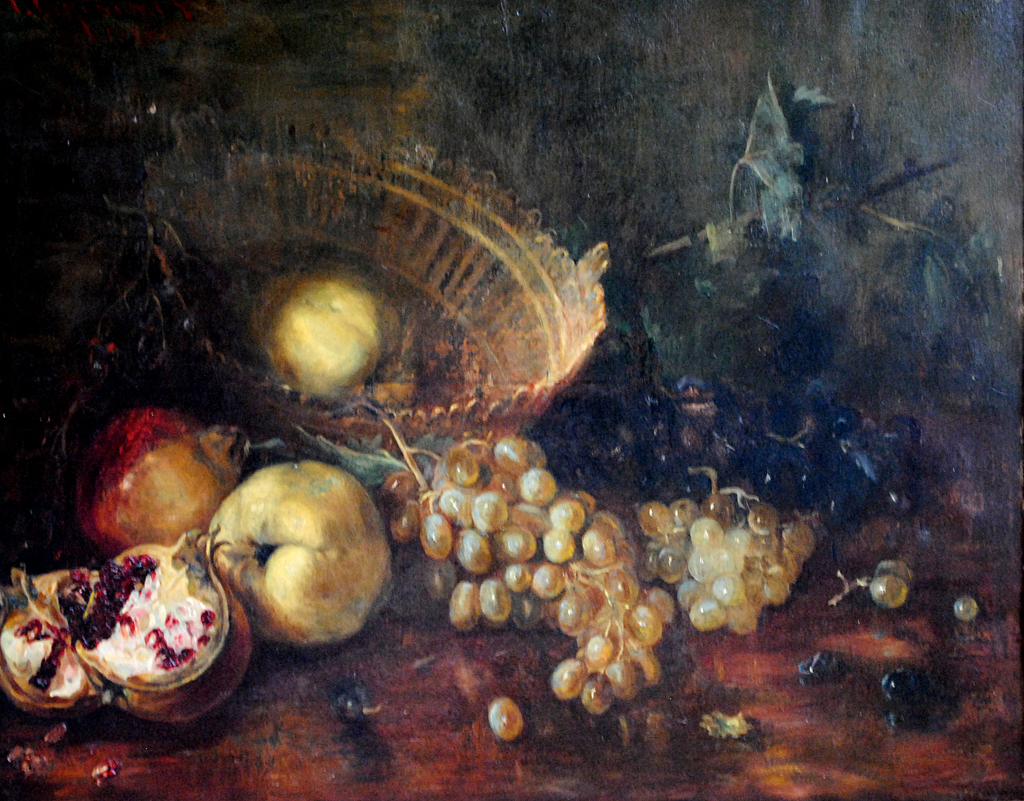
Still-life with Fruit

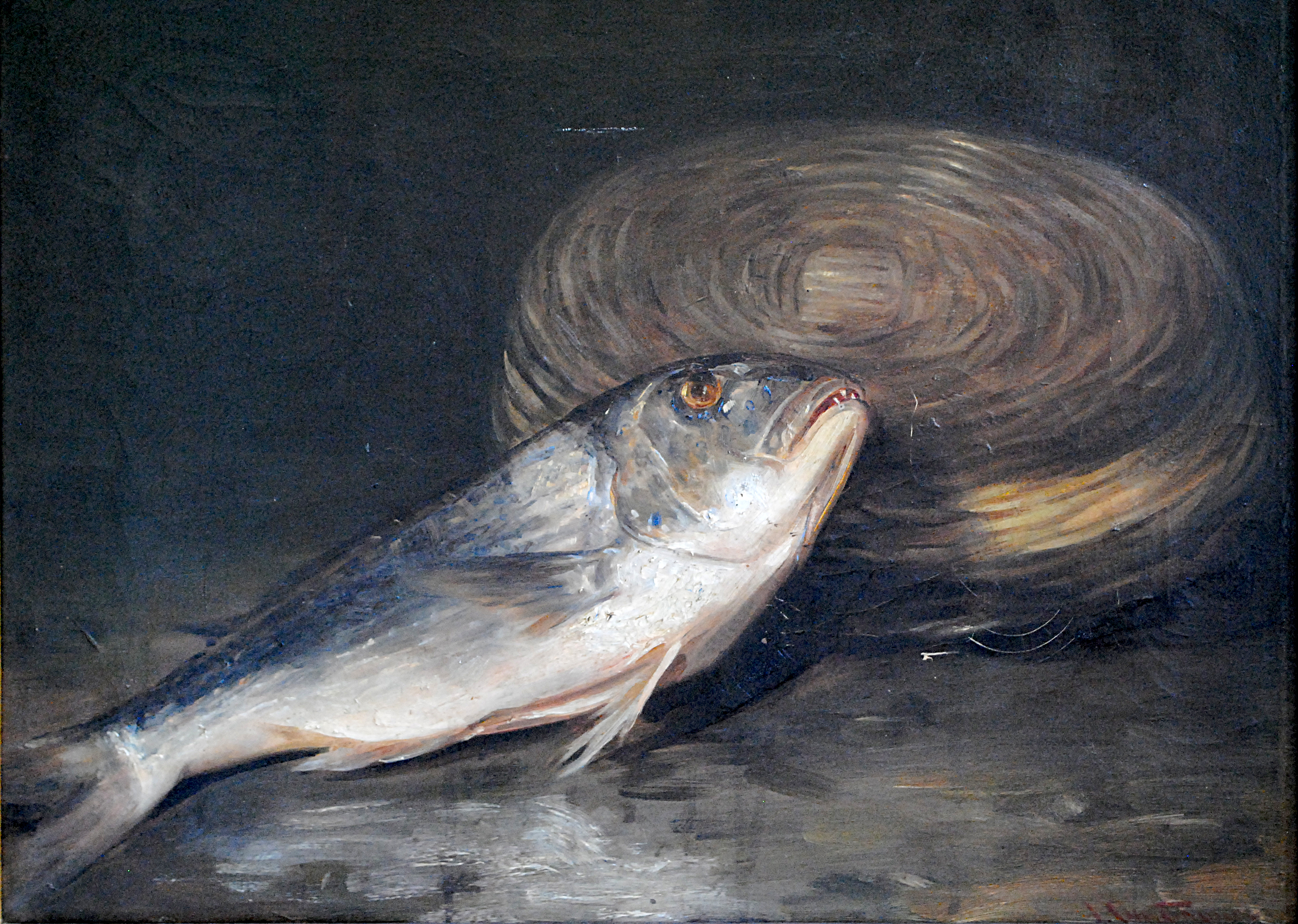
still-life with Fish

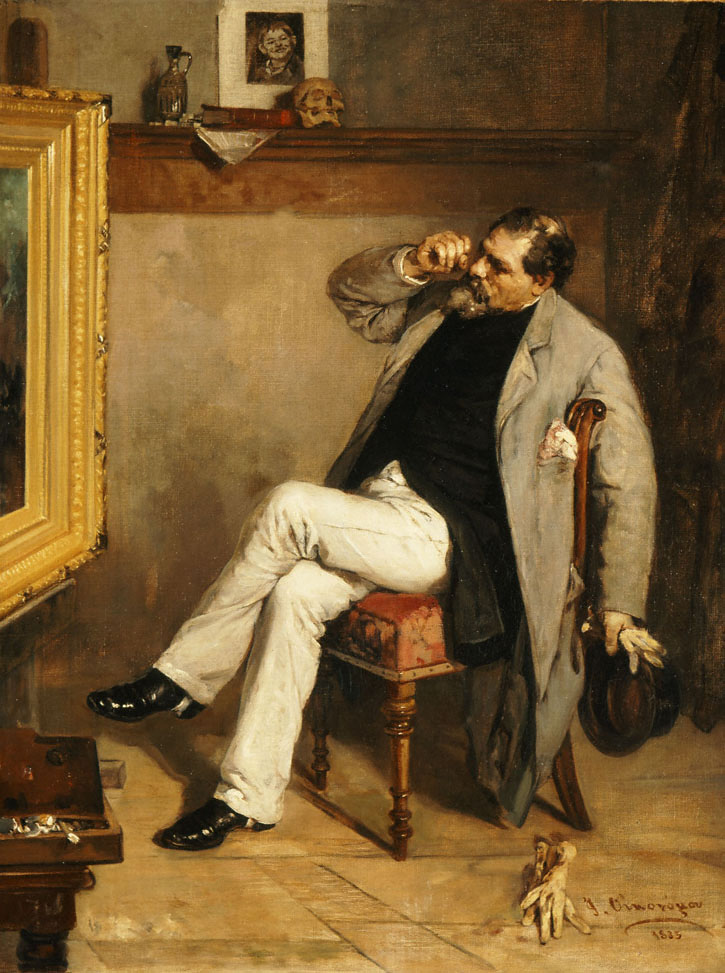
The Art Critic
