= Germanos Zapheiropoulos =

Eastern Orthodox bishop

- Γερμανός Ζαφειρόπουλος
- Born: 1760
- Died: 1821 (aged 60–61)
- Occupation: Priest
- Honours: Member of the Filiki Eteria

Germanos Zapheiropoulos (Greek: Γερμανός Ζαφειρόπουλος; 1760–1821) was a Greek priest and bishop, who helped prepare the Greek War of Independence in the Peloponnese.

== Biography ==
He was born in the village of Mesorrougi of the province of Kalavryta in 1760. His secular name was George. He originated from a wealthy family, with ancestors from Constantinople. His father's name was Zafeiris Zafeiropoulos and his mother's was Efstathia. He was a cousin of the protosynkellos and historian Amvrosios Frantzis. The Ottomans killed his father when he was very young. At the age of nine he entered as a novice in Mega Spilaio monastery, later becoming a monk and being given the name Germanos. He was later ordained a deacon and a presbyter.

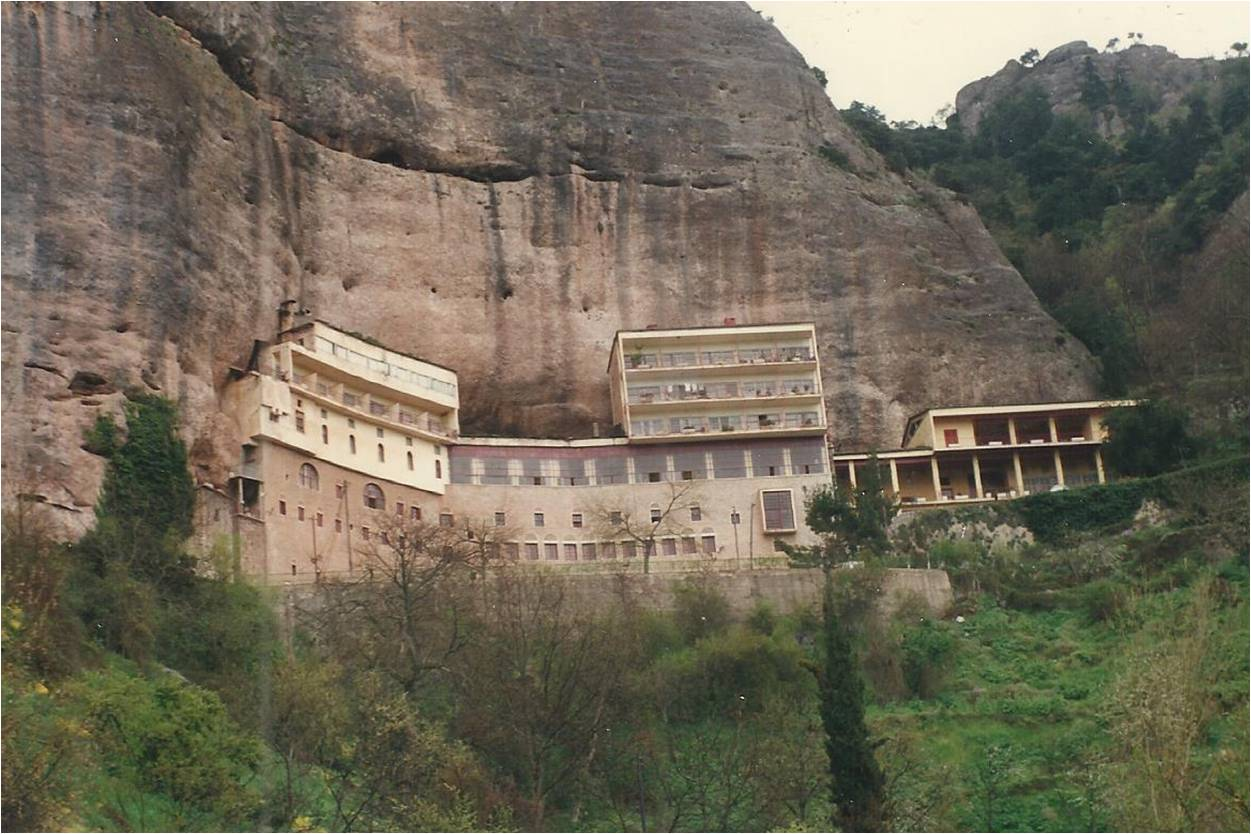
Monastery of Mega Spilaion

At around 1800 he found himself in Thessaloniki where he worked for two years as a teacher. He later went to Belgrade where he worked as a teacher while promoting the Greek uprising. The Ottoman authorities expelled him from the city and, subsequently, he went to the Danubian Principalities. He remained there for two years where he learnt the Aromanian language. In the end, he was also expelled from there by the Turkish authorities due to his nationalistic action. He returned to Mega Spilaio and, subsequently, departed for pilgrimage to Jerusalem. At a later date, he travelled to Constantinople, where he was already known for his wisdom. The Holy Synod of the Patriarchate first elected him Bishop of Sebasteia and later, under Patriarch Gregory V (1806–1808), in March 1807, elected him successor of Germanos of Christianopolis (1793–1807).

Because of his fame, Alexander Ypsilantis appointed him as one of the 4-5 registrars of the Filiki Eteria, where he had been initiated since 1818. He participated in the convention of Vostitsa, disagreeing with Papaflessas' confinement and promoting arguments against it. During the fundraiser that took place, he donated 2000 grosia (topical currency at the time). The Turkish authorities gradually became suspicious of the Peloponnesian archbishops’ actions, leading them to conduct an array of arrests. In order to proceed with their plan, they summoned the archbishops to a fraudulent meeting in Tripolitsa. Germanos was amongst those arrested, reaching the city on March 8, having left Kyparissia on March 5. He died as a result of the hardships of his captivity on September 21, 1821.

== Sources ==
- Atesis, Vasilios (1971). «Εθνομάρτυρες αρχιερείς της Εκκλησίας της Ελλάδος από του 1821-1869». Θεολογία 42: 1–29.
- Veis, Nikos (1939). «Γερμανού Μητροπολίτου Χριστιανουπόλεως γράμμα προς τους ιερείς της επαρχίας αυτού». Πρακτικά της Χριστιανικής Αρχαιολογικής Εταιρείας των ετών 1936-1938 (Εν Αθήναις) περίοδος 3η, 4: 118–125.
