= Asimaki =

Asimaki is a surname. Notable people with the surname include:

- Alexandra Asimaki (born 1988), Greek water polo player
- Asimakis Fotilas (1761–1835), Greek politician and revolutionary leader
