= John of Durnay =

- Baron of Gritzena
- Reign: 1283/89 – after 1292
- Predecessor: Geoffrey of Durnay
- Successor: unknown
- Died: after 1292

John of Durnay (French: Jean de Durnay) was the Baron of Gritzena in the Principality of Achaea in the late 1280s and early 1290s.

The family's original possession, the Barony of Kalavryta, had been lost to the Byzantines in the 1260s or early 1270s. According to Antoine Bon, John's father, Geoffrey of Durnay, received the Barony of Gritzena in compensation. John succeeded his father as lord of Gritzena (and titular baron of Kalavryta) some time after 1283. In 1289/90, he appears, along with John Chauderon, as one of the principal aides of the new Prince of Achaea, Florent of Hainaut, in his efforts to re-establish proper administration and internal peace in the principality.

In 1292, following a series of destructive raids in the Greek and Latin-held islands of the Aegean Sea, the Aragonese admiral Roger of Lauria led his fleet to anchor at Navarino. With Prince Florent absent in Italy, the local castellan, George I Ghisi, assembled two hundred knights, at Androusa to oppose any Aragonese attempt at plunder or the capture of lands in Achaea. A brief but bloody combat ensued, in which Roger and John, "the finest and bravest gentleman in all the Morea", according to the Chronicle of the Morea, charged each other with such force that their lances splintered and both were unhorsed. In the end, the Achaeans were defeated and George Ghisi and John of Durnay taken prisoner, John being saved from death by the Aragonese foot soldiers only through the intervention by Roger of Lauria himself. They were released shortly after when the Aragonese fleet sailed to Glarentsa and Princess Isabella of Villehardouin paid the Aragonese 4,000 hyperpyra as ransom.

The line of the Durnays and the barony of Gritzena disappear thereafter from record. John's wife, whose name is unknown, was the daughter of Richard I Orsini, Count of Cephalonia. It is unknown if they had any offspring.

== Sources ==
- Bon, Antoine (1969). La Morée franque. Recherches historiques, topographiques et archéologiques sur la principauté d'Achaïe [The Frankish Morea. Historical, Topographic and Archaeological Studies on the Principality of Achaea] (in French). Paris: De Boccard.
- Miller, William (1908). The Latins in the Levant: A History of Frankish Greece (1204–1566). London: John Murray.

Preceded by Geoffrey of Durnay	Baron of Gritzena; 1283/89 – after 1292	Unknown
