= Anagnostis Striftombolas =

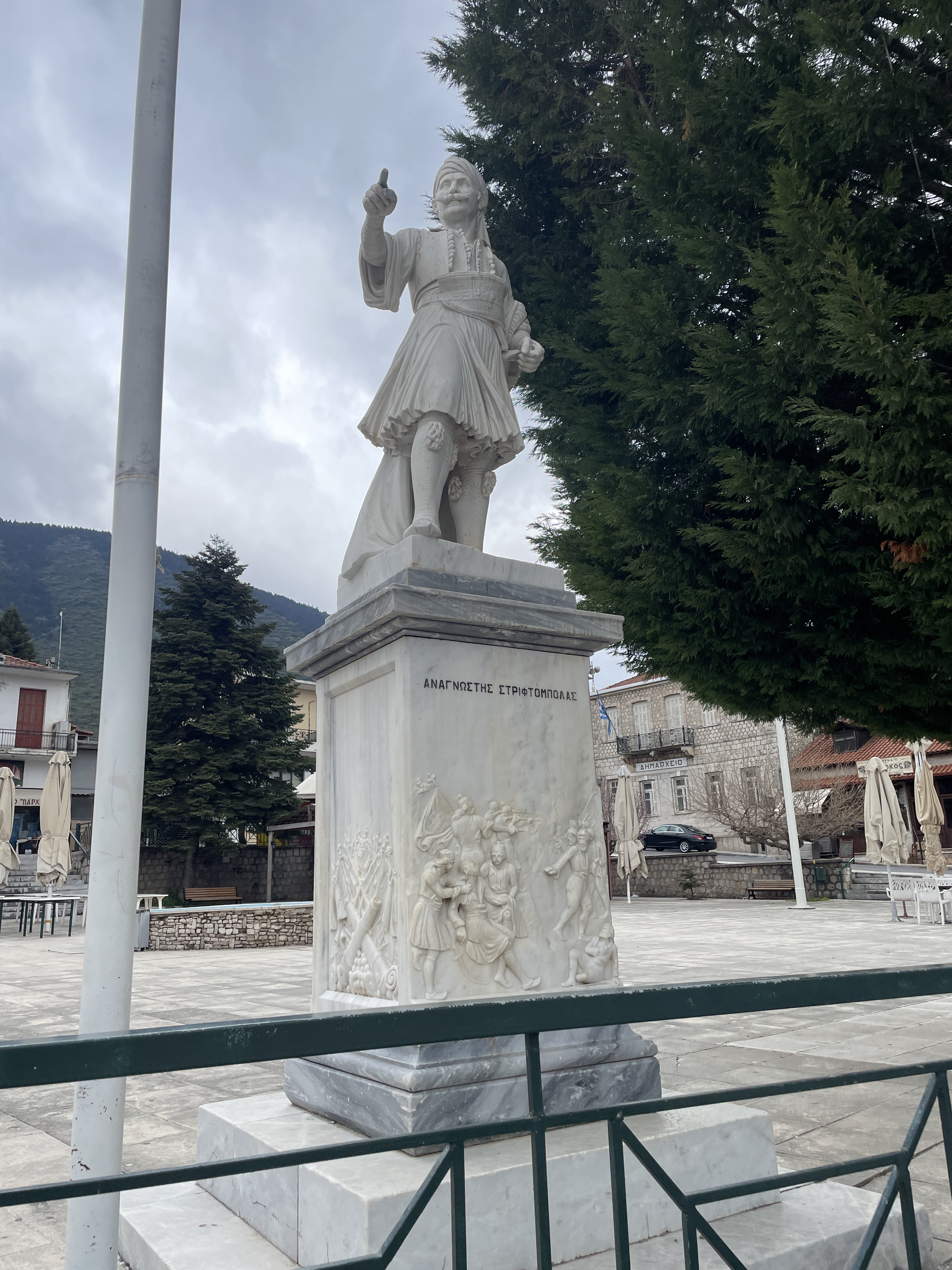
- Statue of Anagnostis Striftombolas in Levidi
- Born: c. 1778; Kertezi, Achaea, Ottoman Empire (now Greece)
- Died: 14 April 1821; Levidi, Ottoman Empire (now Greece)
- Occupation: Greek revolutionary leader

Anagnostis Striftombolas (Greek: Αναγνώστης Στριφτόμπολας; c. 1778–1821) was a Greek revolutionary leader.

== Biography ==
He was born in about 1778 in Kertezi, Achaea, and was descended from Mesorrougi, Achaea. He was a schoolmaster in Tripolitsa in 1800, he was educated with children's notes and learned the art of war especially on knowing how to use a knife. He was an irreconcilable enemy of the Turks and continuously to quarrel with them, one day, he killed a Turk. Movably, he fled to Zakynthos (then Zante) where he was enrolled into the British Army. He returned to Tripolitsa in 1818 as a bodyguard of Asimakis Fotilas, he became ill and Fotilas which he asked and once again returned to Zakynthos. He returned to the same city for the second time and exercised vocationally with a watchmaker but not for a long time. He went to Kertezi near Kalavryta, formed a strategic body of 15 men and battled at Levidi where he was killed on 14 April 1821.

== Sources ==
- Peloponisii agonistes tou 1821, Nikitara apomnimonevmata (Πελοποννήσιοι αγωνιστές του 1821, Νικηταρά απομνημονεύματα = Peloponnesian Revolutionary Leaders in 1821, Nikitaras Remembered), Fotakos, Vergina publishers, Athens 1996
- This article is translated and is based from the article at the Greek Wikipedia (el:Main Page)
