= Barony of Kalavryta =

European polity

- Barony of the Principality of Achaea
- 1209–1270s
- Map of the Peloponnese with its principal locations during the late Middle Ages
- Capital: Kalavryta
- Area
  - Coordinates: 38°2′N 22°7′E
  - Type: Feudal lordship
- Historical era: Middle Ages
  - Established: 1209
  - Byzantine reconquest: 10 March 1270
Succeeded by
Despotate of the Morea

The Barony of Kalavryta was a medieval Frankish fiefdom of the Principality of Achaea, located in the Peloponnese peninsula in Greece, centred on the town of Kalavryta (Greek: Καλάβρυτα; French: La Colo[u]vrate).

== History ==
The Barony of Kalavryta was established ca. 1209, after the conquest of the Peloponnese by the Crusaders, and was one of the original twelve secular baronies within the Principality of Achaea. The Chronicle of the Morea mentions that the barony, centred on the mountain town of Kalavryta, comprised twelve knight's fiefs, with Otho of Durnay as the first baron. In the 1260s, he was succeeded by Geoffrey of Durnay, who is attested as being active as late as 1289. In 1292, his son John is mentioned, but the family disappears thereafter. By that time, the barony had already been lost to the Byzantine Greeks of Mystras. A Venetian document from 1278 seems to indicate that Kalavryta was under Greek control at the time. Antoine Bon suggests that it was captured during the early 1270s, when the Greek offensives broke through the Frankish defences in Arcadia, and not, as Karl Hopf suggests, in the first round of Greek offensives ca. 1264. Geoffrey of Durnay is attested as holding the barony of "La Grite" after 1278, which, according to Bon, is to be identified with the vacant Barony of Gritzena, apparently given to the Durnays as compensation.

Very little is known of the barony's extent or internal history, except that the Premonstratensians had established themselves there.

== Sources ==
- Bon, Antoine (1969). La Morée franque. Recherches historiques, topographiques et archéologiques sur la principauté d'Achaïe [The Frankish Morea. Historical, Topographic and Archaeological Studies on the Principality of Achaea] (in French). Paris: De Boccard. OCLC 869621129.
- Miller, William (1921). Essays on the Latin Orient. Cambridge: Cambridge University Press.
