= Panagiotakis Fotilas =

Greek politician and revolutionary leader

- Born: Kalavryta, Ottoman Empire (now Greece)
- Died: 1824; Greece
- Occupation: Greek revolutionary leader

Panagiotakis Fotilas (Greek: Παναγιωτάκης Φωτήλας; died 1824) was a Greek politician and a revolutionary leader. He was the son of Asimakis.

== Biography ==
Fotilas was born in Kalavryta. On March 19, 1821, he attempted to kill the Turks in Sopoto. He battled in the battle of Lalas and the Siege of Patras.
