= Geoffrey of Durnay =

Geoffrey of Durnay (French: Geoffroi de Durnay) was the Baron of Kalavryta in the Principality of Achaea. He was son of Otho of Durnay, the first Baron of Kalavryta. The Barony of Kalavryta had been lost to the Byzantines in the 1260s or early 1270s. Geoffrey received the Barony of Gritzena in compensation. He was succeeded by his son John of Durnay. Geoffrey also had a daughter, Cassandra of Durnay that married Francis Sanudo.

== Sources ==
- Bon, Antoine (1969). La Morée franque. Recherches historiques, topographiques et archéologiques sur la principauté d'Achaïe [The Frankish Morea. Historical, Topographic and Archaeological Studies on the Principality of Achaea] (in French). Paris: De Boccard. OCLC 869621129.
