= Andreas Panagopoulos =

Greek politician

Andreas Panagopoulos (Greek: Ανδρέας Παναγόπουλος, 1883 - 1952) was a Greek politician and four times mayor of Agrinio, being considered one of the city's most important mayors.

He was born in Agrinio in 1883 and to Anastasis Panagopoulos, a trader whose origin was from Kalavryta. Andreas studied in a private school in Corfu. He became involved in the tobacco industry, and founded the Panagopoulos Bros. firm, one of the most famous tobacco companies in Greece.

He became mayor of the city of Agrinio for three consecutive terms from 1925 to 1934, and again from 1951 to 1952, when he died. He was one of the most important mayors. Among his achievements were the completion of the civic street plan, its electrification, the paving of its roads, the construction of a modern aqueduct in 1930, the building of the Central Municipal market in 1932, and the commencement of archaeological digs to uncover the remains of the ancient city of Agrinion. He also served briefly as an MP in 1935-1936.

A central street in Agrinio, as well as the square in front of the city hall, bear his name. On the same square lies his family's mansion, which has been declared a historic monument.
