= Barony of Gritzena =

Medieval fiefdom in Messenia, Greece

- Barony of the Principality of Achaea
- 1209–late 13th century
- Map of the Peloponnese with its principal locations during the late Middle Ages
- Capital: Gritzena
  - Type: Feudal lordship
- Historical era: Middle Ages
  - Established: 1209
  - Byzantine reconquest: late 13th century
Succeeded by
Despotate of the Morea

The Barony of Gritzena or Gritsena was a medieval Frankish fiefdom of the Principality of Achaea, located in eastern Messenia, in the Peloponnese peninsula in Greece, centred on the settlement of Gritzena (Greek: Γρίτζενα/Γρίτσενα; French: La Grite).

== History ==
The Barony of Gritzena was established c. 1209, after the conquest of the Peloponnese by the Crusaders, and was one of the original twelve secular baronies within the Principality of Achaea. The various versions of the Chronicle of the Morea mention that the barony comprised four knight's fiefs, and was located in the region of Lakkoi (the upper Messenian plain, between Kalamata and Skorta), under a certain Lucas (Λούκας), of whom nothing other than his name is known.

The Barony of Gritzena is little-known. It remained a peaceful backwater until the Byzantine attacks of the 1260s, and there is no evidence of a castle being constructed there; it is hence impossible to establish its exact location. If Antoine Bon's equation of "La Grite" with Gritzea is correct, the barony re-appears only c. 1278, when it was controlled by Geoffrey of Durnay, who had possibly received it as compensation for the loss of his family's Barony of Kalavryta to the Byzantine Greeks of Mystras. It then disappears again from the sources along with the Durnay family, at the end of the 13th century.

== Sources ==
- Bon, Antoine (1969). La Morée franque. Recherches historiques, topographiques et archéologiques sur la principauté d'Achaïe [The Frankish Morea. Historical, Topographic and Archaeological Studies on the Principality of Achaea] (in French). Paris: De Boccard.
- Miller, William (1921). Essays on the Latin Orient. Cambridge: Cambridge University Press.
