= Kalavryta =

Town in Achaea, Greece

Kalavryta Καλάβρυτα
- Municipality
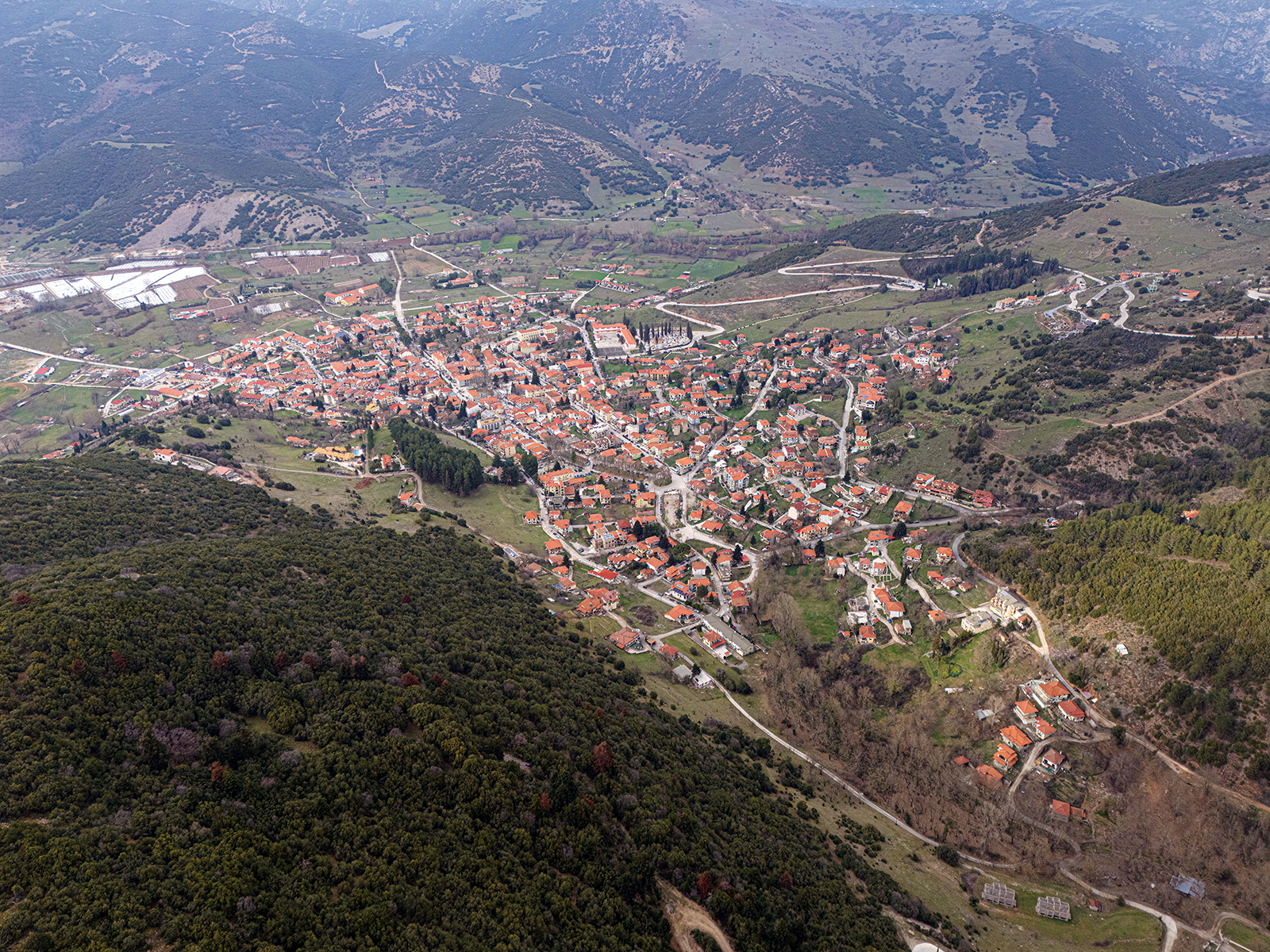
- Kalavryta, as seen from the south

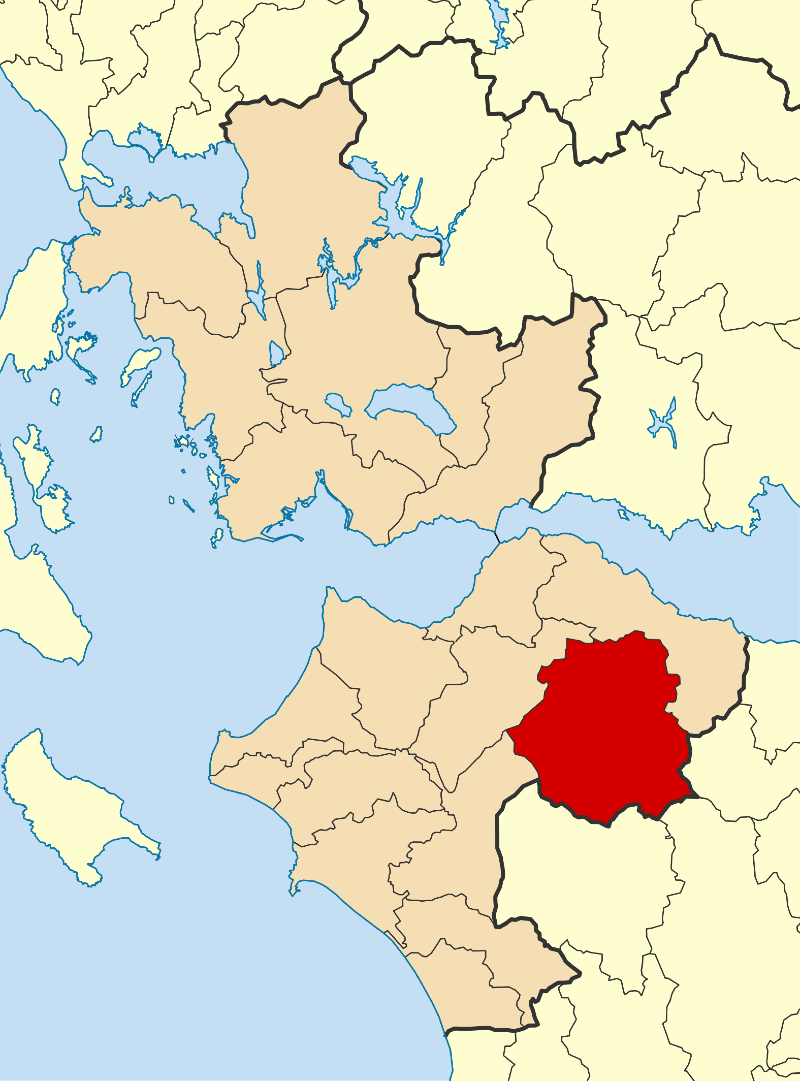

- Location within Greece
- Coordinates: 38°2′N 22°7′E
- Country: Greece
- Geographic region: Peloponnese
- Administrative region: Western Greece
- Regional unit: Achaea

Government
  - Mayor: Athanasios Papadopoulos (since 2019)

Area
  - Municipality: 1,058.2 km^{2} (408.6 sq mi)
  - Municipal unit: 531.8 km^{2} (205.3 sq mi)
- Elevation: 764 m (2,507 ft)

Population (2021)
  - Municipality: 9,223
  - Density: 8.716/km^{2} (22.57/sq mi)
  - Municipal unit: 4,929
  - Municipal unit density: 9.269/km^{2} (24.01/sq mi)
  - Community: 1,702
- Time zone: UTC+2 (EET)
  - Summer (DST): UTC+3 (EEST)
- Postal code: 250 01
- Area code: 26940
- Vehicle registration: ΑΧ
- Website: https://www.kalavrita.gr/

Kalavryta (Greek: Καλάβρυτα) is a town and a municipality in the mountainous east-central part of the regional unit of Achaea, Greece. The town is located on the right bank of the river Vouraikos, 24 kilometres (15 miles) south of Aigio, 40 km (25 miles) southeast of Patras and 62 km (39 miles) northwest of Tripoli. Notable mountains in the municipality are Mount Erymanthos in the west and Aroania or Chelmos in the southeast. Kalavryta is the southern terminus of the Diakopto-Kalavryta rack railway, built by Italian engineers between 1885 and 1895.

== History ==
Kalavryta is built near the ancient city of Cynaetha.

During the late Middle Ages, the town was the centre of the Barony of Kalavryta within the Frankish Principality of Achaea, until it was reconquered by the Byzantines in the 1270s. After that it remained under Byzantine control until the fall of the Despotate of the Morea to the Ottoman Turks in 1460. With the exception of a 30-year interlude of Venetian control, the town remained under Turkish rule until the outbreak of the Greek War of Independence in 1821, in whose early stages Kalavryta figures prominently: it was here that on 21 March 1821 the flag of the revolt was raised at the monastery of Agia Lavra by bishop Germanos III of Old Patras.

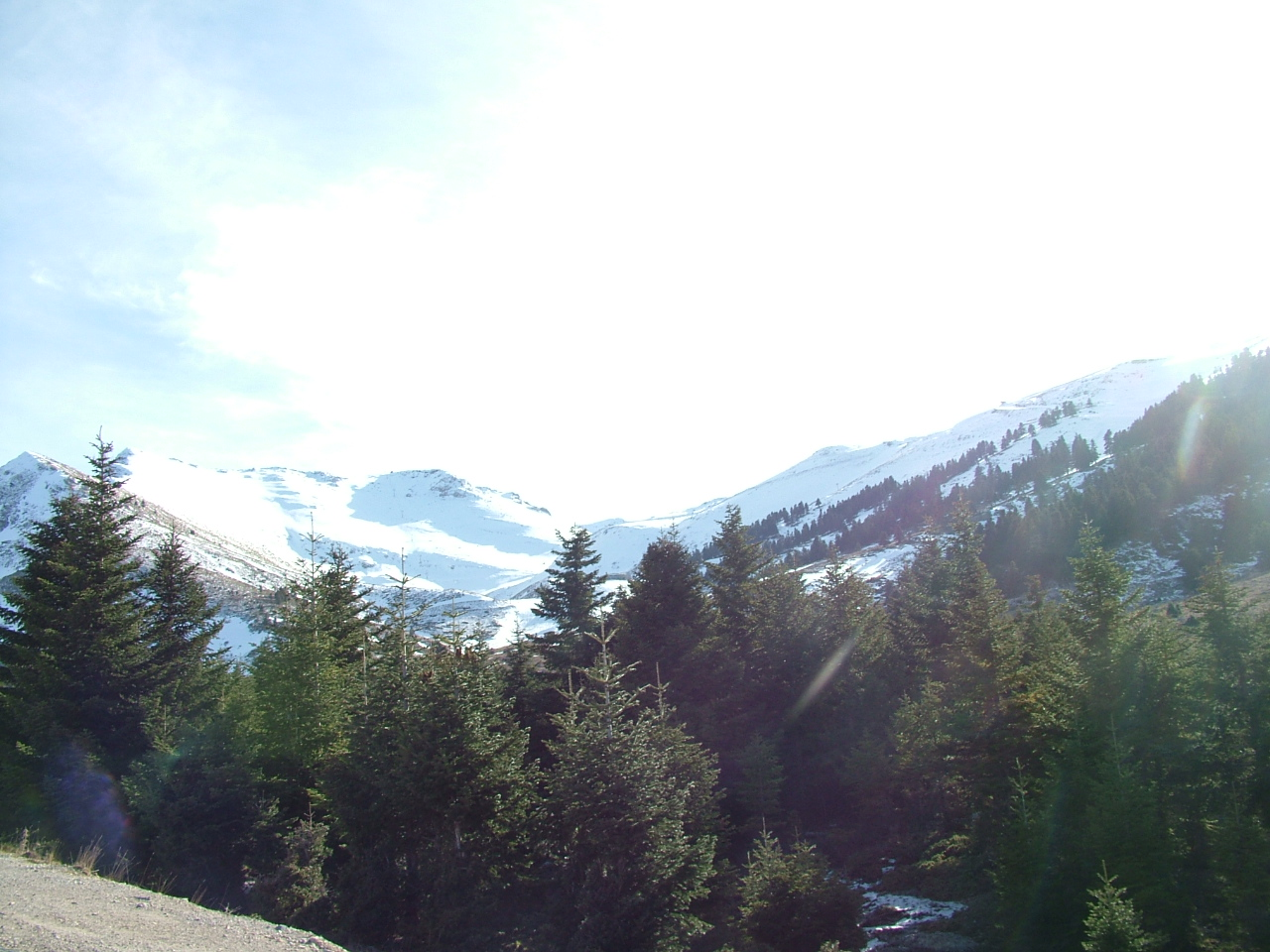
Mt Chelmos near Kalavryta.

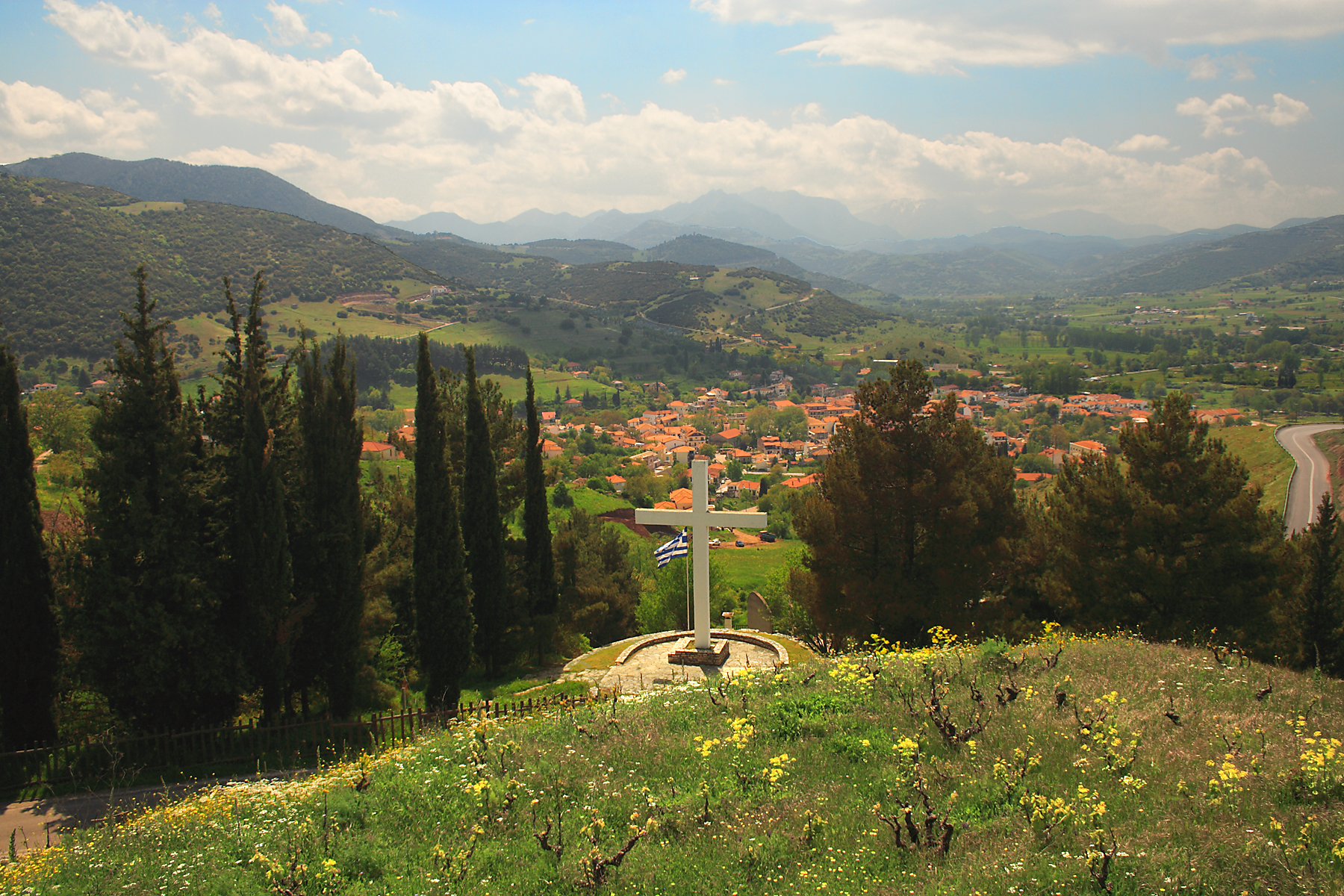
Kalavryta.

At the end of 1943, near Kalavryta, 81 German soldiers, led by Hauptmann Johannes Schober, were captured by Greek partisans. Four Germans were killed on the spot. Three were taken to hospital at Kalavryta but were later shot by the furious partisans. The rest were initially treated as prisoners of war until most were shot dead and some plunged over the cliff near Mazi from the force of the shots. Two German prisoners survived the execution and raised the alarm on the following day 8 December 1943.

On 13 December 1943, in retribution for the killing of the captured German soldiers, German troops perpetrated the Kalavryta massacre: they ordered all male residents of Kalavryta aged 14 years or older to gather in a field just outside the village. Some 1,300 women and children were locked in a school which was then set on fire while the men were looking on from a hill outside the village. Then 696 boys and men were machine-gunned; only 13 survived. After that, they burnt down the town before they left and the next day they burnt down the monastery of Agia Lavra, the birthplace of the Greek War of Independence. In total, 752 civilians were killed during "Operation Kalavryta", a deliberate strategy by the Nazis in order to break the resistance by targeting civilians. After the war, the federal government of Germany offered gestures of atonement in the form of free school books for the high school, scholarships for orphans of the massacre and the building of a retirement home. However, German commanders, including Major Ebersberger who carried out the destruction of Kalavryta and Hauptmann Dohnert who led the firing party, were never brought to justice for their crimes.

The Kalavryta region also became the site of fighting during the Greek Civil War. On 11 April 1948, Kalavryta was seized by the Democratic Army of Greece (DSE) after the former overpowered the town's garrison. DSE released 17 leftists held in the local gendarmerie building, while also emptying the national guard and United Nations Relief and Rehabilitation Administration warehouses; taking 400 million drachmas and large quantities of food and military equipment in the process.

== Historical population ==
Kalavryta municipality & municipal unit

Year	Community	Municipal unit	Municipality
1981	2,015	-	-
1991	2,111	8,306	-
2001	1,942	8,580	-
2011	1,829	6,011	11,045
2021	1,702	4,929	9,223

== Landmarks ==
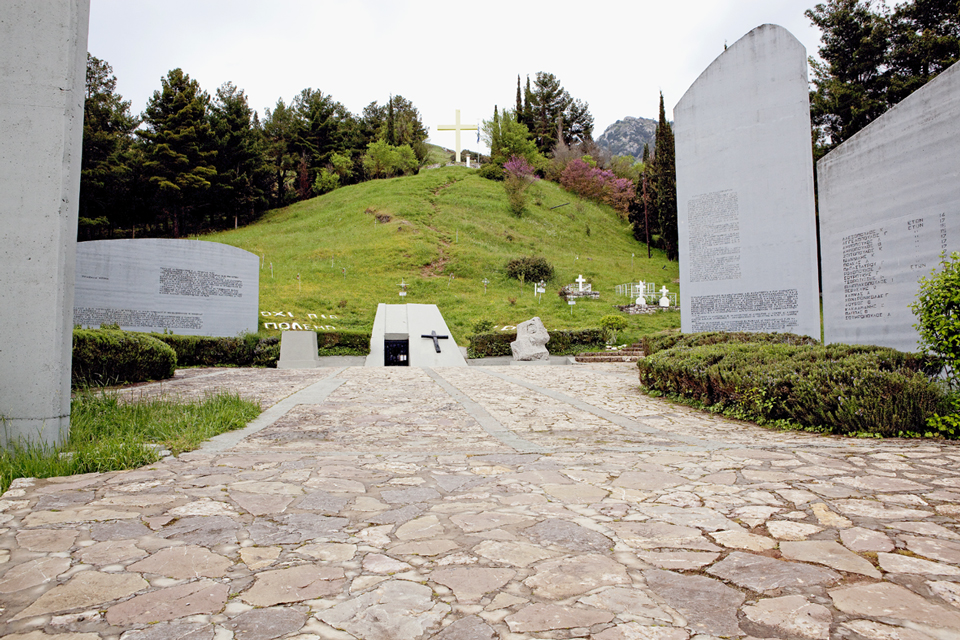
The memorial site.

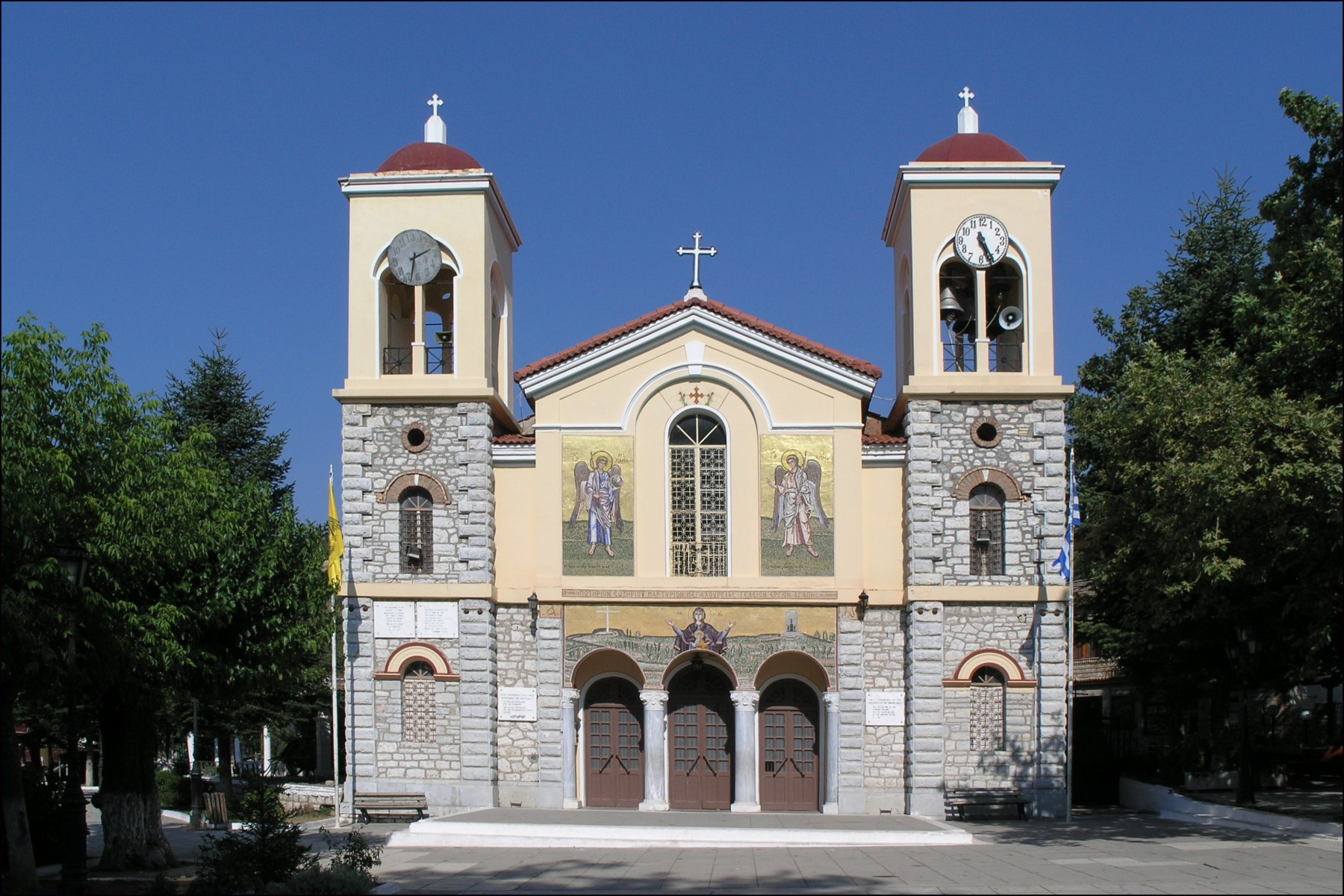
View of the Cathedral.

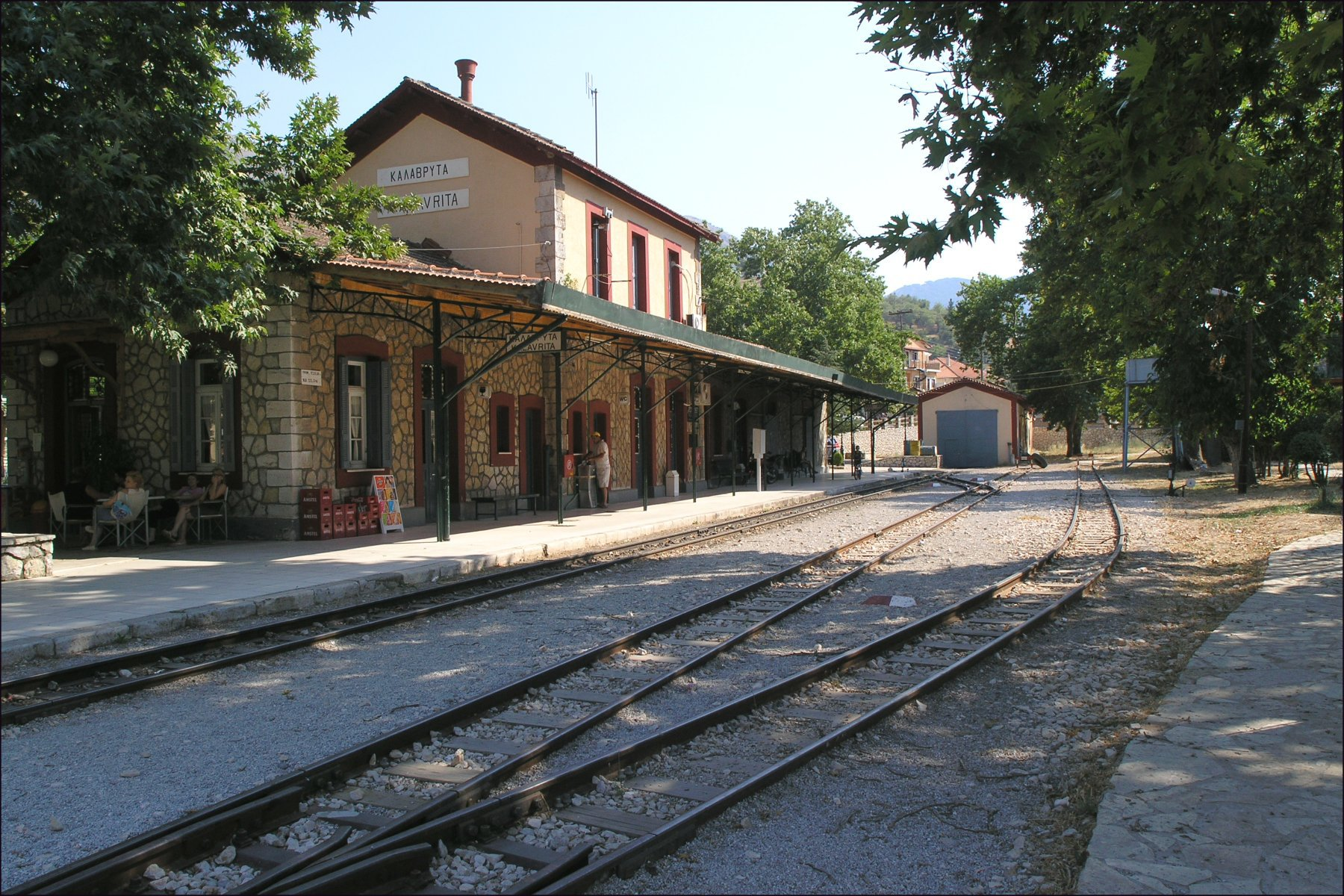
The railway station.

In Kastria, in the municipal unit of Kleitoria, there is the famous cave system Spilaio ton Limnon ("Cave of the Lakes") which is filled with beautiful lakes and strange rock formations. Kalavryta has a ski centre which is located east of town, on the slopes of Chelmos. The monastery of Agia Lavra is located on a hill 4 km (2 mi) southwest of Kalavryta. Another famous monastery nearby is Mega Spilaio which is located 8 km (5 mi) northeast.

== Administration ==
The municipality Kalavryta was formed at the 2011 local government reform by the merger of the following 4 former municipalities, that became municipal units:

- Aroania
- Kalavryta
- Kleitoria
- Paia

The municipality has an area of 1,058.147 km^{2}, the municipal unit 531.797 km^{2}.

=== Subdivisions ===
The municipal unit of Kalavryta is divided into the following communities:

- Ano Vlasia
- Ano Lousoi
- Doumena
- Drosato
- Flampoura (Flampoura, Neochori, Ortholithi)
- Goumenissa
- Kalavryta (Kalavryta, Avlonas, Vrachni, Krastikoi, Moni Agias Lavras, Souvardo)
- Kallifoni
- Kandalos
- Kato Lousoi (Kato Lousoi, Lousiko)
- Kato Vlasia (Kato Vlasia, Menychtaiika, Metochi)
- Kato Zachlorou
- Kerpini
- Kertezi
- Korfes
- Kouteli
- Kryoneri
- Lagovouni
- Lapanagoi
- Manesi Kalavryton (Manesi, Boumpoukas)
- Mikros Pontias (Mikros Pontias, Karousi, Lompokas, Megas Pontias)
- Petsakoi (Petsakoi, Bosi)
- Plataniotissa (Plataniotissa, Digela, Spartinou)
- Priolithos
- Profitis Ilias (Profitis Ilias, Mouriki)
- Rogoi
- Sigouni (Sigouni, Lefki)
- Skepasto
- Trechlo (Trechlo, Lapatheia)
- Valta
- Vilivina

=== Province ===
The province of Kalavryta (Greek: Επαρχία Καλαβρύτων) was one of the provinces of Achaea. It had the same territory as the present municipality. It was abolished in 2006.

== Notable people ==
- Panagiotis Anagnostopoulos, Lieutenant General of the Greek Army
- Anastasios Charalambis (1862–1949), military officer, PM of Greece
- Asimakis Fotilas (1761–1835), politician and revolutionary leader
- Panagiotakis Fotilas (died 1824), politician and revolutionary leader
- Jim Fouras (1938–2021), Australian politician
- Andreas Panagopoulos (1883–1952), politician and four times mayor of Agrinio
- Georgios Papandreou (1859–1940), historian
- Miltiadis Papaioannou (born 1947), politician
- Anagnostis Petimezas (1765–1822), revolutionary leader during the Greek War of Independence
- Konstantinos Petimezas (c. 1764–1824), revolutionary leader during the Greek War of Independence
- Nikolaos Petimezas (1790–1865), military leader
- Aristovoulos Petmezas, gymnast and sport shooter
- Konstantinos Plegas (born 1997), footballer
- Ioannis Sofianopoulos (1887–1951), politician
- Panagiotis Spiliotopoulos (1891–1962), Hellenic Army officer
- Georgios Theodorakopoulos (born 1944), water polo player
- Andreas Zaimis (1791–1840), freedom fighter and government leader during the Greek War of Independence
- Alexandros Zaimis (1855–1936), Prime Minister, Minister of the Interior, Minister of Justice, and High Commissioner of Crete. He served as prime minister six times.
- Thrasyvoulos Zaimis (1822–1880), 21st Prime Minister of Greece
- Germanos Zapheiropoulos (1760–1821), priest and bishop

== See also ==
- List of settlements in Achaea
- Chelmos-Vouraikos UNESCO Global Geopark
