= Dimitris Anagnostopoulos =

Greek chess grandmaster (born 1970)

Personal information
- Born: June 11, 1970 (age 56)

Chess career
- Country: England (until 1996); Greece (since 1996)
- Title: Grandmaster (1996)
- FIDE rating: 2456 (July 2026)
- Peak rating: 2515 (July 1996)

Dimitris Anagnostopoulos (Greek: Δημήτρης Αναγνωστόπουλος; born 1970) is a Greek chess grandmaster. Anagnostopoulos grew up in England, where he was known as Demetrios Agnos, before switching federations to Greece in 1996. He played for "Kallithea Athens" (Greece) in the 7th European Chess Club Cup in 1990.
