= Germanos III of Old Patras =

Greek bishop and revolutionary

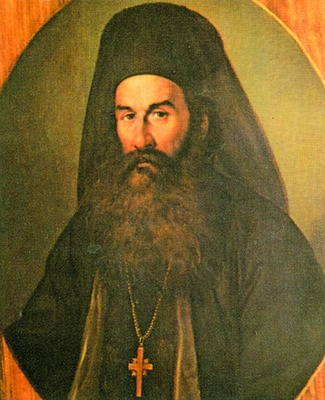
Germanos III of Old Patras (1771–1826)

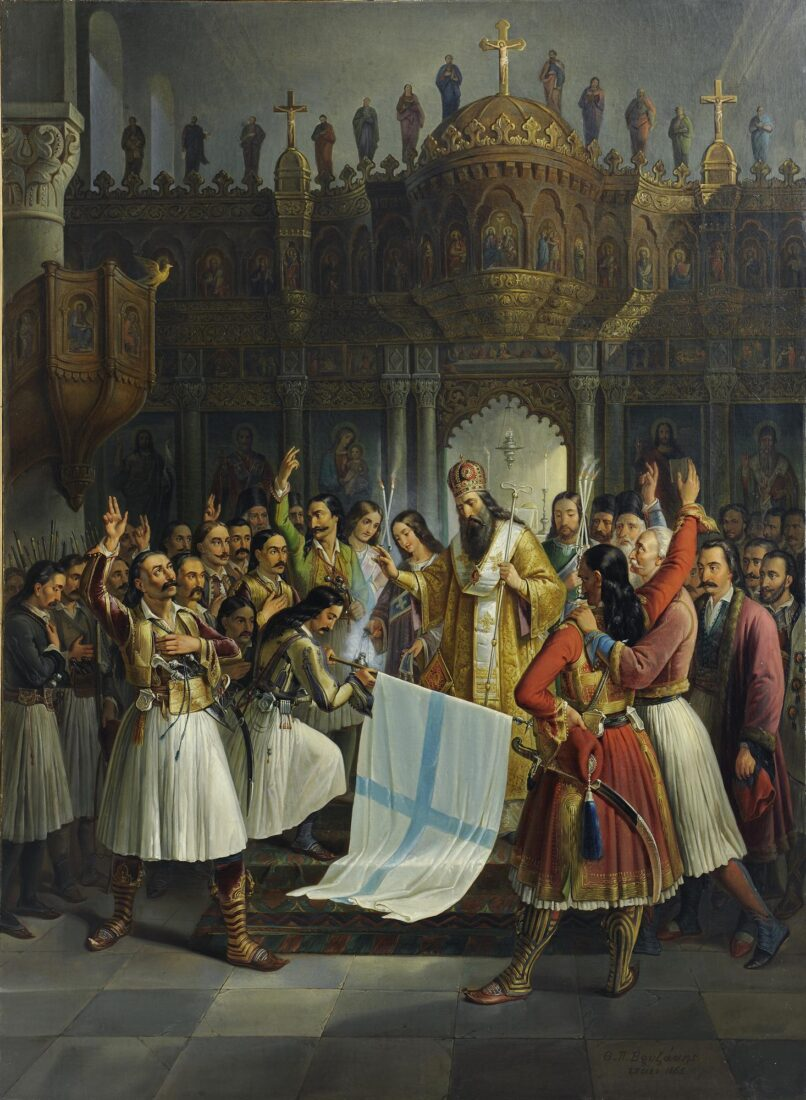
Monastery Agia Lavra, Germanos blessing the flag. Painting by Theodoros Vryzakis, 1865

Germanos III of Old Patras (Greek: Παλαιών Πατρών Γερμανός Γʹ; 25 March 1771 – 30 May 1826), born Georgios Kontzias (Γεώργιος Κοντζιάς), was an Orthodox Metropolitan of Patras. He played an important role in the Greek Revolution of 1821, having diplomatic and political activity.

Germanos was born in Dimitsana, northwestern Arcadia, Peloponnese. Before his consecration as Metropolitan of Patras by Patriarch Gregory V, he had served as a priest and protosyncellus in Smyrna. He died in Nafplio.

== Greek Revolution ==
According to tradition and several written sources, on March 25 (6 April in the Gregorian calendar), the Feast of Annunciation, 1821, Bishop Germanos proclaimed the Greek national uprising against the Ottoman Empire and blessed the flag of the revolution at the Monastery of Agia Lavra. Earlier, another revolt of the Greek War of Independence had also been declared on February 21 by Alexandros Ypsilantis in Iaşi, which was crushed by June 1821.
