= Kertezi =

Kertezi Κέρτεζη
- Community
- Location within Greece
- Coordinates: 37°58′N 21°59′E
- Country: Greece
- Administrative region: West Greece
- Regional unit: Achaea
- Municipality: Kalavryta
- Municipal unit: Kalavryta

Population (2021)
  - Community: 335
- Time zone: UTC+2 (EET)
  - Summer (DST): UTC+3 (EEST)
- Vehicle registration: AX

Kertezi (Greek: Κέρτεζη) is a mountain village in the municipality of Kalavryta, Achaea, Greece. It is built in the valley of a tributary of the river Vouraikos, east of the mountain Kallifoni. It is 12 km southwest of Kalavryta. During the Greek War of Independence, Anagnostis Striftombolas came to Kertezi, took a military body of 15 men and battled in the Battle of Levidi, where he was killed on 14 April 1821.

== Population ==
Year	Population
1981	639
1991	542
2001	460
2011	365
2021	335

== See also ==
- List of settlements in Achaea
