= Lapanagoi =

Lapanagoi Λαπαναγοί
- Community
- Location within Greece
- Coordinates: 38°06′43″N 21°58′19″E
- Country: Greece
- Administrative region: Western Greece
- Regional unit: Achaea
- Municipality: Kalavryta
- Municipal unit: Kalavryta

Population (2021)
  - Community: 12
- Time zone: UTC+2 (EET)
  - Summer (DST): UTC+3 (EEST)

Lapanagoi (Greek: Λαπαναγοί) is a village in the municipality of Kalavryta, Achaea, Greece. The village is on the border between the municipalities of Aigialeia and Kalavryta and is located south east of Leonteios and across the valley from the Makellarias Monastery.
