= Rural Security Units =

The Rural Security Units (Greek: Μονάδες Ασφαλείας Υπαίθρου, romanized Monádes Asfaleías Ypaíthrou), abbreviated to MAY and also known as the Maydes, were an armed paramilitary organization created in fall 1946 during the Greek Civil War. They primarily fought against the Democratic Army of Greece. The MAY mainly recruited former members of the EDES who resided in the countryside, collaborating with the Hellenic Gendarmerie and the National Guard. They mainly operated in the Epirus region. They were dissolved in 1948.
