= Mega Spilaio =

Greek Orthodox monastery in Greece

- Μέγα Σπήλαιο
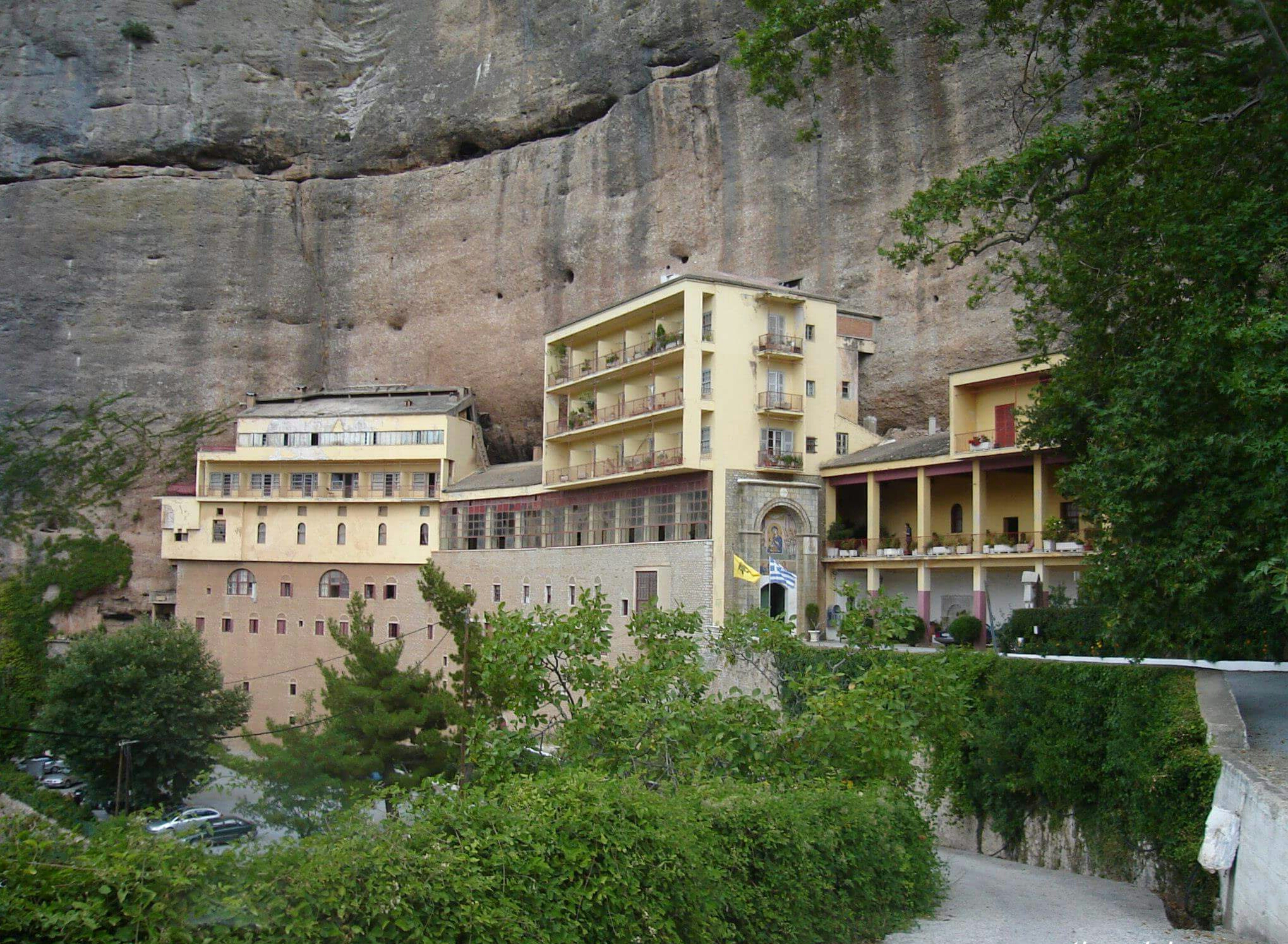
- View of the monastery in 2016

- Location within Greece
- Interactive map of Mega Spilaio

Monastery information
- Full name: Monastery of the Dormition of the Theotokos
- Established: 362 (traditional)

People
- Founders: Symeon and Theodore of Thessalonica
- Prior: Archimandrite Kallinikos Apostolopoulos

Site
- Coordinates: 38°05′21.8″N 22°10′30.7″E

Mega Spilaio (Greek: Μέγα Σπήλαιο, lit. 'Great Cave'), formally the Monastery of the Dormition of the Theotokos (Ιερά Μονή Κοιμήσεως της Θεοτόκου), is a Greek Orthodox monastery in the municipality of Kalavryta, in the Peloponnese peninsula in southern Greece.

== History ==
The monastery is located in a large cave in a sheer cliff, where the western slopes of Mount Chelmos drop down to the gorge of the Vouraikos river, some 11 kilometres (6.8 mi) northwest of the town of Kalavryta. The cave was known in antiquity, and the geographer Pausanias reports that the daughters of Proetus found refuge there during their madness. In the first Christian centuries, Christian hermits occupied the cave.

According to tradition, the monastery is one of the oldest in Greece, reputedly founded in 362 by the Thessalonian brothers Symeon and Theodore, who with the help of Euphrosyne (a local shepherdess, honoured as saint for her part in these events) discovered in the cave the icon of the Theotokos painted by Luke the Evangelist.

Its medieval history under Byzantine and Latin rule is obscure. The monastery gained prominence only from about 1354, when it served as the residence of the Orthodox Metropolitan of Patras, since the city was still occupied by the Latins and the seat of a Latin archbishopric. The complex suffered large-scale destructions in 849, 1400, and 1640, when it was comprehensively rebuilt.

Several of the monks became members of the Filiki Etaireia and took part in the Greek War of Independence. In 1934, the katholikon was destroyed in a fire, and replaced by a new church in 1937. On 8 December 1943, the German 117th Jäger Division destroyed the monastery and executed 22 monks and visitors as part of reprisals that culminated a few days later with the Massacre of Kalavryta.

The monastery was rebuilt from the ground after the war, and now comprises an eight-storey complex set in the 120 metres (390 ft) high cliff face. A male monastery, it celebrates on 15 August (the day of the Dormition), 14 September, and 18 October (Luke the Evangelist and the ktetors).

== Sources ==
- Bon, Antoine (1969). La Morée franque. Recherches historiques, topographiques et archéologiques sur la principauté d'Achaïe (in French). Paris: De Boccard.
