= Agia Lavra =

Historic monastery in Kalavryta Municipality, Achaia, Greece

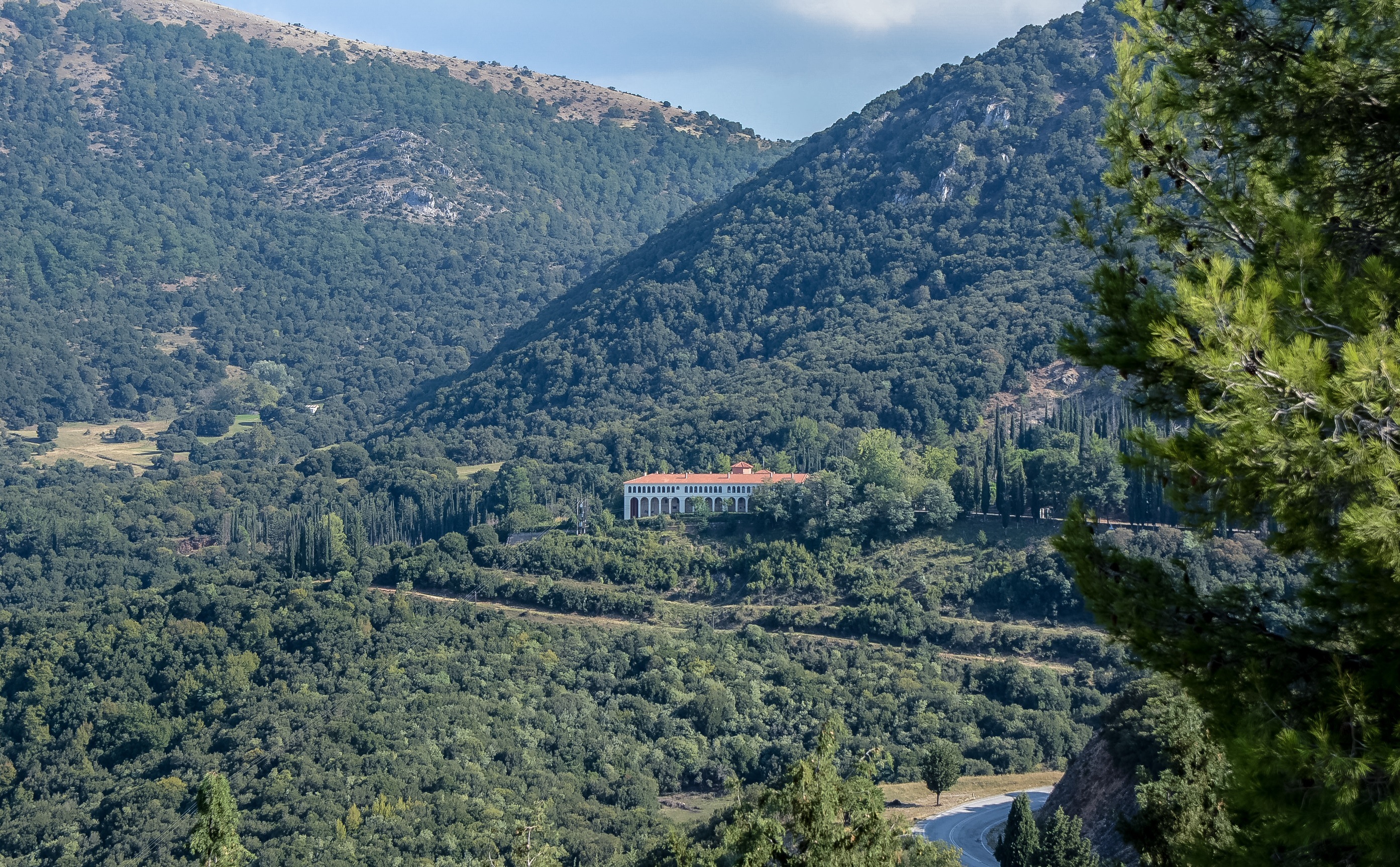
- The monastery in 2016, viewed from the Greek War of Independence monument

- Location within Greece
- Interactive map of Agia Lavra

Monastery information
- Order: Ecumenical Patriarchate of Constantinople
- Denomination: Eastern Orthodox Church
- Established: 961 AD

People
- Important associated figures: Eleftheria I Thanatos; Germanos of Patras

Architecture
- Status: Monastery
- Functional status: Active

Site
- Location: Chelmos Mountain, Kalavryta, Achaea, Peloponnese
- Country: Greece
- Coordinates: 38°0′47″N 22°4′52″E

The Agia Lavra ("Holy Lavra") is an Eastern Orthodox monastery near Kalavryta, Achaea, Greece. It was built in 961 AD, on Chelmos Mountain, at 961 metres (3,153 ft) above sea level, and can be described as the symbolic birthplace of modern Greece. It stands as one of the oldest monasteries in the Peloponnese.

== History ==
It was burnt to the ground in 1585 by the Turks. It was rebuilt in 1600 while the frescoes by Anthimos were completed in 1645. It was burnt again in 1715 and in 1826 by the armies of Ibrahim Pasha of Egypt. In 1850 after the rebirth of modern Greece, the building was completely rebuilt. The monastery was burned down by German forces in 1943; and subsequently rebuilt.

It is famously linked with the Greek War of Independence, since it was here that the call for Eleftheria I Thanatos (Greek: Ελευθερία ή θάνατος) was first heard on 25 March 1821, launching the revolution against the Ottoman Empire. That day, Bishop Germanos of Patras performed a doxology and administered an oath to the Peloponnesian fighters. The revolutionary flag was raised by the Bishop under the plane tree just outside the gate of the monastery.

To this day, the vestments of Germanos, documents, books, icons, the Gospel of Tsarina Catherine II of Russia, sacred vessels, crosses, etc. are preserved in the monastery's museum, along with the holy relics of St Alexios, given by Byzantine emperor Manuel II Palaeologus in 1398. Pieces of embroidery, made with gold or silver threads woven in pure silk materials in Smyrna and Constantinople, are also possessions of the monastery and they date from the 16th century.

A monument to the heroes of the 1821 Greek Revolution, located on a hill opposite, overlooks the monastery.

== Gallery ==
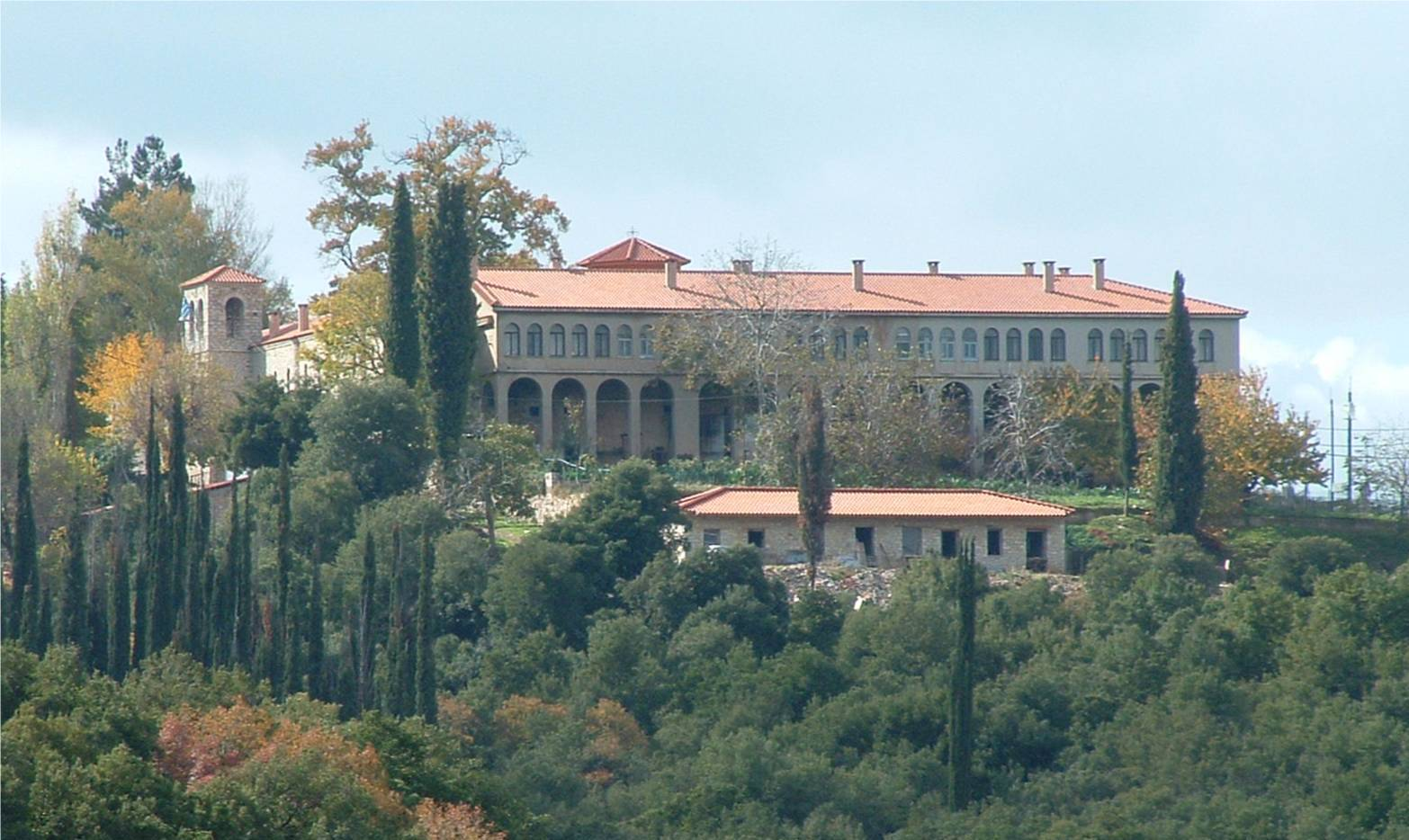
Monastery

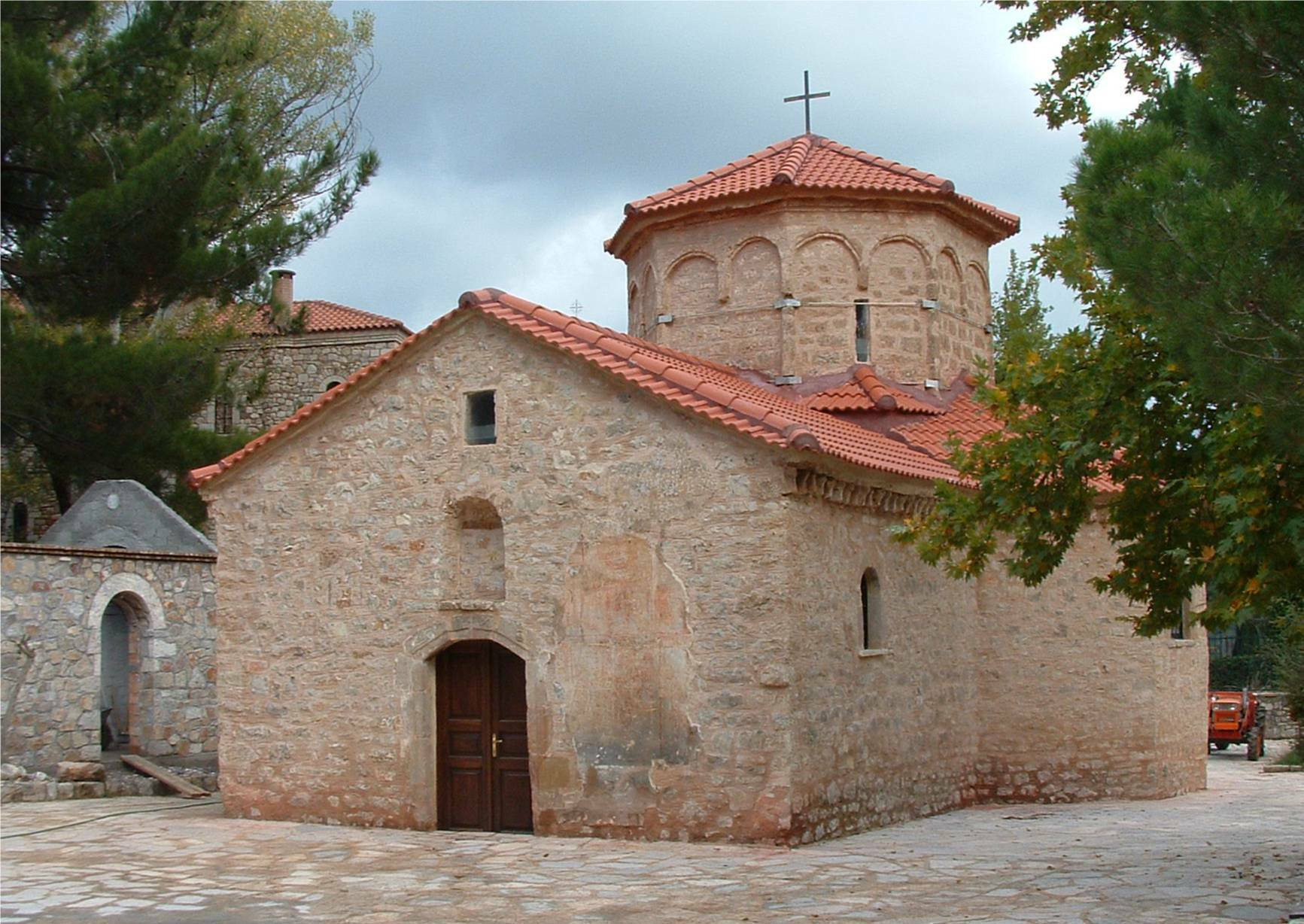
Church

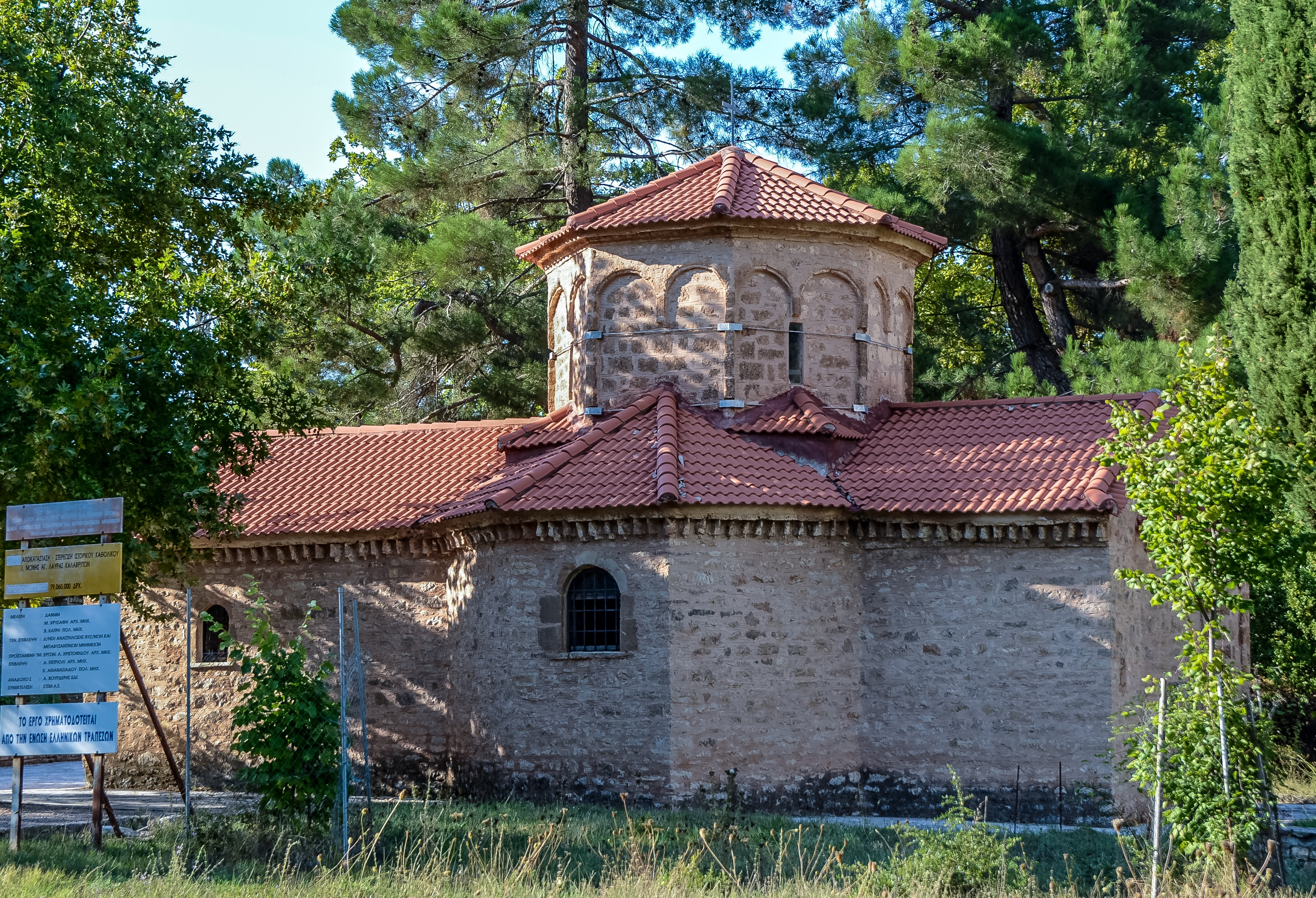
The monastery in 2016

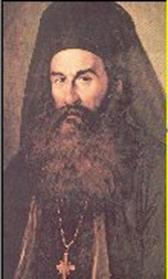
Portrait of Germanos of Patras

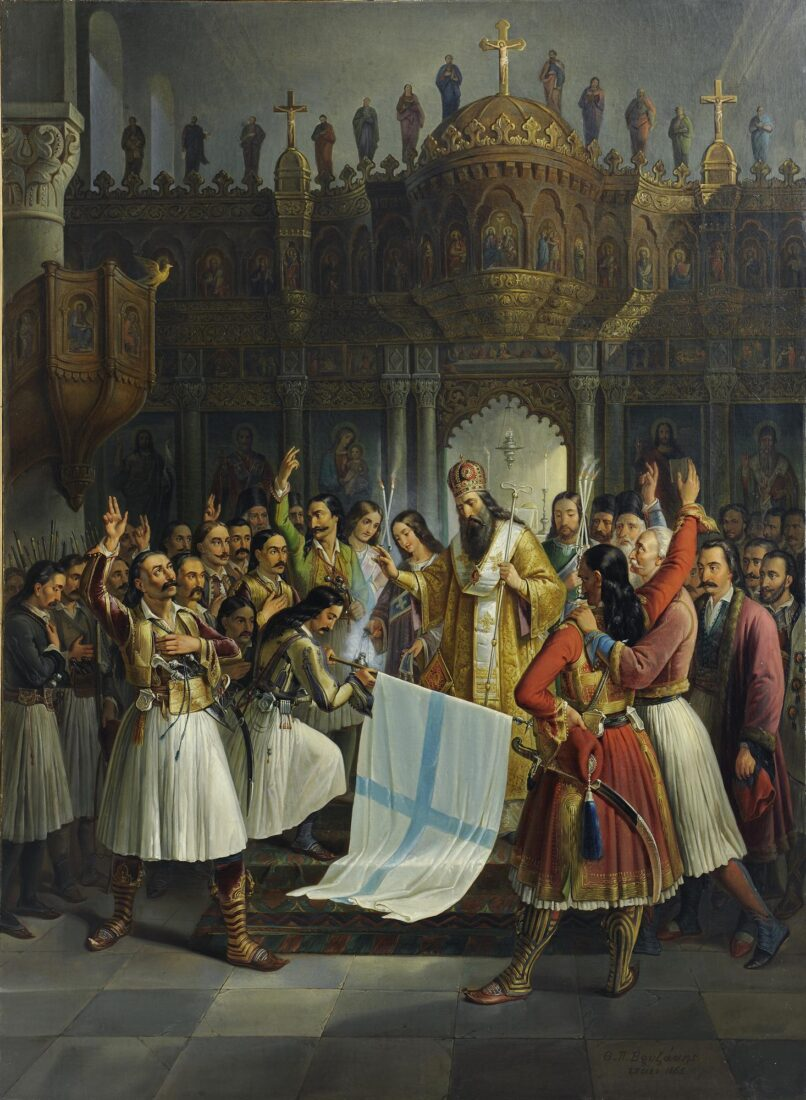
Germanos of Patras blessing the flag of the Greek resistance at the monastery (by Theodoros Vryzakis, 1865)

== See also ==
- List of monasteries in Greece
- List of museums in Greece
