= Panagiotis Anagnostopoulos (general) =

Panagiotis "Takis" Anagnostopoulos (Greek: Παναγιώτης (Τάκης) Αναγνωστόπουλος) was a Lieutenant General of the Greek Army and close friend and associate of Prime Ministers Georgios Papandreou and Andreas Papandreou. In 1965, he was a central figure in the so-called ASPIDA affair.

== Life ==
He was born in Kalavryta in 1914, and grew up in Patras. He graduated from the Hellenic Military Academy as a Second Lieutenant of Artillery and fought in the Greco-Italian War, in the Middle East and in the Greek Civil War on the side of the Greek government against the communists.

In November 1963, when Georgios Papandreou became Prime Minister, Anagnostopoulos, then a Colonel, was appointed Chief of the Espionage Branch of the Central Intelligence Service (KYP), a post he held until May 1965, when he became overall Chief of KYP. However, two months later, in July 1965, the Iouliana brought down the government, and he was also one of the officers accused of being implicated in the so-called ASPIDA affair. In the ASPIDA trial, that concluded in early 1967, just before the imposition of the Regime of the Colonels, he was acquitted on all charges.

Following the restoration of democracy in 1974, and the establishment of the PASOK party by Andreas Papandreou, Anagnostopoulos remained an influential adviser on military and security issues. From October 1981 until September 1984, he was secretary-general of the Ministry of Public Order, while from September 1984 until the early 1990s he was director-general of PASOK.
