= Asimakis Fotilas =

Greek politician and revolutionary leader

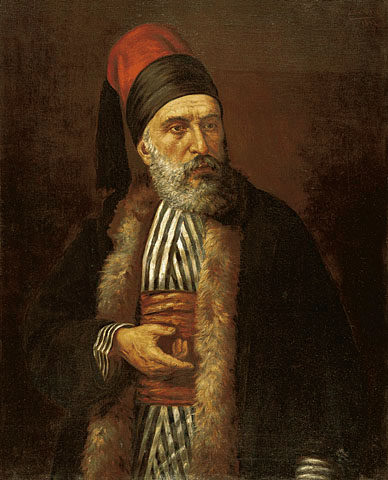
- Portrait by Ioannis Oikonomou
- Born: c. 1761; Kalavryta, Ottoman Empire (now Greece)
- Died: 1835; Kalavryta, Greece
- Occupation: Greek revolutionary leader

Asimakis Fotilas (Greek: Ασημάκης Φωτήλας) (c. 1761–1835) was a Greek politician and revolutionary leader.

== Biography ==
He was born in Kalavryta and was a primate of Kalavryta, who later took part in the Greek War of Independence. Nearly two months before the start of the war, in January 1821, he took part in the Vostitsa council. In March 1821, he took part in the Ayia Lavra council and supported the idea of immediate action against the Ottomans. He was vice-president of the Peloponnesian Senate and president of the parliament in 1822. He took part in the Georgios Kountouriotis government in 1824 from which he resigned quickly and became a political opponent of Kountouriotis. He was prosecuted by Kountouriotis and his house was plundered. Later, when King Otto came to power he was re-instated and became a general.
