= List of rivers of Greece =

This is a list of rivers that are at least partially in Greece. The rivers flowing into the sea are sorted along the coast. Rivers flowing into other rivers are listed by the rivers they flow into. The confluence is given in parentheses.

For an alphabetical overview of rivers of Greece see Category:Rivers of Greece.

== Tributaries ==
=== Adriatic Sea ===
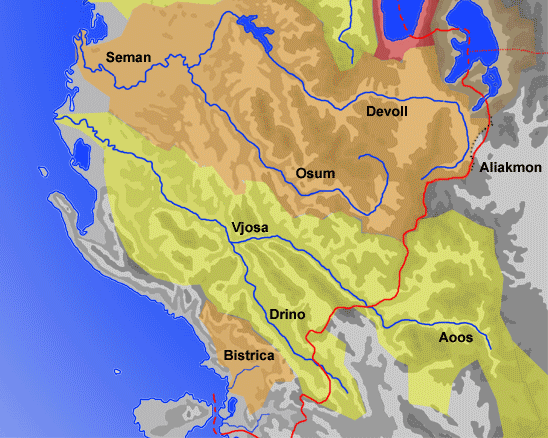
Aoos/Vjosë river map

- Aoos/Vjosë (near Novoselë, Albania)
  - Drino (in Tepelenë, Albania)
  - Sarantaporos (near Çarshovë, Albania)
  - Voidomatis (near Konitsa)

=== Ionian Sea ===
Rivers in this section are sorted north (Albanian border) to south (Cape Malea).

Epirus & Central Greece

- Pavla/Pavllë (near Vrinë, Albania)
- Thyamis (near Igoumenitsa)
  - Tyria (near Vrosina)
- Acheron (near Parga)
- Louros (near Preveza)
- Arachthos (in Kommeno)
- Acheloos (near Astakos)
  - Megdovas (near Fragkista)
  - Agrafiotis (near Fragkista)
  - Granitsiotis (near Granitsa)
- Evinos (near Missolonghi)
- Mornos (near Nafpaktos)
- Pleistos, near Kirra

Peloponnese

Alfios & rivers of Peloponnese. Labels in German

- Elissonas (in Dimini)
- Fonissa (near Xylokastro)
- Zacholitikos (in Derveni)
- Krios (in Aigeira)
- Krathis (near Akrata)
- Vouraikos (near Diakopto)
- Selinountas (near Aigio)
- Volinaios (in Psathopyrgos)
- Charadros (in Patras)
- Glafkos (in Patras)
- Peiros (in Dymi)
  - Tytheus (in Olenia)
- Larissos (near Araxos)
- Pineios (near Gastouni)
- Alfeios (near Pyrgos)
  - Erymanthos (near Tripotamia)
  - Ladon (near Tripotamia)
    - Aroanios (near Filia)
  - Lousios (near Gortyna)
  - Elissonas (near Megalopoli)
- Neda (near Giannitsochori)
- Peristeri (in Kalo Nero)
- Pamisos (near Messene)
- Nedonas (in Kalamata)
- Eurotas (in Elos)
  - Oenus (in Sparti)

=== Aegean Sea ===
Rivers in this section are sorted south (Cape Malea) to northeast (Turkish border).

Peloponnese

- Inachos (in Nea Kios)

Central Greece

- Cephissus (in Athens)
  - Eridanos
- Ilisos, Athens
- Asopos (in Skala Oropou)
- Spercheios (near Lamia)
  - Gorgopotamos (near Lamia)

Thessaly

- Pineios (in Stomio)
  - Titarisios (in Ampelonas)
    - Sarantaporos (in Milea)
  - Enipeas (in Farkadona)
  - Portaikos, Trikala
- Anavros, Volos
- Krausidonas, Volos

Macedonia

- Haliacmon (in Methoni)
  - Loudias
- Axios/Vardar (near Thessaloniki)
- Gallikos (near Thessaloniki)
- Strymonas/Struma (in Amphipolis)
  - Angitis (near Tragilos)
- Nestos/Mesta (near Keramoti)
  - Despatis/Dospat (near Sidironero)

Thrace

- Evros/Maritsa (near Alexandroupoli)
  - Erythropotamos/Luda reka (near Didymoteicho)
  - Ardas/Arda (near Edirne, Turkey)
- Vosvozis, Lake Ismarida
- Kompsatos, Lake Vistonida
- Kosynthos, Lake Vistonida

=== Libyan Sea ===
- Anapodaris, Crete

== No outflow into sea ==
- Cephissus into lake Yliki, Boeotia
  - Kanianitis (in Lilaia)
- Olvios into the Feneos plains, Corinthia

== Ancient rivers and streams ==
- Ammites (stream; emptied into Lake Bolbe)
- Bisaltes
- Elpeus
- Erasinos (emptied into the modern Petalies Gulf)
- Erechios (stream; emptied into the Strymonic Gulf)
- Olynthiakos (stream; emptied into Lake Bolbe)
- Rhoedias (emptied into the Thermaic Gulf)
