= Otto Walter =

Otto Walter may refer to:

- Otto Walter (archaeologist), Austrian archaeologist
- Otto F. Walter, Swiss publisher and author
