= Wilhelm Alzinger =

Austrian archaeologist

Wilhelm Alzinger (August 11, 1928 in Vienna – January 2, 1998 in Vienna) was an Austrian classical archaeologist.

== Life ==
Alzinger studied classical archaeology at the University of Vienna from 1946 and earned his doctorate under Hedwig Kenner and Arthur Betz with a thesis on Roman burial grounds in Austria. From 1952, Alzinger was a member of staff at the Austrian Archaeological Institute. In 1967 he was named a State Archaeologist of the first class. In 1970 he was promoted to professor at the University of Vienna with a work on Augustan architecture in Ephesus, teaching there alongside his role at the AAI as a lecturer (from 1971) and then as an associate professor (from 1978). His teaching focused on architecture and building research; he retired in 1993.

Alzinger took part inter alia in excavations at Ephesus and Agrigento. In 1956, he was leader of excavations in Aguntum, and from 1972 to 1988, he led an excavation in Aigeira.

He was a member of the German Archaeological Institute. Between 1956 and 1961 and then 1974 and 1977, he was the Chairman or Vice-Chairman of the Austrian Society for Pre- and Ancient History.

He is buried at Baumgartner Cemetery in Vienna.

== Works ==
- Die Stadt des siebenten Weltwunders. Die Wiederentdeckung von Ephesos, Vienna, 1962
- Das Monument des C. Memmius, Vienna, 1971 (with Anton Bammer)
- Die Ruinen von Ephesos, Berlin, 1972
- Augusteische Architektur, Vienna, 1974
