= Josef Keil =

Josef Keil (13 October 1878 – 13 December 1963) was an Austrian historian, epigrapher and an archaeologist.

Keil was born on 13 October 1878 in Reichenberg, northern Bohemia (now Czech Republic). He studied classical literature, epigraphy and archaeology at the University of Vienna, and received his doctorate there. He began his career in 1904 as a scientific secretary at the Austrian archaeological institute in Smyrna (now İzmir, Turkey). He excavated archaeological sites in Asia Minor, particularly in Lydia. He led the excavations in Ephesus. He was a professor of ancient history at the University of Greifswald from 1927 to 1936, and at the University of Vienna from 1936 to 1951. From 1945 until 1949, he was the Secretary General of the Austrian Academy of Sciences. From 1949 to 1956, he was the director of the Austrian Archaeological Institute with Otto Walter and Fritz Eichler.

He died in Vienna on 13 December 1963.

== Works ==
Numerous publications of inscriptions from Ephesus especially in Jahresheften des Österreichischen Archäologischen Instituts.

- Ephesos. Ein Führer durch die Ruinenstätte und ihre Geschichte, Vienna, 1915
- Drei Berichte über Reisen in Lydien und weiteren Gebieten, Three reports over journeys in Lydia and other areas (with Anton von Premerstein), Vienna, 1908, 1911, 1914

== Decorations and awards ==
- 1959: Austrian Decoration for Science and Art
- 1962: City of Vienna Prize for Humanities
