= Fritz Eichler =

Austrian archaeologist

Fritz Eichler (October 12, 1887 - January 16, 1971) was an Austrian archaeologist.

He was born in Graz, where he graduated in 1910, and studied in Berlin, England, Italy, Greece and Asia Minor, and was active from 1913 to 1933 as the antiquity collector at the Kunsthistorisches Museum, the art history museum in Vienna. From 1933 to 1935, he was the director of the antiquity collection. Before his retirement, he was the first director of the museum from 1951 to 1952. He was a professor of classical archaeology at the University of Vienna. He teamed up with Otto Walter and became a director of the Österreichisches Archäologisches Institut, the Austrian Archaeological Institute. He managed the excavations at Ephesus and took the institute at Athens. He excavated until 1961, he applied for the management of the OEAI until 1969. His research concerned antiques from the small art to the sculptures connected with Ephesus. He died in Vienna.

== Works ==
- Führer durch die Antikensammlung, 1926
- Die Skulpturen des Heraions von Argos, in Jahreshefte des Österreichischen Archäologischen Instituts 19/29, 1929 p. 15
- Die Reliefs des Heroon von Gjölbaschi-Trysa, 1950
- Kunsthistorisches Museum I, Die rotfigurigen attischen Trinkgefäße und Pyxiden, 1951
- Die Bronzestatue aus Ephesos in verbesserter Wiederherstellung = in JbKS, Vienna, 1953, p. 15
- Kunsthistorisches Museum I, Rotfigurige attische Vorratsgefäße, 1959
- Nochmals die Sphinxgruppe von Ephesos, in Jahreshefte des Österreichischen Archäologischen Instituts 45, 1960, p. 5
- Zum Partherdenkmal von Ephesos. Rohrer, 1971, p. 102
