= Krafsidonas =

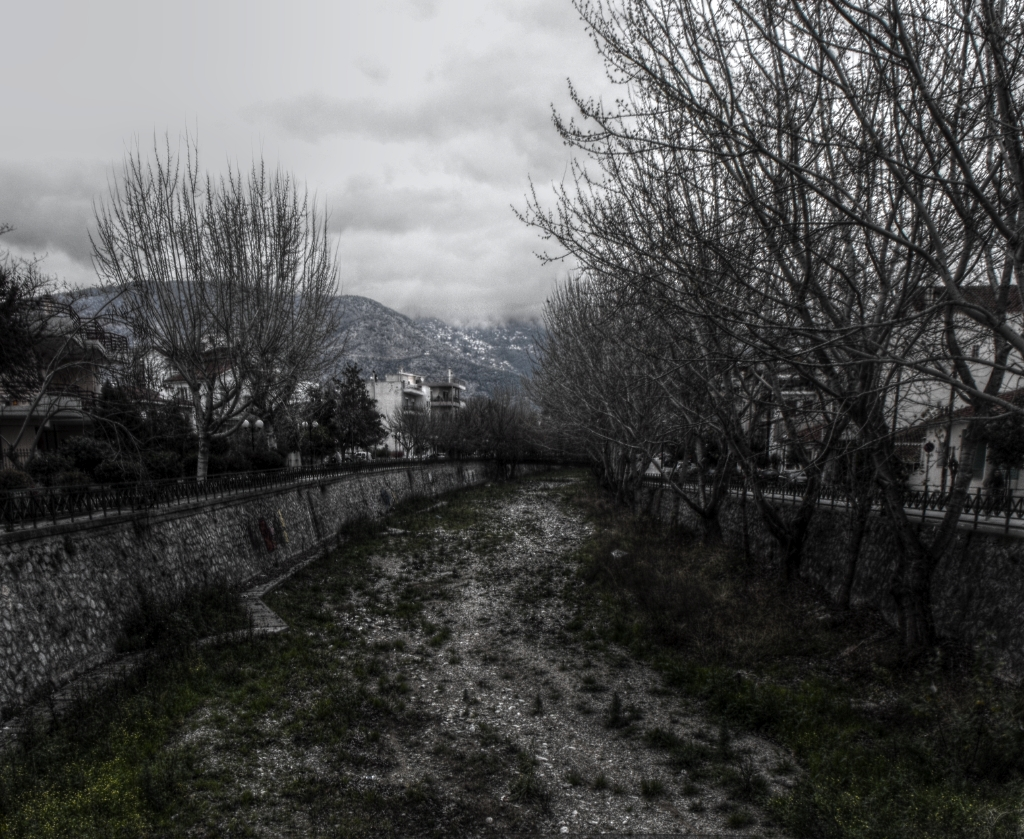
- The dry Krafsidonas, March 2011
- Native name: Κραυσίδωνας (Greek)

Location
- Country: Greece
- Region: Thessaly

Physical characteristics
- Source
  - location: Pelion mountain, Greece
  - elevation: 1,378 m (4,521 ft)
- Mouth
  - location: Aegean Sea, Pagasetic Gulf
  - coordinates: 39.3575°N 22.9335°E
- Length: 12 km (7.5 mi)

Basin features
- Municipalities: Volos

The Krafsidonas (Greek: Κραυσίδωνας) is, with a length of 12 kilometres (7.5 mi), the longest torrent that runs solely within the interior of Volos, Greece. It has its origin in the central Pelion Mountains, flowing southwest to the Pagasetic Gulf.

The places that the river flows through include Volos, Nea Ionia, Portaria in Greece. There are a number of bridges over the river.

== Floodings ==
The width of Krafsidonas' delta was significantly reduced from 1945, when the delta spanned 240 m, to 2023, when it reached only 40 m. Moreover, from the 1950s, there have been many construction works to straighten the Krafsidonas and turn it into a canal, narrowing down the torrent's outlet. As a result, floodings became more probable. Furthermore, many buildings have been constructed on the torrent's banks, placed in direct flooding danger. In 1988, there even was a proposal to turn the Krafsidonas into a road, but some locals protested, stopping the plan in its tracks.

=== October 10, 2006 ===
The city of Volos was flooded on October 10, 2006, one of the prefecture's worst recorded floods. The flood devastated crops and groves and many homes. A railroad bridge connecting Volos and Larissa collapsed when the central stone support was ruined by a combination of rocks, mud and debris carried by a swollen river. Almost one fifth of the city faced severe mudslides.

=== September 5, 2023 ===
Another significant flooding of the Krafsidonas stream occurred on the 5th of September 2023, as a result of the severe storm Daniel that hit parts of Greece, and especially Magnesia, causing many deaths and extensive damage to buildings, businesses and public infrastructure. The Krafsidonas destroyed part of Volos' nursing home and a wooden bridge connecting Volos to Nea Ionia, while carrying cars, buses, trees and other debris along its course.

=== September 27, 2023 ===
Just 22 days after the severe Mediterranean cyclone Daniel, the storm "Elias" hit Magnesia, leading to yet another flooding of the torrent which in itself caused extensive damage and floodings throughout the city of Volos.

== See also ==
- List of rivers of Greece
