= Elissonas (Corinthia) =

Location
- Country: Greece

Physical characteristics
- Source: Corinthia
- Mouth
  - location: Gulf of Corinth
  - coordinates: 38.0152°N 22.7486°E

The Elissonas (Greek: Ελισσώνας) or Helisson (Ancient Greek: Ἑλισσών) is a small river that flows entirely in the Sikyona municipality, in Corinthia, in the northeastern Peloponnese in Greece. The river begins near the village of Gonoussa and empties into the Gulf of Corinth near the centre of Kiato. The ancient city Sicyon was situated on a plateau between the rivers Asopus to the east and Helisson to the west.

== See also ==
- List of rivers in Greece
