= Peristeri (stream) =

- Native name: Περιστέρι (Greek)

Location
- Country: Greece
- Region: Messenia

Physical characteristics
- Source
  - location: Kyparissia Mountains
- Mouth
  - location: Ionian Sea
  - coordinates: 37.2919°N 21.6926°E

The Peristeri (Greek: Περιστέρι, literally "pigeon") is a small river in northwestern Messenia, in the western Peloponnese in Greece. It empties into the Ionian Sea.

== Geography ==
The main branch of the river has its source in the Kyparissia Mountains, near the village Tripyla. It flows to the northwest, and meets its main tributary 3 kilometres (1.9 mi) southwest of Kopanaki. The river continues to the west, and flows into the Gulf of Kyparissia, a bay of the Ionian Sea, in Kalo Nero.

== See also ==
- List of rivers in Greece
