= Rion Strait =

Strait connecting the gulfs of Corinth and Patras in Greece

Coordinates: 38°19′13″N 21°46′30″E

The Rion Strait (Greek: Στενό Ρίου) is a strait that connects the Gulf of Corinth with the Gulf of Patras (and hence the Ionian Sea). The strait is spanned by the Rio–Antirrio Bridge which connects the town of Rio on the south with the town of Antirrio on the north. The strait is also known as the Strait of Lepanto or the Rio–Antirio Strait.

== See also ==
- Euripus Strait
