= Jiaxing-Shaoxing Sea Bridge =

Jiaxing-Shaoxing Sea Bridge 嘉兴至绍兴跨海大桥
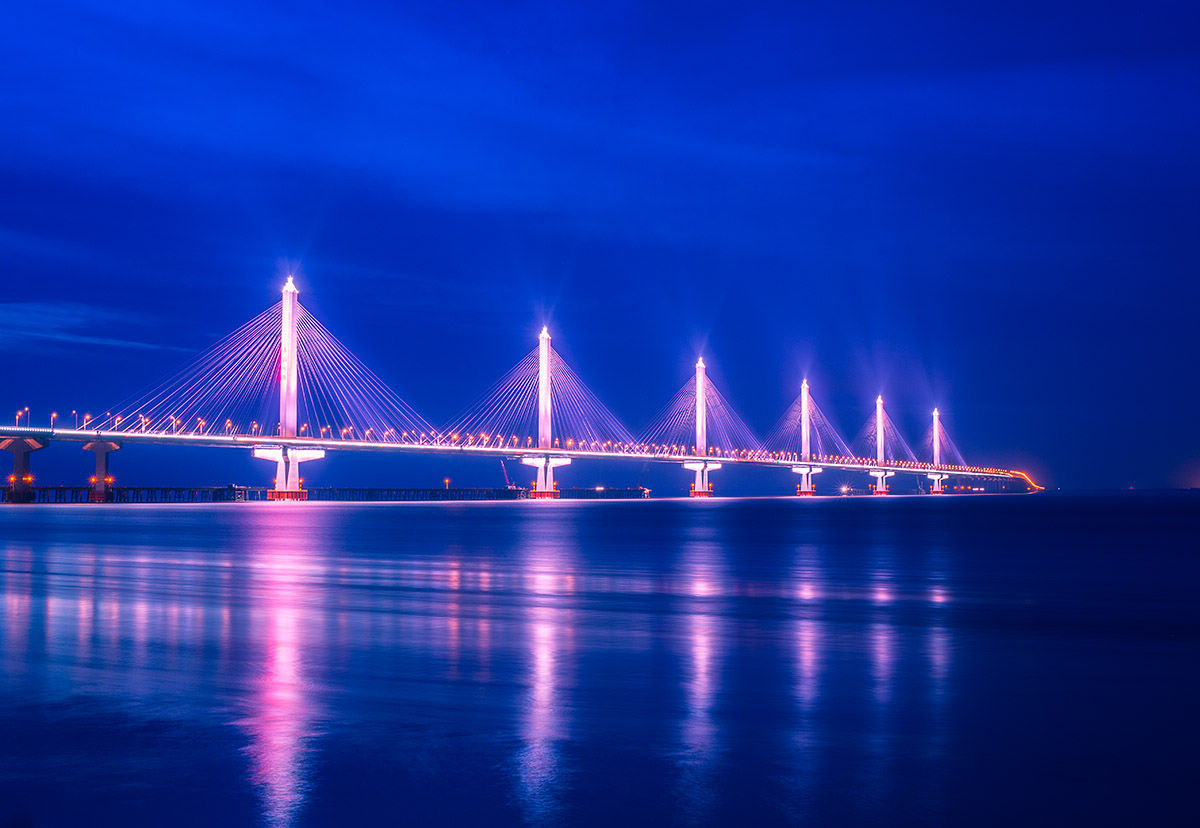
- The Jiashao Bridge
- Coordinates: 30.240587°N 120.776049°E
- Carries: 8 lanes of G15W expressway
- Crosses: Qiantang River estuary
- Locale: Shaoxing, Zhejiang, China
- Other name: Jiashao Bridge
- Owner: Zhejiang Jiashao Bridge Investment and Development Company

Characteristics
- Material: Steel and concrete
- Total length: 10,138 metres (33,261 ft)
- Width: 54.4 metres (178 ft)
- Longest span: 428 metres (1,404 ft)
- No. of spans: 5

History
- Constructed by: China Railway Baoji Bridge Group
- Construction start: December 2008
- Construction end: June 17, 2013
- Construction cost: ¥13.9 billion (US $2.23 billion)

Statistics
- Toll: 40 yuan

Location
- Interactive map of Jiaxing-Shaoxing Sea Bridge

The Jiaxing-Shaoxing Sea Bridge (simplified Chinese: 嘉绍跨海大桥; traditional Chinese: 嘉紹跨海大橋; pinyin: Jiā Shào Kuà Hǎi Dàqiáo), sometimes shortened to Jiashao Bridge, is the world's longest and widest multi-pylon cable-stayed bridge. From end to end, it stretches 10.14 km (6.3 mi) across the Qiantang River estuary, at Shaoxing, Zhejiang, China. The main bridge is 2,680 m (8,790 ft) long and 55.6 m (182 ft) wide and carries an expressway with eight traffic lanes. Construction started December 2008, and the toll bridge opened for traffic on July 20, 2013.

Jiashao is the second sea-crossing bridge built in the greater Hangzhou Bay area. It is about 50 km (31 mi) west of the longer 35.67 km (22.2 mi) Hangzhou Bay Bridge, which opened May 2008, a half year before construction began on the Jiashao.

== Design ==
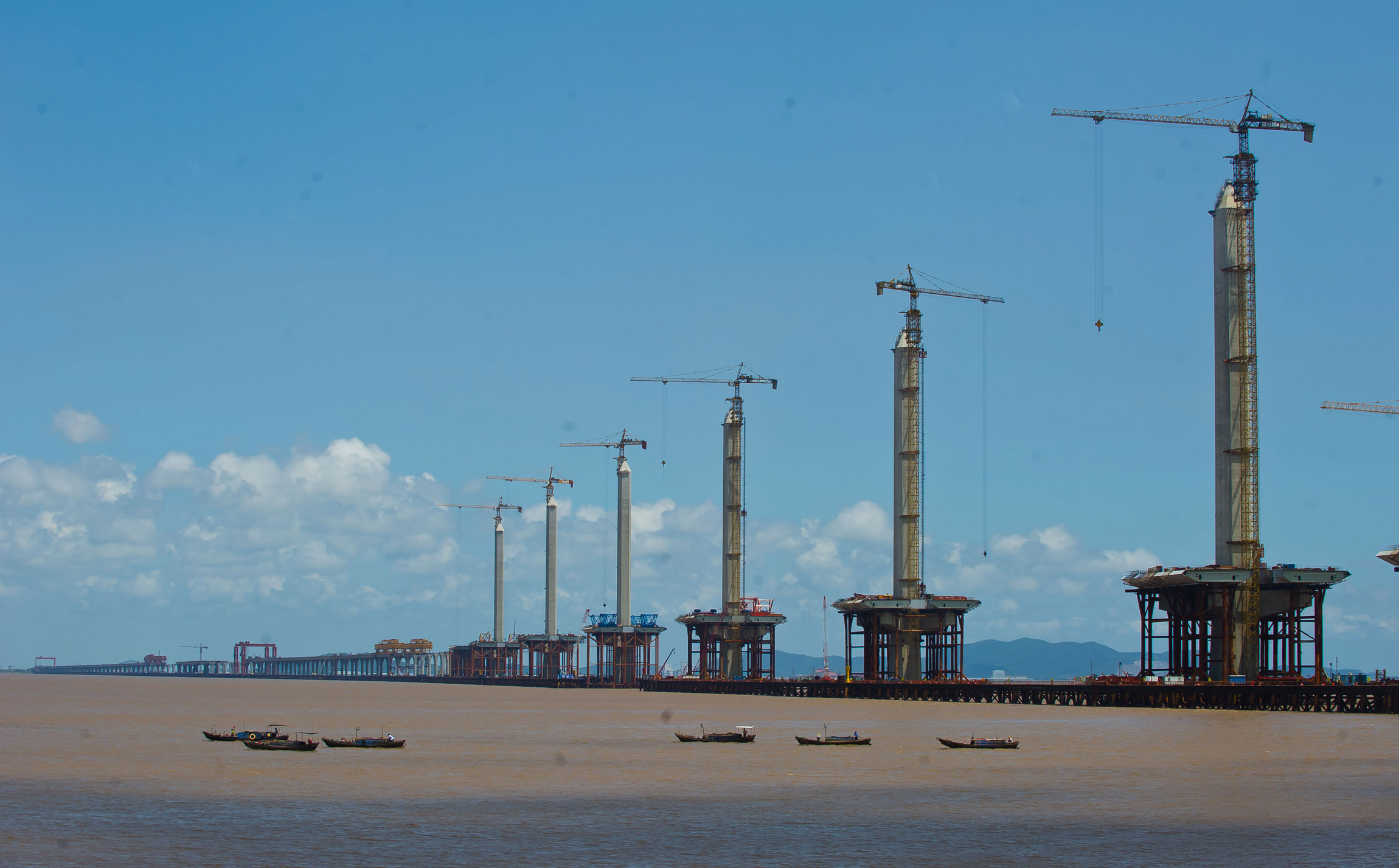
Jiashao Bridge, six pylons under construction, along with the northern approach

As with the Hangzhou Bay Bridge, the design of the Jiashao had to take into account the raging tidal bore and swift current of the Qiantang River estuary. To roll with the famous Qiantang tidal bore and to reduce the construction risks under difficult hydrologic conditions, the substructure foundation design for the southern and northern bridge approaches called for the elimination of the traditional pile cap and the use of a single pile and flexible column type with a large pile diameter of 3.8m and a very long pile length of 111m. This presented a relatively small water-blocking area for the 150 piles, which had a small influence on hydrology and avoided the risk of cofferdam construction from the tidal bore. For the main six-pylon bridge foundation, the large pile cap was moved down to below the mud surface of the riverbed, thus presenting only the single pylon column tied directly to the pile cap as the water-blocking area of each of the six main pylons of the cable-stayed bridge.

The main multi-span cable-stayed bridge is 2,680 m (8,790 ft) long from abutment to abutment and is mostly supported by six pylons, each with two sets of two-plane harps of cable stays to sustain two box-girder carriageways, one on either side of the pylons. The two box-girder carriageways are tied transversely to one another for stability and rigidity throughout the length of the main multi-span bridge, with a total main bridge steel box-girder deck width of 55.6 m (182 ft) carrying eight lanes of traffic.

The bridge crosses the estuary of Qiantang River, from the banks of north-east Shaoxing northward, making landfall south of Jiaxing. Shaoxing is located about 200 km from Shanghai. This bridge will provide a more direct route for vehicle traffic between Shanghai and Shaoxing. The bridge is intended for motorists travelling above speeds of 60 miles per hour; vehicles with a maximum speed of less than 45 miles per hour are not allowed to cross.

The Jiashao Bridge was given the IRF Award in 2016 and the FIDIC Award of Special Merit for 2017.

== See also ==
- Millau Viaduct
- Rio-Antirrio Bridge
- List of longest cable-stayed bridge spans
- List of tallest bridges in the world

== Sources ==
- Jiaxing-Shaoxing Cross Sea Bridge (Documentary) 嘉绍大桥 Wang, Rengui, engineer, is interviewed in this 2018 video, with English captions.
- cri.cn
- xinhuanet.com
- scmp.com
