= Kopanaki =

Kopanaki Κοπανάκι
- Settlement
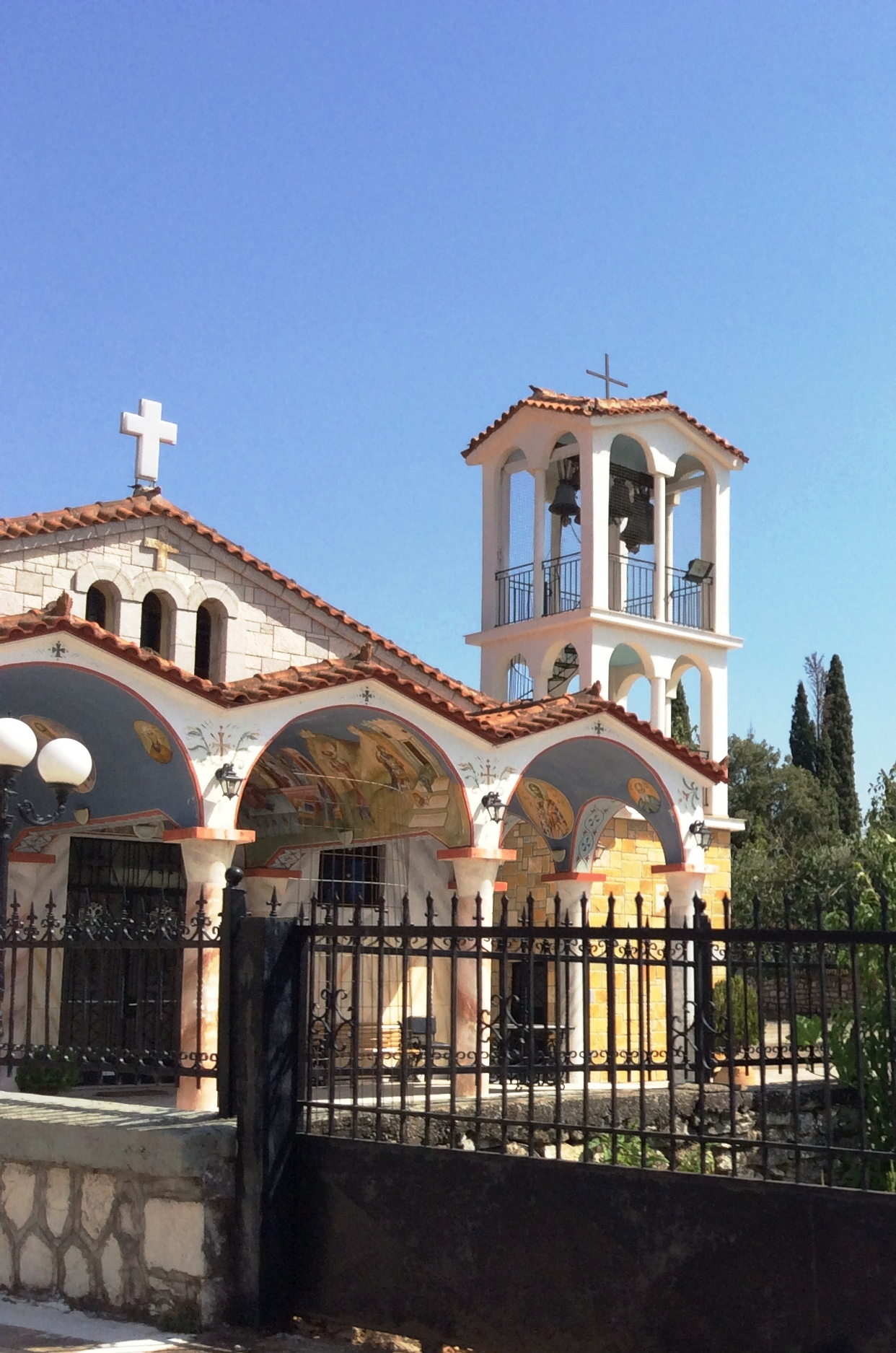
- Kopanaki

- Location within Greece
- Coordinates: 37°17′N 21°48′E
- Country: Greece
- Administrative region: Peloponnese
- Regional unit: Messenia
- Municipality: Trifylia
- Municipal unit: Aetos
- Elevation: 196 m (643 ft)

Population (2021)
  - Community: 913
- Time zone: UTC+2 (EET)
  - Summer (DST): UTC+3 (EEST)
- Postal code: 240 03
- Area code: 27650
- Vehicle registration: KM

Kopanaki (Greek: Κοπανάκι) is a town in northwestern Messenia, Peloponnese, Greece. It was the seat of the former municipality of Aetos and now it belongs to the municipality of Trifylia. Agriculture, specifically olive farming, is the main economic activity in the village. The community Kopanaki also includes the small villages Agios Dimitrios and Rizochori. Being the geographical and economic center of upper Trifylia, Kopanaki is well known for "pazari" (bazaar) or "agora", that takes place in the central square every Sunday since 1900 and attracts further population. The messenian tradition of baking "gournopoula" (pork) and selling it on the edge of the street started from this location, initially only on Sundays, for the visitors from far away, so they could have a hearty meal and the power to do the return trip. Today in many places of the region lying on main road someone can find (no matter the day) grilled gournopoula.

== Population ==
Year	Village population	Community population
1981	1,437	–
1991	1,282	–
2001	1,429	1,624
2011	931	1,042
2021	836	913

== Geography ==
Kopanaki is situated in the valley of a tributary of the small river Peristeri, between Tetrazio and Kyparissia mountains. It is 12 km east of Kalonero (on the Ionian Sea coast) and 39 km northwest of Kalamata. It is situated on the main road from Pyrgos and Kyparissia to Kalamata and on the metre gauge railway from Kalonero to Zevgolateio.

== History ==
The ruins of a very ancient agricultural settlement near Kopanaki have been excavated in 1980.

== People and Culture ==
- Panagiotis Meltemis, (1918–1978) (born Panagiotis K. Papadopoulos), poet and a newspaper editor.
- Panagiotis (Potis) Stratikis, (1926–2019), Greek Resistance member, writer, editor.
- Thanassis Spyropoulos, (1926–), puppet player (Karagiozis' shadow theatre)
- The town is home to a soccer team (see Messenia Football Clubs Association) known as Diagoras.

== See also ==
- List of settlements in Messenia
