= Rio–Antirrio Bridge =

Bridge in Western Greece

Rio–Antirrio Bridge Γέφυρα Ρίου–Αντιρρίου
- The bridge on a windy day
- Coordinates: 38°19′17″N 21°46′22″E
- Carries: A5 motorway, (E55/E65); 4 lanes, (2 lanes each way)
- Crosses: Gulf of Corinth
- Locale: Rio, Greece; Antirrio, Greece
- Official name: Charilaos Trikoupis Bridge
- Owner: Government of Greece
- Maintained by: Gefyra SA

Characteristics
- Design: Cable-stayed bridge by Berdj Mikaelian
- Total length: 2,880 meters (9,450 ft)
- Width: 27.2 meters (89 ft)
- Longest span: 560 meters (1,840 ft)

History
- Constructed by: Vinci SA-led consortium
- Fabrication by: Cleveland Bridge & Engineering Company
- Opened: 12 August 2004; 22 years ago

Statistics
- Daily traffic: Expected: 11,000 vehicles/day
- Toll: Cars: €15.90; Motorcycles: €2.50; Coaches: €37.80–81.40; Lorries: €24.70–50.90

Location
- Interactive map of Rio–Antirrio Bridge; Γέφυρα Ρίου–Αντιρρίου

The Rio–Antirrio Bridge (Greek: Γέφυρα Ρίου–Αντιρρίου), officially the Charilaos Trikoupis Bridge, is one of the world's longest multi-span cable-stayed bridges and longest of the fully suspended type. It crosses the Rion Strait between the Gulf of Corinth and Gulf of Patras, linking the town of Rio on the Peloponnese peninsula to Antirrio on mainland Greece by road. It opened one day before the Athens 2004 Summer Olympics, on 12 August 2004, and was used to transport the Olympic flame.

== Location ==
The 2,380-metre-long (7,810 ft; 1.48 mi) bridge dramatically improves access to and from the Peloponnese, which could previously be reached only by ferry or via the isthmus of Corinth in the east. Its width is 28 m (92 ft)—it has two vehicle lanes per direction, an emergency lane and a pedestrian walkway. Its five-span four-pylon cable-stayed portion of length 2,252 m (7,388 ft) is the world's third longest cable-stayed deck; only the decks of the Jiaxing-Shaoxing Sea Bridge in Shaoxing, China and the Millau Viaduct in southern France are longer at 10,138 m (33,261 ft) and 2,460 m (8,071 ft), respectively. However, as the former has a shorter length of main span (the length of the main span is the most common way to rank cable-stayed bridges, as the size of the main span does often correlate with the height of the towers, and the engineering complexity involved in designing and constructing the bridge) and as the latter is also supported by bearings at the pylons apart from cable stays, the Rio–Antirrio Bridge deck might be considered the longest cable-stayed "suspended" deck in the world.

This bridge is widely considered to be an engineering masterpiece, owing to several solutions applied to span the difficult site. These difficulties include deep water, insecure materials for foundations, seismic activity, the probability of tsunamis, and the expansion of the Gulf of Corinth due to plate tectonics.

== Construction ==
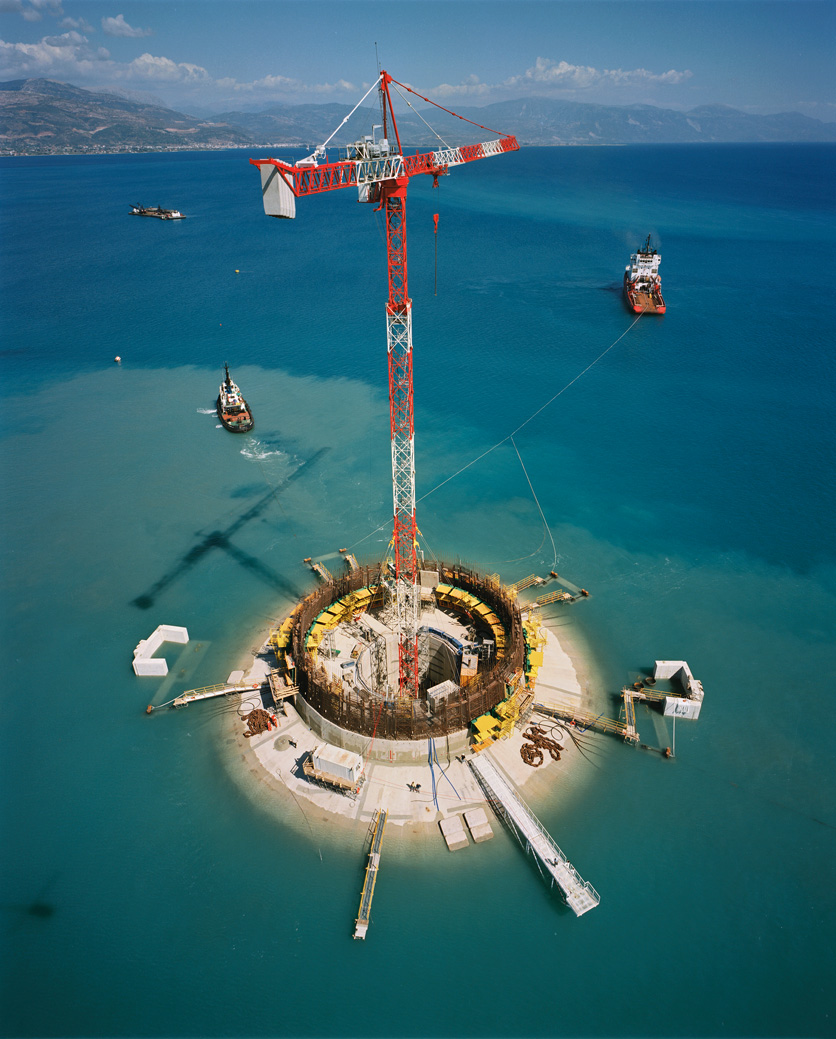
Pylon construction

Charilaos Trikoupis was a 19th-century prime minister of Greece who suggested building a bridge in the current location, but Greece's finances at the time didn't permit its construction.

The bridge was planned in the mid-1990s and was built by a French-Greek consortium led by the French group Vinci SA which includes the Greek companies Hellenic Technodomiki-TEV, J&P-Avax, Athena, Proodeftiki and Pantechniki. The consortium operates the bridge under concession under its ΓΕΦΥΡΑ or ΓαλλοΕλληνικός Φορέας Υπερθαλάσσιας ζεύξης Ρίου-Αντιρίου (GEFYRA—Greek for "bridge"—or GalloEllinikós Foréas Yperthalássias zéfxis Ríou-Antiríou, French-Greek Carrier of Oversea Connection of Rio–Antirrio) subsidiary. The suspension of the blue decorative lighting was announced by the company due to the ongoing electricity crisis in Europe but also to be in line with the company's environmental strategy. The bridge's carbon footprint has been reduced by 84.5% from 2015 to 2022.

The lead architect was Berdj Mikaelian. Site preparation and dredging began in July 1998, and construction of the massive supporting pylons in 2000. With these complete in 2003, work began on the traffic decks. Steel fabrication was undertaken by Cleveland Bridge & Engineering Company. On 21 May 2004 the main stage of construction was completed; only equipment (sidewalks, railings, etc.) and waterproofing remained to be installed.

The total cost of the bridge was about €630 million, funded by Greek state funds, the consortium, and loans by the European Investment Bank. It was finished ahead of its original schedule, which had foreseen completion between September and November 2004, and within budget. Other sources suggest the final cost was €839 million.

== Inauguration ==
The bridge was inaugurated on 7 August 2004, a week before the opening of the 2004 Summer Olympics in Athens. Olympic torchbearers were the first to officially cross it. One of them was Otto Rehhagel, the German football coach who won the Euro 2004 Championships for Greece. Another was Costas Laliotis, the former Minister of Public Works during whose term the project had begun.

== Engineering feats ==
Due to the peculiar conditions of the straits, several unique engineering problems needed to be considered and overcome. The water depth reaches 65m, the seabed is mostly of loose sediment, the seismic activity and possibility of tectonic movement is significant, and the Gulf of Corinth is expanding at a rate of 10-15mm a year. In addition, the hills on either side create a wind tunnel where 70 miles per hour (110 km/h) winds are common.

For these reasons, special design and construction techniques were applied. Beneath each pier the seabed was first reinforced and stabilized by driving 200 hollow steel pipes vertically into the ground. The pier footings were not buried into the seabed, but rather rest on a bed of gravel meticulously leveled to an even surface (a difficult endeavor at this depth). During an earthquake, the piers can move laterally on the sea floor with the gravel bed absorbing the energy. The bridge decking is connected to the pylons using jacks and dampers to absorb movement; too rigid a connection would cause the bridge structure to fail in the event of an earthquake and too much lateral leeway would damage the piers. There is also provision for the gradual widening of the strait over the lifetime of the bridge. Protection from the effect of high winds on the decking is provided by the use of aerodynamic spoiler-like fairing and on the cables by the use of spiral Scruton strakes.

Elevation chart of the bridge.

The bridge received the 2006 Outstanding Structure Award from the International Association for Bridge and Structural Engineering. In 2006 the bridge was featured in an episode of Megastructures on the National Geographic Channel. In 2011 the bridge returned to TV in an episode of Richard Hammond's Engineering Connections. In 2015, construction of the bridge was chronicled in the first episode of the Science Channel series Impossible Engineering.

== Trouble with cable links ==
On 28 January 2005, six months after the opening of the bridge, one of the cable links of the bridge snapped from the top of the M1 pylon and came crashing down on the deck. Traffic was immediately halted. The investigation found that a fire had broken out on the top of the M1 pylon after a lightning strike to one of the cables. The cable was immediately restored and the bridge reopened.

== Monitoring system ==
A structural health monitoring system was installed during construction on the bridge. Still operating, it provides a 24/7 surveillance of the structure. The system has more than 100 sensors, including:

- 3D accelerometers on the deck, pylons, stay cables, and on the ground to characterize wind movements and seismic tremors
- Strain gauges and load cells on the stay cables and their gussets
- Displacement sensors on the expansion joints to measure the thermal expansion of the deck
- Water-level sensors on the pylon bases to detect infiltration
- Temperature sensors in the deck to detect freezing conditions
- Linear variable differential transducer (LVDT) sensors on the stay cables to measure movement
- Load cells on the restrainers for recalibration in the event of an earthquake
- Two weather stations to measure wind intensity, direction, air temperature, and relative humidity

One specific element of the system is the ability to detect and specifically treat earthquake events.

== Photography ==
Photography by both professional and amateur photographers or cinematographers is allowed and encouraged by the bridge management without the need for a permit, with the bridge's management often organizing special events inviting professional and amateur photographers and cinematographers to photograph the bridge and the cars or the pedestrians using it.

== Gallery ==
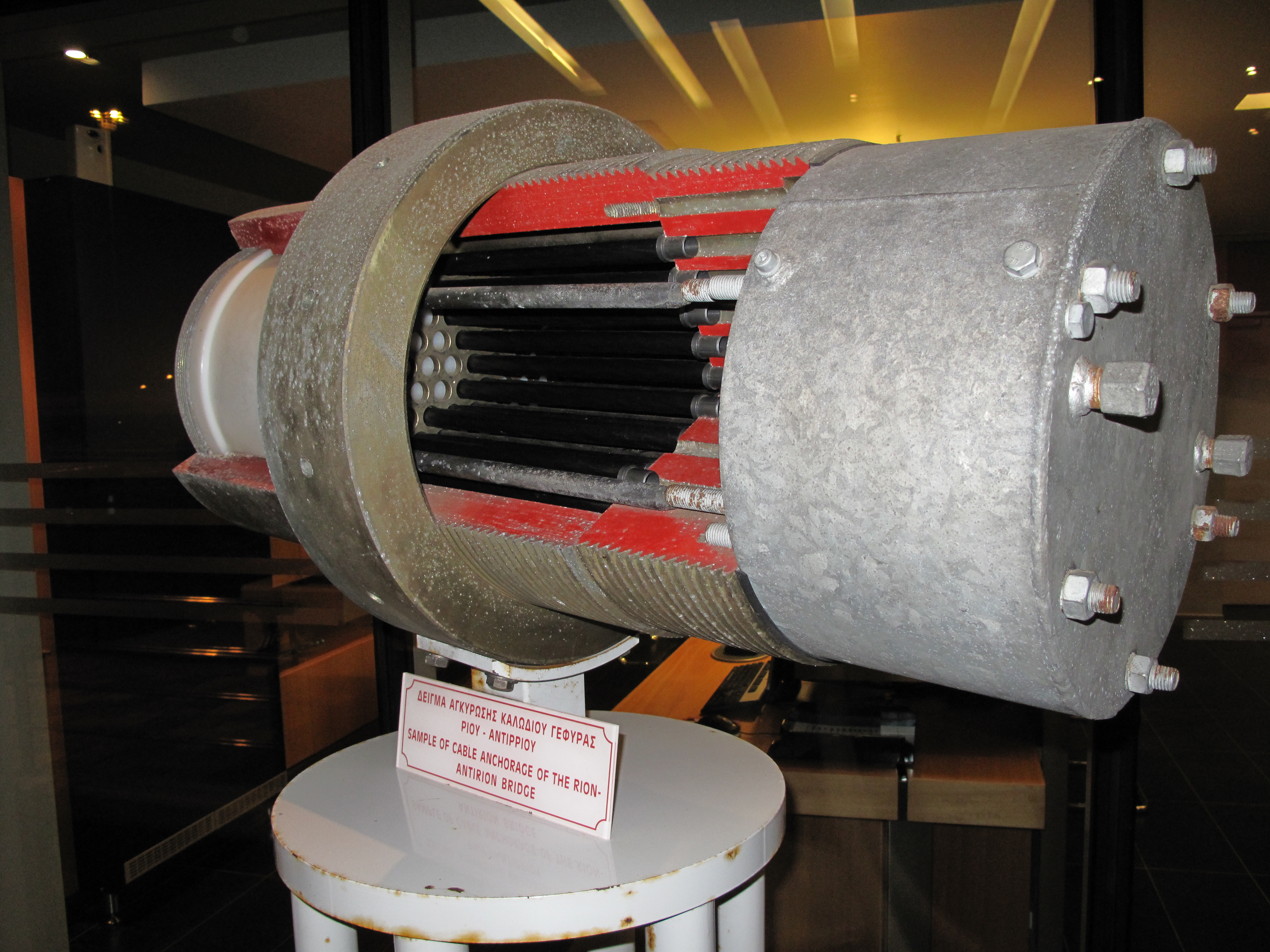
Sample of cable anchorage from the bridge museum in Antirrio.

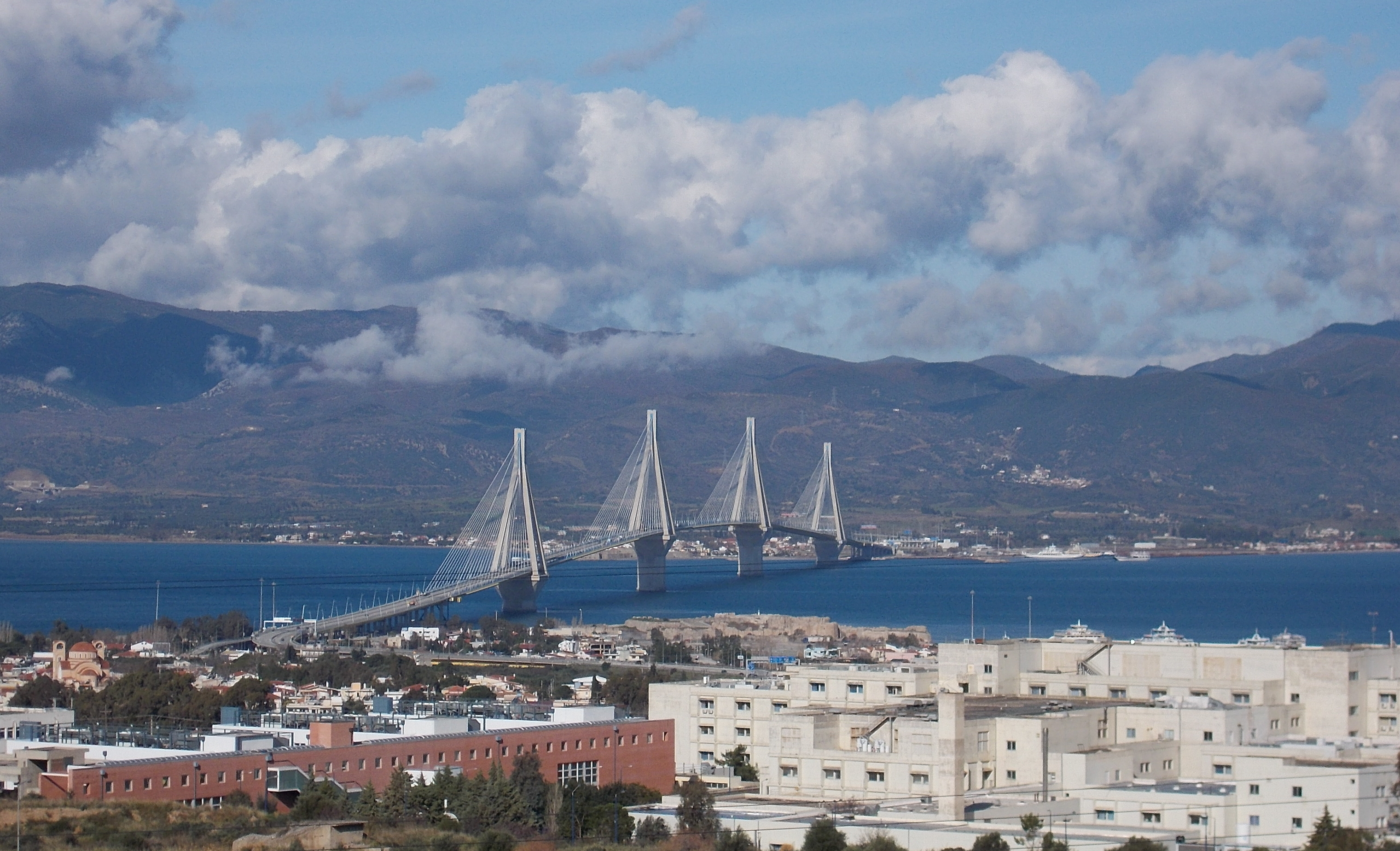
View from Rio.

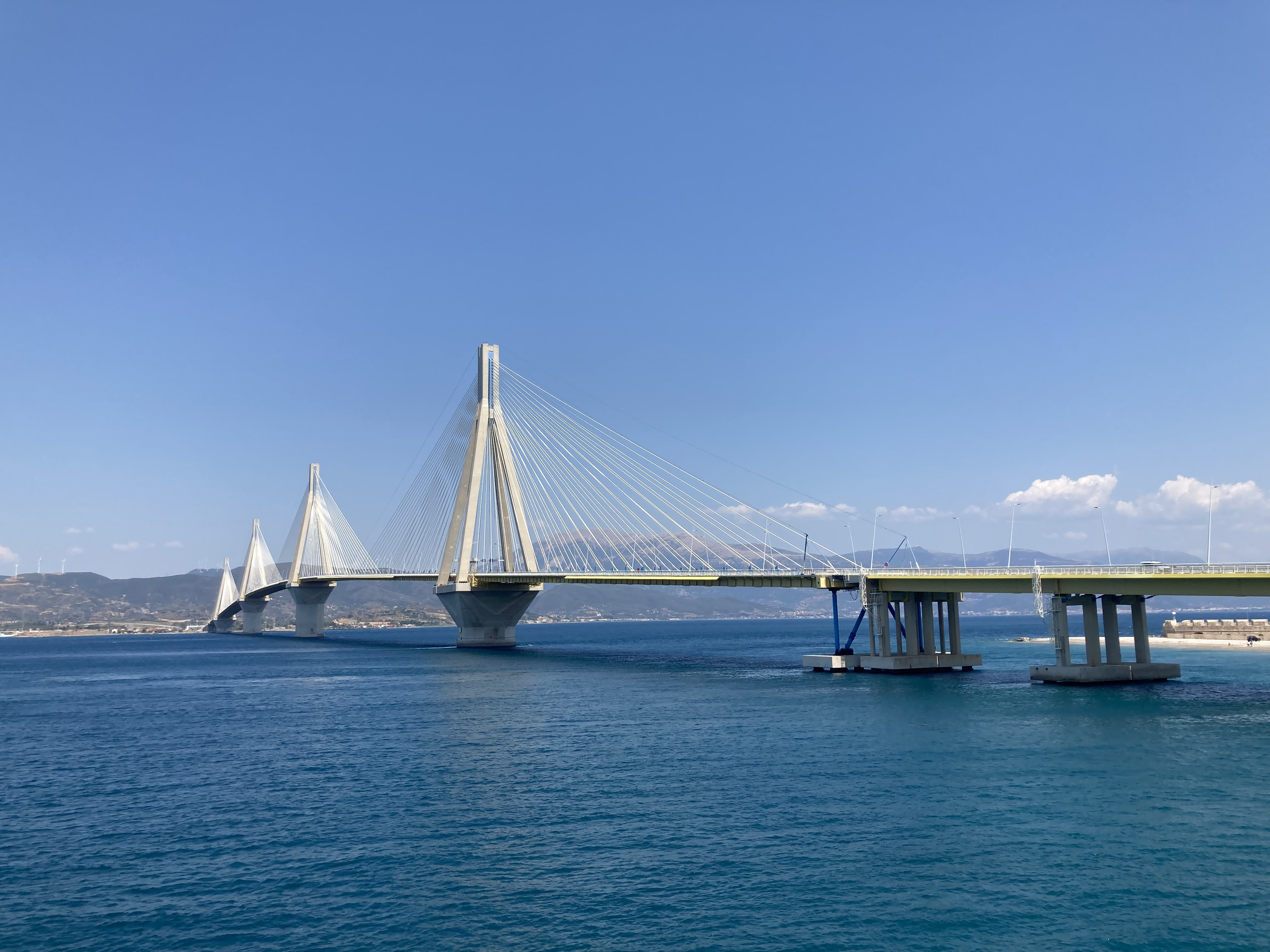
The Rio-Antirrio bridge from the ferry landing.

The Rio-Antirrio Bridge at sunset.

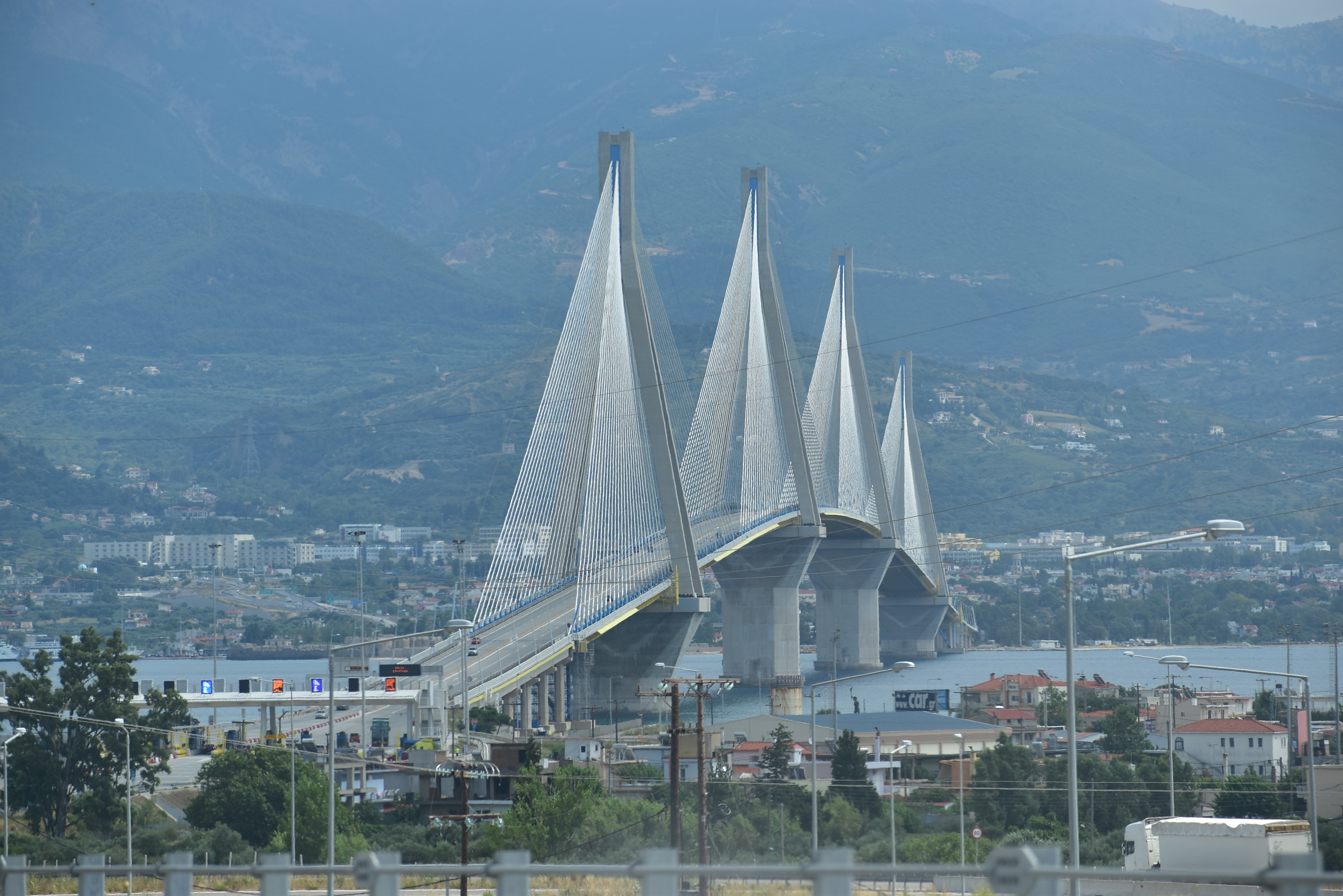
The bridge is quite narrow from some angles.

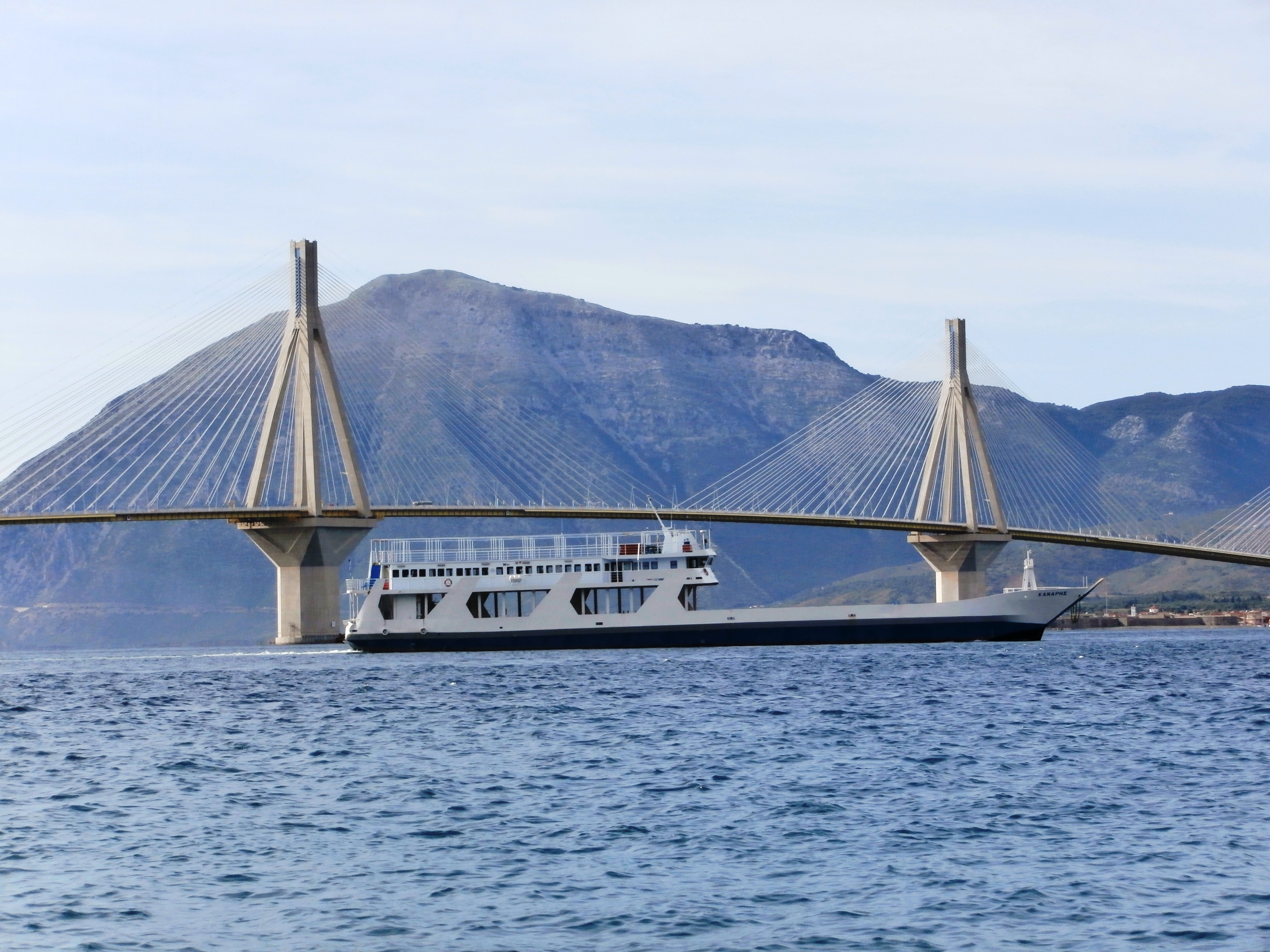
The Bridge with its ferry competition.

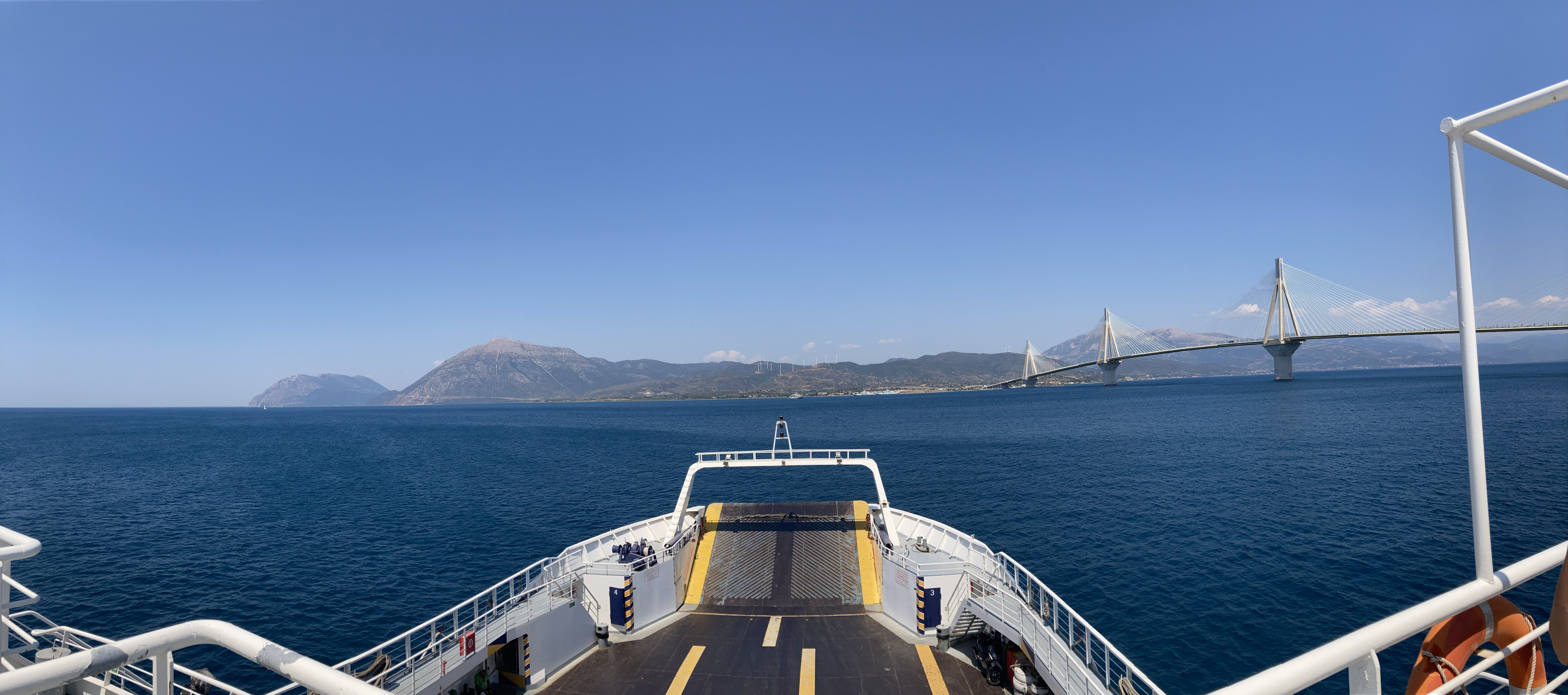
The Rio-Antirrio bridge from a ferry.

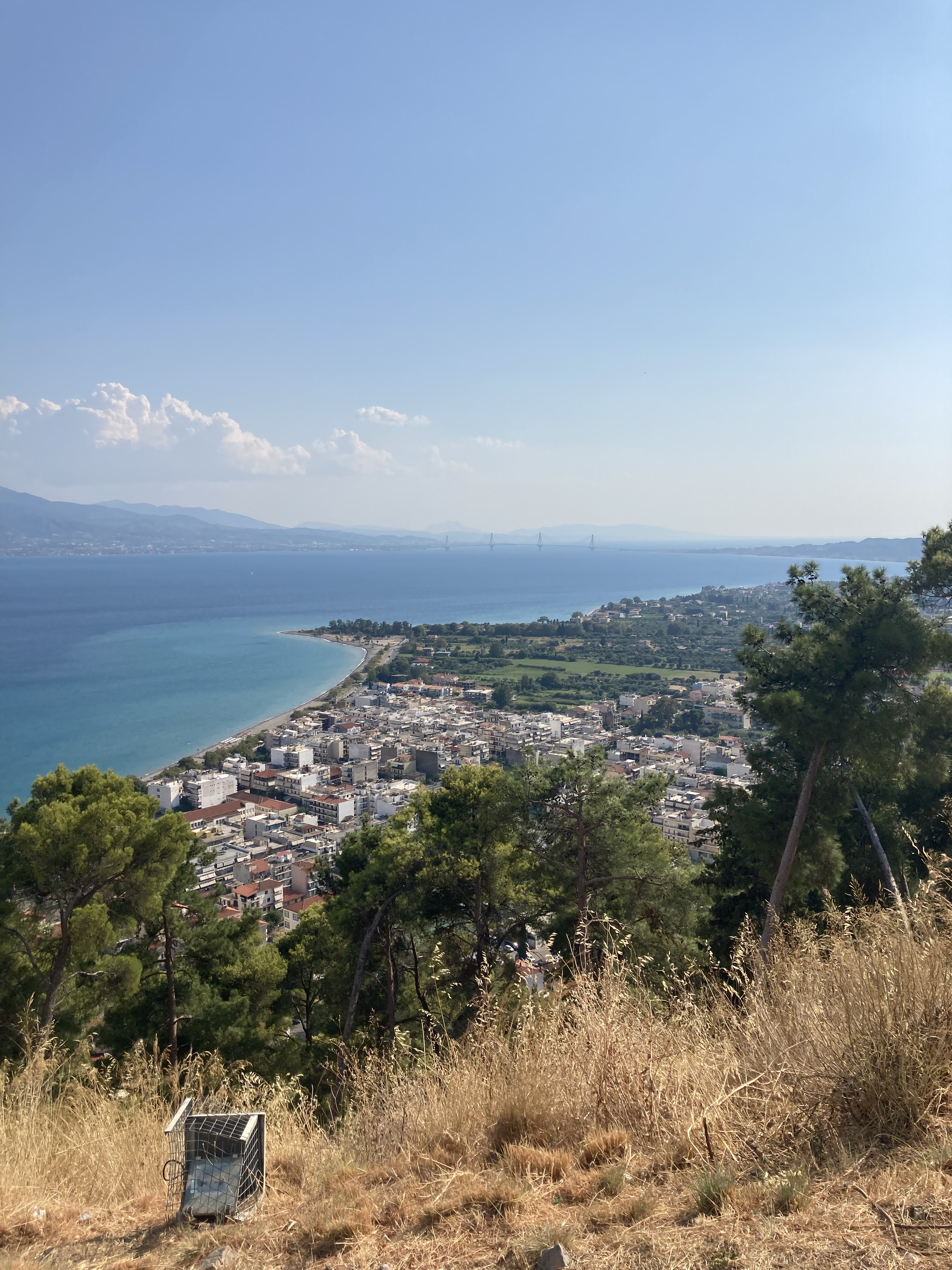
The bridge is a landmark and can be seen from far away. Here is the Rio-Antirrio bridge from Nafpaktos.

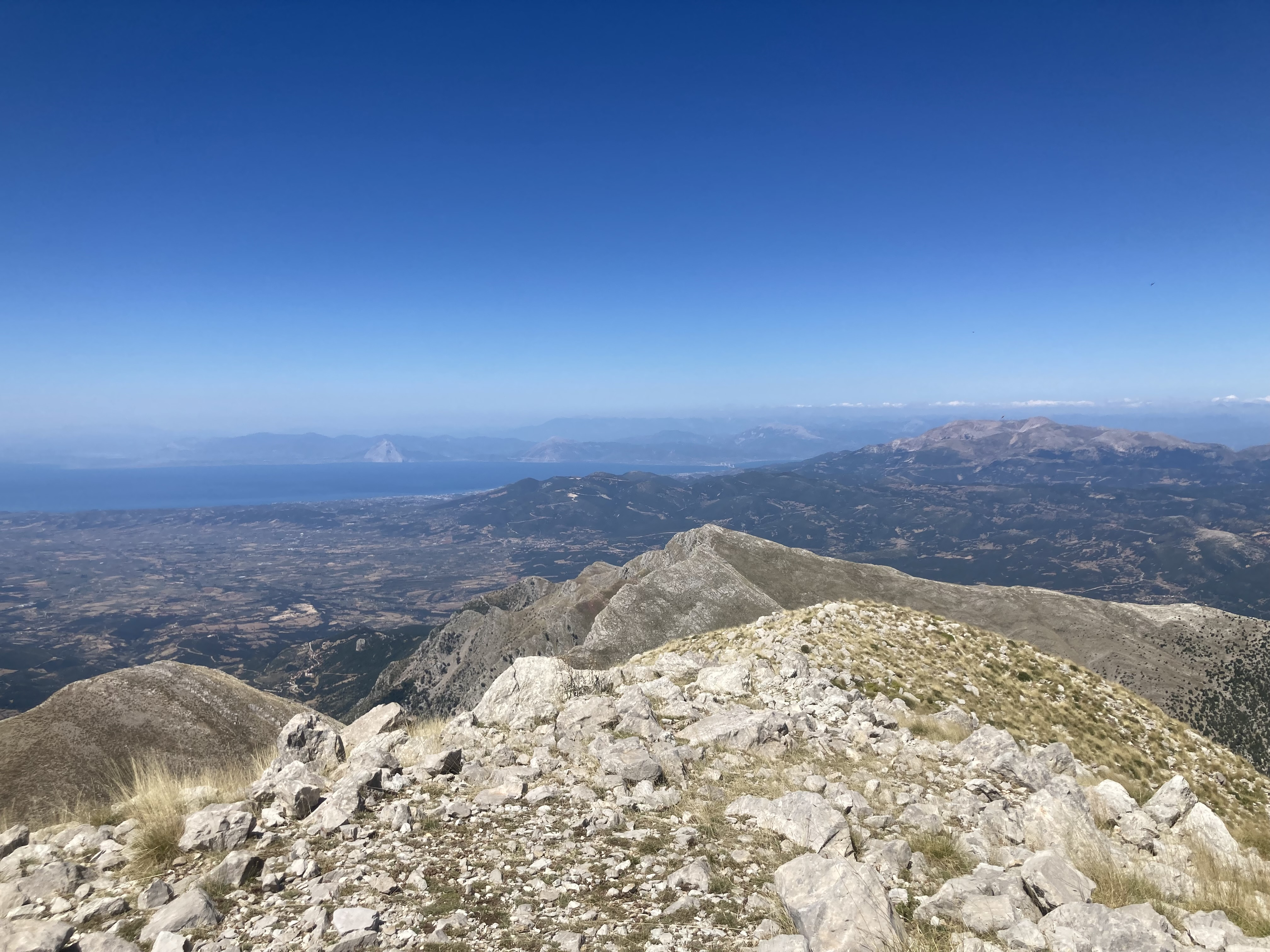
The bridge is visible from incredible distances. It is just observable from the top of Mount Erymanthos, Olenos Peak. Distance is about 21 miles.

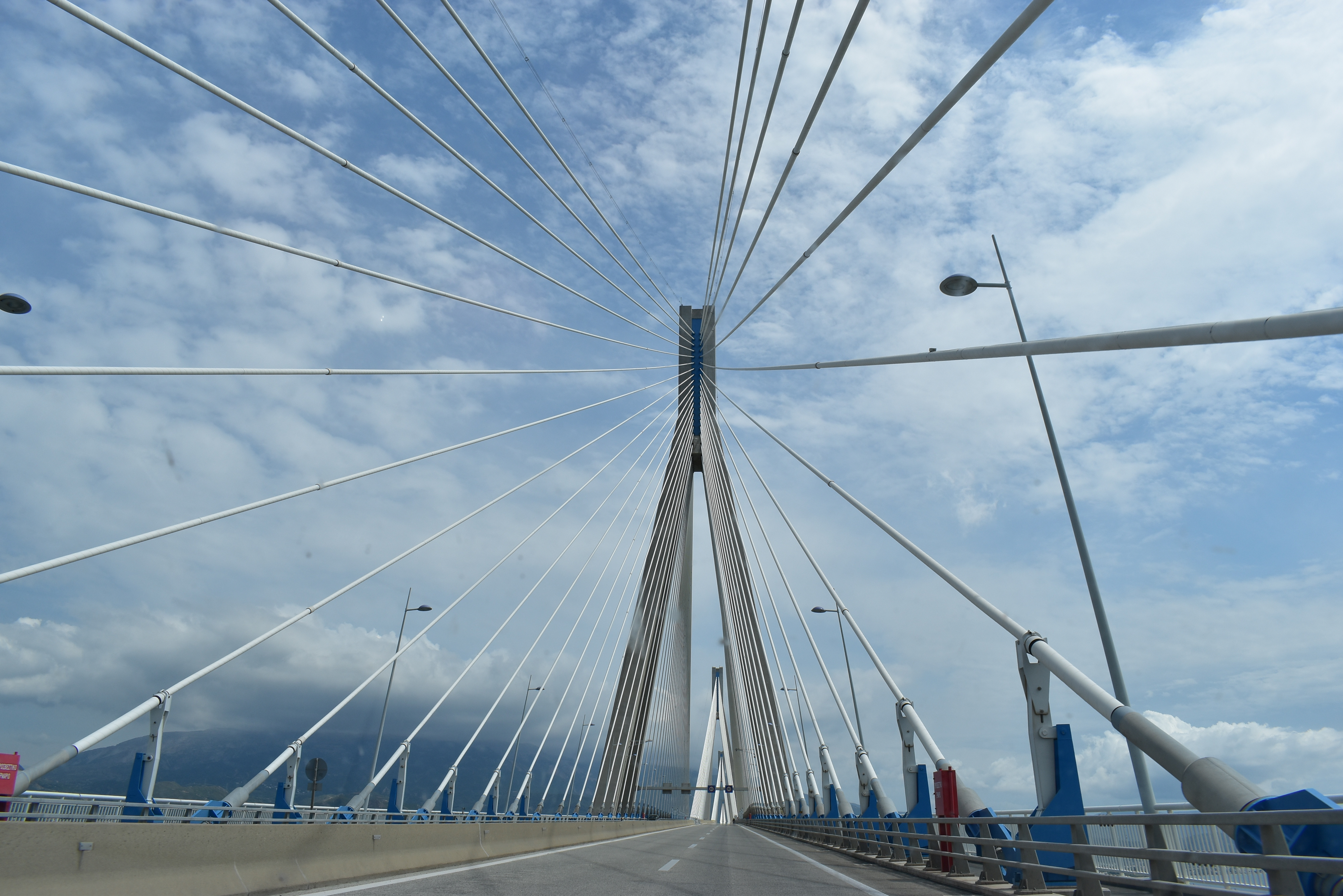
Driving along the Rio - Antirrio Bridge.
