= Chrysanthio =

Chrysanthio Χρυσάνθιο
- Community
- Location within Greece
- Coordinates: 38°6′N 22°20′E
- Country: Greece
- Administrative region: Western Greece
- Regional unit: Achaea
- Municipality: Aigialeia
- Municipal unit: Aigeira
- Elevation: 581 m (1,906 ft)

Population (2021)
  - Community: 176
- Time zone: UTC+2 (EET)
  - Summer (DST): UTC+3 (EEST)

Chrysanthio (Greek: Χρυσάνθιο, before 1957: Βερσοβά - Versova) is a village in the municipal unit of Aigeira, Achaea, Greece. It is located at an altitude of 581 m (1,906 ft).
