= Olvios =

Location
- Country: Greece
- Region: Corinthia

Physical characteristics
- Mouth
  - location: Feneos Plain
  - coordinates: 37.89°N 22.32°E
- Length: approx. 30 km (19 mi)

The Olvios (Greek: Όλβιος) is a river that flows through western Corinthia in the northern Peloponnese in Greece. The river empties into the Feneos plain, once an area of swamps, now containing farmlands. It is approximately 30 km long. The river begins on the Mavro Oros mountain, south of Evrostina. It flows to the southwest, between the Chelmos (Aroania) and Kyllini mountains. The river empties into the Feneos Fields northwest of the Oligyrtos mountains. One of its tributaries is the Doxa stream, that comes from the Chelmos mountains and flows through the artificial lake Doxa.

The Olvios flows along the villages of Karya, Kato Tarsos, Steno, Feneos, Goura and Mesino.

== See also ==
- List of rivers in Greece
