= Foinikas =

Foinikas may refer to:

- Foinikas, Crete
- Foinikas, Cyprus
- Foinikas, a village on the Greek island of Syros
- Foinikas (river)
