= Fonissa =

- Native name: Φόνισσα (Greek)

Location
- Country: Greece

Physical characteristics
- Source
  - location: western Corinthia
- Mouth
  - location: Gulf of Corinth
  - coordinates: 38.1010°N 22.5667°E
- Length: 13.3 km (8.3 mi)

The Fonissa (Greek: Φόνισσα) is a stream in western Corinthia, Peloponnese, Greece. It is 13.3 km (8.3 mi) long and flows into the Gulf of Corinth. The source of the river is in the hills near the village Rethi. It flows a southeasterly direction through a narrow gorge, and empties into the Gulf of Corinth between the villages Kato Loutro and Kamari, 6 km northwest of Xylokastro.

== Places along the river ==
- Rethi
- Dendro
- Amfithea
- Kato Loutro
- Kamari

== See also ==
- List of rivers in Greece
