= Alcyonides Islands =

Small island group in Greece

Alcyonides
Native name: Αλκυονίδες νήσοι Nickname: Good Islands
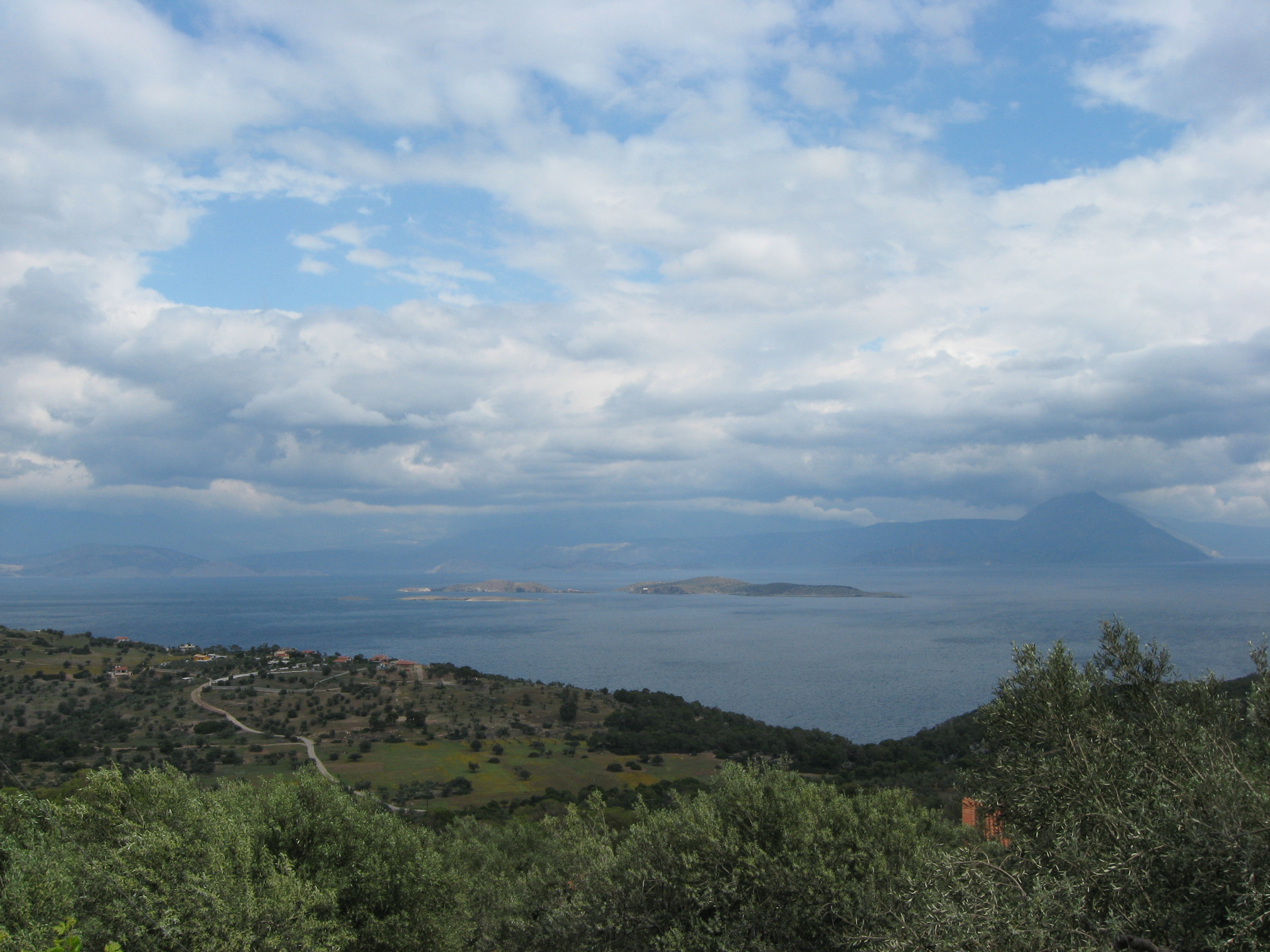
- View across the Gulf of Corinth toward the Alcyonides Islands
- Interactive map of Alcyonides
- Etymology: Daughters of Alcyoneus

Geography
- Location: Gulf of Corinth, Greece
- Total islands: 4

Administration
- Greece

The Alcyonides Islands (Greek: Αλκυονίδες νήσοι, romanized: Alkyonides nisoi), also known as the Good Islands, are a small group of four uninhabited islets in Greece, located in the eastern part of the Gulf of Corinth, within the Gulf of Livadostra, opposite Cape Olmion in the region of Corinthia. The group consists of the islands Zoodochos Pigi, Daskalio, Glaronisi, and Prasonisi.

The islets are the emergent peaks of a submerged landmass rising from a depth of approximately 190 metres. Geological evidence indicates that the landmass was uplifted by tectonic activity at an unknown time. The surrounding area is considered highly seismogenic and was the epicentral zone of the 1981 Gulf of Corinth earthquakes, which struck on 24 February 1981 with a magnitude of 6.7, causing significant damage and casualties in Athens.

The islands are arid and uninhabited, though small structures and fish farms are present. Archaeological remains of ancient settlements have been identified on some of the islets.

The name Alcyonides derives from Greek mythology, referring to the daughters of the giant Alcyoneus.

== Islands ==
Islands of the Archipelago
Name	Name in Greek	Area (km²)
Prasonisi	Πρασονήσι	–
Glaronisi	Γλαρονήσι	0.10
Daskalio	Δασκαλειό	0.218
Zoodochos Pigi	Ζωοδόχος Πηγή	0.702
