= Aigeira =

Aigeira Αιγείρα
- Municipal unit
- Location within the regional unit

- Location within Greece
- Coordinates: 38°9′N 22°21′E
- Country: Greece
- Administrative region: West Greece
- Regional unit: Achaea
- Municipality: Aigialeia
- Districts: 11

Area
  - Municipal unit: 103.65 km^{2} (40.02 sq mi)
- Elevation: 10 m (33 ft)

Population (2021)
  - Municipal unit: 2,293
  - Municipal unit density: 22.12/km^{2} (57.30/sq mi)
  - Community: 1,309
- Time zone: UTC+2 (EET)
  - Summer (DST): UTC+3 (EEST)
- Postal code: 250 10
- Area code: 26960
- Vehicle registration: ΑΧ
- Website: www.aigeira.gr aigeira.org, [English]

Aigeira (Greek: Αιγείρα) (IPA: [eˈʝira], Ancient Greek: Αἰγείρα or Αἴγειρα, Latin: Aegeira) is a town and a former municipality in northeastern Achaea, West Greece, Greece. Since the 2011 local government reform it has been a municipal unit of the Aigialeia municipality, with an area of 103.646 km^{2}. The municipal unit stretches from the Gulf of Corinth, where the town of Aigeira is located, to the mountains in the south. The town of Aigeira is 26 km (16 mi) southeast of Aigio, 55 km (34 mi) northwest of Corinth and 55 km (34 mi) east of Patras.

The archaeological site of ancient Aigeira is located approximately 6 km (3.7 mi) from the modern town. It is an important site for the Mycenaean and later periods, with particularly extensive remains from the Hellenistic period. It has been excavated since 1916 by archaeologists from the Austrian Archaeological Institute at Athens.

== History ==
=== Prehistory ===
(Location of the ancient site: 38°07′43″N 22°22′41″E)

Table showing the major periods of the Helladic Chronology used in this article, as well as their approximate chronological dates.
Period	Approximate Date
Middle Neolithic	c.5800–c.4500 BC
Final Neolithic	c.4500–c.3100 BC
Early Helladic I	c.3100–c.2700 BC
Early Helladic II	c.2700 –c.2200 BC
Early Helladic III	c.2200–c.2000 BC
Middle Helladic I	c.2000–c.1900 BC
Middle Helladic II	c.1900–c.1700 BC
Middle Helladic III	c.1700–c.1600BC
Late Helladic I	c.1600–c.1450 BC
Late Helladic II	c.1450–c.1400 BC
Late Helladic IIIA	c.1400–c.1300 BC
Late Helladic IIIB	c.1300–c.1180 BC
Late Helladic IIIC	c.1180–c.1050 BC

Settlement at Aigeira is known from the Middle Neolithic and Final Neolithic, beginning around 5500 BCE. The first settlement was situated on the acropolis, and has furnished evidence of pottery, including vessels likely used in the production of cheese. A small quantity of obsidian blades, using material from Melos, have also been found from this period. Some evidence of Neolithic settlement has been found on a lower plateau, approximately 150m to the east of the acropolis.

Patterns of settlement around the Gulf of Corinth in the Final Neolithic show a few 'main sites' and a much greater number of apparently transient settlements, used only briefly before abandonment. In the Early Helladic period (beginning around 3100 BCE), settlements appear to become more permanent, being used over multiple chronological phases, and to be involved in more intense contacts between each other, particularly maritime exchange. While there is a great deal of evidence for social and cultural continuity at Aigeira between the Final Neolithic and Early Helladic, particularly as concerns patterns of food production and consumption, there are also signs of technological development, particularly in higher-temperature ceramic production, the use of flax or double fibres in textiles, and possibly the addition of arsenic to copper in metallurgy.

In the EH II period, the acropolis site was abandoned, and settlement moved to a low-lying and more fertile site at Kassaneva, close to the Krios river. The acropolis was re-occupied in the Middle Helladic period: little evidence of this phase survives, though what does exist points to new cultural connections with the western Peloponnese.

Relatively little is known of Aigeira for most of the Late Helladic period. Aigeira has been proposed as the centre of one of two putative Mycenaean states in Achaia, but no signs of palatial structures or administration have been found at the site, making it difficult to argue that Aigeira was the centre of the sort of state apparatus seen in contemporary palatial centres like Mycenae or Pylos. Indeed, the relatively low level of monumentality found in tombs and buildings at this period suggests that local elites, while undoubtedly evidenced from the use of chamber tombs, did not possess the ability to mobilise even relatively small amounts of skilled labour, unlike the contemporary palatial elites elsewhere. Furthermore, the lack of tholos tombs in the vicinity, which are closely associated with palatial elites at other Mycenaean sites, lacks a conclusive explanation: it has been argued that this situation may represent the lack of penetration of palatial social structures and ideology into Achaea, or perhaps that distant centres, such as Mycenae and Aegina, were able to inhibit the growth of Achaean elites, if not to control them directly.

Only a few pieces of pottery are known from the LH IIIB period, mostly found on the terraces below the acropolis, and it is possible that the settlement moved to another location, perhaps nearer the coast, during LH IIIB, returning to its original location early in LH IIIC.

In the LH IIIC period, the settlement appears to have been destroyed by fire, and rebuilt soon after. Of particular note in this phase is the substantial fortification wall constructed on the eastern side of the new settlement – the only such structure known from this period on the Greek mainland, and one of only two contemporary examples known in the Aegean (alongside Naxos). Unusually for Aegean sites in this period, LH IIIC appears to have been a time of sustained occupation, growth and prosperity: excavations between 2011 and 2016 found evidence of a 'lower town', approximately 12,000m^{2} in area, centred on the acropolis and occupied over numerous chronological phases in LH IIIC. The distributions of finds of pottery, particularly pithoi, led excavators to conclude that this was a settlement composed of households, characterised by the storage and production of goods as well as feasting. A 'cult room' for religious purposes also dates to this period. Evidence of pottery practices suggests a degree of cultural continuity with the pre-destruction era, with characteristic Mycenaean shapes continuing to be manufactured.

Tombs associated with Aigeira have been found dating to the early part of Late Helladic III, including chamber tombs excavated by the Greek archaeologist Nikolaos Verdelis in 1956 at Lykovouno/Derveni, approximately 1.2 km southeast of the settlement. In LH IIIC, these tombs continued to be re-used, but some innovations in funerary practice are observed: instead of re-opening the chambers and interring new bodies, rectangular trenches, known as 'dormitories', were dug into the floors of the tombs.

=== Classical and Hellenistic Periods ===
Like many Aegean sites, Aigeira was abandoned at the end of the Bronze Age, following the destruction of the site at the end of LH IIIC Middle. Occupation began again in the second half of the 8th century BCE, likely associated with the sanctuary at the site, and included areas of the 'lower town' previously occupied in LH IIIC. Some partial fortifications are known from the Archaic period, covering an area of around 3.5 hectares.

In the Iliad, Aigeira was known as Hyperesia. In the 2nd century CE, Pausanias recorded a story of how the town came to change its name:

The present name was given to [Aigeira] by the Ionian settlers for the following reason. A hostile band of Sicyonians was going to invade their land. And they, not thinking themselves a match for the Sicyonians, collected together all the goats [aiges] in the country, and fastened torches to their horns, and directly night came on lit these torches. And the Sicyonians, who thought that the allies of the Hyperesians were coming up, and that this light was the campfires of the allied force, went home again: and the Hyperesians changed the name of their city because of these goats, and at the place where the goat that was most handsome and the leader of the rest had crouched down there they built a temple to Artemis the Huntress, thinking that this stratagem against the Sicyonians would not have occurred to them but for Artemis.

— Pausanias, Description of Greece 7.26, trans. Richard Shilletto (1886)

Pausanias relates that the old name of 'Hyperesia' continued in use: indeed, he elsewhere records that Icarus of Hyperesia was proclaimed victor in the 23rd Olympiad in 688 BC; Eusebius refers his name as Icarius., while Cratinus, the winner of the Olympic prize for boys' wrestling in 260 BC, is named as a citizen of 'Aigeira'.

Aigeira was a member of the Achaean League during its first period of existence in the early fourth century BCE, and again when it was re-founded in 284 BCE, after collapsing shortly after 323 BCE. During this period, probably early in the 4th century, the nearby town of Aigai appears to have been abandoned or become depopulated, and its citizens incorporated into the citizen body of Aigeira. Perhaps in commemoration of this, the coins of Aigeira began to use the symbol of a goat, previously used in the coinage of Aigai, and continued to do so throughout the Classical and Hellenistic periods.

The Hellenistic period appears to have been a time of great growth, with the size of the settlement increasing by as much as fourteen times, perhaps owing to money from the Achaean League. The city was re-fortified in this period with a circuit wall, which encompassed around 50 ha. Excavations in the later 20th century uncovered a building complex, known as the 'guest house', dating approximately to the mid-4th century BCE. This building included mosaic flooring and has been suggested to have been a residence for foreign diplomatic delegations. It was used until the 1st century BCE, by which point it had been extended and modified multiple times and occupied a surface area around 1,000 m^{2}.

Around 280 BCE, the theatre was built, along with an adjacent naiskos. Throughout the Hellenistic period, the area of the theatre became the central point for public building, and further structures, including a temple dedicated to the goddess Tyche, were added. To this period also belong the 2nd-century-BCE fragments of a colossal statue of Zeus, sculpted by the Athenian sculptor Eucleides, now held in the National Archaeological Museum in Athens and once displayed in a temple of Zeus. Other temples in the upper town included a temple of Apollo and temples of Artemis Agrotera and of Aphrodite Urania, and of the Syrian Goddess. According to Pausanias, Serapis and Isis were also worshipped in the city, pointing to contact with Ptolemaic Egypt.

Along with the other members of the Achaean League, Aigeira fought alongside Philip V of Macedon against the Aetolian League in the Social War of 220-217 BCE. In the early stages of the war, in 219 BCE, the city was attacked and temporarily occupied by Aetolian forces, who had set sail from the opposite town of Oeantheia in Locris. A hoard of nearly 600 silver coins, found in the so-called 'guest house' has been conjectured to have been hidden there in the course of this raid.

By the 2nd century CE, when Pausanias visited, the city consisted of two parts, both known as 'Aigeira': a port on the Gulf of Corinth and the upper town, 12 stadia (2 km (1.2 mi)) from the port. Between around 150 CE and 250 CE, the natural harbour was supplemented with concrete constructions, particularly two breakwaters built in opus caementicium. It is possible that earlier harbour structures existed, since obscured by the Roman construction and later seismic activity.

Aigeira continued to be occupied throughout the Roman period, and new structures were built into Late Antiquity, sometimes re-using spolia from older buildings.

In the 3rd century CE, a massive seismic uplift left the harbour structures approximately four metres above sea level, rendering the port unusable; this event may be connected with a third-century earthquake which destroyed the city itself. Aigeira underwent a period of decline in the 4th and 5th century CE, with an apparent fall in population and the conversion of many formerly public buildings and temples into workshops.

=== Medieval Period ===
The acropolis continued to be occupied until at least the 12th century, as attested by finds of coins and pottery; a new conduit for water was built at some point during this period. Some time in the medieval period, the site was re-fortified with a perimeter wall incorporating many ancient spolia, which likely dates to approximately the 11th-12th centuries.

=== Modern times ===
Around 1900, the so-called 'Houses of the Raisin-Pickers' were built, using spolia from the ancient city, which appears by this time to have been in use as a large quarry.

== Archaeology ==
Early excavations at Aigeira were often partial and patchily recorded. In the late 19th century, the Greek archaeologist Valerios Stais uncovered an inscription bearing part of Diocletian's Edict on Maximum Prices, issued in 301 CE, though he did not record either the precise circumstances or the location of the finds. During his survey of the Peloponnese in 1836, William Martin Leake discovered the remains of the harbour at a small cove then known as Mavra Litharia, but they attracted little archaeological attention until the 1990s. In 1904, Hans Schrader acquired objects from a Mycenaean grave with 'Aigeira' listed as the find-spot, but the excavation that produced these has gone unrecorded.

The first formal excavations took place in 1916 and 1925 under Otto Walter and the Austrian Archaeological Institute in Vienna. Walter discovered the Hellenistic theatre, as well as three naiskoi in the area.

In 1972, excavations resumed under Wilhelm Alzinger, who led them until 1988. Alzinger's excavations focused on the acropolis, the theatre, the ruins of the temple of Zeus and the space between the theatre and the temple of Zeus. Several further naiskoi were discovered near the theatre, including one with a pebble floor mosaic representing an eagle with a serpent, as well as the Tycheion (sanctuary of Tyche) described by Pausanias. Between 1975 and 1980, much of the 'lower town' was also uncovered. During Alzinger's tenure, Sigrid Deger-Jalkotzy worked on the excavations from 1975 to 1986, primarily analysing and publishing the late Mycenaean pottery.

Excavations between 1990 and 1997, under Anton Bammer, focused on a survey of the urban area and investigated, inter alia, the water supply and public spaces of the city. Georg Ladstätter lead the excavations from 1998, with continued focus on the water supply and on domestic buildings.

Since 2002, excavations have been under the jurisdiction of the Austrian Archaeological Institute at Athens. In 2007, the so-called 'prehistoric layer' was uncovered and defined, providing the first proof of habitation at Aigeira before the Bronze Age. From 2011 until 2018, excavations took place in the theatre, under the direction of Walter Gauss.

== Subdivisions ==
The municipal unit of Aigeira is subdivided into the following communities:

- Aigeira
- Aiges
- Ampelokipoi
- Chrysanthio
- Exochi
- Monastiri
- Oasi
- Perithori
- Seliana
- Sinevro
- Vella

== Historical population ==
Year	Community	Municipal unit
1981	1,320	-
1991	1,696	4,211
2001	1,673	4,503
2011	1,462	2,626
2021	1,309	2,293

== Sport ==
The town is home to the Aigeira Municipal Stadium, which features an artificial turf pitch and a gravel running track.

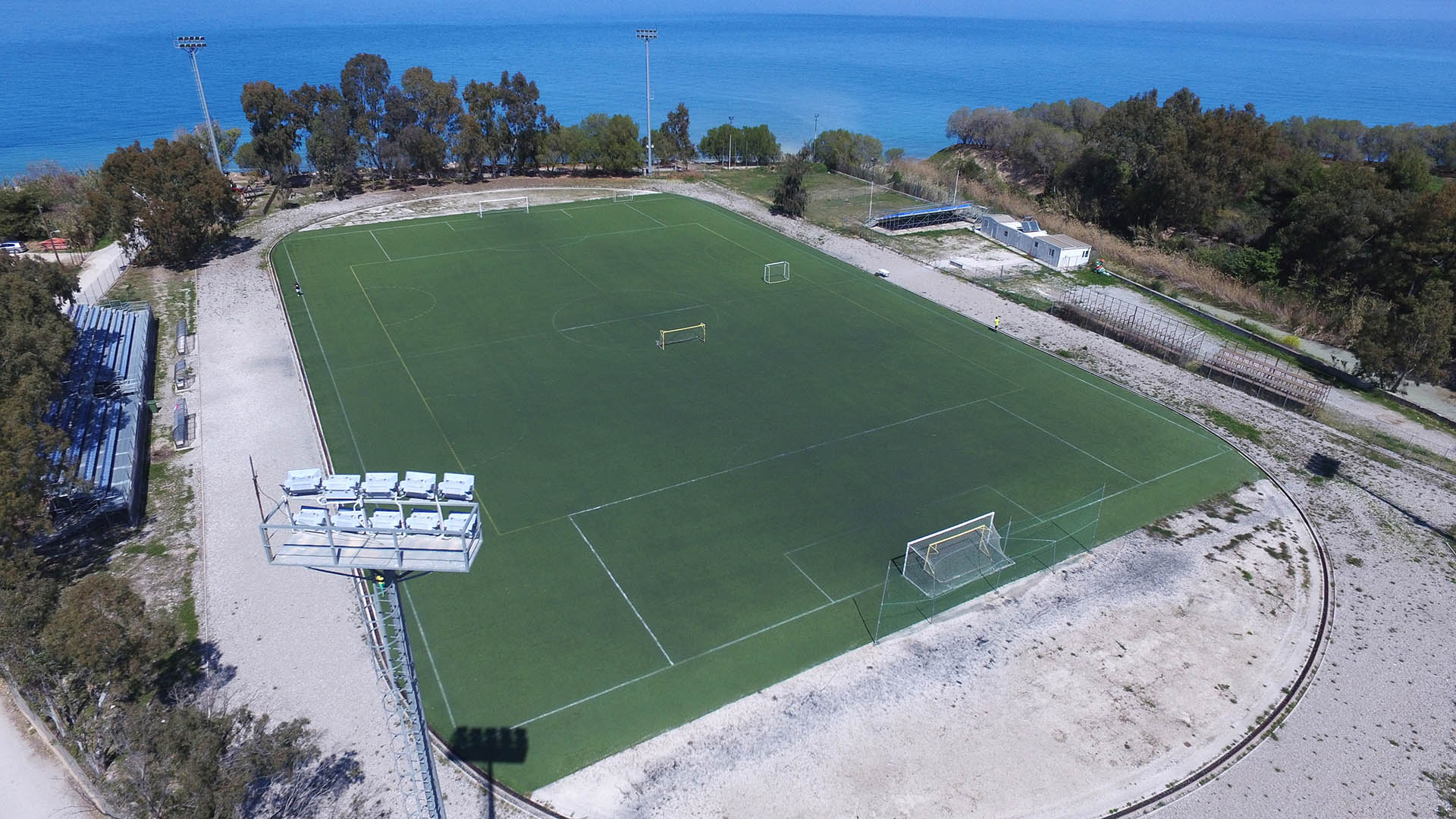
Municipal Stadium of Aigeira

Its major soccer team is A.O. Thyella Aigeiras. Since July 2018 the club merged with the local football team of the neighbour town of Akrata forming a new club under the name A.E. Aigeiras/Akratas. Aigeira is also home to non-league amateur football club Panaigeiratikos.

== Transport ==
The Greek National Road 8A (E65 Corinth - Patras) and the Corinth-Patras railway run through the town.

== See also ==
- List of settlements in Achaea

== Gallery ==
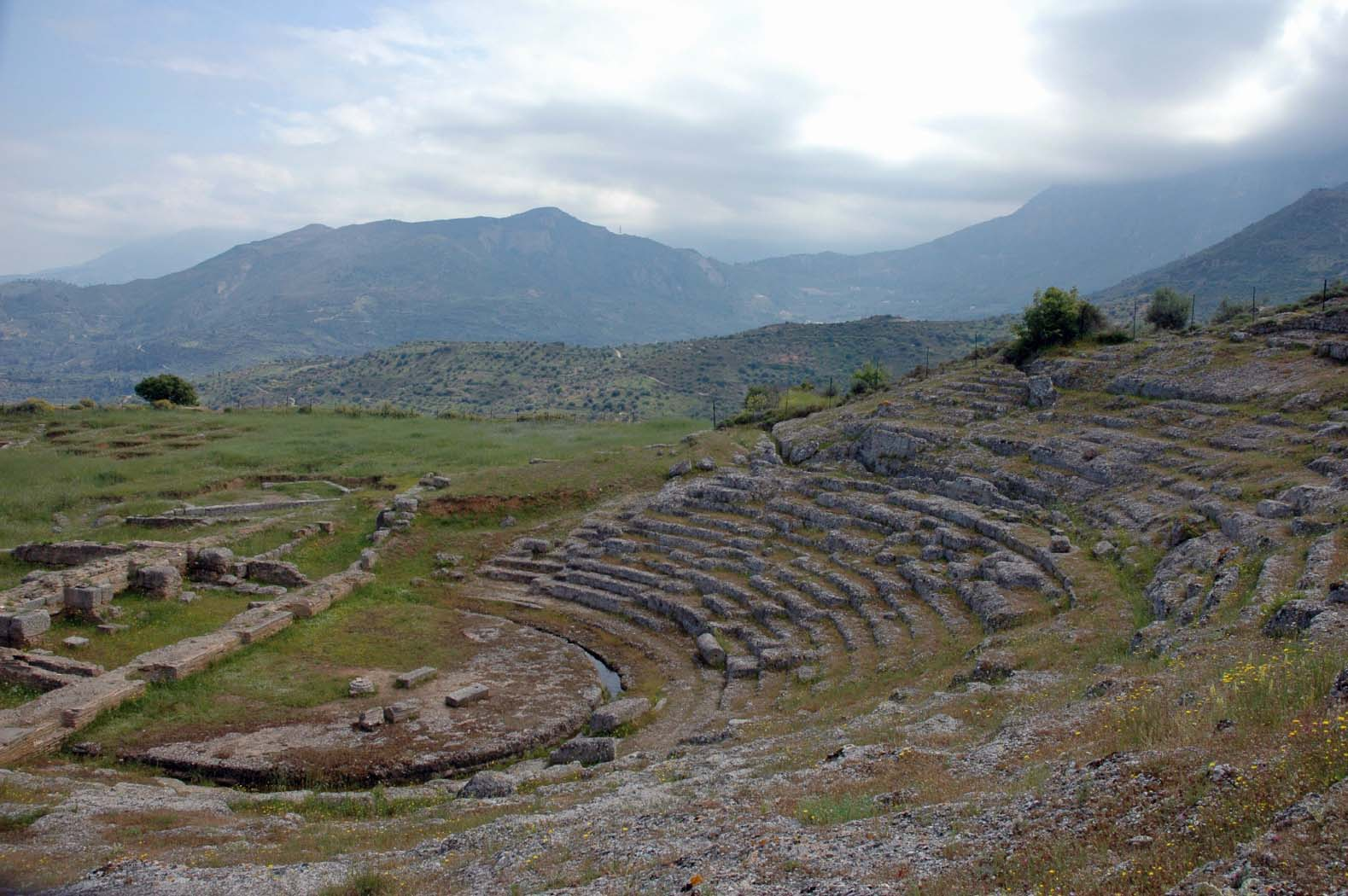
Theatre in Aigeira

== Bibliography ==
- Alram-Stern, Eva (2019). "Aigeira and the Corinthian Gulf at the Transition from the Neolithic Period to the Early Bronze Age". In Doumas, C.G.; Giannikouri, A.; Kouka, O. (eds.). The Aegean Early Bronze Age: New evidence. International Conference, Athens. April 11th–14th. Ministry of Culture, Archaeological Institute of Aegean Studies. Ministry of Culture and Sports (Greece).
- Alram-Stern, Eva (2010). "Aigeira and the Beginning of the Middle Helladic Period in Achaia". In Philippa-Touchais, Anne; Touchais, Gilles; Voutsaki, Sofia; Wright, James (eds.). Mesohelladica: La Grèce continentale au Bronze Moyen. French School at Athens. pp. 143–194.
- Arena, Emiliano (2015). "Mycenaean Peripheries during the Palatial Age: The Case of Achaia". Hesperia. 84 (1): 1–46. doi:10.2972/hesperia.84.1.0001. S2CID 164407730.
- Austrian Academy of Sciences (2021a). "Aigeira". Austrian Archaeological Institute.
- Austrian Academy of Sciences (2021b). "Aigeira/Achaia: From Late Mycenaean Settlement to Archaic Sanctuary". Austrian Archaeological Institute.
- Austrian Academy of Sciences (2021c). "Aigeira: Urbanistics". Austrian Archaeological Institute.
- Bintliff, John (1977). "The History of Archaeo-Geographic Studies of Prehistoric Greece, and Recent Fieldwork". In Bintliff, John (ed.). Mycenaean Geography: Proceedings of the Cambridge Colloquium, September 1976. Cambridge: Oxford University Press. pp. 3–16.
- Blackman, David (2008). "Sea Transport, Part 2: Harbors". In Oleson, John Peter (ed.). The Oxford Handbook of Engineering and Technology in the Classical World. Oxford: Oxford University Press. pp. 638–772.
- Blackman, David (1997). "Archaeology in Greece 1996–1997". Archaeological Reports. 43: 1–125. doi:10.1017/S0570608400006839. S2CID 131081267.
- Blackman, David; Baker, Julian; Hardwick, Nicholas (1998). "Archaeology in Greece 1997–1998". Archaeological Reports. 44: 1–136. doi:10.1017/S0570608400002453. JSTOR 581117. S2CID 129632831.
- Deger-Jalkotzy, Sigrid; Alram, Eva (2020). Aigeira 2. Die mykenische Akropolis. Grabungen 1975–1980. Stratigraphie und Bebauung.
- Deger-Jalkotzy, Sigrid (2003). "Stratified Pottery Deposits from the Late Helladic III C Settlement at Aigeira/Achaia". In Deger-Jalkotzy, Sigrid; Zavadil, Michaela (eds.). LH III C Chronology and Synchronisms. Proceedings of the international workshop held at the Austrian Academy of Sciences at Vienna, May 7th and 8th, 2001, Österreichische Akademie der Wissenschaften philosophisch-historische Klasse Denkschriften 310 (Vienna 2003). Österreichische Akademie der Wissenschaften. pp. 53–75.
- Deger-Jalkotzy, Sigrid (2008). "15. Decline, Destruction, Aftermath". In Shelmerdine, Cynthia (ed.). The Cambridge Companion to the Aegean Bronze Age. Cambridge: Cambridge University Press. pp. 387–415.
- Gauss, Walter, ed. (2022). Forschungen im Bereich des Theaters von Aigeira 2011 bis 2018 : Aigeira 3. Vienna: Österreichische Akademie der Wissenschaften. ISBN 9783700184614.
- Gauss, Walter (2019). "Mycenaean Aigeira: A Summary of Excavations and Research 2011-2016". In Greco, Emanuele; Rizakis, Athanasios (eds.). Annuario della scuola archeologica di atene e delle missioni italiane in oriente: Supplemento 3: Gli achei in grecia e in magna grecia: nuove scoperte e nuove prospettive. Scuola Archeologica Italiana di Atene. pp. 57–66. ISBN 978-960-9559-18-8.
- Gauss, Walter (2018). "New evidence for the beginning of habitation at Aigeira, Achaia (Greece)". In Dietz, Soren; Mavridis, Fanis; Tankosić, Žarko; Takaoğlu, Turan (eds.). Communities in Transition: The Circum-Aegean Area During the 5th and 4th Millennia BC. Oxbow Books. pp. 323–330.
- Ladstätter, Georg (2004). "Aigeira — Greece". OEAI: Projects Abroad. Archived from the original on 2004-06-25.
- Mackil, Emily (2014). "Wandering Cities: Alternatives to Catastrophe in the Greek Polis". American Journal of Archaeology. 108 (1): 493–516. doi:10.3764/aja.108.4.493. S2CID 147238008.
- Papageorgiou, Sophia; Arnold, Maurice; Laborel, Jacques; Stiros, Stathis (1993). "Seismic uplift of the harbour of ancient Aigeira, Central Greece". The International Journal of Nautical Archaeology. 22 (3): 275–281. Bibcode:1993IJNAr..22..275P. doi:10.1111/j.1095-9270.1993.tb00420.x.
- Prantl, Maria (2011). "Diocletian's Edict on Maximum Prices of 301 AD: A fragment found in Aigeira". Historia.scribere. 3: 359–398.
- Shelmerdine, Cynthia (2008). "Introduction: Background, Methods and Sources". In Shelmerdine, Cynthia (ed.). The Cambridge Companion to the Aegean Bronze Age. Cambridge: Cambridge University Press. pp. 1–18.
- Sherratt, Susan (1980). "Regional Variation in the Pottery of Late Helladic IIIB". The Annual of the British School at Athens. 75: 175–202. doi:10.1017/S0068245400006390. S2CID 129045611.
- Stiros, Stathis (1998). "Archaeological evidence for unusually rapid holocene uplift rates in an active normal faulting terrain: Roman Harbor of Aigeira, Gulf of Corinth, Greece". Geoarchaeology. 13 (7): 731–741. Bibcode:1998Gearc..13..731S. doi:10.1002/(SICI)1520-6548(199810)13:7<731::AID-GEA4>3.0.CO;2-7.
