= Panagiotis Meltemis =

Greek poet and writer

Panagiotis Meltemis (Greek: Παναγιώτης Μελτέμης, born Panagiotis K. Papadopoulos (Παναγιώτη Κ. Παπαδόπουλου) 1918-1978) was a Greek poet and writer from Messinia.

== Biography ==
Meltemis was born in Kopanaki in 1918. He participated at Aetos Middle School, Meligala and Kyparissia Middle Schools. He studied law at the University of Athens and crossroaded as a councillor at the employment office. He took part with the Greek Resistance.

In Greek letters, he appeared before World War II, he drew and wrote poetry in some newspapers including Tharros of Kalamata and Makedonia of Thessaloniki (then also Salonica). He took part in the publishing house as a translator. His work pointed out with literary organizations including I Militsa (Η Μηλίτσα) which awarded himself ifor Ergatiki Estias (Εργατικής Εστίας = Work Place) (1948) in his poetic direction of the periodical Eklogi (Εκλογή) with the mind of translating a sonnet by Philippe Desportes, Icare chut ici, the translation made it into second place in 1949. He wrote poems, works, novels and translated plays and theatrical works from French, Italian and English. His first book I Militsa and Other Works (Η Μηλίτσα και άλλα διηγήματα = I Miltsa ke ala diyimata) which received in 1950. He took part in a poetic council Ta Horiatika [Τα Χωριάτικα] (1957) and the novel Erima Simadia [Έρημα Σημάδια] (1963).

He also wrote in other papers and periodical even O Logotehnis as well as papers including Mesiniaki Anagenissi and Icho of Messinia, in these brought only humorous writing with titles especially I kouvedes tou Mitsiotassi (Οι κουβέντες του Μητσιοτάση) and Jianabetika (Τζιαναμπέτικα) along with other writings.

He died in 1978.

== Works ==
- Poems: Ta horiatika (1957)
- Story: I Militrsa kai alla diyimata (1950)
- Novel: Erima simadia (1963)

== Sources ==
- Ekloyi periodical, 11, Vol V, Nov. 1949, p 1216-1217
- T. Sinadinos To Vima 8/8/1950
- S. Marados, Proodeftikos Fileleftheros, 1/9/1951
- G. Anapliotis, Simea Kalamon
  - 2/4/1953
  - 5/23/1957
- G. Apostolopoulos To Vima, 5/22/1957
- G. Politarchis Logotechniko Deltio (Literary News) July 1957
- M. Meraklis, Iho tis Messinias, 5/16/1957
- N. Karabelas, Messiniako Biographical Dictionary, 1962, Kalamata
- Trifyliaki Estia periodical, 25, Jan-Feb 1979, p 34-46
- Erefna periodical, 84, Spring 1998, p 122-124
- Trgyliaki Estia periodical, 101, Jan-Mar, 1998
- D. Pittaras, Mesinii Dimiourgi, 1999 p 223-226
- K. Stamatis, Messinia Literature (Η Λογοτεχνία της Μεσσηνίας = I Logotehnia tis Mesinias), Athens, 2000, p 222-225
- Tharros Kalamata, 2/16/2008
- I. Hadjivassiliou, Maties sto piitiko ergo tou Panagioti Meltemi (Ματιές στο ποιητικό έργο του Παναγιώτη Μελτέμη = Eyes on the Poetic Works of Panayiotis Meltemis) Messiniako Imerologio, Vol II, 2008, p 439-495
- K. H. Konstantidis, I piitis ke pezografos Panagiotis Meltemis (Ο ποιητής και πεζογράφος Παναγιώτης Μελτέμης = Poet and Writer Panayiogis Meltemis), Messiniako Imerologio, Vol II, 2008, p 496-500
- P. Bikos, I diigimatografia touy Panagiotis Meltemis (Η διηγηματογραφία του Παναγιώτη Μελτέμη = The Short Stories of Panayiotis Meltemis), Messiniako Imerologio, Vol II, 2008, p 501-504
- K. Zotopoulos, Isagogi sto erto tou P Meltemis (Εισαγωγή στο έργο του Π. Μελτέμη = Introduction to the Works of P. Meltemis), Messiniako Imerologio, Vol II, 2008, p 491-492
- D. Kyriazis To mithistorima Erima Simadia Mia kefati pikrografia tou Panagioti Meltemi (Το μυθιστόρημα ‘Έρημα Σημάδια’: Μια ‘κεφάτη πικρογραφία’ του Παναγιώτη Μελτέμη), Foni, 2/25/2008
- Thanassia Liakopoulos, O erotas sta hrona toa fimatiossis: Militsa kai alla diyimata tou Panayiotis Meltemis, (Ο έρωτας στα χρόνια της φυματίωσης: 'Μηλίτσα και άλλα διηγήματα' του Παναγιώτη Μελτέμη) Ithomi, no 57/58, Dec, 2008, p 100-101
