= Aigeira Municipal Stadium =

Sports venue in Aigeira, Greece

Aigeira Municipal Stadium Δημοτικό Στάδιο Αιγείρας
- Interactive map of Aigeira Municipal Stadium; Δημοτικό Στάδιο Αιγείρας
- Location: Aigeira, Greece
- Coordinates: 38.149553876720596°N 22.362661887767583°E

The Aigeira Municipal Stadium (Greek: Δημοτικό Στάδιο Αιγείρας), is a sport venue in Aigeira, Greece, the home ground of the local team Thiella Aigeiras which recently merged with the football club of PAO Akrata, forming A.E. Aigeiras/Akratas.
