= Gulf of Corinth =

Inlet between mainland Greece and the Peloponnese

- Κορινθιακός Κόλπος (Greek)
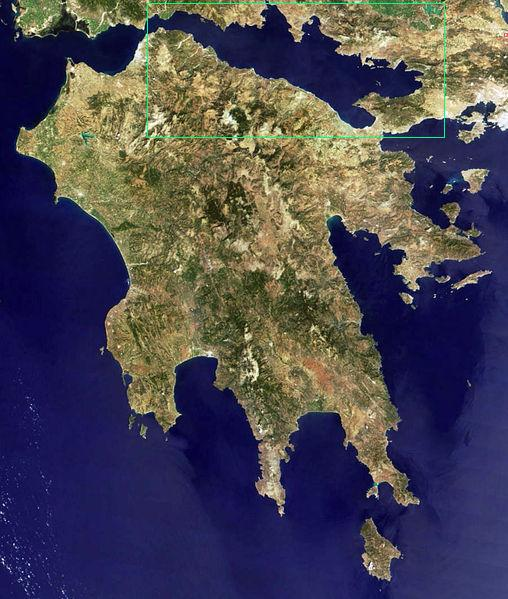
- Gulf of Corinth within the green box north of Peloponnese

- Location within Greece Location within Mediterranean Location within Europe
- Coordinates: 38°12′N 22°30′E
- Type: gulf
- Part of: Ionian Sea (Mediterranean)
- Basin countries: Greece
- Max. length: 130 km (81 mi)
- Max. width: 32 km (20 mi)
- Min. width: 8.4 km (5.2 mi)
- Surface area: 2,400 km^{2} (930 sq mi)
- Max. depth: 935 m (3,068 ft)

The Gulf of Corinth or the Corinthian Gulf (Greek: Κορινθιακός Κόλπος, romanized: Korinthiakós Kólpos, Greek pronunciation: [koɾinθiaˈkos ˈkolpos]) is an inlet of the Ionian Sea, separating the Peloponnese from western mainland Greece. It is bounded in the east by the Isthmus of Corinth which includes the shipping-designed Corinth Canal and in the west by the Rion Strait which widens into the shorter Gulf of Patras (part of the Ionian Sea) and whose narrowest point has been crossed since 2004 by the Rio–Antirrio Bridge. The gulf is bordered by the large administrative divisions (regional units): Aetolia-Acarnania and Phocis in the north, Boeotia in the northeast, Attica in the east, Corinthia in the southeast and south and Achaea in the southwest. The tectonic movement across the gulf is comparable to parts of Iceland and Turkey, growing by 10 mm (0.39 in) per year.

In the Middle Ages, the gulf was known as the Gulf of Lepanto (the Italian form of Naupactus).

Shipping routes between the Greek commercial port Piraeus (further away from ultimate destinations but larger and better connected to the south than the north-western Greek port of Igoumenitsa) to western Mediterranean and hemisphere ports pass along this gulf. A ferry crosses the gulf to link Aigio and Agios Nikolaos, towards the western end of the gulf.

== Geology ==
The gulf was created by the expansion of a tectonic rift due to the westward movement of the Anatolian Plate, and is expanding by 10 mm (0.39 in) per year. The surrounding faults can produce earthquakes up to magnitude around 6.5, though they are relatively uncommon. On June 15, 1995, an earthquake of magnitude 6.2 occurred near the city of Aigion. Much of the northern margin of the gulf has gentle gradients (between 10 and 20 degrees). The southern margin of the gulf has largely steep gradients (between 30 and 40 degrees).

== Nature ==
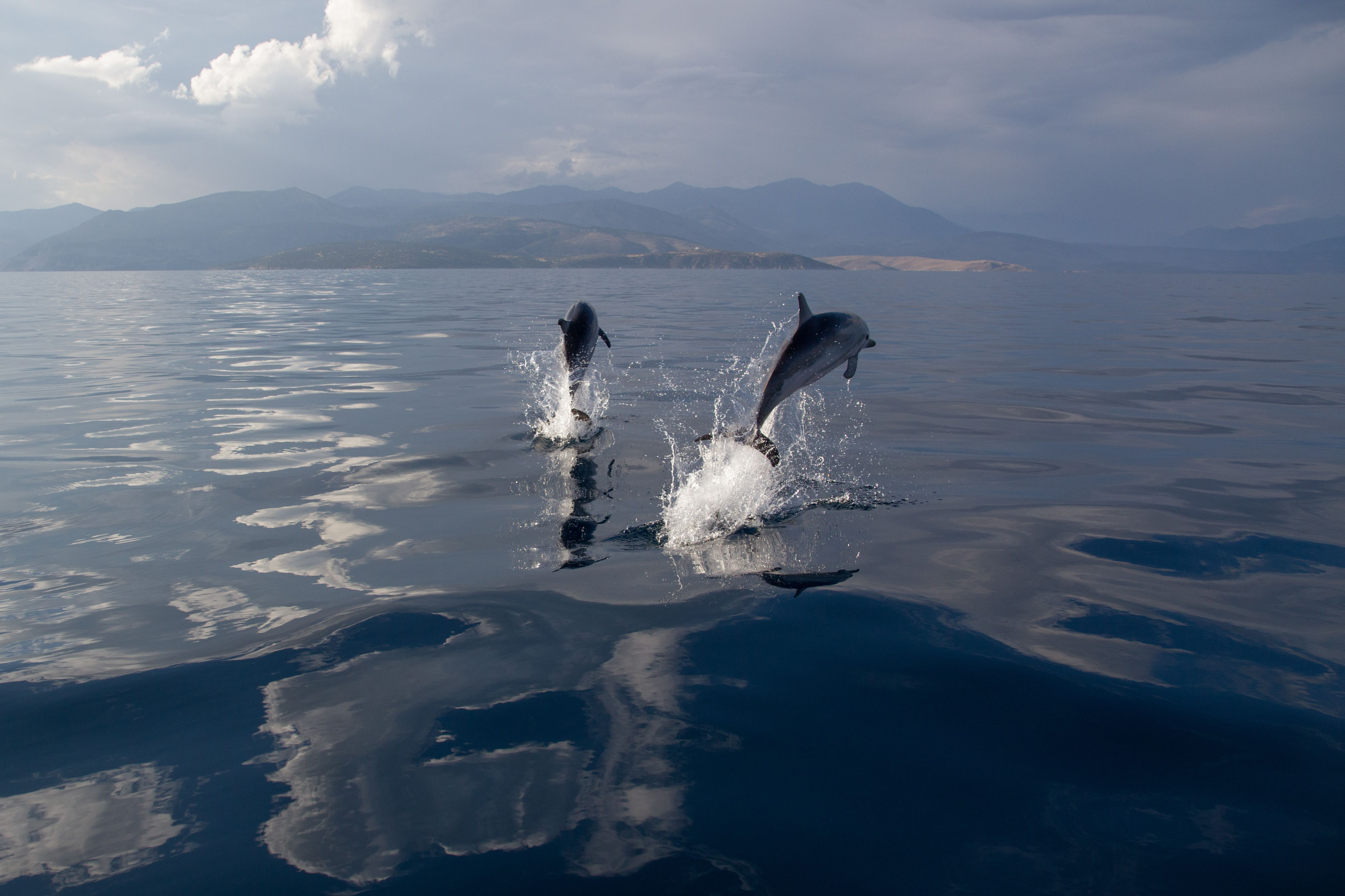
Striped dolphins jumping in the gulf

Cetaceans such as fin whales and dolphins are known to enter the Gulf occasionally.

== Gulfs and bays ==
- Alkyonides Gulf, east
- Crissaean Gulf (Gulf of Crissa), north
- Bay of Antikyra, north
- Dombraina (Domvrena), north
- Rion Strait, links the Gulf to the Ionian Sea

== Islands ==
- Trizonia (the only inhabited island), Alcyonides Islands (group of islets), Ampelos (islet), Fonias (islet), Prasoudi (islet)

== Bridges ==
- Rio–Antirrio bridge

== Cities and towns ==
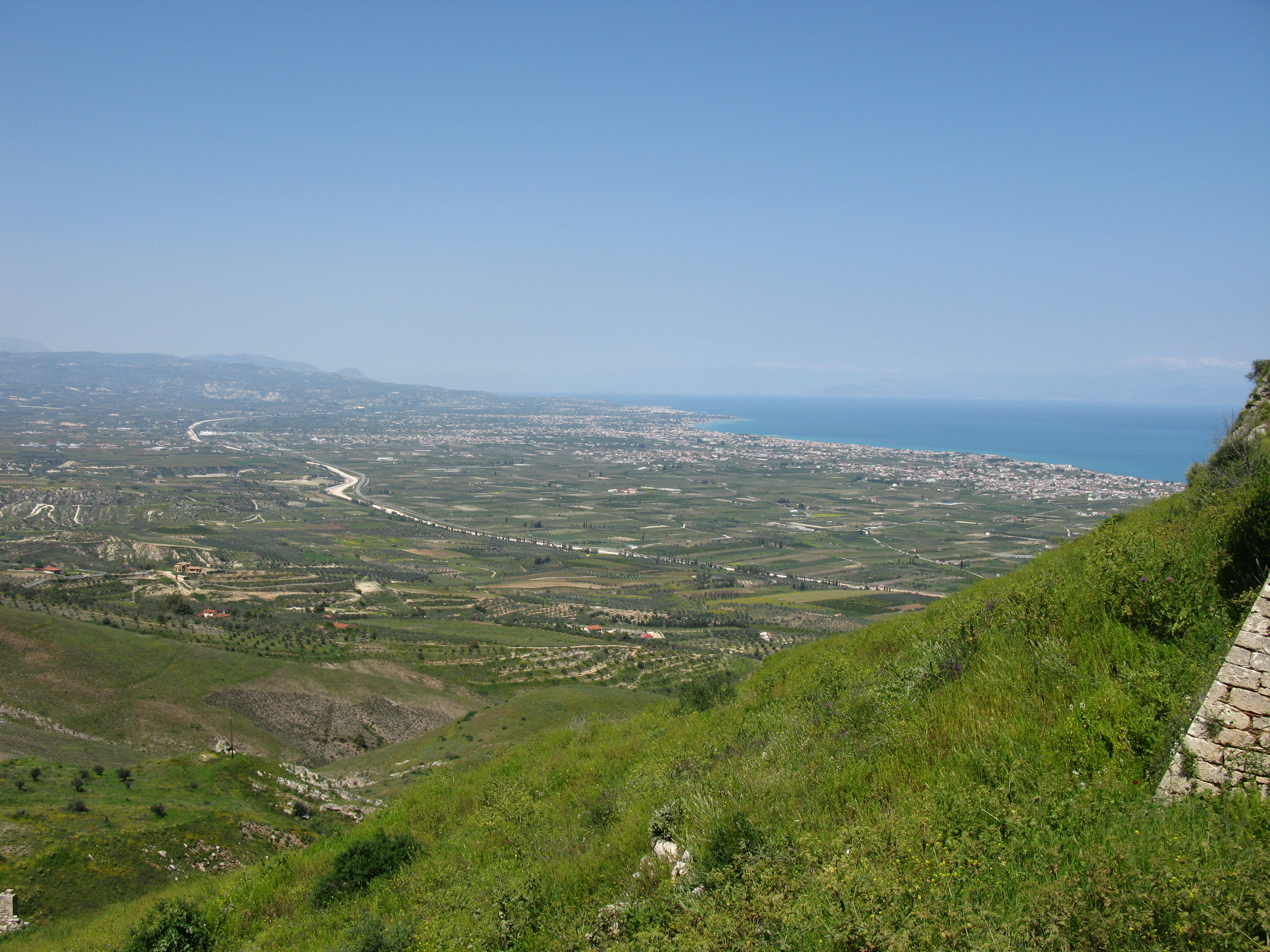
Gulf of Corinth from Acrocorinth

The main cities and towns that lie next to the gulf are, from the northwest clockwise, and grouped by regional unit:

- Aetolia-Acarnania: Antirrio, Nafpaktos
- Phocis: Galaxidi, Itea, Kirra
- Boeotia: Antikyra, Paralia Distomou
- West Attica
- Corinthia: Loutraki, Corinth, Assos, Vrachati, Velo, Kiato, Kato Diminio, Xylokastro
- Achaea: Aigeira, Diakopto, Aigio, Rododafni, Agios Vasileios, Aktaio

== Tributaries ==
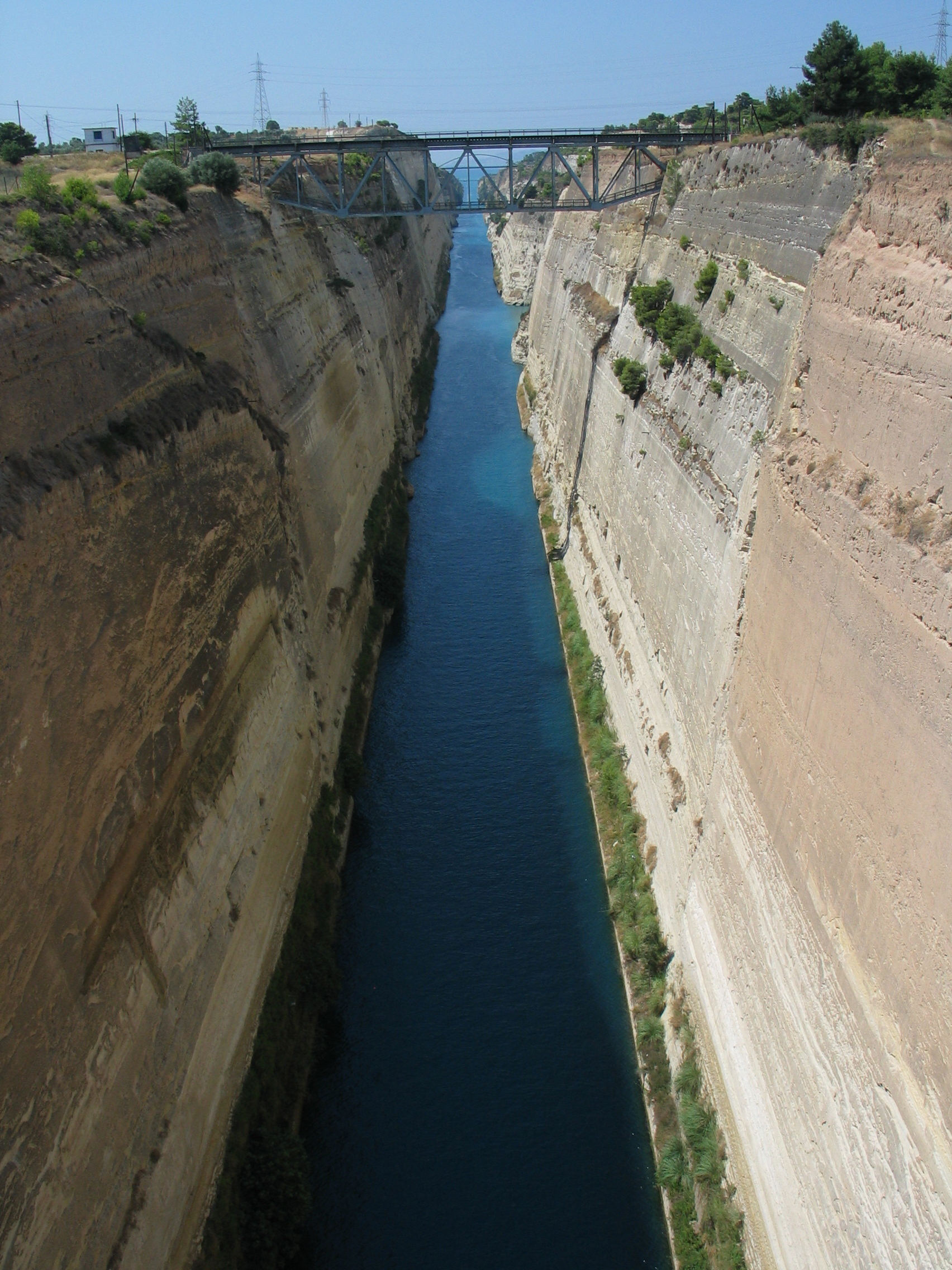
Corinth Canal

Tributaries are listed west to east:

=== Northern ===
- Mornos
- Pleistos

=== Southern ===
- Selemnos
- Volinaios
- Foinikas
- Selinountas
- Vouraikos
- Krathis
- Krios
- Zacholitikos
- Fonissa
- Sythas
- Elissonas
- Asopos
