= Krios (stream) =

- Native name: Κριός (Greek)

Location
- Country: Greece

Physical characteristics
- Mouth
  - location: Gulf of Corinth
  - coordinates: 38.1504°N 22.3635°E
- Length: 20.3 km (12.6 mi)

The Krios (Greek: Κριός, Latin: Crius) is a stream (little river) in the municipal unit of Aigeira, in Achaea, southern Greece. It is 20.3 km (12.6 mi) long. Its source is on Mount Chelmos, near the village of Perithori. It flows near the ancient city of Felloi and the villages of Sinevro, Oasi and the Mycenaean acropolis of ancient Aigeira. The stream empties into the Gulf of Corinth near Aigeira.
