= Kosynthos (river) =

Kosynthos (Κόσυνθος)
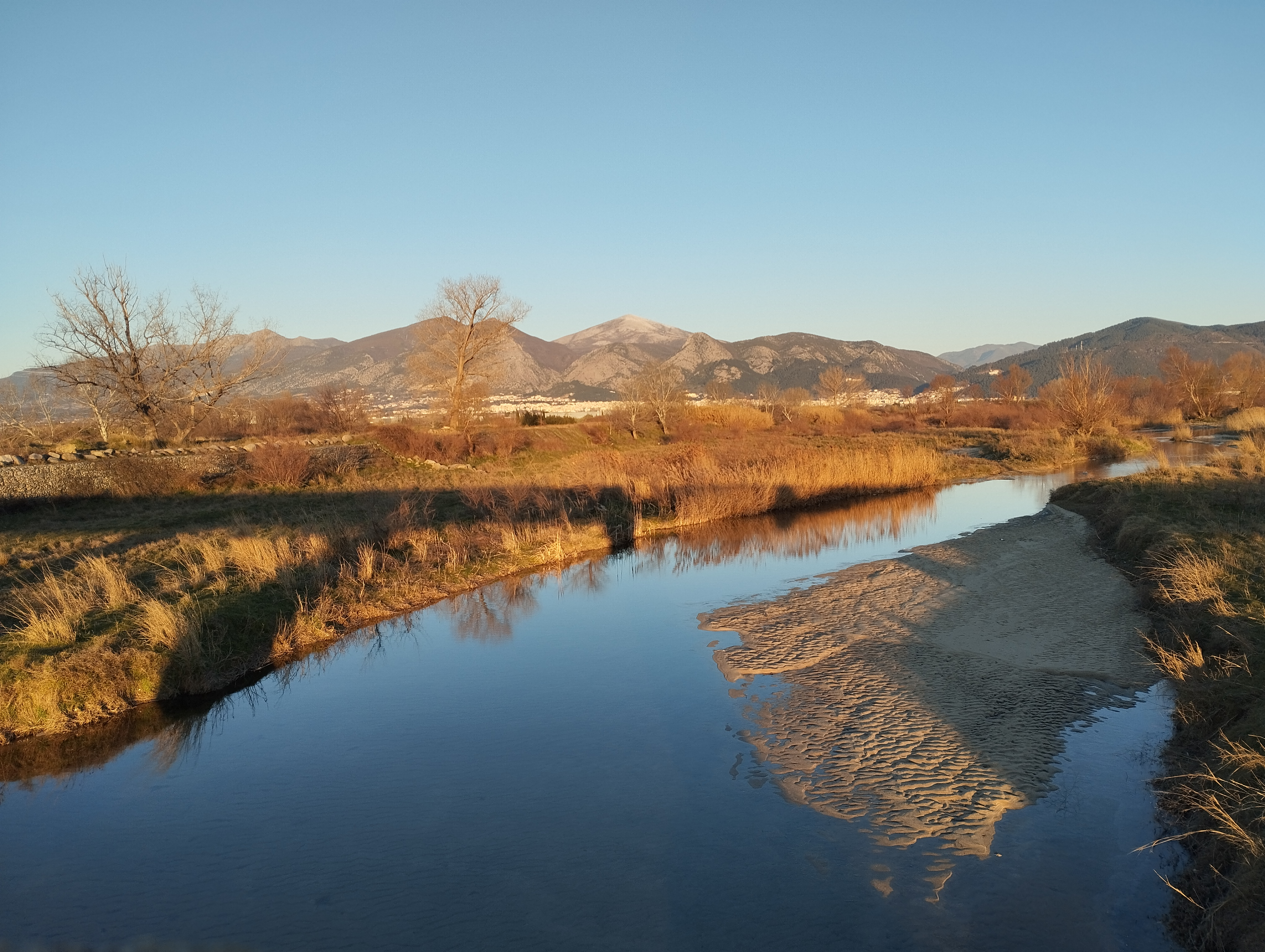
- Kosynthos near the village of Pigadia (Xanthi is visible in the background)

Location
- Countries: Greece

Physical characteristics
- Source
  - location: Rhodope Mountains
- Mouth
  - location: Aegean Sea through Lake Vistonida
  - coordinates: 41°7′37.4″N 24°55′27.0″E
- Length: 52 km (32 mi)

Kosynthos (Greek: Κόσυνθος) is a river in Thrace, Greece, with a total length of 52 kilometres. It originates from Mount Erymanthos (also known as Chaintou) of the Rhodope Mountains. The river flows generally south to southeast, traverses the city of Xanthi, and eventually empties into Lake Vistonida near the settlement of Selino, at the site of the ancient city of Anastasioupolis.

During ancient times, Kosynthos along with other rivers that flow from the Rhodope Mountains to the coastal area (such as Nestos and Kompsatos), shaped not only the physical but also the cultural landscape as ethnic, tribal or cultural boundaries in Aegean Thrace. This was an area of significant importance as the meeting point of the Aegean world of the Greek city states with the inland cultures of various Thracian tribes like the Sapaians, Vistones or Kikones who inhabited the area.
