= Zacholitikos =

- Native name: Ζαχολήτικος (Greek)

Location
- Country: Greece

Physical characteristics
- Mouth
  - location: Gulf of Corinth
  - coordinates: 38.1364°N 22.4278°E

The Zacholitikos (Greek: Ζαχολήτικος, also Δερβένιος - Dervenios) is a small river in the western part of Corinthia, Greece. The source of the river is in the mountains near Evrostina. It empties into the Gulf of Corinth east of Derveni.
