= Otto Walter (archaeologist) =

Austrian archaeologist

Otto Walter (1882, in Vienna – 1965, in Parsch in the state of Salzburg) was an Austrian archaeologist.

From 1908 until 1938 he worked at the Austrian Archaeological Institute at Athens. After the Anschluss he worked at the German Archaeological Institute at Athens. He became a professor in 1945 at the University of Vienna. He was a professor in Salzburg in 1948 and again at Vienna from 1951 to 1953 with Josef Keil, director of the Österreichischen Archäologischen Institutes, lit. the Austrian Archaeological institutes.
