= Austrian Archaeological Institute at Athens =

Archaeological institute operating in Athens, Greece

Coordinates: 37°59′27″N 23°44′06″E

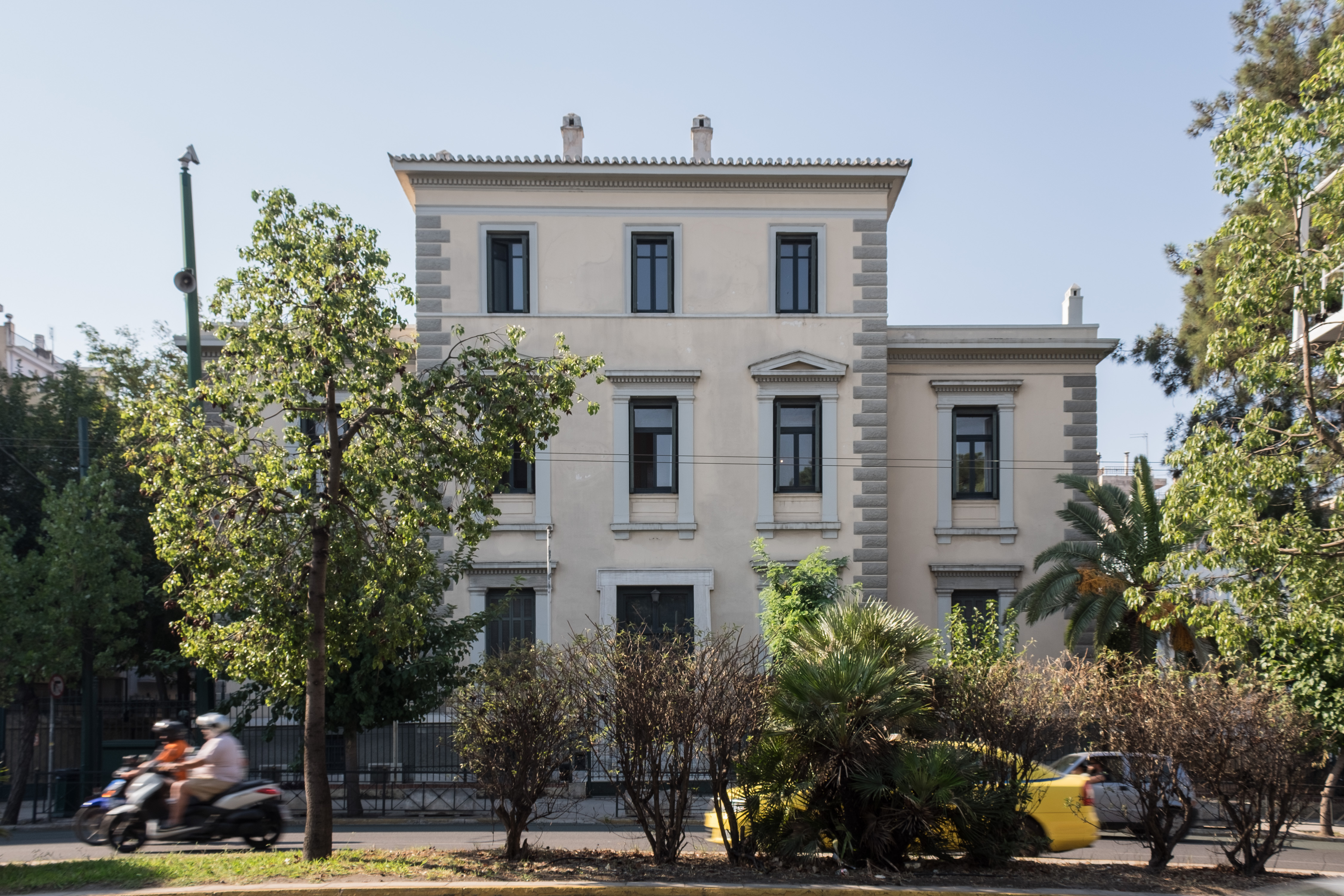
The building where the Austrian Archaeological Institute is housed in Athens.

The Austrian Archaeological Institute at Athens (German: Österreichisches Archäologisches Institut (ÖAI) Athen; Greek: Αυστριακό Αρχαιολογικό Ινστιτούτο Αθηνών) is one of the 19 foreign archaeological institutes operating in Athens, Greece. It is a branch of the Austrian Archaeological Institute at the Austrian Academy of Sciences in Vienna.

Founded in 1898 by Otto Benndorf, it is the fifth oldest such institution in Greece. Its main role is to provide a basis for Austrian scholars active in Greece, and to facilitate Austrian-run archaeological projects in the country.

== Excavations ==
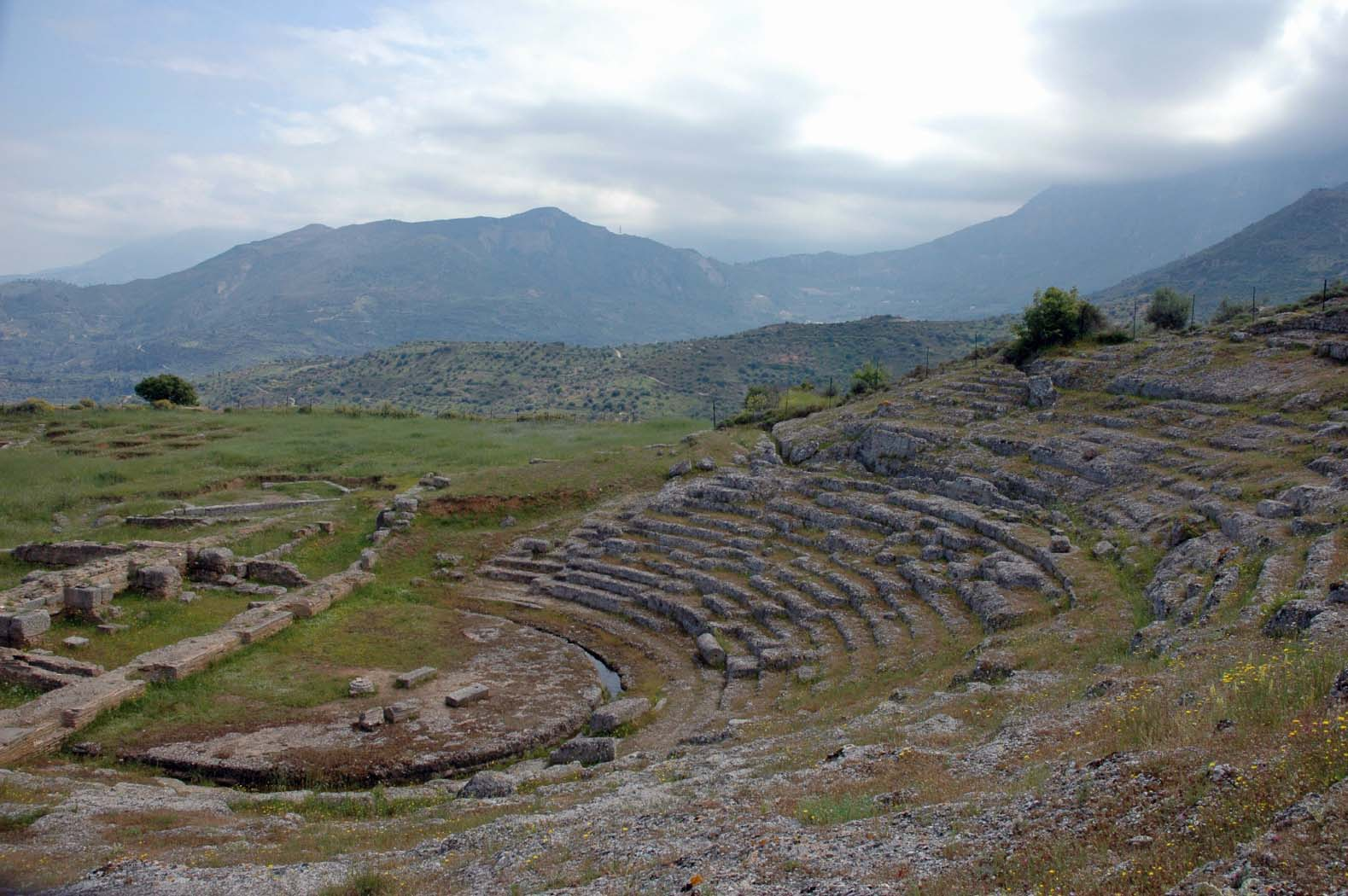
The theatre of Aigeira, excavated by the ÖAI in the 1970s.

During its long existence, the ÖAI Athen has been involved in excavations at Lousoi, Aigeira and Gremoulias (all in the modern province Achaia), at the site of Elis and in Kolonna (Aegina).

== Bibliography ==
- E. Korka, M. Xanthopoulou, E. Konstantinidi-Syvridi (editors), Foreign Archaeological Schools in Greece, 160 Years (Athens: Hellenic Ministry of Culture), 2006, p. 38-47.
