= Efpalinos Tunnel =

Road tunnel in Greece

- Interactive map of Efpalinos Tunnel

Overview
- Location: West Attica, Greece
- Coordinates: 37°58′39.8″N 23°17′04.0″E
- Status: Operational

Operation
- Work began: 1999
- Opened: July 2004
- Operator: Olympia Odos S.A.
- Traffic: automotive
- Character: Single-tube motorway tunnel

Technical
- Length: 1,700 m (5,600 ft)
- No. of lanes: 3

The Efpalinos Tunnel (Greek: Σήραγγα Ευπάλινος) is a tunnel on the Athens-Corinth section of the A8 motorway. Works began in 1999 as part of the construction of the Kakia Skala pass, one of the most dangerous road parts in Greece, with motorway standards. It was one of the first tunnels of the A8, and it was the longest tunnel of it until the Panagopoula Tunnel became operational in 2017. It was opened to traffic in July 2004, along with the rest of the motorway segment in time for the Athens Olympics.
