= A8 motorway (Greece) =

Motorway in Greece

A8 motorway
- Αυτοκινητόδρομος Α8
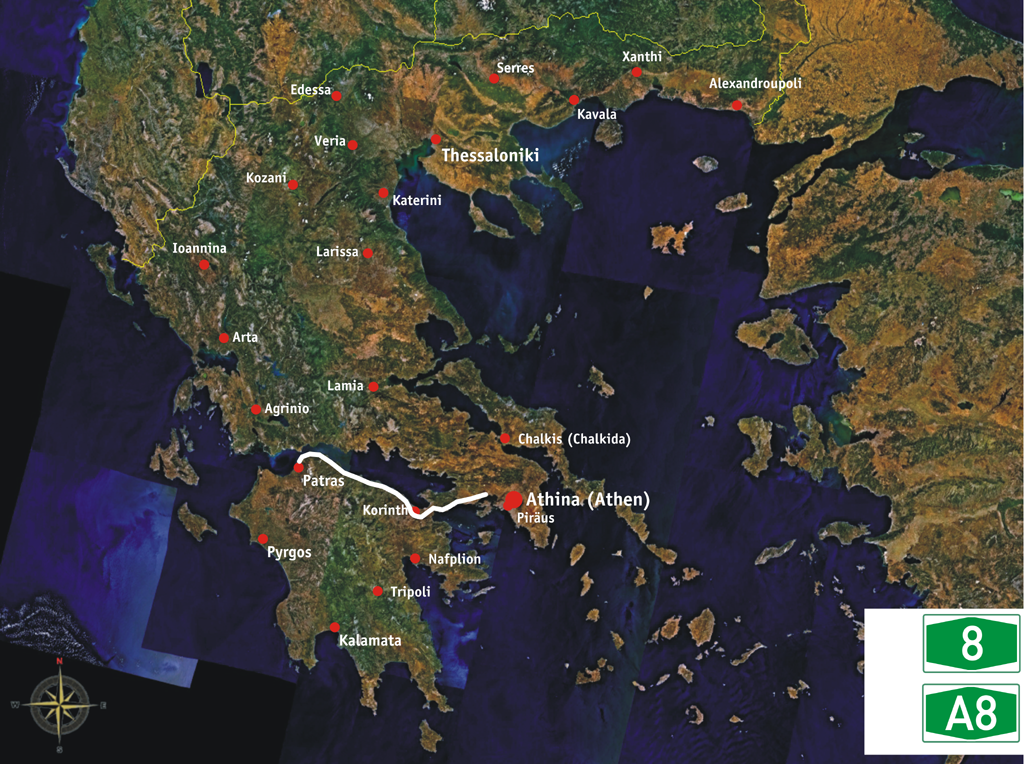

Route information
- Part of E65 (Corinth–Rio) and E94 (Elefsina–Corinth)
- Length: 290 km (180 mi)
- History: 1962–1973: Constructed as the EO8a; 2008: Elefsina–Corinth section assigned as the A8; 2008–2017: Corinth–Rio section upgraded to A8

Major junctions
- East end: Elefsina
- West end: Rio (A5)

Location
- Country: Greece
- Regions: Attica; Peloponnese; Western Greece
- Primary destinations: Elefsina; Corinth; Rio

Highway system
- Highways in Greece; Motorways; National roads
← A71	→ A90

The A8 motorway, also known as the Olympia Odos (Greek: Ολυμπία Οδός), is a toll motorway in southwestern Greece, which connects Athens with Pyrgos and Patras via Corinth, spanning a total of 290 km (180 mi).

The motorway replaces Greek National Road 8A, which has been upgraded to modern motorway standards. The completion date was scheduled for 2014. Since April 2017, the entire motorway from Eleusis to Patras is fully operational. The extension to Pyrgos opened in 2025. The future extension to Tsakona near Kalamata is in the planning stages.

== Operation ==
Olympia Odos S.A. will maintain and operate the road for a total of 30 years. Operations will include two Traffic Control Centers built to operate 24/7 to handle emergency calls, as well as monitor traffic situations and contact emergency services when needed. Also, as part of the construction deal, 24/7 patrols, worksite protection, timely detection and response to incidents, and special services in the winter, are included.

During the construction phase, routine maintenance and work for all parts of the infrastructure of the existing National roads were conducted.

=== Facilities ===
As of 2023, there are 5 front, two-sided toll stations on the A8: at Eleusis, the Isthmus, Zevgolateio, Elaionas and Rio. The section between Eleusis and Corinth has 3 lanes per direction. There are service areas in Nea Peramos, Megara, Isthmus, Kiato, Akrata and Aigio.

=== Construction progress ===
On September 2, 2016, the first fully completed Olympia Odos segment, the section between Ancient Corinth and Kiato (20 km with 2 lanes in each direction + emergency lane and two interchanges in Zevgolatio and Kiato), was officially opened to traffic, with the presence of the Greek Prime Minister, Alexis Tsipras. Although there were still some minor scale works (mostly on interchanges), traffic flow was not impacted. On the same day, the Derveni tunnels were given to public use. On December 19, 2016, another 9 km opened in Olympia Odos from Kiato to Xylokastro, without the Xylokastro interchange which was opened in February together with Derveni Interchange.

Any remaining segments of the motorway under construction were completed and opened to traffic in April 2017 when the official inauguration of the road took place as well, at the same month that segments of the A5 motorway and the A1 motorway's Tempe tunnels were also inaugurated and opened to traffic.

In July 2025, the Patras to Pyrgos segment of the motorway was opened. Planning is under way for the extension to Ancient Olympia and south to Tsakona near Kalamata where the motorway will intersect with the A7 motorway.

== Tunnels ==
=== Westbound (direction Patras) ===
- Geraneia Tunnel (930 m or 3,050 ft)
- Efpalinos Tunnel (1,700 m or 5,600 ft)
- Aithra Tunnel (1,160 m or 3,810 ft)
- Panagopoula Tunnel (3,160 m or 10,370 ft)

=== Eastbound (direction Athens) ===
- Panagopoula Tunnel (4,000 m or 13,000 ft)
- Derveni Tunnel (480 m or 1,570 ft)
- Skyron Tunnel (360 m or 1,180 ft)
- Thiseas Tunnel (319 m or 1,047 ft)

== Exit list ==
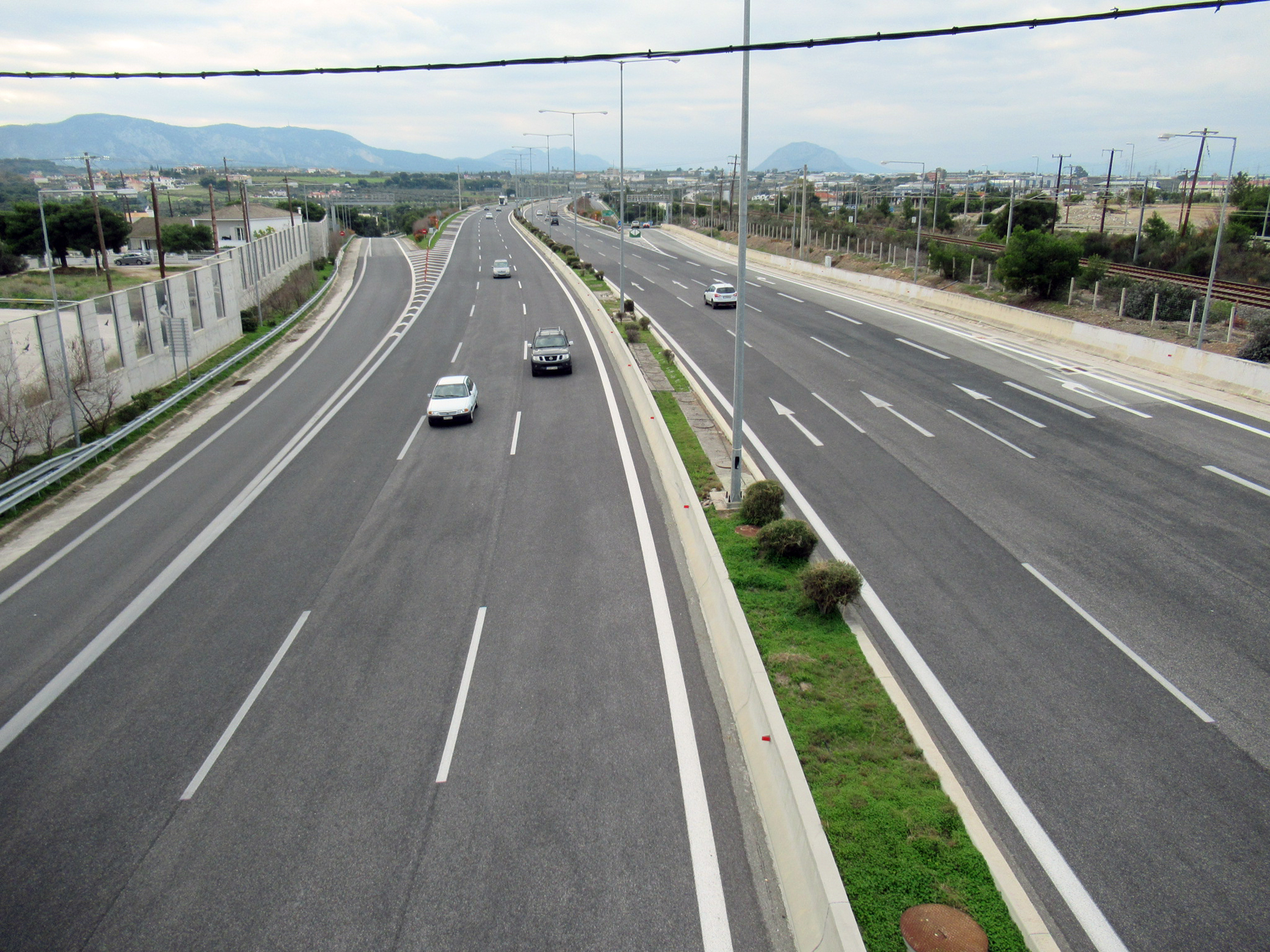
A8 near the Epidaurus exit

Notes
Under construction
Planned

Regional unit	Exit	Name	Destinations	Notes/Also as
West Attica	1	Eleusis	EO3	Eastern terminus of the motorway
West Attica	2	Attiki Odos interchange	A6 E94 to Athens International Airport (to Eleusis only)	
West Attica	2A	Nea Peramos toll post free	to Patras only	E94
West Attica	3	Nea Peramos		E94
West Attica	4	Megara		E94
West Attica	5	Pachi		E94
West Attica	6	Panorama		E94
West Attica	7	Kineta		E94
Corinthia	8	Agioi Theodoroi		E94
Corinthia	9	Loutraki	EO8	E94
Corinthia	10	Epidaurus	EO10	E94
Corinthia	11	Corinth center	EO8	E94
Corinthia	12	Moreas interchange	A7 E65 to Tripoli, Kalamata	E94
Corinthia	13	Ancient Corinth	EO7	E65
Corinthia	14	Zevgolateio		E65
Corinthia	15	Kiato		E65
Corinthia	16	Xylokastro		E65
Corinthia	17	Lykoporia		E65
Corinthia	18	Derveni		E65
Achaea	19	Akrata		E65
Achaea	20	Kalavryta		E65
Achaea	21	Aigio east	EO8	E65
Achaea	22	Aigio west	EO8	E65
Achaea	23	Selianitika	EO8	E65
Achaea	24	Drepano		E65
Achaea	25	Rio interchange	A5 E55 E65 to Ioannina	Western terminus of the motorway
