= Daphni Monastery =

Medieval monastery in Athens

Monastery of Daphni
UNESCO World Heritage Site
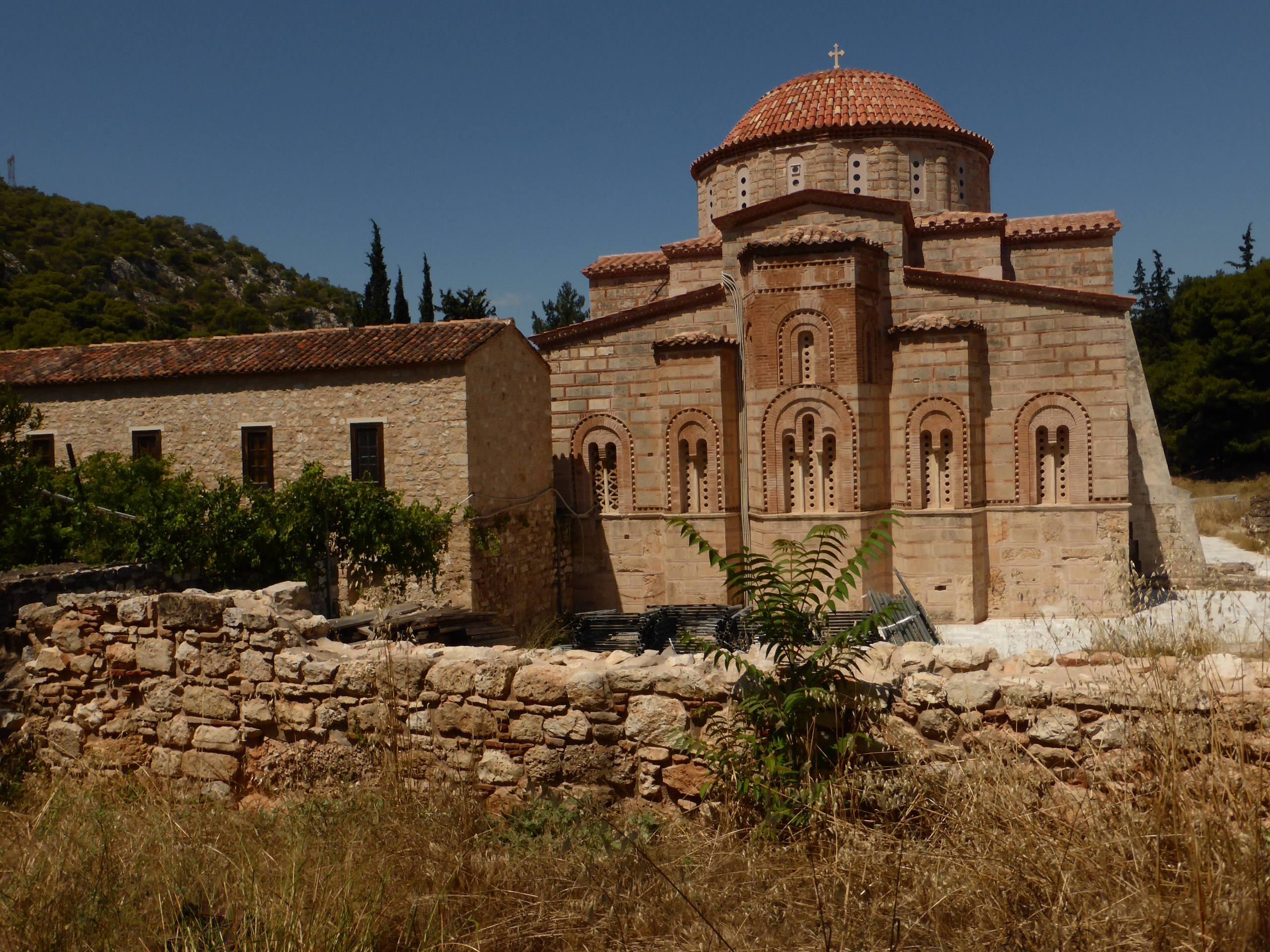

- Location within Greece
- Location: Greece
- Part of: Monasteries of Daphni, Hosios Loukas and Nea Moni of Chios
- Criteria: Cultural: i, iv
- Reference: 537-002
- Inscription: 1990 (14th Session)
- Area: 0.94 ha (2.3 acres)
- Coordinates: 38°00′47″N 23°38′09″E

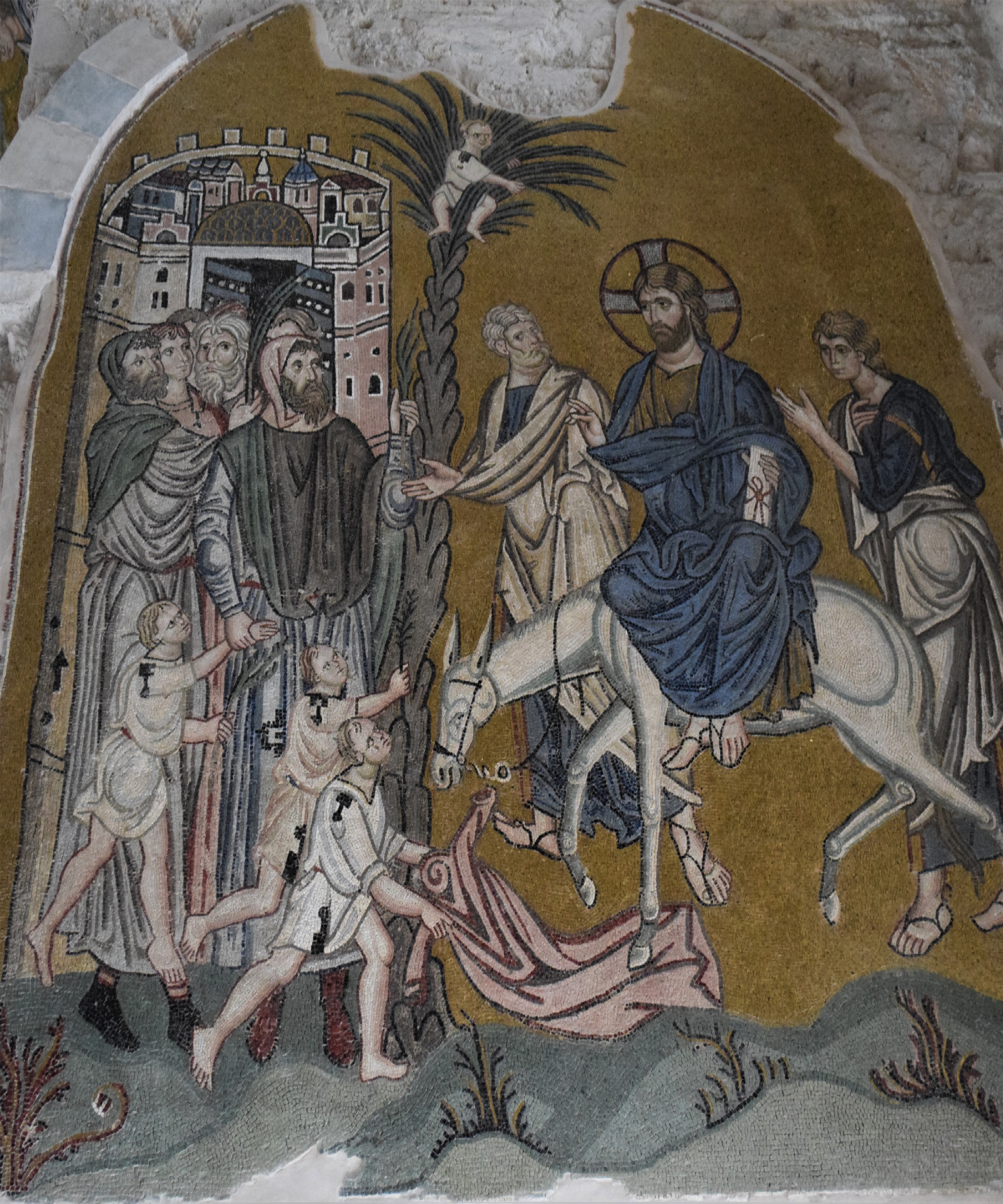
A mosaic depicting the Triumphal entry into Jerusalem inside the monastery.

Daphni or Dafni (Modern Greek: Δαφνί; Katharevousa: Δαφνίον, Daphnion) is an eleventh-century Byzantine monastery eleven kilometers (6.8 miles) northwest of central Athens in the suburb of Chaidari, south of Athinon Avenue. It is situated near the forest of the same name, on the Sacred Way that led to Eleusis. The forest covers about 18 km^{2} (7 mi^{2}), and surrounds a laurel grove. "Daphni" is the modern Greek name that means "laurel grove", derived from Daphneion (Lauretum).

The Daphni Monastery, along with the famous monasteries of Hosios Loukas near Delphi and Nea Moni on the island of Chios, are designated UNESCO World Heritage Sites for their significant historical and architectural value. These monasteries are famed as masterpieces of middle Byzantine architecture, and are especially noted for their sumptuous interior gold-ground mosaics.

== History ==
The Daphni Monastery was founded towards the end of the sixth century A.D. on the site of the Sanctuary of Apollo which had been desecrated by the Goths in 395. The Sanctuary of Apollo was built in the Ionic style using the thinnest and smallest columns. The columns stand on a base with an ornamental scroll at the top. A few of the columns of the temple have been preserved. One of the four Ionic columns of the ancient Sanctuary of Apollo remains at the site, as it was re-used in the Daphni Monastery. The other columns were removed and taken to London by Thomas Bruce, Earl of Elgin (best-known for taking the Parthenon Marbles). The columns, column bases, and column tops from the Sanctuary of Apollo are currently in the possession of the British Museum; they are currently not on display but can be seen on the museum’s website .

The first monastery on the site was constructed in the style of a castle with a basilica in the middle. It was fortified with enclosing walls and small cells that were usually just inside the walls and used by monks or nuns. The walls were attached to the church rather than standing free around the perimeter of the property and one of the columns from Apollo was built into the southern wall of the church. Some of the rectangular blocks of porous stone were also salvaged and used in the western outer wall of the church. This first monastery fell into decline when Greece was severely damaged following invasions of barbarians from the North and the sea in the ninth and tenth Centuries A.D.

During a period of renewed prosperity in the eleventh and twelfth centuries, the Daphni Monastery was restored. A new octagonal church, a refectory and a chapel for the cemetery were built. The old basilica was completely demolished, except for the enclosing walls and cells from the former church which were incorporated into the new church. Traces of old frescoes found on the walls show a person with bands, perhaps Emperor Basil II, holding a scroll. The craftsmanship used in the church construction suggests Basil II brought in workers from Constantinople.

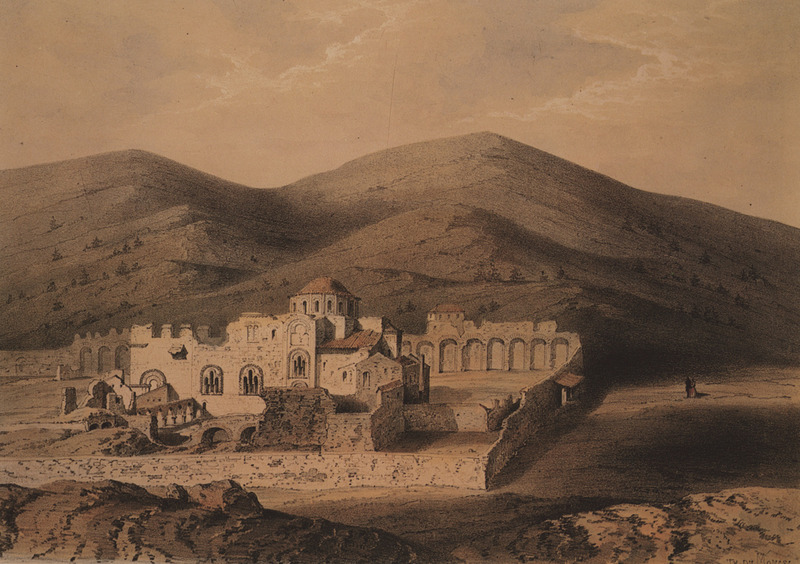
The Monastery of Daphni, drawn by Moncel Théodore (1843).

The Daphni Monastery fell into decline after it was sacked by Frankish crusaders in 1205. The region became part of the Duchy of Athens, under Othon de la Roche. Othon gave the Daphni Monastery to the Cistercian Abbey of Bellevaux, who added their own cloister and twin pointed arches in the Gothic style to the façade of the church. The Daphni Monastery became a popular burial place for Knights. In 1458, immediately after the coming of the Turks and the visit of Sultan Mehmed II to Athens, the Cistercians abandoned the Daphni Monastery and the Duchy of Athens was abolished.

== Architecture ==
The exterior of the church has a cloisonné style, which is very common for middle Byzantine churches in Greece. The cloisonné style of masonry consists of rectangular blocks of stone separated or framed on all four sides by bricks. The windows are set off from the cloisonné work by arched frames made of brick. The contrast between the light color of the stone blocks of the cloisonné and the red bricks around the windows and the orange roof create a sophisticated and understated elegance.

The floor plan for the Church of Daphni is a simple Greek cross-octagon arranged with various levels of light and illumination. The upper church, particularly the dome, symbolizes the heavens while the lower area symbolizes the earth. A square bay in the center of the church is covered by a broad dome. Squinches, small half-domes that span the corner of a square, are connected by tall L-shaped piers to form the transition from the square to the circle of the dome. The four squinches in the square bay transform it into an octagon. The wall surfaces fan out at the top above the squinches and join together to form the circular base of the dome.

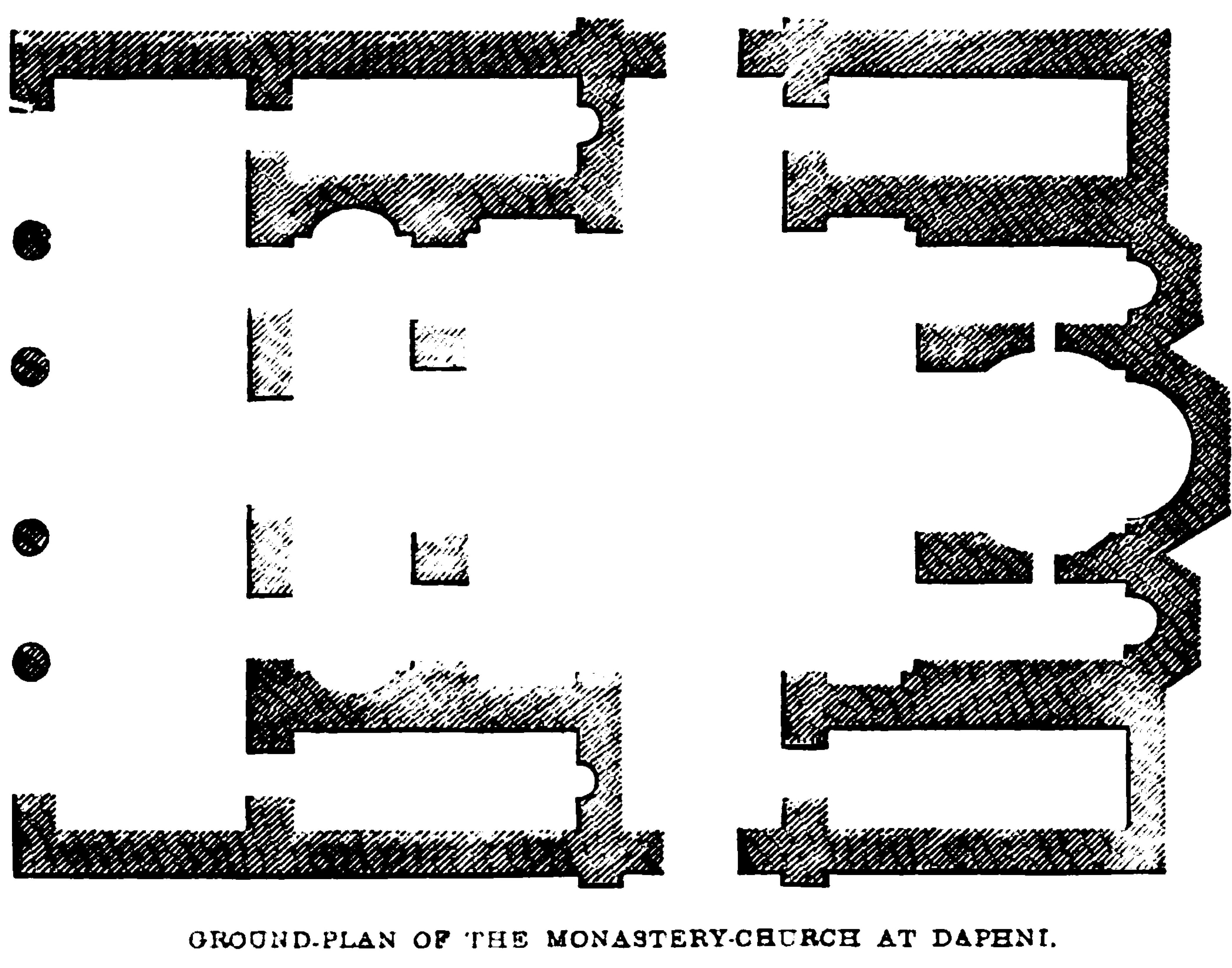
Ground Plan of the Monastery-Church at Daphni

A Greek cross is formed by four barrel-vaulted arms of the same length that project from the center bay. Small bays covered with groin vaults (ceilings made up of two barrel vaults) that intersect at right angles give the building its rectangular shape. The bays that fill in the cross are only one-story high and with a low-level of illumination to subordinate them from the Greek cross.

== Mosaics ==
The interior of the monastery has an elegant interplay of spaces and light with the windows at the base of the dome illuminating the vertical space above; as the space becomes taller, it also become brighter. This graduated light enhances the radiant gold-ground tesserae used to create the remarkable quality of the mosaics. The unknown artist was from the early Komnenian period (c. 1100). The wide assortment of colored shades of glass tesserae further enhances the mosaics. Several important studies have been conducted on the composition of the glass used in the tesserae for these mosaics as the unusually bright color of the gold-ground tesserae and the deep brilliance of the colors combine with important stylistic qualities to make these mosaics unique. One of the factors that identifies mosaics from different areas is the variance in glass used. The glass can be crafted locally or imported from other areas; in the case of Daphni, it is believed the glass was created on site. This group of mosaics is considered one of the most important and best-preserved mosaic cycles from this period. They are evidence of the iconographic and stylistic conceptions formulated at the end of the iconoclastic crisis (AD 843) by the Church of Constantinople. The decoration shows a rigid consistency in the distribution of subject, characteristic of Constantinopolitan art.

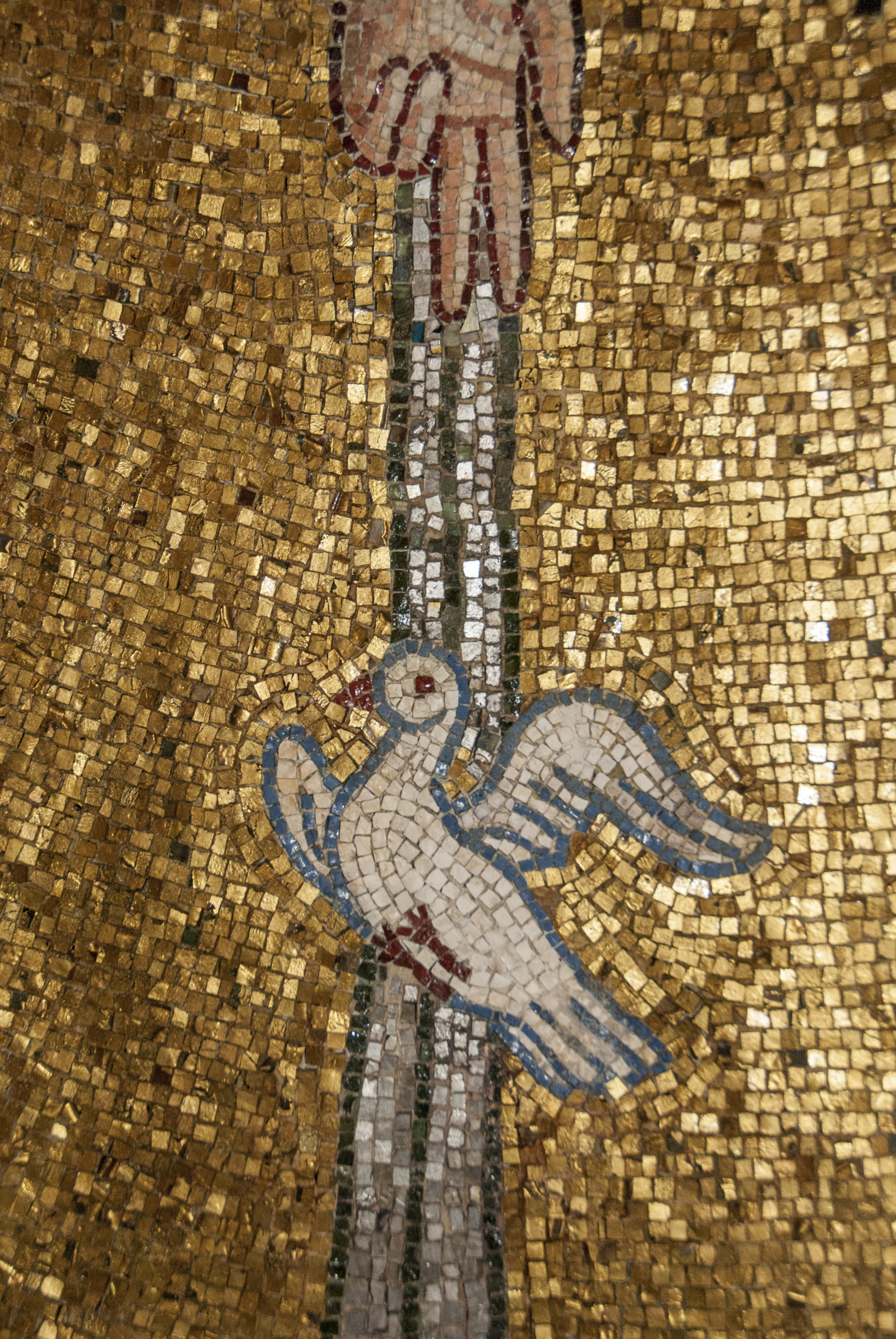
Mosaic depicting the Holy Spirit and the Hand of God

In Byzantine theology, the church building was a symbol of the Christian universe, intended to reflect the splendor of heaven. A standardized program in Byzantine churches established the order in which the representations were arranged. The most sacred characters were depicted in the dome and the apse, while below the dome scenes were arranged from higher to lower levels, relating to their level of religious importance.

Visitors to the church are immediately drawn to the most important and famous of the mosaics: Christ Pantocrator (Lord of the Universe) watching over all from the crown of the dome. He is depicted with a stern face and a threatening gaze with only his head and shoulders shown. This medallion is recognized as representing exceptional artistic quality: it has been described as “one of the greatest creations in art” and "[o]f all the Pantokrators in the Byzantine lands, from Kiev to Cefalu, this is the most awe-inspiring and convincing".

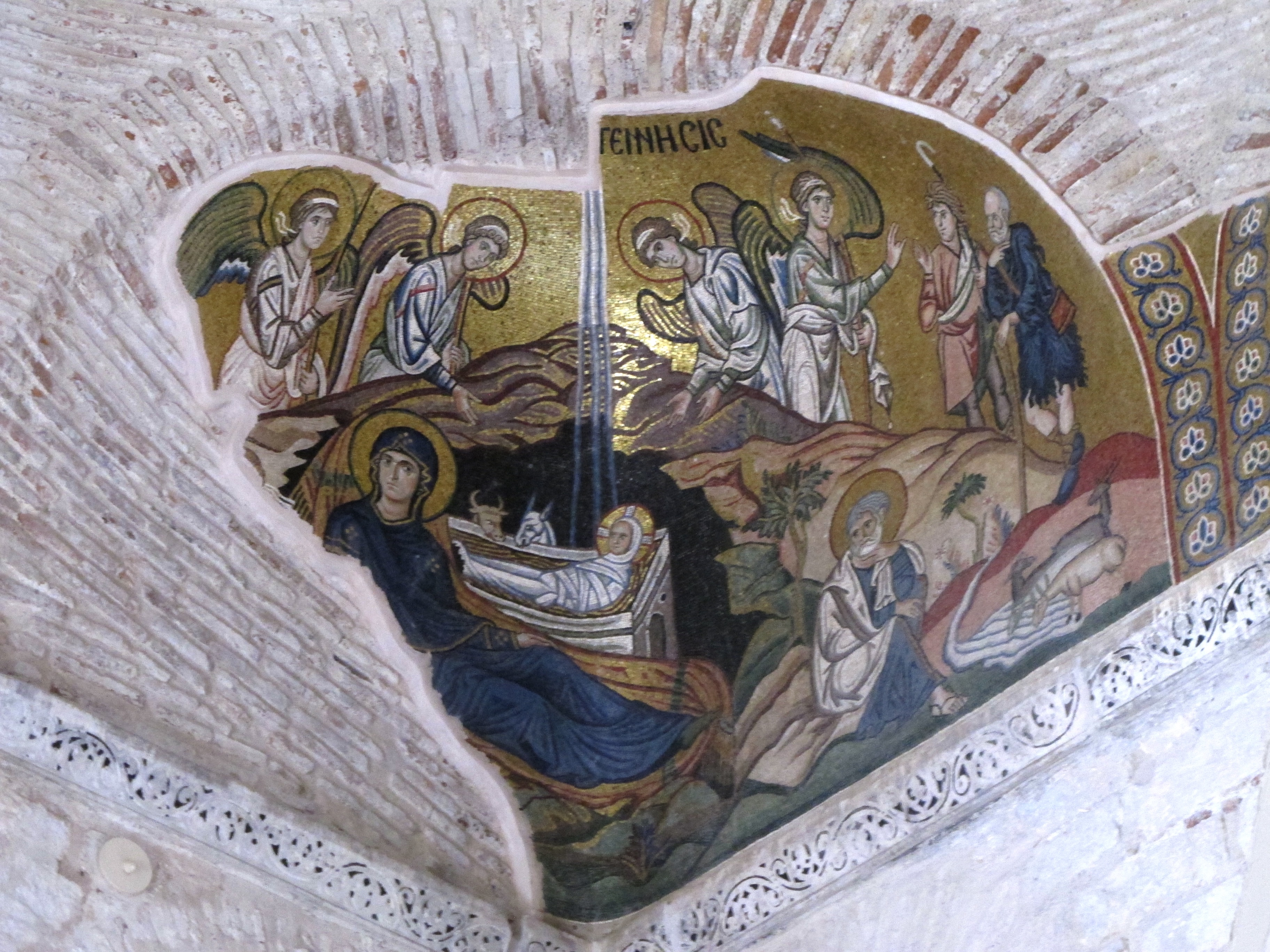
The Nativity of Jesus

Christ is wearing a purple robe and a blue mantle. He is the King of Kings and shows strength, austerity, and power. The artist created a bold and realistic drawing, executed with very simple means. The eyebrows are shown with a strong arch to accentuate the vertical lines and the long nose that intersects with the horizontal lines of the halo to create a symbolic cross. Several studies have been conducted in an attempt to determine whether significant changes have been made during restorations to the appearance of the Christ Pantocrator mosaic, but there is general agreement that changes have not been significant. Christ is surrounded by sixteen Prophets at the base of the dome, between the windows that illuminate Christ as the dominant figure in the church. The prophets are wearing ancient garments and hold a parchment containing text proclaiming the glory of Christ or the Second Coming.

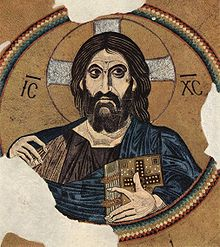
Christ Pantocrator

On the pendentives, there are four scenes from the life of Christ. The Crucifixion scene depicts three figures: Christ on the cross, with Mary and St. John at the foot of the cross, one on each side. The figures are arranged in the shape of a triangle against the empty golden background. Each figure is separate and unified with the other figures. This balanced arrangement is similar to the way Greek sculptors placed their figures in the pediments of temples. The figure of St. John is depicted in a bending position, with his weight on one leg – a pose used by Greek sculptors. The body of Christ is depicted in a classic, athletic style, but unlike Greek sculpture, the anatomy is not true to life. The faces of St. John and the Madonna have the flatness and heavy lines of the Byzantine style, but they express the calm of Greek statues.

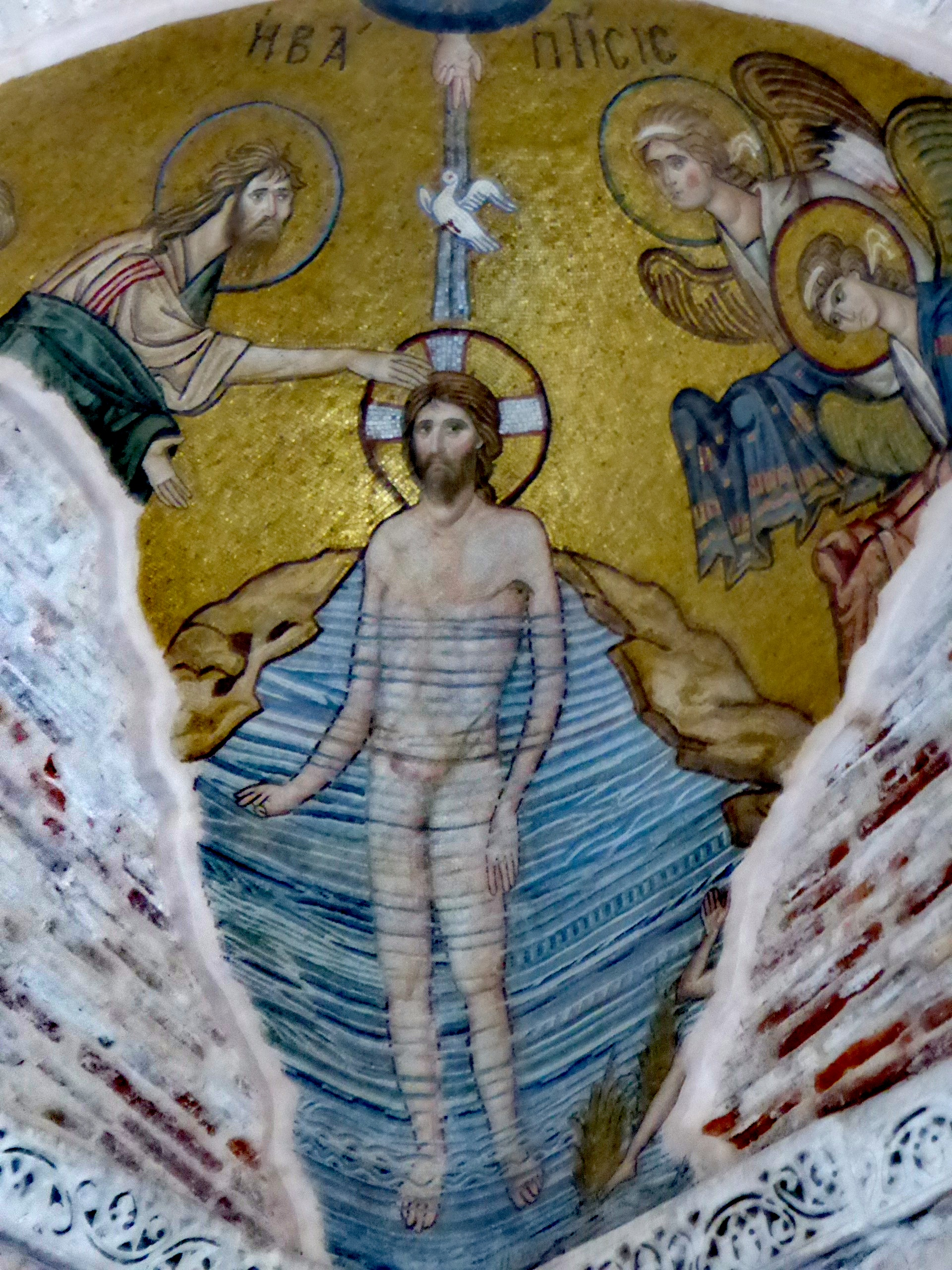
The Baptism of Jesus

According to the Encyclopædia Britannica, "the ensemble represents a visualization of the Christian cosmos, its effect created by an intricately conceived interplay of pictures and architecture. Space in fact fuses the decoration into one giant image, in which the ruler, hailed by the prophets surrounding him, presides in his sphere above the host of saints that people the lower part of the room."

Other important mosaics include: Prayers of Joachim and Anna, Annunciation of Joachim, The Virgin with Anna, The Washing of the Disciples, Christ at the Last Supper, The Crucifixion, The Resurrection, Dormition of the Mother of God, Angel to Receive the Mother of God, Prophet Sophonia, and St. Bacchus.

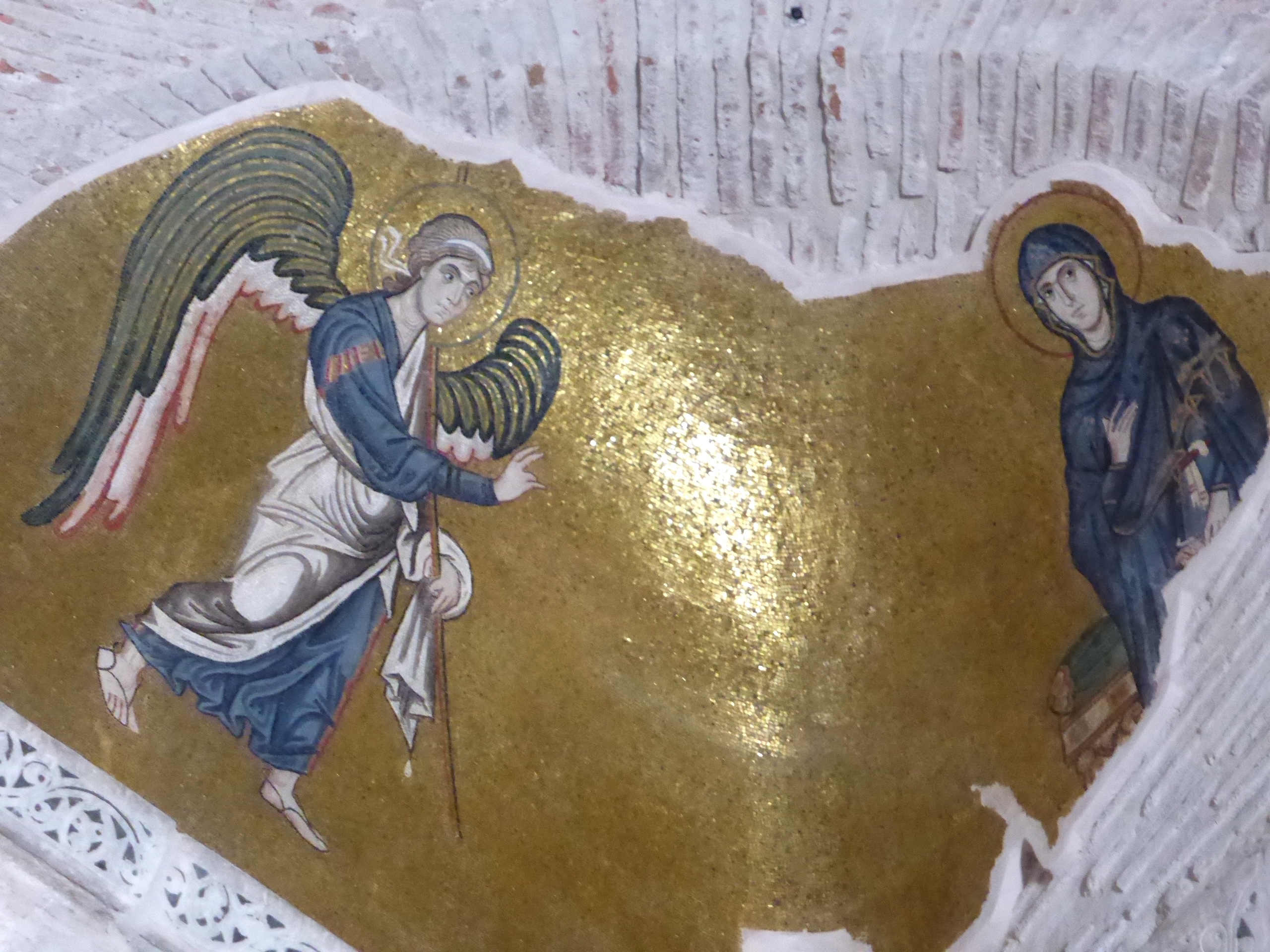
Depiction of the Annunciation, including Mary and the archangel Gabriel

Byzantine art often survives as an ecclesiastical art. The Daphni Monastery was built during a period of renaissance in culture and art and a return to classical traditions. The figures in the mosaics are more naturalistically represented, and they blend more smoothly into their surroundings. The decoration of the monastery is inspired by the spirit of the times. Faces are dematerialized, austere and depicted with unemotional expressions. The bodies are heavy and rigid, common characteristics in depicting the icons of the Bishops, Monks, and the Martyrs. The pictorial perspective, the figure styles and gestures, the modeling of the figures along with simplicity of design, and the dazzling splendor of color reflecting from the gold and silver tesserae distinguish the Daphni mosaics, among the mosaics of the eleventh and twelfth centuries, as particularly grand specimens of Byzantine art in general.

== See also ==
- Ancient Roman and Byzantine domes

== Bibliography ==
- Cormack, Robin. Byzantine Art. Oxford: Oxford University Press, 2002.
- Cormack, Robin. “Rediscovering the Christ Pantocrator at Delphi.” Journal of the Warburg and Courtauld Institutes 71:55-74
- Darling, Janina Kacena, Architecture of Greece. Westport, CT: Greenwood Press, 2004
- Diez, Ernest, and Otto Demus. Byzantine Mosaics in Greece. Hosios Lucas & Daphni. Cambridge, Massachusetts: Harvard University Press, 1931.
- Entwistle, Christopher, and Liz James. New Light on Old Glass: Recent Research on Byzantine Mosaics and Glass. London: British Museum, 2013.
- James, Liz. “Byzantine Glass Mosaic Tesserae: Some Material Considerations. “Byzantine and Modern Greek Studies 30, no. 1” (2006): 29-47
- Kyriacopoulou, Helen D., Argyrios Petronotes, Nilkos A. Belels, and T.S.R. Boase. The Daphni Monastery: History, Architecture, Mosaics. Athens: Society for Peloponnesian Studies, 1956.
- Lancaster, Osbert. Sailing to Byzantium: An Architectural Companion, John Murray, London, 1969.
- Setton, K.M. The Byzantine Empire. Vol. IV. The Cambridge Medieval History. The Latins in Greece and the Aegean from the Fourth Crusades to the End of the Middle Ages, Cambridge University Press, 1966, 409.
- Mosaic images: Ellopos http://www.ellopos.net
