= Derveni Tunnel =

Road tunnels in Greece

- Interactive map of Derveni Tunnel

Overview
- Location: Corinthia, Greece
- Coordinates: 38°07′48.9″N 22°25′16.5″E
- Status: Operational

Operation
- Work began: 2008
- Opened: 2 September 2016
- Operator: Olympia Odos S.A.
- Traffic: automotive
- Character: Twin-tube motorway tunnel

Technical
- Length: 480 m (1,570 ft) (first tunnel); 629 m (2,064 ft) (second tunnel)
- No. of lanes: 2x2

The Derveni Tunnels (Greek: Σήραγγες Δερβενίου) are two contiguous tunnels on the Patras - Corinth section of the A8 motorway. They bypass the coastal town of Derveni, located near the border with the Achaea regional unit. Works began in 2008 along with the whole motorway, but they were halted in 2011. They were again resumed in early 2014. It was opened to traffic on September 2, 2016, the same day of the opening of the Ancient Corinth-Kiato segment.
