= Athinon Avenue =

Street in Athens, Greece

Athinon Avenue (also known as Kavalas Avenue; Greek: Λεωφόρος Αθηνών or Λεωφόρος Καβάλας) is an avenue linking 1.5 km (0.93 mi) west of downtown Athens at Achilleos Street and Konstantinopouleos Avenue and the Piraeus interchange with the road linking Skaramagkas and Piraeus. For its entire length, it is a part of EO8 road, with the historic Iera Odos running parallel to the south. The Athens Bus Station is at 2.5 km (1.6 mi) with Antigonis Street but from the westbound it can only be accessed by Kifissou since Antigonis Street is one-way southward. The Athens Industrial Area lies to the south.

== History ==
The avenue became eight-laned in the 1950s and the 1960s westward and linked with the national road. Later, the interchange with Kifissou Avenue was added and took months to complete; later the Thivon Avenue interchange was added, both with two exiting lanes and two left lanes for staying on Athinon Avenue to decongest traffic. Between 1991 and 1993, the eastbound interchange and westbound entrance with the Konstantinopouleos Avenue began construction and resulted to shut off parts of Athinon Avenue and Achilleos Streets. The road detoured through Palamidou Street. It now avoids a railway crossing at which it congested traffic after its opening. Construction between 1992 and 2000 did not affect the avenue but the interchange at the bottom. Another link with the Aegaleo Ring of the Attiki Odos was planned to be made in 2012 but remains unfinished to this day due to controversies.

== Places ==
- Athens
- Aigaleo
- Peristeri
- Chaidari

== Junctions ==
- 1.5 km – Pallamidou and Patsis Streets
- 3 km - Interchange with Kifissou Avenue
- 3.5 km - residential street
- 4 km - Interchange with Thivon Street
- 5 km - road to Agia Varvara
- 6th km - road to Peristeri
- 8th km - street to Chaidari
- 9th km - Iera Odos and second street to Chaidari
- 10th km - Iera Odos
- 12th km - Skaramagkas – end of Athinon Avenue, continuation of EO8 road towards Corinth and Patras.
