= Geraneia Tunnel =

Tunnel on the Olympia Odos motorway

- Interactive map of Geraneia Tunnel

Overview
- Location: West Attica, Greece
- Coordinates: 37°58′23.9″N 23°18′01.4″E
- Status: Operational

Operation
- Work began: 1999
- Opened: July 2004
- Operator: Olympia Odos S.A.
- Traffic: automotive
- Character: Single-tube motorway tunnel

Technical
- Length: 930 m (3,050 ft)
- No. of lanes: 3

The Geraneia Tunnel (Greek: Σήραγγα Γεράνεια) is a tunnel on the Athens-Corinth section of the A8 motorway. Works began in 1999 as part of the construction of the Kakia Skala pass, one of the most dangerous road parts in Greece, with motorway standards. It was one of the first tunnels of the A8. It was opened to traffic in July 2004, along with the rest of the motorway segment, in time for the Athens Olympics.
