= Panagopoula Tunnel =

Road tunnel in Greece

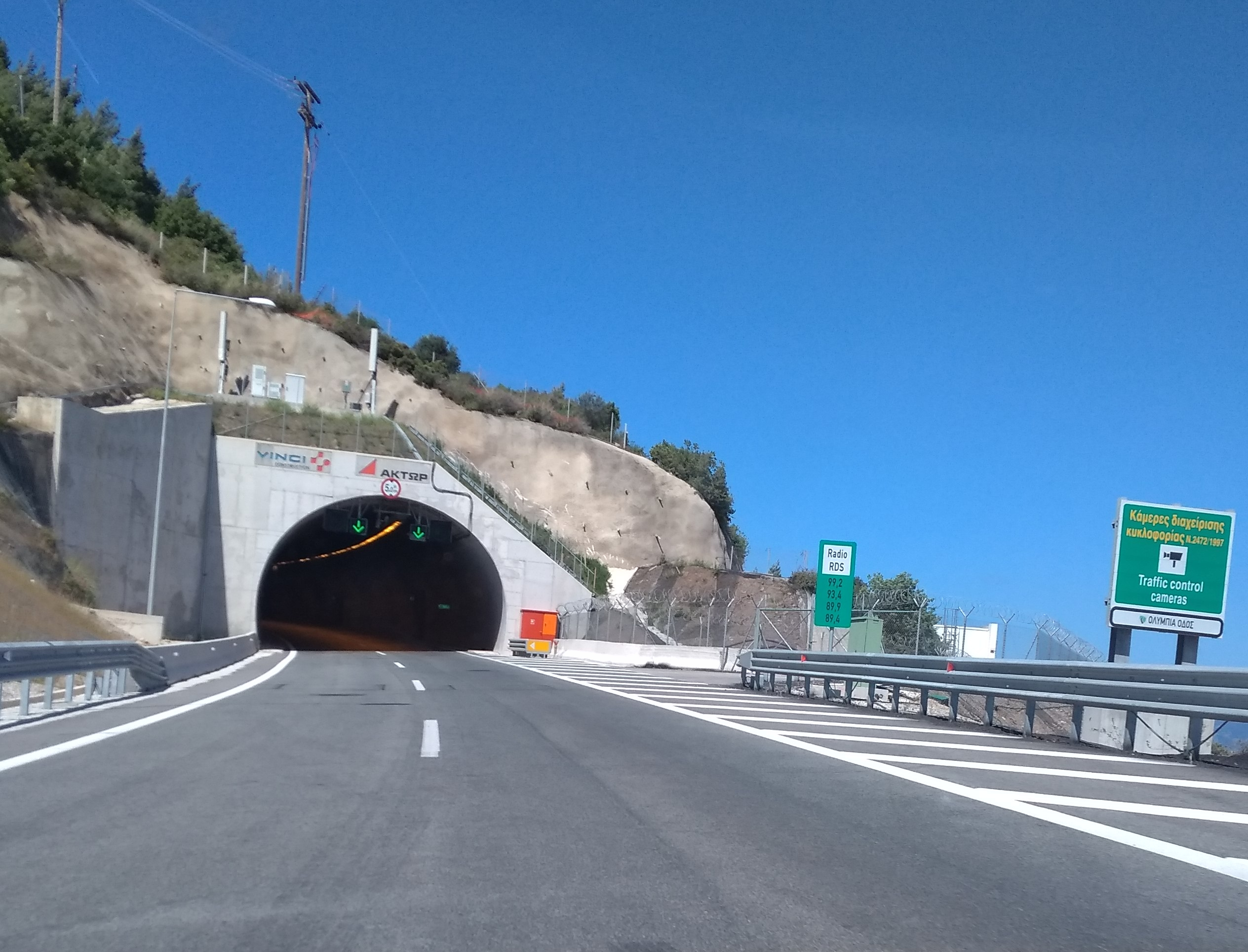
- The east entrance of Panagopoula tunnel (Section 2 - Corinth to Patras)
- Interactive map of Panagopoula Tunnel

Overview
- Location: Achaea, Greece
- Coordinates: 38°19′05.3″N 21°58′17.4″E
- Status: Operational

Operation
- Work began: 2008
- Opened: February 2017
- Operator: Olympia Odos S.A.
- Traffic: automotive
- Character: Twin-tube motorway tunnel

Technical
- Length: 548 m (1,798 ft) + 581 m (1,906 ft) + 4,033 m (13,232 ft) (to Athens); 3,179 m (10,430 ft) (to Patras)
- No. of lanes: 2x2

The Panagopoula Tunnel (Greek: Σήραγγα Παναγοπούλας) is a tunnel on the Corinth-Patras section of the A8 motorway. The name comes from the namesake area of Panagopoula. It consists of two separate sections, one which has a length of 4,018 m (Panagopoula 1) used by vehicles travelling from Patras to Athens, and one which has a length of 3,182 m (Panagopoula 2) used by vehicles travelling from the opposite direction, from Athens to Patras. Works began in 2008 along with the whole motorway, but they were halted in 2011. They were again resumed in early 2014.

The 4 km tunnel is the longest road tunnel of the whole A8 and the third longest in Greece It was opened to traffic in late February 2017, a month earlier than the rest of the motorway.
