= Greek National Road 8 =

Trunk road in Greece

National Road 8
- Εθνική Οδός 8
- Route of the EO8 road, in blue

Route information
- Length: 214.4 km (133.2 mi)
- Existed: 9 July 1963–present
- History: Constructed late 1890s–1900s

Major junctions
- East end: Athens
- West end: Patras

Location
- Country: Greece
- Regions: Attica; Peloponnese; Western Greece
- Primary destinations: Athens; Corinth; Kiato; Derveni; Aigio; Rio; Patras

Highway system
- Highways in Greece; Motorways; National roads
← EO7	→ EO8a

Greek National Road 8 (Greek: Εθνική Οδός 8, abbreviated as EO8, common name: old Athens-Patras national road) is a single carriageway with at-grade intersections in the Attica, Peloponnese and West Greece regions. It connects Athens with the cities of Corinth and Patras. Since the 1960s it has been replaced for most of its length with the National Road 8A, a limited-access toll road that bypasses most towns, as the major route to the Peloponnese. The EO8a has since been upgraded to the A8 motorway.

National Road 8 passes along the northern coast of the Saronic Gulf, through the Isthmus of Corinth and further, along the southern coast of the Gulf of Corinth, and ending in downtown Patras. It runs through five regional units: Central Athens, West Athens, West Attica, Corinthia and Achaea. Since the opening of National Road 8A it is mainly used for local traffic in the coastal towns.

== Original route ==
Ministerial Decision G25871 of 9 July 1963 created the EO8 from part of the original alignment of the EO1 between Athens and Elefsina, and one half of the short-lived (1955–1963) EO51 from Elefsina to Patras: the original alignment of the EO8 ran between Athens in the east and Patras in the west, via Corinth, Kiato, Derveni, Aigio and Rio.

== Present route ==
Today, the EO8 bypasses Megara, whereas the original alignment ran through the town. In Athens, the EO8 currently runs via Athinon Avenue instead of Iera Odos and Egaleo.

Additionally, the EO8a and the A8 (Athens–Patras) runs parallel to the EO8 from Patras to Eleusis, although it bypasses many villages and towns that the EO8 directly serve. The remaining sections of the EO8a (between Corinth and Rio) will be upgraded to be part of the A8, and the EO8 will become a non-motorway detour.

Apart from the EO8a and A8, the EO8 has connections with (from east to west) the EO1, EO56, A1, EO58, EO3, EO7, EO31, EO5, EO33 and EO9: the EO58, a short airport road to the Eleusis Airbase, also branches off from the EO8.
