= Haidari =

Haïdari Χαϊδάρι
- Municipality
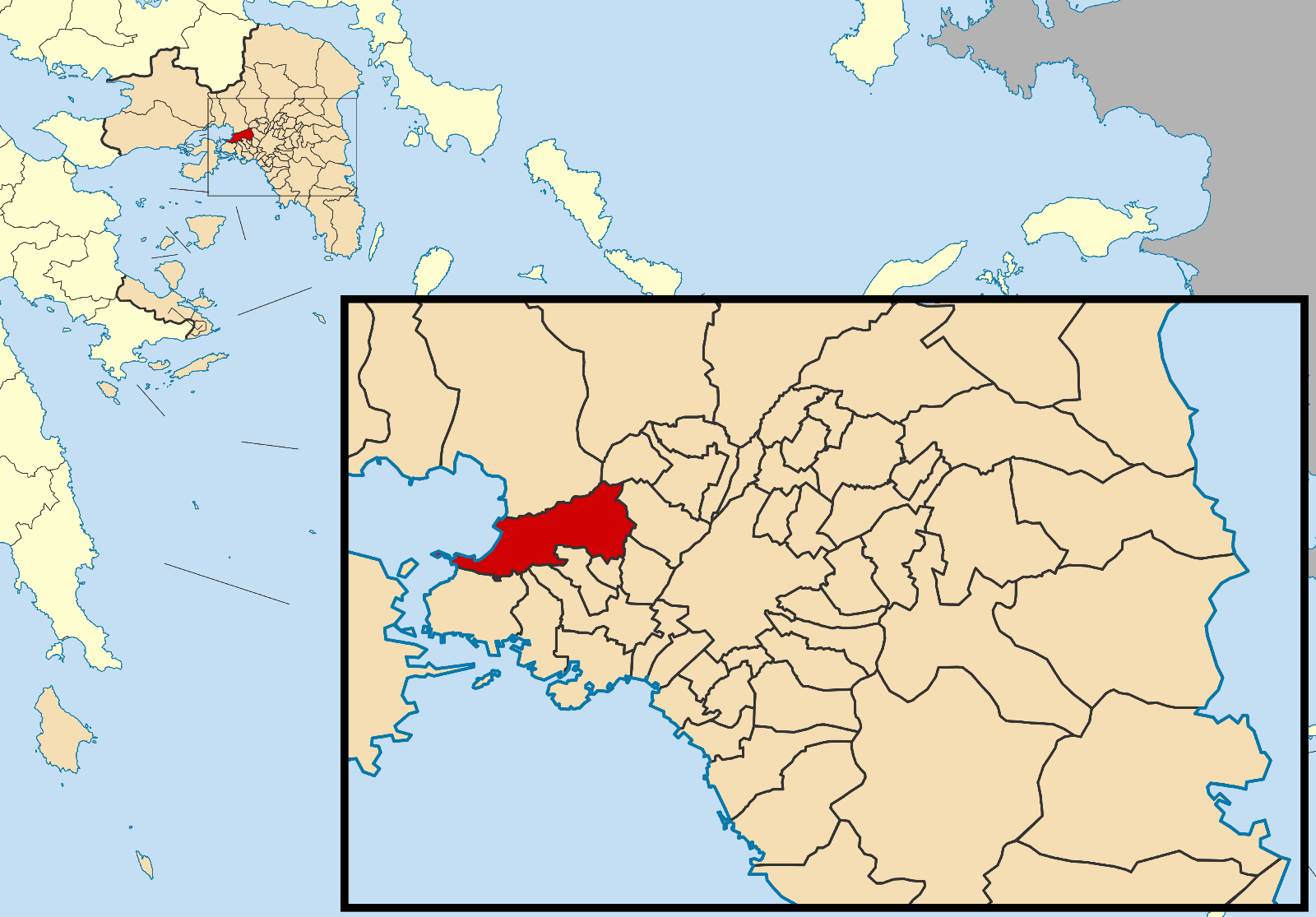

- Location within Greece
- Coordinates: 38°1′N 23°39′E
- Country: Greece
- Administrative region: Attica
- Regional unit: West Athens

Government
  - Mayor: Michail Selekos (since 2023)

Area
  - Municipality: 22.655 km^{2} (8.747 sq mi)
- Elevation: 95 m (312 ft)

Population (2021)
  - Municipality: 47,051
  - Density: 2,076.8/km^{2} (5,379.0/sq mi)
- Time zone: UTC+2 (EET)
  - Summer (DST): UTC+3 (EEST)
- Postal code: 124 6x
- Area code: 210 5xxxxxx
- Vehicle registration: Z
- Website: www.haidari.gr

Haidari (Greek: Χαϊδάρι, Chaidari) is a suburban town in the western part of the Athens agglomeration, west of the city center of Athens, in Greece.

== Geography ==
The municipality has an area of 22.655 km^{2}. The geography of the municipality of Haidari is diverse: the eastern part, where the town Haidari is situated, is densely populated and forms a continuous built up area with the inner suburbs of central Athens. The rocky Aigaleo hills run through the central part of the municipality. The pine forest of Dafni and the Daphni Monastery lie on the eastern slopes of Aigaleo. The westernmost part of Haidari is the small industrial port town Skaramagkas, on the Saronic Gulf near Eleusis. The main roads of Haidari are the Greek National Road 8 (the old road from Athens to Corinth) and the Iera odos.

== History ==
During the Turkish rule Haidari belonged to a certain Haydar Pasha, which may have been a nickname from the Arabic word haydar, meaning 'lion'.

=== Concentration camp ===
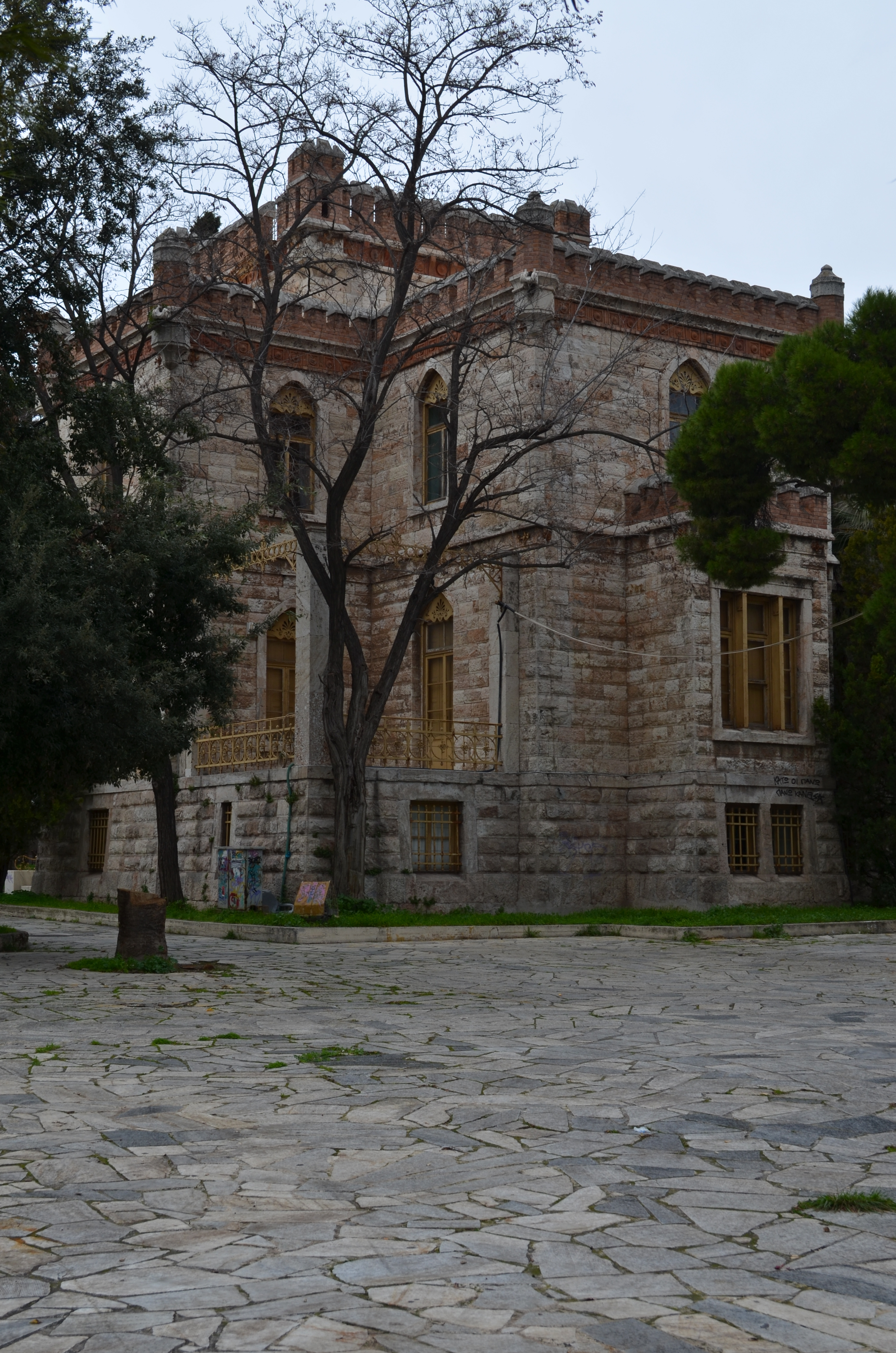
View of Palataki tower in Chaidari

The Haidari concentration camp (Greek: στρατόπεδο συγκέντρωσης Χαϊδαρίου, stratópedo syngéntrosis Chaidaríou, German: KZ Chaidari) was a concentration camp operated by the German Schutzstaffel in Haidari during the Axis Occupation of Greece from September 1943 to September 1944.

The camp is now a monument to the Greek Resistance.

== Sights of Interest ==
- Daphni Monastery
- Palataki Tower
- Julia & Alexander N. Diomedes Botanic Garden

== See also ==
- Haidari FC

== Historical population ==
Year	Town	Municipality
1981	-	47,396
1991	44,831	47,437
2001	45,227	46,276
2011	45,642	46,897
2021	-	47,051
