= Panagopoula =

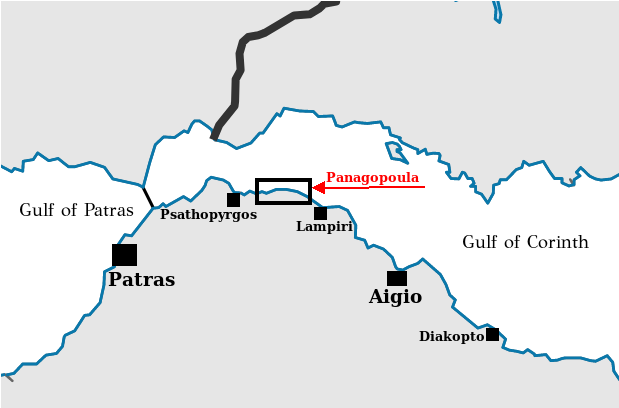
The region of Panagopoula

Panagopoula (Greek: Παναγοπούλα) is a coastal region in north Peloponnese between the villages of Psathopyrgos and Lampiri. It is a narrow strip of land between the foothills of mount Panachaiko and the Gulf of Corinth. The land is the last remaining intact part of a large pine tree forest which once was covering all of the mountainous areas above the coast, but it was severely destroyed by multiple forest fires in the previous 20–30 years. Though abandoned by the local authorities it still remains a popular destination for locals and tourists and in the dozen of small pebble beaches, visitors can find some beach bars, restaurants, and camping sites.

== Panagopoula landslide zone ==
The area of Panagopoula is prone to slope instability and in the past, there have been serious landslides that created problems to the road network. The most serious incident took place in 1971 when for 12 days there was no road and rail connection between Patras and Aigio and for that reason, ferry-boats were used to bypass the landslide zone.

== Panagopoula tunnels ==
The name Panagopoula became more widely known after the completion of the construction of a 4 km road tunnel (Panagopoula Tunnel) in the area, which is currently the third longest road tunnel in Greece. In the same area, another equally long railway tunnel (4.5 km) is under construction as part of the new railway line Athens-Corinth-Patras.

== Gallery ==
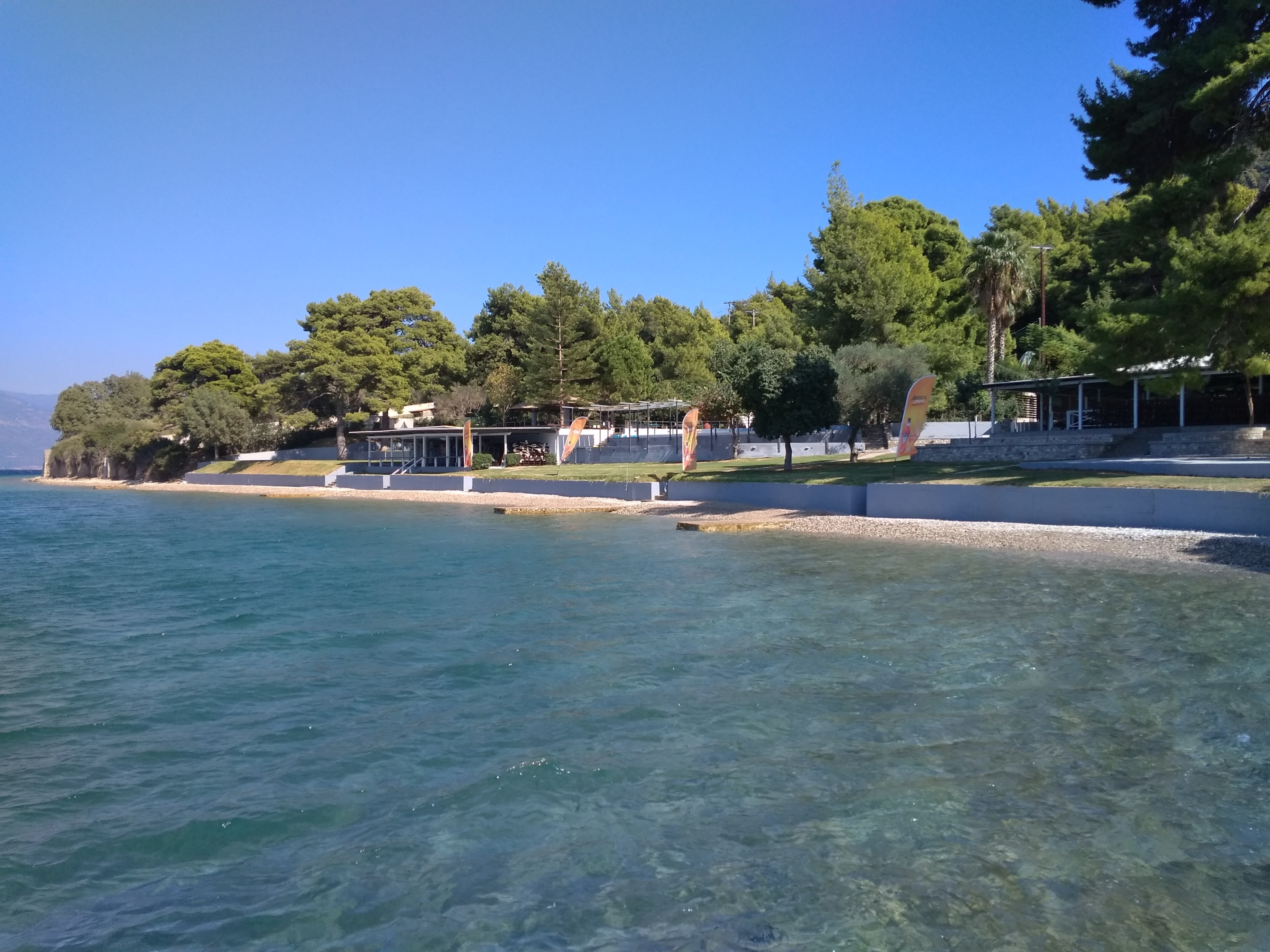
Coastal beach-bar restaurant in the region of Panagopoula

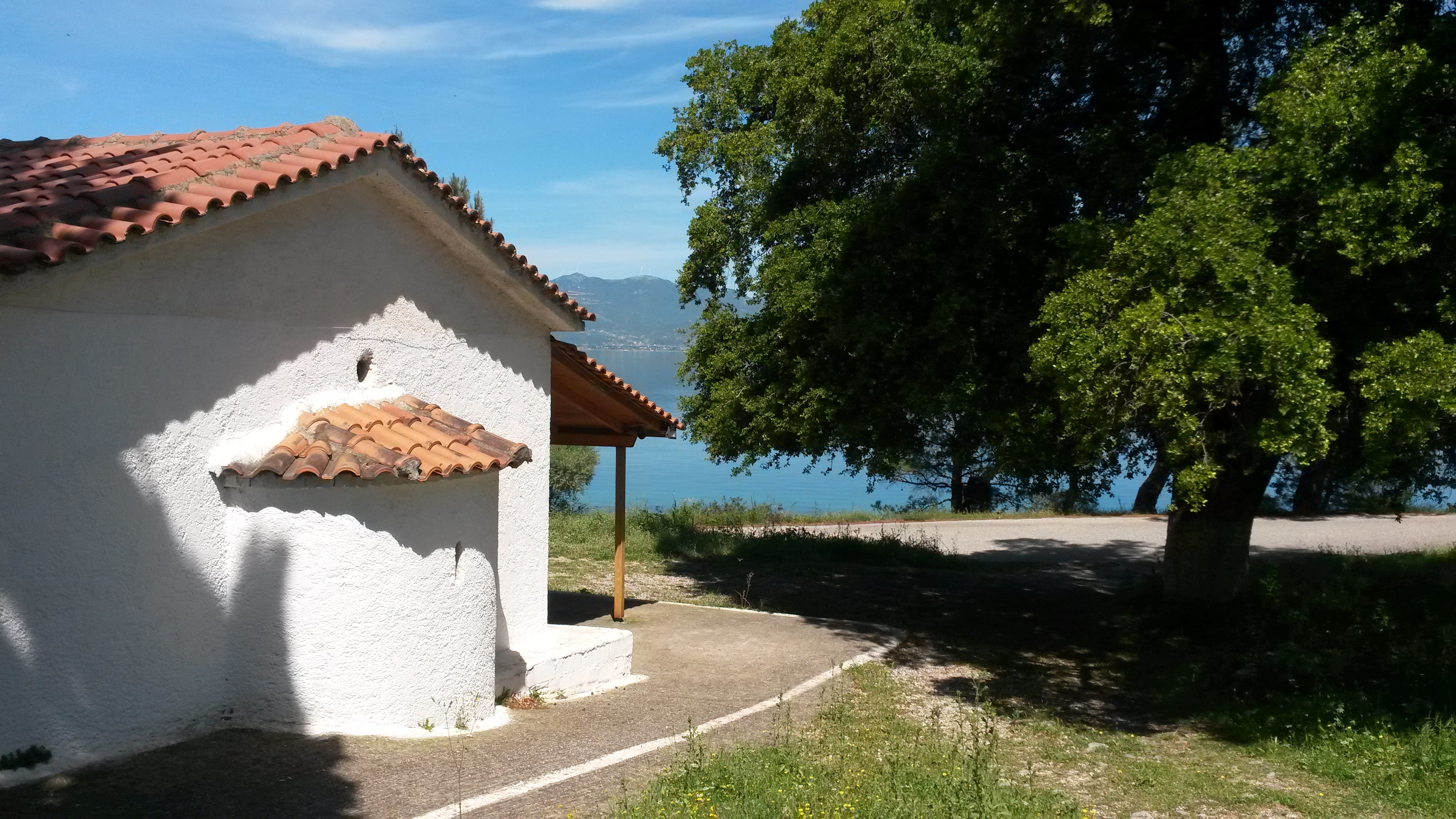
The small orthodox church of Life-giving Spring (Zoodochos Pigi) in Panagopoula.

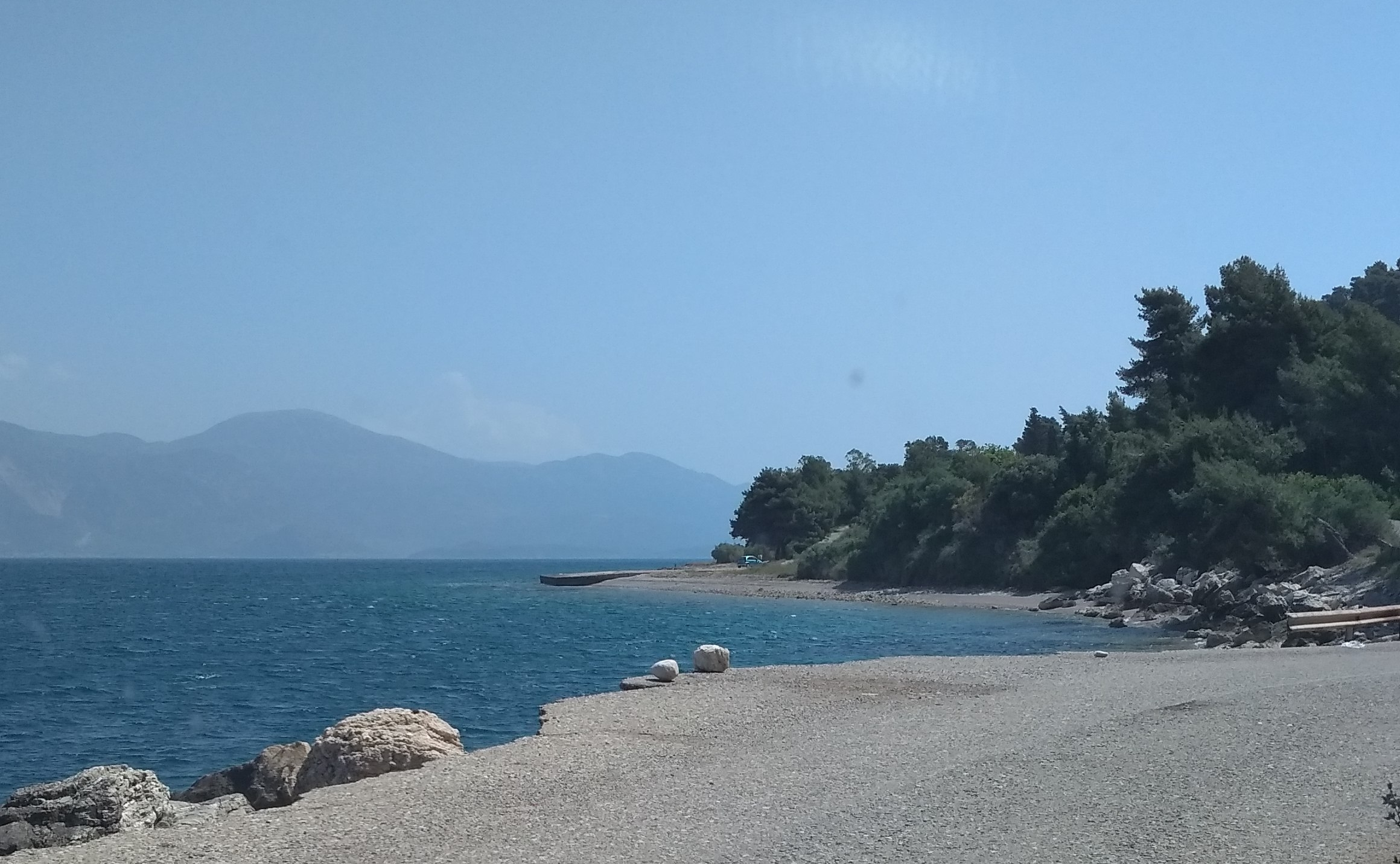
Small beach in the region of Panagopoula.

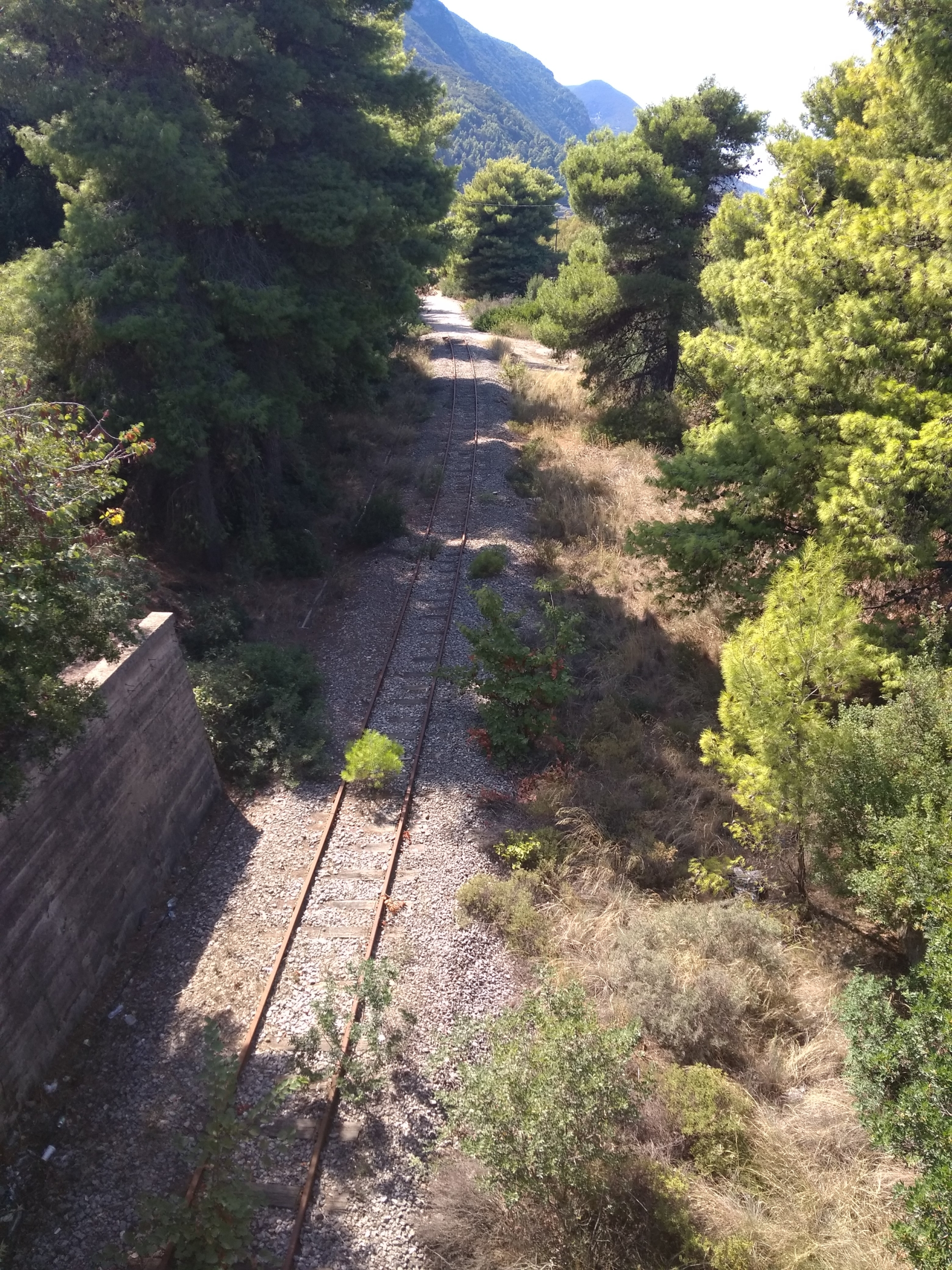
Abandoned railway line in Panagopoula. It used to be part of the now-closed metric railway line Athens-Corinth-Patras. A new railway tunnel is under construction.
