= Greek National Road 8a =

Highway of Greece connecting the cities of Athens, Corinth and Patras

National Road 8a
- Εθνική Οδός 8α
- Route of the EO8a road, in blue
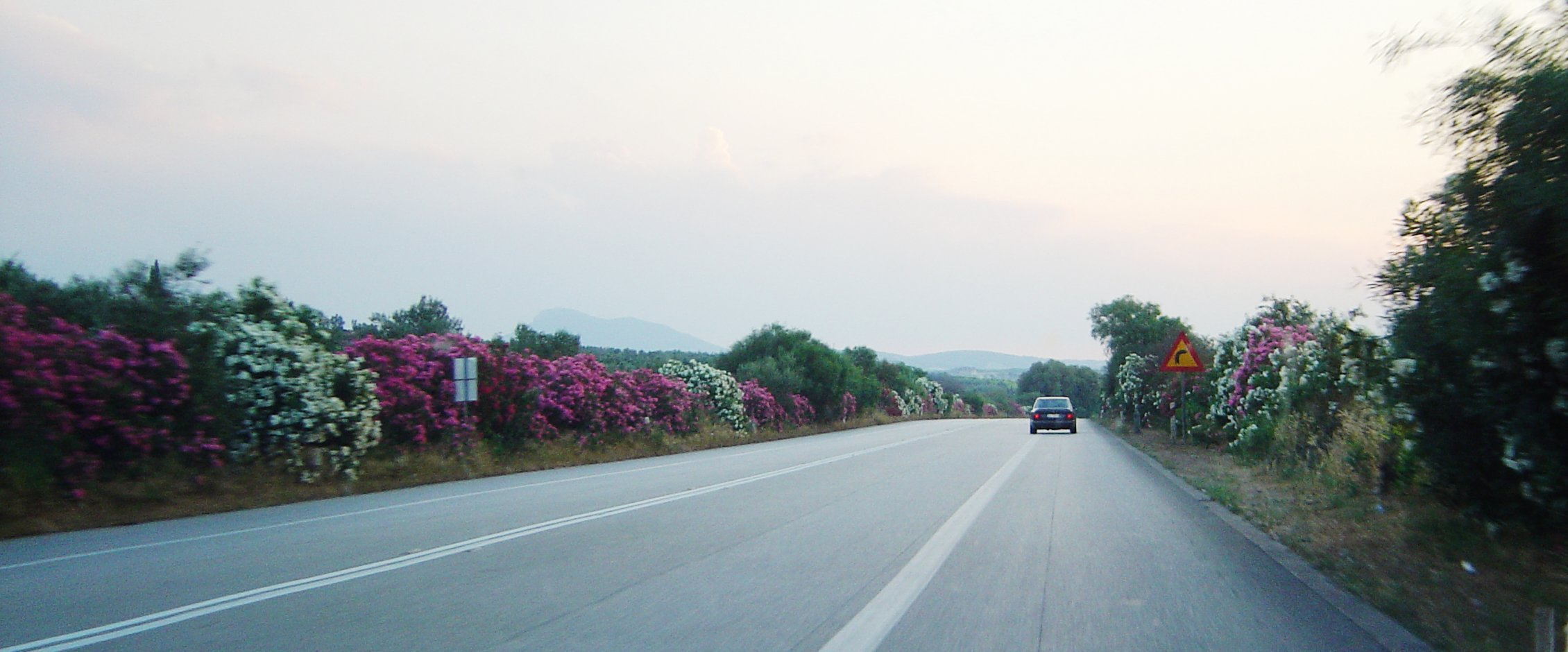
- A section of the EO8a

Route information
- Auxiliary route of EO8
- Length: 12.5 km (7.8 mi)
- Existed: 24 July 1995–present
- History: Constructed 1962–1973; Largely replaced by the A8 1997–2017

Major junctions
- East end: Elefsina (bypass)
- West end: Patras

Location
- Country: Greece
- Regions: Attica; Peloponnese; Western Greece
- Primary destinations: Elefsina (bypass); Corinth (bypass); Kastellokampos; Patras

Highway system
- Highways in Greece; Motorways; National roads
← EO8	→ EO9

Greek National Road 8a (Greek: Εθνική Οδός 8α, abbreviated as EO8a) was a toll road in the Attica, Peloponnese and West Greece regions. It connected Athens with the cities of Corinth and Patras. It was built in the 1960s as a replacement for the old National Road 8 as the major route to the Peloponnese, and bypasses most towns. The National Road 8a has gradually been upgraded to a motorway, the A8. Since April 2017, the complete length of the A8 motorway has been operational.

The EO8a started east of Eleusis, where it branched off the old EO8 as a limited-access dual carriageway. Between Megara and Kineta the motorway passed through several tunnels. Its western end was the interchange with the A5 Ionia Odos, near Rio, northeast of Patras.

The total length of the route was 215 km. The eastern section, between Eleusis and Corinth, was part of European route E94. The western section, between Corinth and Rio, was part of European route E65.

== Construction ==
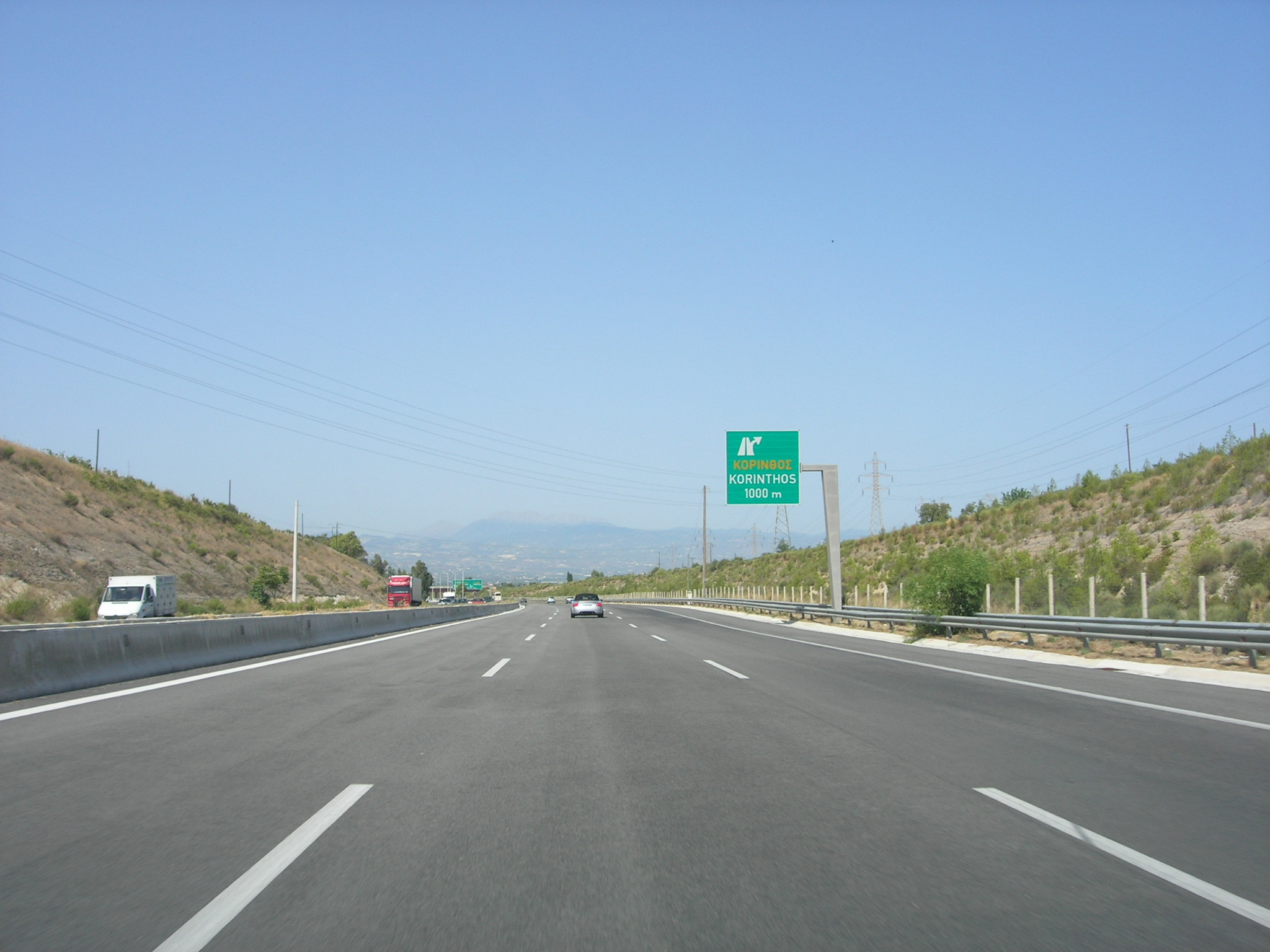
The road near the Corinth interchange.

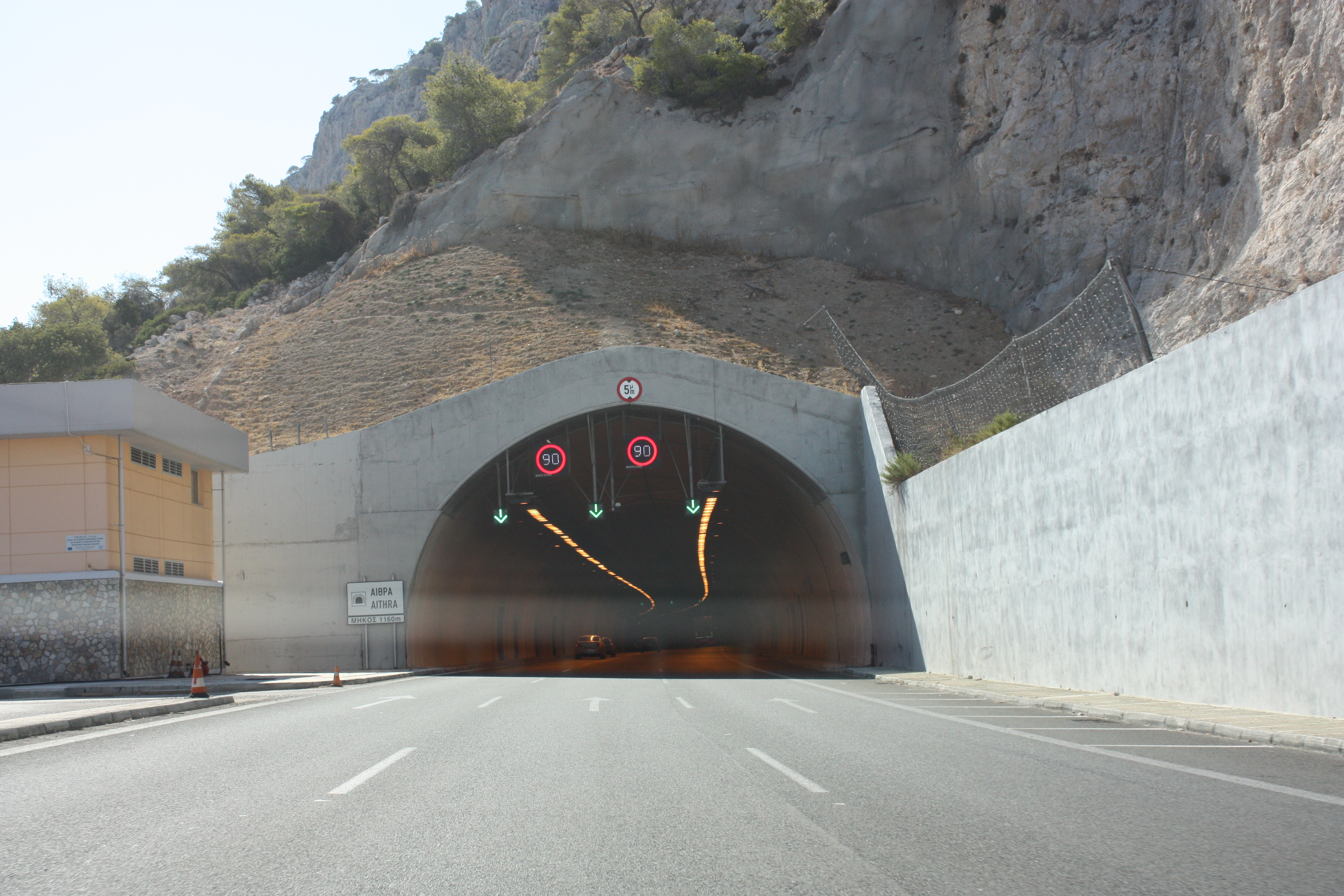
Aithra tunnel, Kakia Skala

The total length of the EO8a was delivered gradually between 1962 and 1973, replacing the older EO8. The section which first opened in November 1962, was the Athens–Corinth route, forming part of European route E94 (although the section Megara–Kineta (Kakia Skala pass) opened in late 1964, with motorway characteristics). The section Corinth–Patras was the next to follow in 1969, as a 14m width undivided road (except for the Aigio bypass, which opened in 1973 also with motorway characteristics).

Throughout the 1990s, the E94 part of the route was upgraded to motorway standards; while between 1999 and 2006, further upgrades took place at the Kakia Skala pass, converting a rather narrow and hazardous section of motorway into a state-of-the-art modern motorway, with 3 lanes per direction and a network of five tunnels and several bridges. Between 1997 and 2015, the expanded section ended near Corinth, from which it continued as a limited-access single carriageway. In 2015 the upgraded section ended near Zevgolateio and in 2016 it ended at Kiato: the remainder, between Kiato and Rio, was opened in April 2017.

== Current route ==
Three sections of the EO8a survive: the bypass north of Elefsina, the bypass south of Corinth, and a section between Kastellokampos and Patras. The Elefsina section connects with the EO8 and EO58 to the east, and the A8 and EO3 to the west; the Corinth section connects with the EO8 to the east and the A7 to the west; and the Kastellokampos–Patras section connects with the A5 to the north and the EO8 to the south.
