= Hochtief Concessions =

- Company type: GmbH
- Industry: Infrastructure investor and operator
- Founded: June 15, 2008
- Headquarters: Essen, Germany
- Area served: Global
- Key people: CEO: Henner Mahlstedt; CFO: Michael Tönnesmann
- Revenue: €24bn (2014)
- Net income: €250m (2014)
- Number of employees: 219 (average for 2008, status: Dec. 12, 2008)
- Parent: Hochtief
- Website: hochtief-concessions.com

Hochtief Concessions GmbH is a German business, fully owned subsidiary of the Hochtief Group and is responsible for the development and implementation of concessions and operator projects. Its business areas include airports, roads, social infrastructure/public-sector building construction and further public-private partnership (PPP) projects handled together with subsidiaries AviAlliance and Hochtief PPP Solutions.

== Portfolio ==
The company's portfolio has a total value of about EUR 1.5 billion and currently comprises 89 schools, two city halls, a service center, a military base, two geothermal energy projects, seven roads, six airport holdings as well as two investment partnerships.

== Investment partnerships ==
Investment partnerships are in place with Hochtief AirPort Capital GmbH & Co. KGaA and Hochtief PPP Schools Capital Ltd. as well as with subsidiary Hochtief AirPort Retail SH.P.K. Via Hochtief AirPort, the company also has a 100 percent interest in Transport and Logistics Consultancy Ltd. from the UK.

== Facts and figures ==
The company was founded in 2008 and has its registered offices in Essen. Pre-tax earnings in 2008 amounted to EUR 109.6 million, of which EUR 96.5 million from Hochtief AirPort and EUR 13.1 million from Hochtief PPP Solutions. The portfolio value totaled EUR 1,544.1 billion, with airports accounting for EUR 1,245.6, roads for EUR 208.3 and social infrastructure projects for EUR 53.0.
