= Tsakona Arch Bridge =

Tsakona Arch Bridge Τοξωτή Γέφυρα Τσακώνας
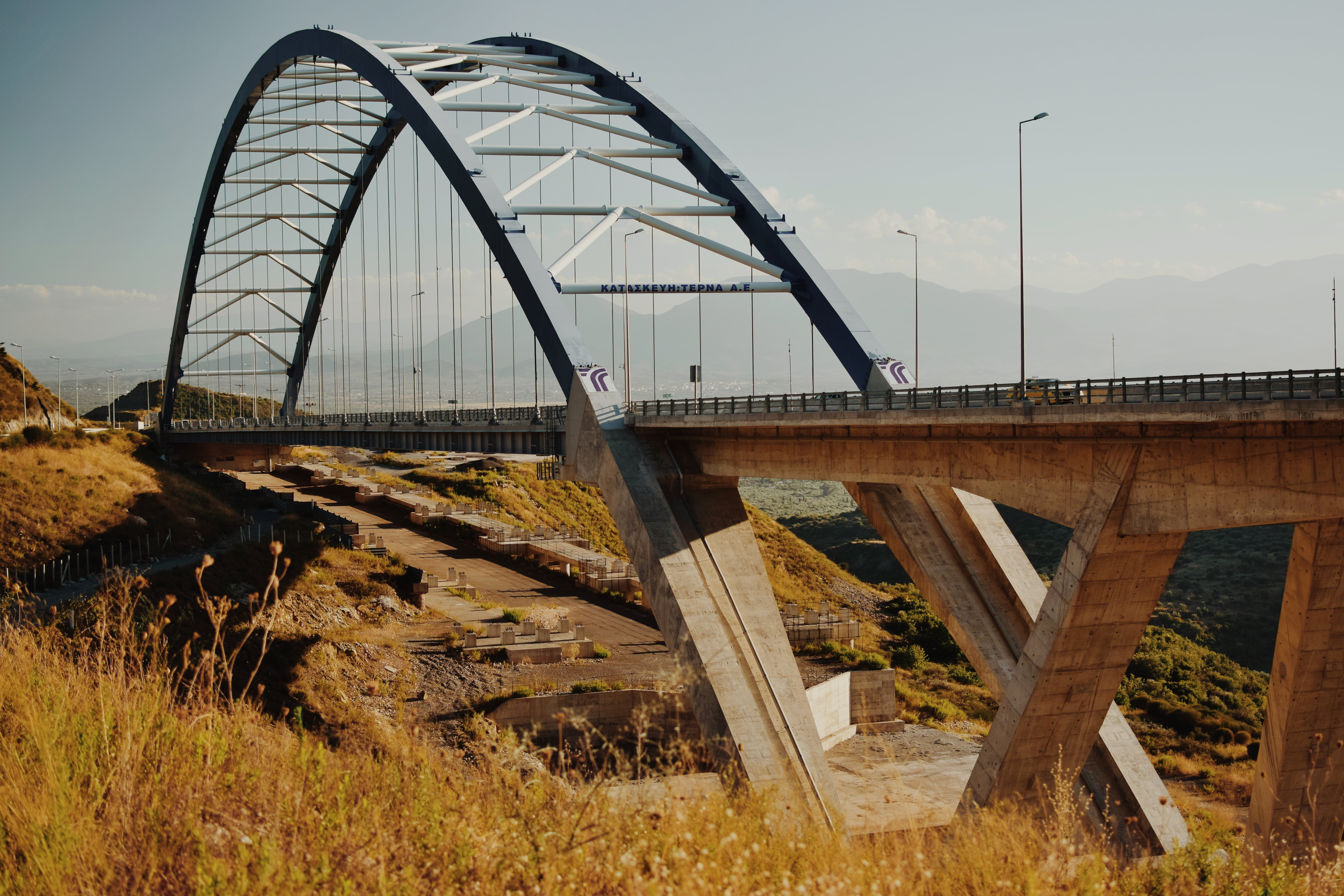
- Coordinates: 37°17′45″N 22°01′32″E
- Carries: 4 lanes of the A7 motorway (E65)
- Crosses: Tsakona Valley
- Locale: Tsakona & Paradiseia, near Megalopoli, Greece
- Owner: Greek State
- Maintained by: Moreas SA, J/V ALPINE BAU-ΤΕRNA SA

Characteristics
- Design: Arch bridge
- Total length: 490 meters (1,610 ft)
- Width: 27 meters (89 ft)
- Longest span: 300 meters (980 ft)

History
- Opened: 28 February 2016

Location
- Interactive map of Tsakona Arch Bridge; Τοξωτή Γέφυρα Τσακώνας

The Tsakona Arch Bridge (Greek: Τοξωτή Γέφυρα Τσακώνας), located in Arcadia, southern Greece, is one of the world's longest multi-span arch bridges. It crosses the Tsakona Valley, spanning a dangerous location near Megalopoli where there have been many landslides.

== Construction ==
The Tsakona Arch Bridge, with a length of 490 meters, was the part of the Paradeisia–Tsakona axis Tripolis–Kalamata road route to be completed. It was delivered for the Greek state by the Moreas consortium. The project leader Nikos Donas stated that the bridge was one of the most difficult engineering projects, after the Charilaos Trikoupis Bridge. It was budgeted at €94 million but there were significant cost overruns, due largely to the complexity of building in challenging and unstable geological conditions. The original studies made for construction of the bridge had also underestimated the challenges associated with construction, causing budget and time overruns. The final cost was €131.5 million.

The bridge is supported at three points: one at each end (abutments) and one that is closer to the top of the pier. The last is the most important: it is basically a giant 'prefab', which ensures the stability of the bridge. From the pier starts the arch of the bridge, with a maximum height of 30 meters. The two arches, one on each side, support the metal part of the bridge on which the road is located.

Construction on the bridge started in 2008; it was opened for traffic in January 2016.
