= Sacred Way =

Ancient road in Greece

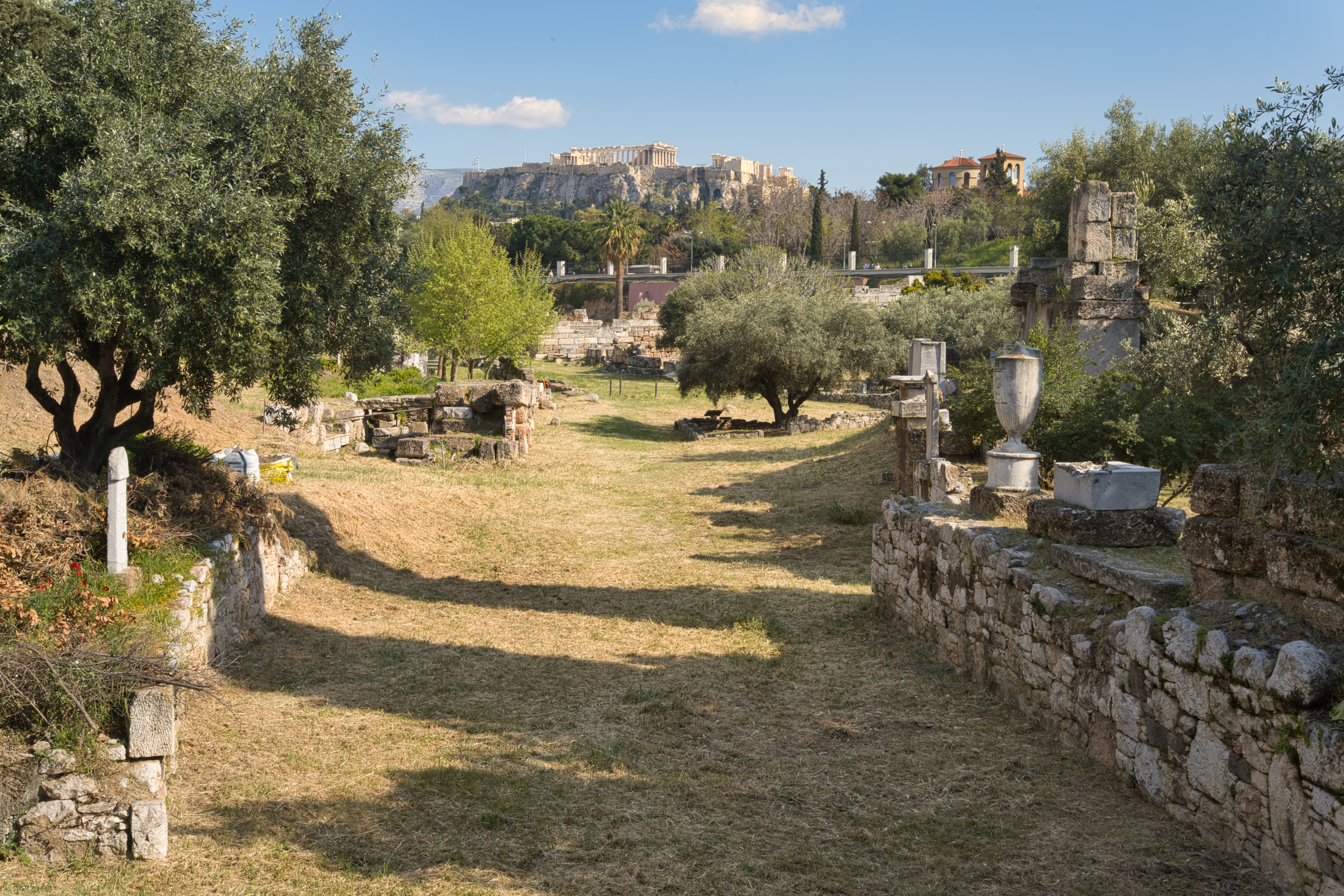
The Sacred Way in the Kerameikos Cemetery

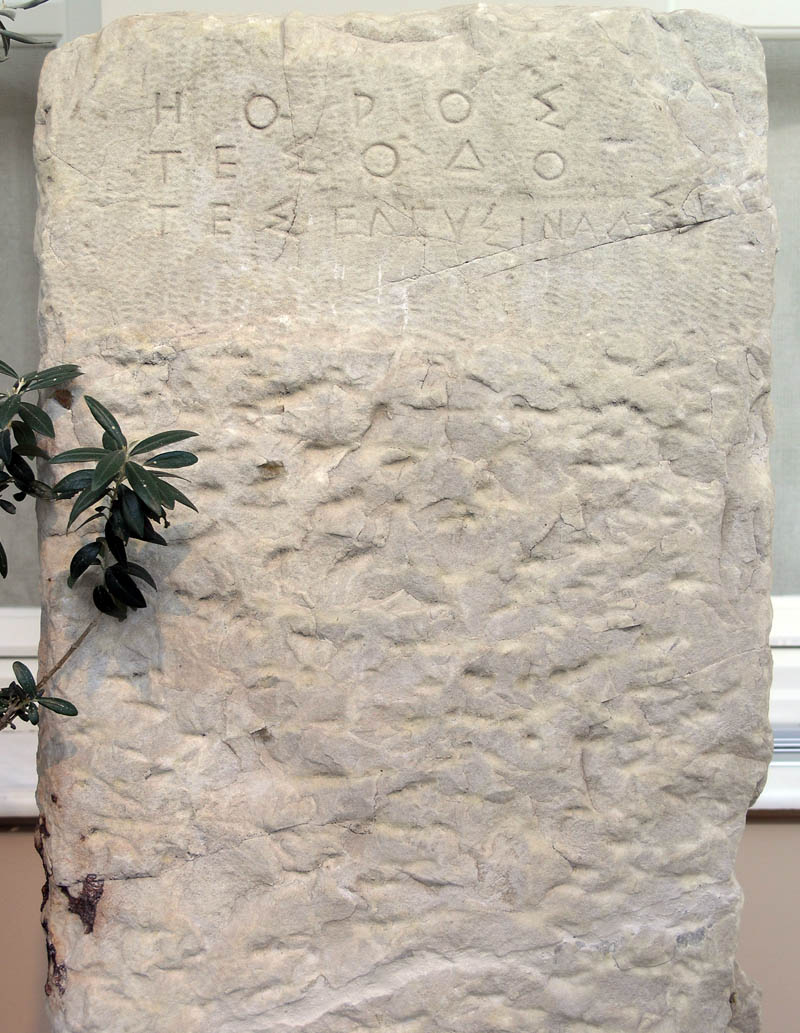
Boundary stone of the Sacred Way, ca. 520 BC

The Sacred Way (Ancient Greek: Ἱερὰ Ὁδός, Hierá Hodós), in ancient Greece, was the road from Athens to Eleusis. It was so called because it was the route taken by a procession celebrating the Eleusinian Mysteries. The procession to Eleusis began at the Sacred Gate in the Kerameikos (the Athenian cemetery) on the 19th Boedromion.

In the present day, the road from central Athens to Aegaleo and Chaidari (the old route to Eleusis) is called the Iera Odos after the ancient road.

== Mythos of Eleusis ==
The sacred rites of Demeter were performed in Eleusis in Ancient Greece beginning as far back as the 15th Century BCE, according to some sources. According to the Homeric Hymns of the Archaic period, Demeter stopped at Eleusis during her quest for Persephone. The story describes how Demeter, persuaded to stay at the palace of Eleusis by its prince, Celeus, was given the task of raising Celeus's son Demophon. When she is discovered to be a Goddess by the queen Metaneira after trying in vain to make Demophon immortal, she instructed the Eleusinians to build a temple for her. Upon later finding Persephone, she taught the leaders of Eleusis how to perform her rites.

Unlike many of the cults in the Ancient Greek world, the cult of Demeter kept its rites a secret except for a chosen few, thus warranting the name the Eleusinian Mysteries. While at first the cult of Demeter remained small, it eventually grew quite large after Eleusis was incorporated into Athens during the Archaic period. After some time, it drew crowds from thousands of people around Greece, and even leaders like Peisistratos, Pericles, Hadrian, and Antoninus Pius all came to erect monuments at Eleusis. In addition, the rites became so important to the Greeks that until Roman rule, the Sacred Way remained the only road in central Greece.

== Rites and procession ==
Although the cult of Demeter kept information about its rites a secret only to those in the cult, the cult itself was open to a wide array of people. Initiates could be young or old, male or female, even slave or free. The only requirement, it seems, is that initiates could not have any sort of un-atoned bloodguilt on their hands.

The process for initiates began six months before the procession along the Sacred Way. The initiation began at the beginning of spring with instruction on the Lesser Mysteries, which mostly celebrated the arrival of spring and allowed for initiates to atone themselves in preparation for the Greater Mysteries later on in the fall. After these preliminary steps, and one month before the procession in Boedromion, special messengers, called the spondophoroi, were sent out from Eleusis to herald the coming of the procession all around Greece. Finally, on the 13th of Boedromion, priestesses of Demeter and Persephone carried baskets of Sacred Objects, called the hiera, from Eleusis to Athens in preparation for the procession and the rites of the Greater Mysteries.

=== Sequence of events ===
On the first day of the celebration, initiates dressed in simple attire gathered with their teachers, as well as a large crowd, in the Agora in front of the Stoa Poikile for the proclamation by the hierophant of Demeter. The proclamation welcomed any initiate who was not morally corrupt, instructed initiates to not reveal the experiences of the rites, and told them that they must fast between sunup and sunrise during the celebration. The day then ended with a parade up to the sacred precinct of Demeter called the Eleusinion.

The second day started early with initiates walking with their teachers, families, and friends to submerge themselves in the Bay of Phaleron. This may have been seen as a physical and spiritual cleansing ceremony for the initiates.

The third day was a day for sacrifices and sacred offerings. Each initiate was tasked with sacrificing a suckling pig, while the officials of the ceremony sacrificed other animals for feasts later on in the day. There's a great deal of speculation as to the origins, reasons, and even practices during this day. Some suggest the blood of the suckling pig was sprinkled on the initiates for purification, while others suggest that sacrifices originally consisted of first fruits and grains, but were then discarded for animal sacrifices in protest against Athenian use of the first harvest for war taxes during the Peloponnesian War.

On the fourth day, the cults of Asclepius, God of Medicine, and Hygieia, Goddess of Health, joined the celebration in Athens. Sacrifices were then held in the evening at the Eleusinion and special blessings were called upon for doctors and healers. At night, initiates participated in what could have been described as a night watch and invited divine visitation to help focus on healing of physical ailments, emotional distress, or spiritual limitations. At the end of the night, they would tell their dreams to an attendant and follow their guidance on how to perform certain actions for healing to occur.

The fifth day, the 19th of Boedromion, was the day of the great procession along the Sacred Way from Athens to Eleusis. On this day, thousands of celebrants, led by the initiates and priests in front of them joined the Grand Procession beginning at the Sacred Gate. The procession was not a continuous affair, but involved multiple stops along the way. The first of these was at the shrine of the Sacred Son outside Athens, who would come and join the lead of the parade. They would then stop at the Cephissus River where kids in the procession would offer a lock of hair before moving on to the temple precinct at Daphni and the sanctuary of Aphrodite nearby. Finally, at the border between Athens and Eleusis, descendants of Krokos, the first settler of Eleusis, would meet the procession and tied yellow strands to the right wrists and left ankles of the initiates to signal Demeter.

Festivities on day six began in the evening with the Pannychis, a nightlong revelry where women with torches danced around the well of beautiful dances, known as the Kallichoron, in Eleusis. One of the celebrations, the kernophoria involved all of the celebrants, who were led by women dancing with kernos, a vessel on their head, filled with first fruits. Likely, a special bread was made from these goods as an offering to Demeter.

The seventh and eighth days remain the most mysterious in the process. The initiates and their teachers would enter into Demeter's temple in Eleusis for a ritual of what was known as things said (logomena), things enacted (dromena) and things seen (deiknymena), which were all part of the mystery. It is thought that this was the time when initiates acted out portions of the Mother and Daughter from the Homeric Hymns. It is also believed that this is when initiates received the epopteia, a sacred vision that was the highest stage of the initiation. Upon completion of this part of the initiation, those who had partaken went on to feel brighter hopes for the end of their lives and the rest of eternity. Finally, the initiates left the temple and walked to the Rarian Fields to invoke the rebirth of the crops.

The ninth and final day was the day initiates returned home. It was also the day for libations to be offered, it is unclear to whom. Some think that they were offered to the dead.
