= Olympia Odos =

Motorway in Greece

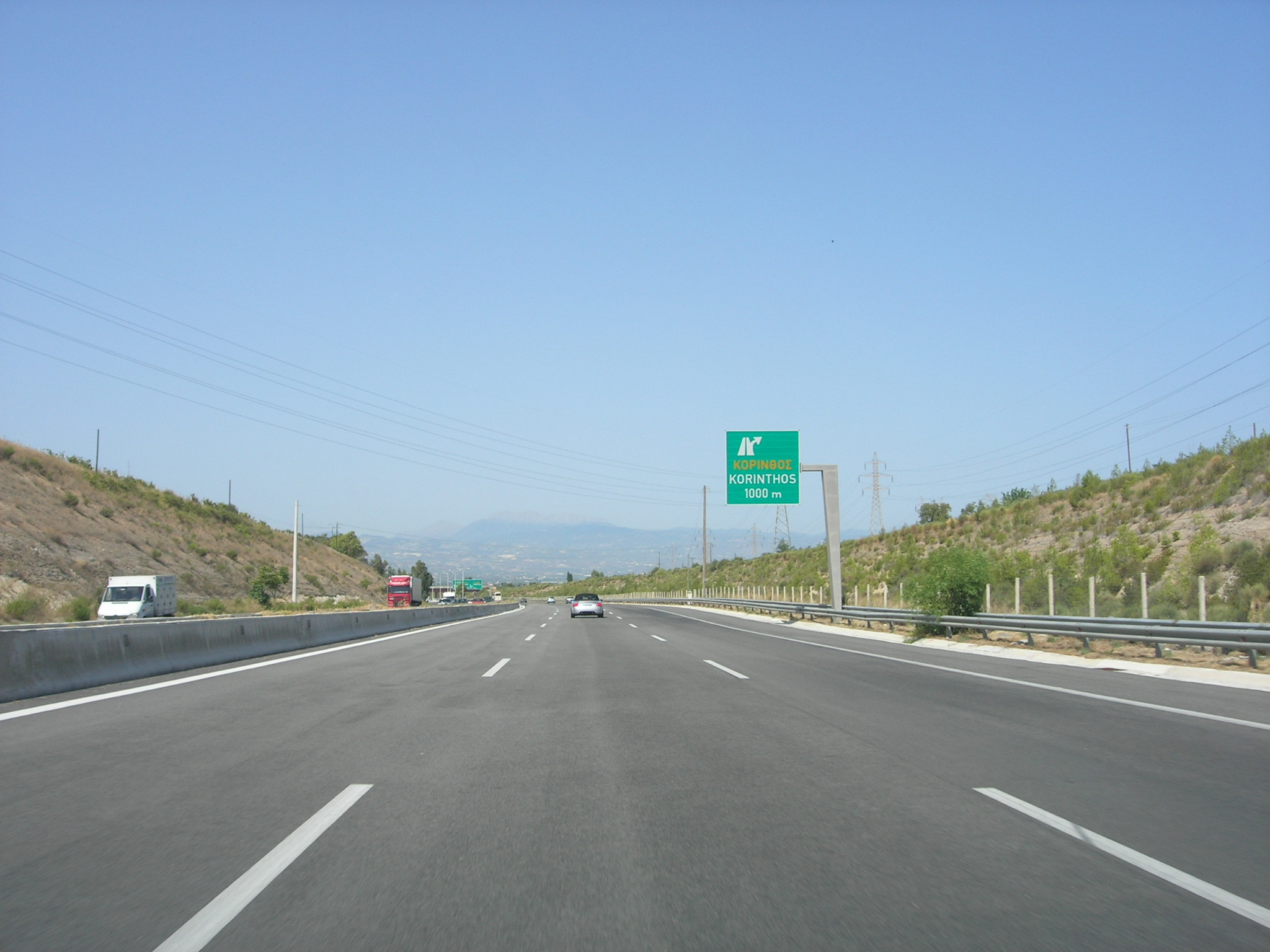
A8 motorway - Korinthos exit

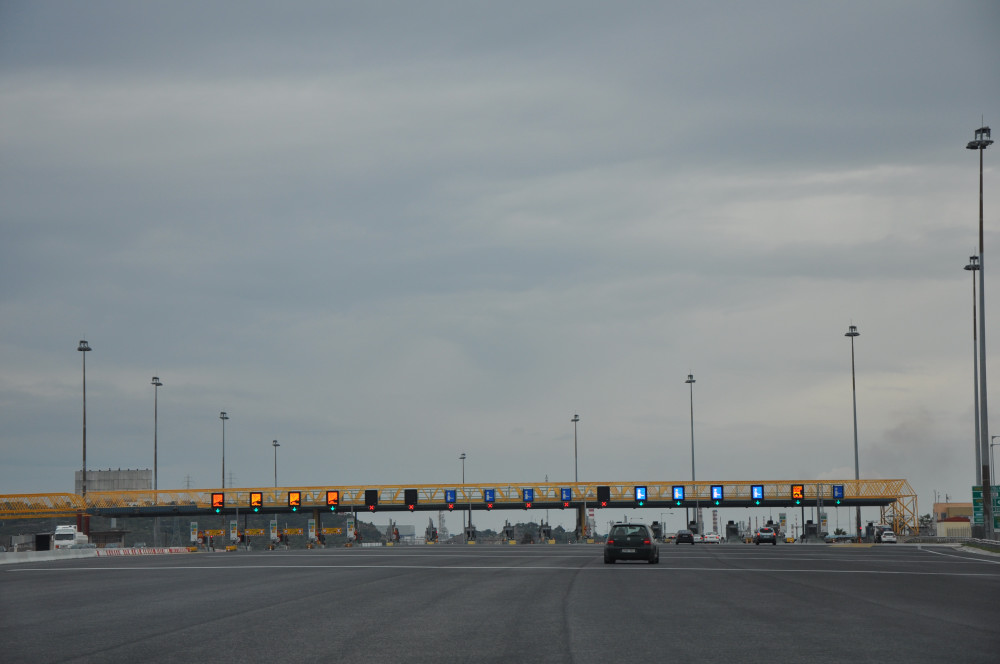
Isthmos toll gate

Olympia Odos is a toll motorway system on the Peloponnese in Greece. Starting from Eleusis in the Athens metropolitan area, the Olympia Odos motorways follow the Gulf of Corinth to the Rio–Antirrio bridge and the city of Patras, and along the Ionian Sea coastline, in future down to Tsakona (near Meligalas) in the southwestern Peloponnese where it will intersect with the A7 motorway.

Olympia Odos consists of two motorways:

- The A8 (Athens – Patras), constructed in 1962–1973 as National Road 8α. During the 1990s the Elefsina – Corinth section was upgraded to motorway standards. The Corinth – Patras upgrade to motorway standards was completed in April 2017.
- The southern part of the A5 (Patras – Pyrgos), which passes by the namesake ancient city of Olympia. This motorway is currently under construction.

The 210 km (130 mi) motorway is a toll-road linking Athens to Patras and, in the future, will extend a further 163 km to Tsakona in the south-west of the Peloponnese.

== History ==
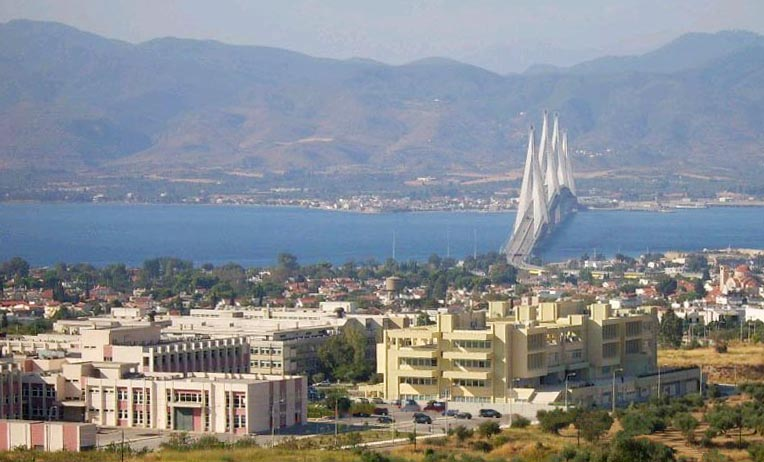
University of Patras with the Rio–Antirrio bridge in the background

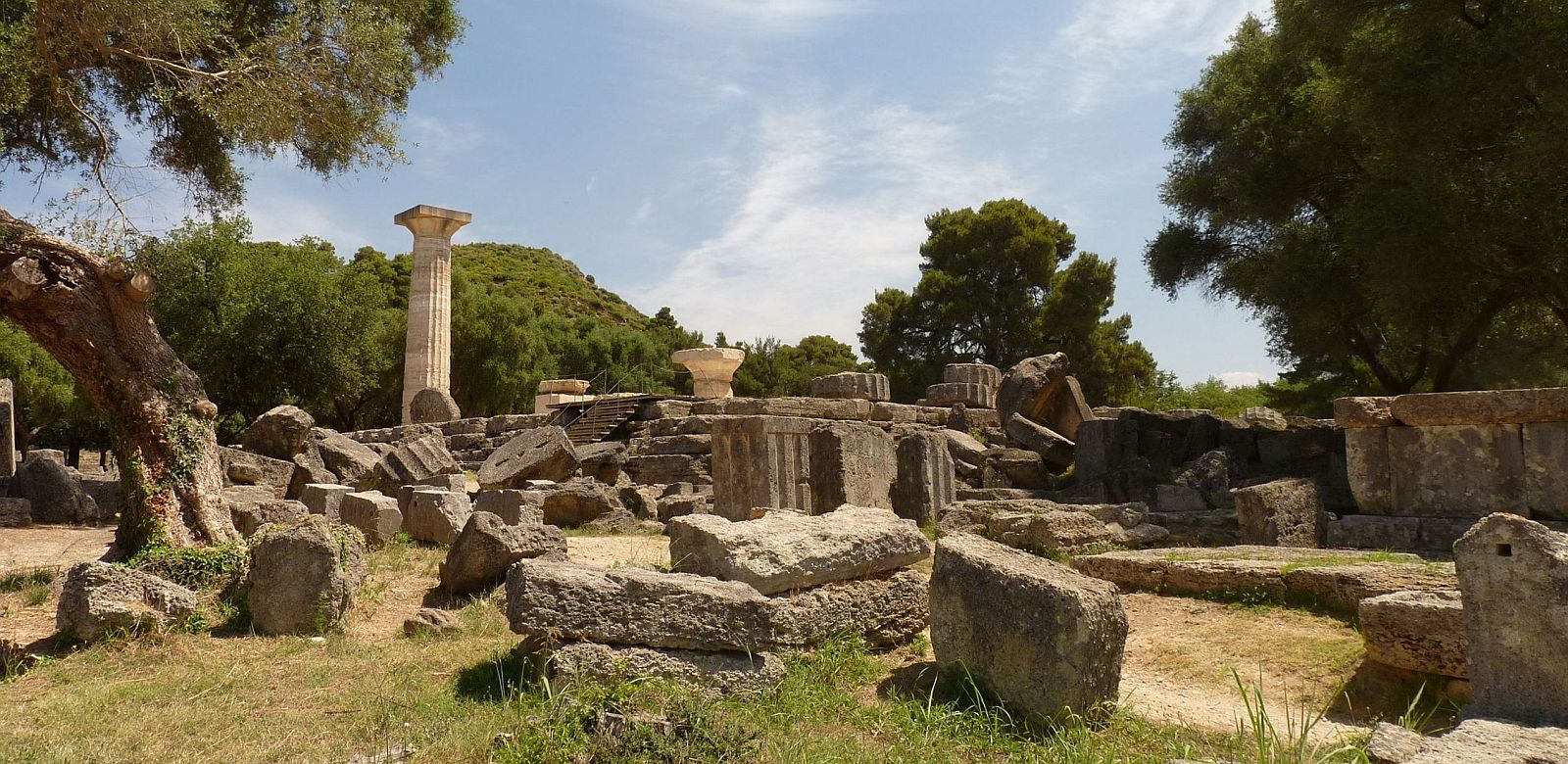
Temple of Zeus in ancient Olympia

On 4 August 2008 a public-private partnership deal came into effect with the Greek state conceding construction and 30 years of maintenance of the Olympia Odos motorway to the international Olympia Odos S.A. consortium. In return for the right to collect tolls, the consortium will invest a total of €2.8 billion for construction and modernization of the highway.

The upgrade of the A8 (Elefsina–Corinth–Rio) and the southern section of the A5 (Rio–Pyrgos–Tsakona) by Olympia Odos S.A. has been described as "the largest and most challenging project currently undertaken in Greece, and one of the most complex ones in Europe.". It also includes the construction of 19 km (12 mi) of tunnels and twenty interchanges.

Subsequently, 82 km (51 mi) preexisting dual carriageway of the Patras bypass and the National Road 8a section Elefsina–Corinth) were further upgraded to full motorway standards. 120 km (75 mi) of preexisting single carriageway in the Corinth – Patras section were doubled. 163 km (101 mi) of the southern A5 section (Patras–Pyrgos–Kalamata) will be newly constructed.

The project was expected to take six years to complete, with a completion date scheduled for the end of 2014. The Greek government-debt crisis however led to considerable delays. The overall progress of the project in April 2017 was at 95%.

== Olympia Odos consortium ==
The international consortium consists of:

- French-based motorway operator Vinci SA (29.9%)
- German-based construction company Hochtief (17%)
- Cyprus-based construction company Joannou & Paraskevaides (17%)
- Greece-based construction company GEK Terna (17%)
- Greece-based financial services company Aktor Concessions (17%)
- Greece-based company Athena S.A. (2.1%)
