= Kiato =

Kiato Κιάτο
- Community
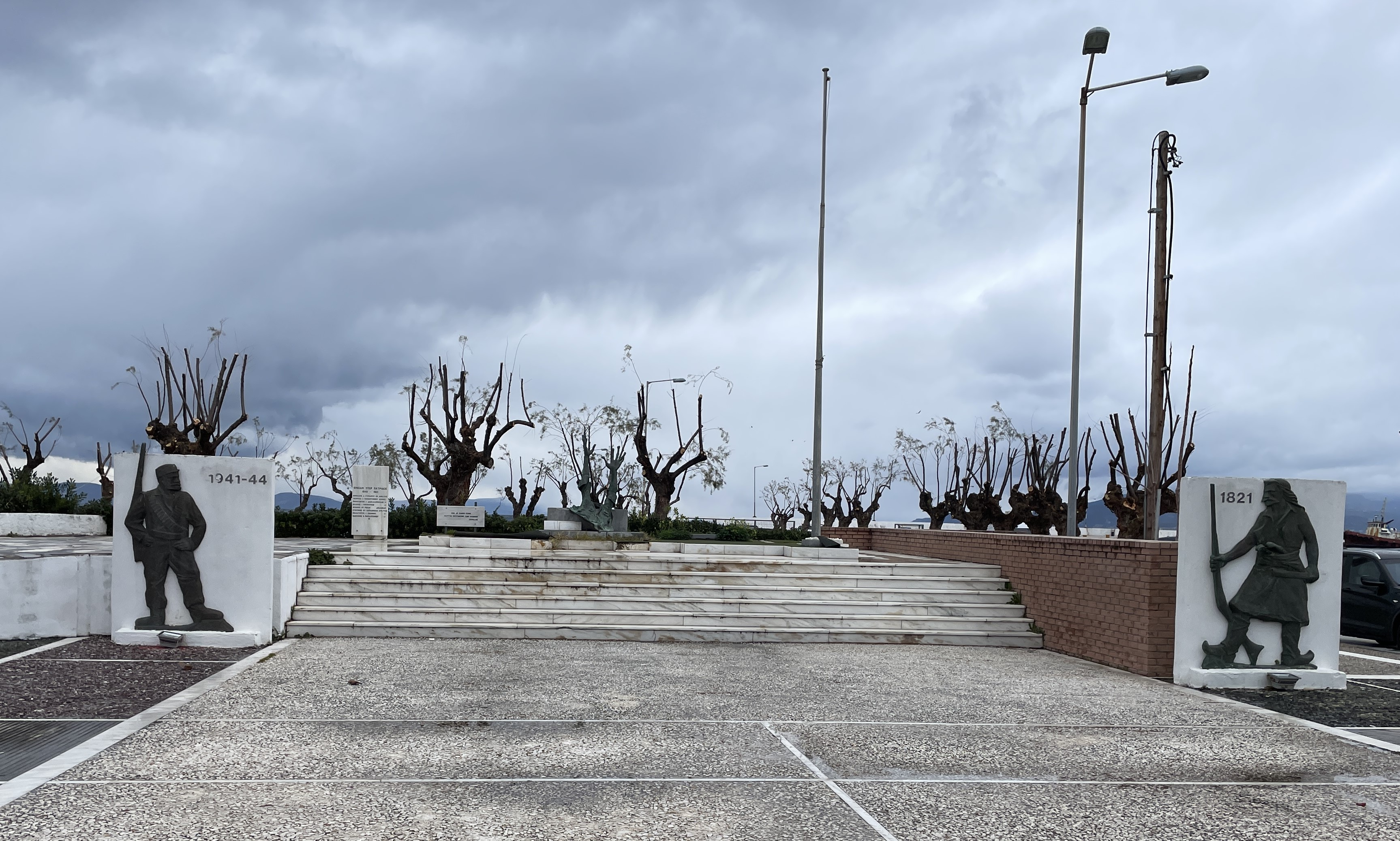
- War memorial

- Location within Greece
- Coordinates: 38°0.7′N 22°44.8′E
- Country: Greece
- Administrative region: Peloponnese
- Regional unit: Corinthia
- Municipality: Sikyona
- Municipal unit: Sikyona

Population (2021)
  - Community: 9,907
- Time zone: UTC+2 (EET)
  - Summer (DST): UTC+3 (EEST)
- Vehicle registration: ΚΡ

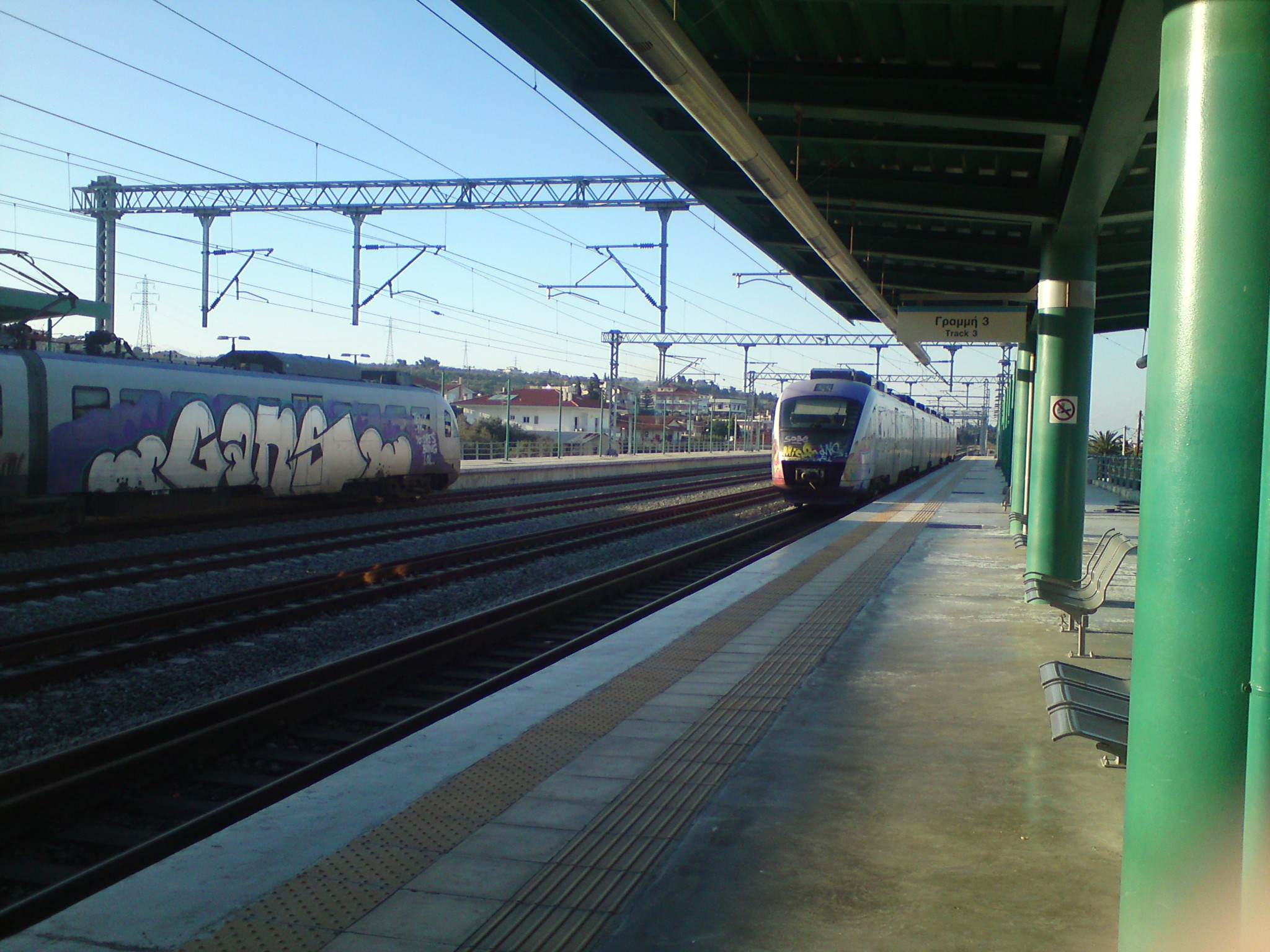
Kiato suburban railway station, with Direct services to Athens and Piraeus

Kiato (Greek: Κιάτο) is a town in the northern part of Corinthia in the Peloponnese, Greece. It is the seat of the municipality of Sikyona. Kiato is situated on the Gulf of Corinth, near the mouth of the river Asopos. It has much tourist activity mainly in the summer. The ancient city Sicyon was located 4 km southwest of present Kiato. Kiato is 4 km northwest of Velo, 13 km southeast of Xylokastro and 18 km northwest of Corinth. The Greek National Road 8A (Patras - Corinth - Athens) passes southwest of the town. It had a station on the now decommissioned Piraeus-Patras railway. The new Kiato railway station is an interchange station of Proastiakos (suburban railway) lines to Athens and to Aigio.

== Historical population ==
Year	Population
1981	8,232
1991	9,212
2001	9,655
2011	9,812
2021	9,907

== Notable people ==
- Emilios T. Harlaftis (1965–2005), astrophysicist
- Giannis Spanos (b. 1943-2019), composer
- Alexandros Alexandris (b. 1968), footballer

== See also ==
- List of settlements in Corinthia
