= Selinous =

Selinous or Selinountas may refer to:

== Communities ==
- Selinunte, an ancient Greek archaeological site on the south coast of Sicily
- Selinous (Laconia), a village in ancient Laconia
- Selinous (Sporades), a town of the ancient Sporades islands in Greece
- Selinountas, Achaea, a village near Aigio, Achaea, Greece
- Selinous, Arcadia, an ancient town near present Kosmas, Arcadia, Greece

== River ==
- Selinountas (river), a river in Achaea, Greece

== See also ==
- Selinus (disambiguation)
