= Selinus (disambiguation) =

Selinus (Latin for Selinunte) was a city of ancient Sicily.

Selinus may also refer to:

== Geography ==
- Selinus (Cilicia), a city of ancient Cilicia, in Asia Minor
- Selinus (Laconia), a village of ancient Laconia, Greece
- Selinus (Sporades), a town of the ancient Sporades islands in Greece
- Selinus, ancient name of the Selinountas river, Greece

== Biology ==
- Celery, an edible plant
- Celeriac, an edible plant

== Other uses ==
- Selinus (mythology), a figure in Greek mythology
- Battle of Selinus, fought near the city

== See also ==
- Selinous (disambiguation)
