= Temeni =

Temeni Τέμενη
- Community
- Location within Greece
- Coordinates: 38°14′N 22°7′E
- Country: Greece
- Administrative region: West Greece
- Regional unit: Achaea
- Municipality: Aigialeia
- Municipal unit: Aigio
- Elevation: 20 m (66 ft)

Population (2021)
  - Community: 1,213
- Time zone: UTC+2 (EET)
  - Summer (DST): UTC+3 (EEST)
- Postal code: 251 00
- Area code: 26940
- Vehicle registration: AX

Temeni (Greek: Τέμενη) is a coastal village in the Peloponnese region of southwest Greece. It is a traditional and highly productive agricultural community that balances local village charm with easy access to coastal beaches and nearby cities. It is situated between the river Selinountas and the Gulf of Corinth, 4 km (2.5 mi) southeast of Aigio town centre and 1 km (0.62 mi) west of Valimitika. The spring water Avra is manufactured near Temeni.

== Population ==
| Year | Population |
|---|---|
| 1981 | 1,113 |
| 1991 | 1,171 |
| 2001 | 1,137 |
| 2011 | 1,214 |
| 2021 | 1,213 |

== Economy & The "Avra" ConnectionAgriculture ==
The primary economic driver is agriculture. Thanks to the fertile coastal plain, the area is rich with olive groves, fruit orchards (especially citrus), vineyards, and vegetable farmlands.Famous Spring Water: Temeni is most famous throughout Greece as the home of Avra (Άυρα) spring water. The high-profile natural mineral water plant manufactures its product right near the village, tapping into the natural fresh springs flowing down from the mountain ranges behind Temeni.

== Tourism & Attractions ==
Temeni Beach (Paralia Temenis): Located roughly 800 meters from the village center, the local beach sits along the Gulf of Corinth. It is known for remarkably clear waters, pebble shores, and natural shade provided by almurikia (tamarisk) trees. It is largely unorganized and quiet, frequented heavily by locals rather than crowds of international tourists.Surrounding Highlights: Visitors frequently use Temeni as a quiet base to explore regional highlights such as the Vouraikos Gorge cog railway (starting in Diakopto), the mountain town of Kalavryta, and historic regional monasteries like Taxiarchon.

== See also ==
- List of settlements in Achaea
