= Konstantinos Gofas =

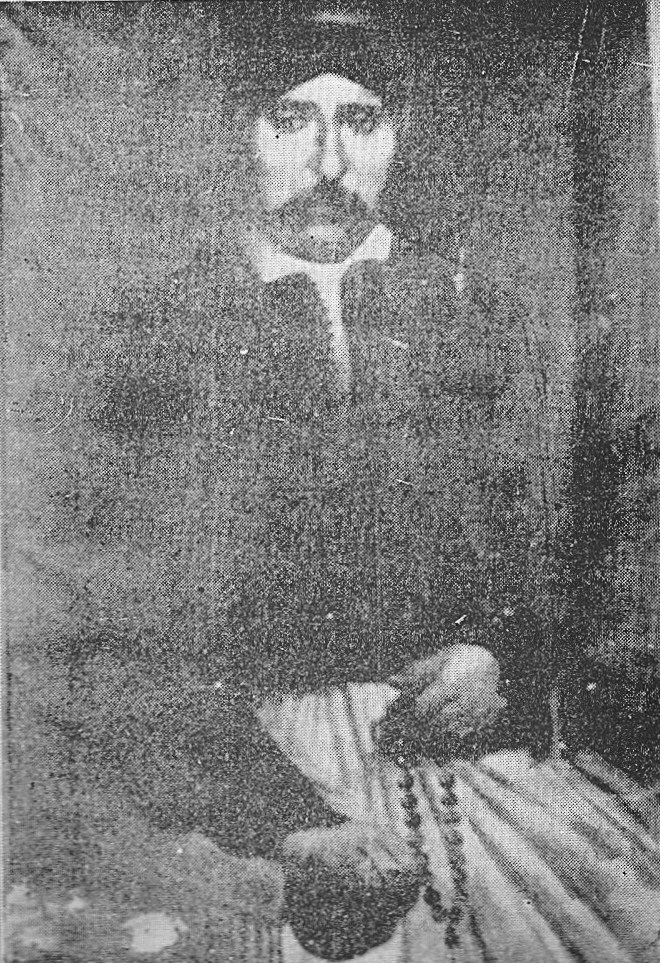
- A portrait of Gofas
- Native name: Κωνσταντίνος Γκόφας
- Born: c. 1790; Pteri, Morea Eyalet, Ottoman Empire (now Greece)
- Died: 1865 Kalavryta, Kingdom of Greece
- Allegiance: First Hellenic Republic; Kingdom of Greece
- Branch: Hellenic Army
- Conflicts: Greek War of Independence; Siege of Patras; Siege of Tripolitsa; Battle of Dervenakia; Battle of Doliana
- Children: Themistoklis; Michail; Panagos; Spyridon; Vasileios; Leonidas

Konstantinos Gofas (Greek: Κωνσταντίνος Γκόφας, c. 1790 - 1865) was a Greek revolutionary leader and a soldier during the Greek War of Independence and a politician.

He was born in Pteri south of Aigio and was the brother of Christos Gofas. He worked with the Petmezades and founded to preserve one of them from the Turks during the robbery of 1806. During the start of the Greek War of Independence in 1821, he participated with Dimitrios Meletopoulos and battled several battles in the Peloponnese. He took part in the Sieges of Patras, Corinth, Tripoli and the battles of Akrata, Dervenakia, Messenia, Battle of Doliana and on August 8, 1827, in Kafkaria. He discriminated from the family in which he was injured twice, in the battles of Dervenaki in 1825 and Krommydi in 1827 near Pylia.

Under the deeds of those, he was awarded the Silver Aristeio. Uses under the actions for the revolution was addressed in under the service of the Revolutionary Commission and with the claim on March 27, 1865, which he when he did not took part in any rewards for the deeds, that much and the rejection of his father. Dimitrios Gofas as an officer paid for the salary and the supplying of soldiers. In the claim which happened by the truch from 1804 by Dimitrios Meletopoulos in which marked the services as long as Gkoufas and as long as his father, acquiescence in all of that space... known and the edge of subjection on its in the battles. In which he from the total land from the newly formed Greek Government. From 1826, he was elected only in Pteri and entered the common important spot between the superior of the city.

He had six sons, Themistoklis, a landowner who died early, Michail Gofas, a trader which finance for forty years and the first council president, Panagos Gofas for many years, Greek consul to Tbilisi and in Batumi along with Spyridon, Vasileios and Leonidas Gofas in which survives many relatives.
