= Leontium (Achaea) =

Coordinates: 38°01′49″N 21°54′47″E

Leontium or Leontion (Ancient Greek: Λεόντιον) was a town and polis (city-state) of ancient Achaea. It was not originally one of the twelve Achaean cities, though it afterwards became so, succeeding to the place of Rhypes. It is only mentioned by Polybius, but implied to be an inland town, and was probably between Pharae and the territory of Aegium, since we find that the Eleians under the Aetolian general Euripidas, after marching through the territory of Pharae as far as that of Aegium, retreated to Leontium. During the Social War, nearby was fought the Battle of Leontion (217 BCE).

Map of ancient Achaea (with place names in Greek)

The site of Leontium is located at Kastritsi, Kato Vlasia, in the municipal unit of Leontio.
