= Battle of the Trench (disambiguation) =

The Battle of the Trench was fought in Medina in 627 between Muslims and Arab-Jewish tribes.

Battle of the Trench may also refer to:

== Battles ==
- Battle of Leontion (c. 217 BCE)
- Battle of the Great Foss (7th-century BCE)
- Battle of the Trench (1821)

== Other uses ==
- Trench warfare, land military strategical warfare
