= Mavriki =

Mavriki Μαυρίκι
- Community
- Location within Greece
- Coordinates: 38°12′N 22°04′E
- Country: Greece
- Administrative region: West Greece
- Regional unit: Achaea
- Municipality: Aigialeia
- Municipal unit: Aigio

Population (2021)
  - Community: 359
- Time zone: UTC+2 (EET)
  - Summer (DST): UTC+3 (EEST)

Mavriki (Greek: Μαυρίκι) is a community in the municipal unit of Aigio, Achaea, Greece. It consists of the villages Kato Mavriki, Ano Mavriki and Agios Ioannis. It is located on the left bank of the river Selinountas, 5 km south of Aigio. Mavriki suffered damage from the 2007 Greek forest fires.

== Population ==
Year	Population
1981	608
1991	517
2001	504
2011	403
2021	359

== See also ==
- List of settlements in Achaea
