= Melissia, Achaea =

Melissia Μελίσσια
- Community
- Location within Greece
- Coordinates: 38°11′N 22°04′E
- Country: Greece
- Administrative region: West Greece
- Regional unit: Achaea
- Municipality: Aigialeia
- Municipal unit: Aigio

Population (2021)
  - Community: 273
- Time zone: UTC+2 (EET)
  - Summer (DST): UTC+3 (EEST)

Melissia (Greek: Μελίσσια meaning honeycombs) is a village and a community in Achaea, Greece, part of the municipal unit of Aigio. It is located 8 km south of Aigio, near the right bank of the river Selinountas. The community includes the villages Lakka and Pyrgaki. Melissia suffered damage from the July 2007 forest fires.

== Population ==
Year	Population	Community population
1981	492	-
1991	427	-
2001	358	427
2011	317	343
2021	257	273

== See also ==
- List of settlements in Achaea
