= Paraskevi, Achaea =

Paraskevi Παρασκευή
- Community
- Location within Greece
- Coordinates: 38°11′N 21°59′E
- Country: Greece
- Administrative region: West Greece
- Regional unit: Achaea
- Municipality: Aigialeia
- Municipal unit: Aigio

Population (2021)
  - Community: 180
- Time zone: UTC+2 (EET)
  - Summer (DST): UTC+3 (EEST)

Paraskevi (Greek: Παρασκευή) is a village in the municipal unit of Aigio, Achaea, Greece. It is located in a hilly area, 3 km west of Kounina and 11 km southwest of Aigio. It was severely damaged by the 2007 Greek forest fires.

== Population ==
Year	Population
1981	282
1991	306
2001	230
2011	251
2021	180

== See also ==
- List of settlements in Achaea
