= Greek National Road 31 =

Trunk road in Greece

Coordinates: 38.1225°N 22.0542°E

National Road 31
- Εθνική Οδός 31
- Route of the EO31 road, in blue

Route information
- Length: 50.2 km (31.2 mi)
- Existed: 9 July 1963–present

Major junctions
- North end: Aigio
- South end: Kalavryta

Location
- Country: Greece
- Regions: Western Greece
- Primary destinations: Aigio; Pteri; Kalavryta

Highway system
- Highways in Greece; Motorways; National roads
← EO30	→ EO33

Greek National Road 31 (Greek: Εθνική Οδός 31), abbreviated as the EO31, is a national road in the Peloponnesian part of Western Greece. The EO31 runs between the towns of Aigio and Kalavryta.

== Route ==
The EO31 is officially defined as a north–south road located entirely in the Achaea regional unit, running between Aigio in the north and Kalavryta in the south, via Pteri: the road connects with the EO8 at Aigio, which leads to the A8 motorway.

== History ==
Ministerial Decision G25871 of 9 July 1963 created the EO31 from the old EO55, which existed by royal decree from 1955 until 1963, and followed the same route as the current EO31.
