= Aigio =

Town in Achaea, Greece

Aigio Αίγιο
- Municipal unit
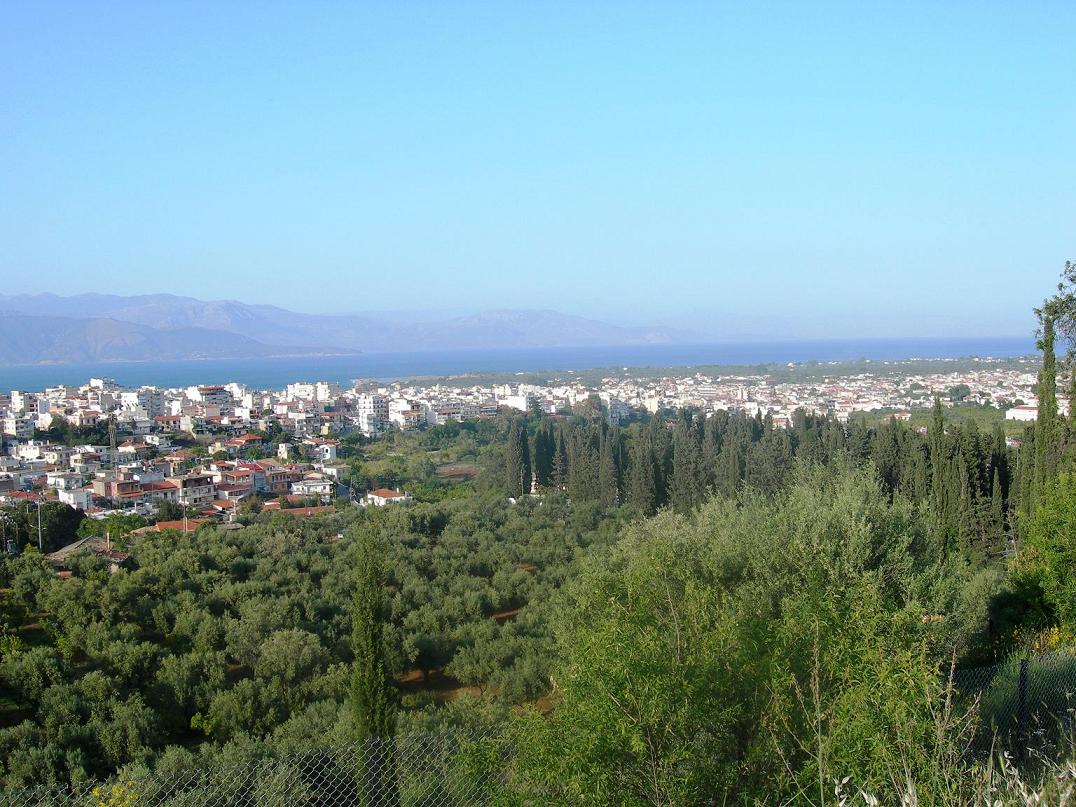
- The town of Aigio

- Location within the regional unit

- Location within Greece
- Coordinates: 38°15′02″N 22°04′52″E
- Country: Greece
- Geographic region: Peloponnese
- Administrative region: West Greece
- Regional unit: Achaea
- Municipality: Aigialeia

Area
  - Municipal unit: 151.101 km^{2} (58.340 sq mi)
- Elevation: 61 m (200 ft)

Population (2021)
  - Municipal unit: 25,795
  - Municipal unit density: 170.71/km^{2} (442.15/sq mi)
  - Community: 20,249
- Time zone: UTC+2 (EET)
  - Summer (DST): UTC+3 (EEST)
- Postal code: 251 00
- Area code: 2691
- Vehicle registration: ΑΧ, AZ
- Website: www.aigialeia.gov.gr www.aigio.gr

Aigio (Note: It is also written as Aeghion, Aegion, Aegio, or Egio.) (Greek: Αίγιο, romanized: Aígio, pronounced [ˈeʝio]; Latin: Aegium), is a town and a former municipality in Achaea, West Greece, on the Peloponnese. Since the 2011 local government reform, it is part of the municipality Aigialeia, of which it is the seat and a municipal unit.

Aigio is the second largest city in Achaea after Patras. The municipal unit has an area of 151.101 km^{2} and a population of around 26,000, while the municipality has about 49,000 inhabitants. Aigio is a port town on the Gulf of Corinth, and takes its name from the ancient city of Aegium.

== Geography ==
The southwestern part of the municipality consists of the foothills of Panachaiko mountain. The river Selinountas flows into the Gulf of Corinth in Valimitika, 5 km east of Aigio town centre.

== History ==
=== Antiquity ===
Before the founding of the city, the area had a Neolithic settlement. The city of Aigion was founded during Homeric times and became part of the first Achaean League since around 800 BC. The city had several Olympic winners, including Xenophon, Ladas (stadion race), Athenodorus (Αθηνόδωρος, stadion race), Straton (Στράτων, pancration and wrestling).

After the disaster of Helike, which was destroyed by an earthquake and buried by a tsunami in 373 BC, Aigion took the territory of the neighbouring city. The ruins of Helike were discovered in 2000 off the coast in the Corinthian Gulf. They are sometimes associated with Plato's Atlantis myth. Archeologists are excavating the site.

From 330 BC, Aigion was for fifty years under the Kingdom of Macedon. Around the year 275 BC, the people expelled the Macedonian garrison and the city joined the new Achaean League. With the famous temple of Zeus Homarios, Aigion became the Achaean assembly place. It remained their capital until the Roman conquest in 146 BC. After the annexation of Achaia, the Romans removed the wall of the city and Aegium lost its importance.

=== Byzantine era ===
After the division of the Roman Empire in 395 AD, Aegium became a part of the Eastern Roman Empire and later the Byzantine Empire. In 805 it was captured by Slavic tribes during the Slavic invasions. Probably between 9th and 13th century it was renamed to Vostitsa (Βοστίτσα). In the Chronicle of the Morea (14th century), it is first mentioned with this new name. During the following centuries, the name is found in various documents having different spelling forms such as Bostizza, Ligustizza, Bostitza, Bostiza, Vostizza.

Some scholars interpret the name as having a Slavic origin. The German linguist and Slavicist Max Vasmer gives two possible interpretations, one from the word *Voščica (cf. Serbo-Croatian Voščíca [sic] and Voštane, and Slovenian Vošče) and one from the Church Slavonic word ovoštь, meaning "fruit". Dionysios Zakythinos, a Greek scholar of Byzantium, gives a similar interpretation, explaining the name as meaning "fruit-bearing place".

Christos Coryllos, in his detailed "Description of Greece", had given another interpretation. He writes that after the plague epidemic, numerous Avar or Slav shepherds migrated to this area. One of their leaders had the name "Vostitzas", from whom the town later took its name.

19th-century German writer Joseph Baron Ow, in his book Die Abstammung der Griechen und die Irrthümer und Täuschungen des Dr. Ph. Fallmerayer, written in 1846, gives a completely different interpretation. He writes that the name Bostiza is a diminutive form (typical in Greek language) of the word Bosta, which comes from the French word Bastion (middle French Bastillon). From Βosta was derived the word Bostan/Bostani, which is common in the Greek and Turkish languages, and means garden (other linguists believe that Bosta is of Persian origin).

=== Frankish and Ottoman era ===
The city was captured by the Crusaders in the early 13th century and became the seat of a barony of the Principality of Achaea. In the early 15th century, it was conquered by the Despotate of the Morea.

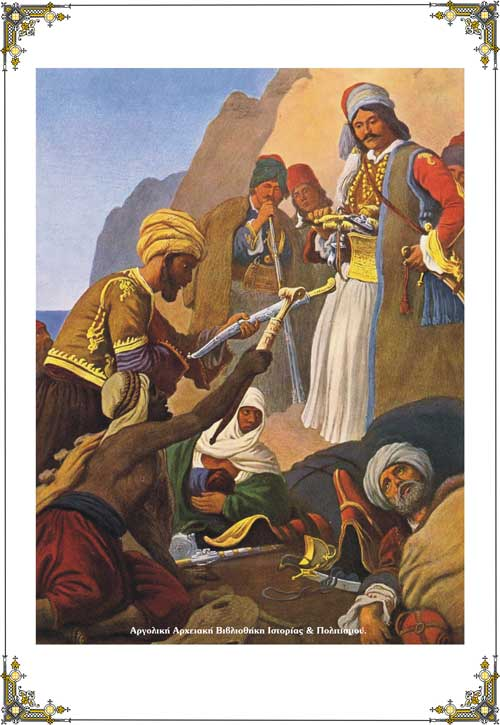
Andreas Londos destroys 3000 enemies near Vostizza, by Peter von Hess.

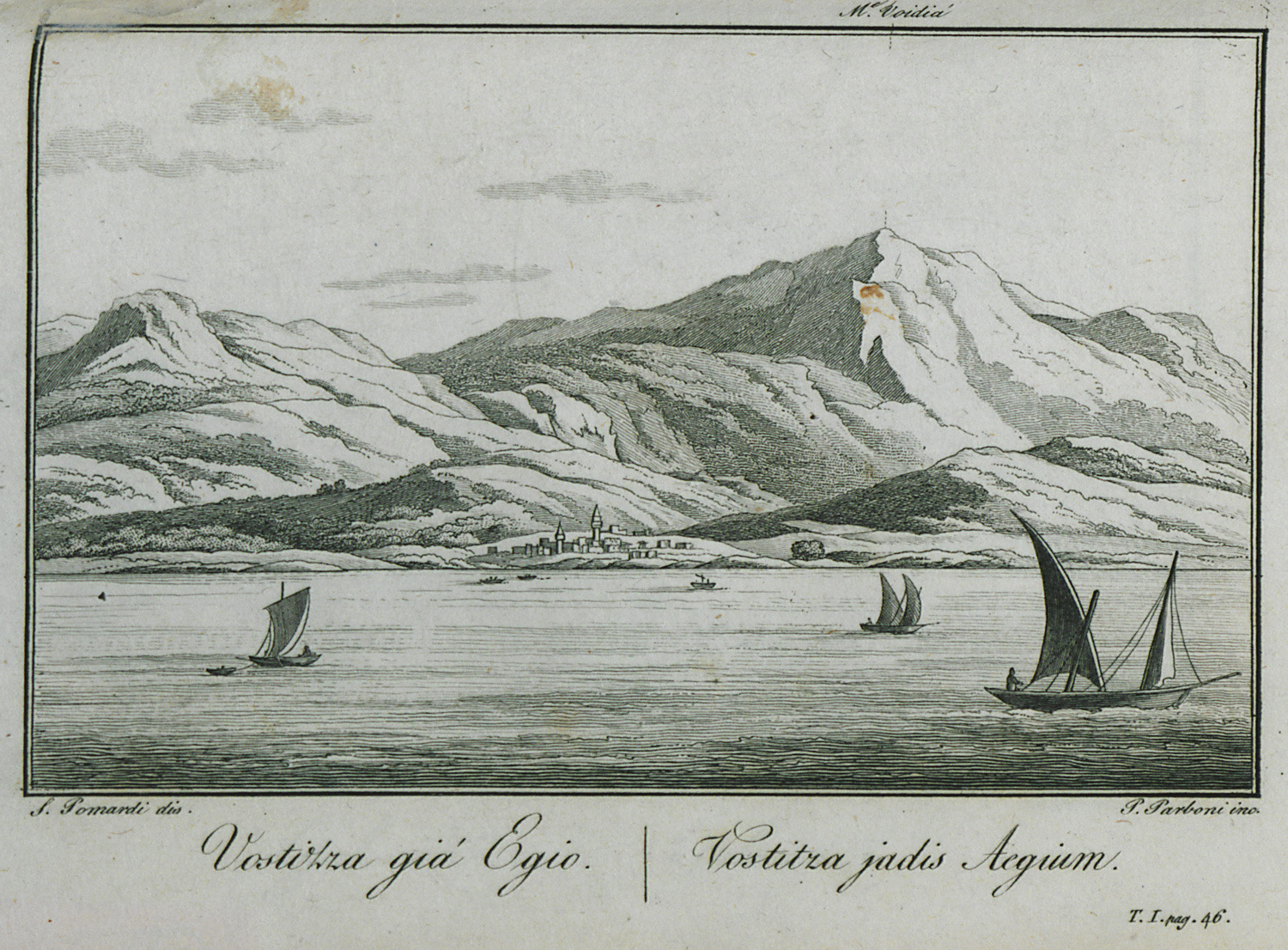
Vostizza, formerly Egio/Aegium, 1820 illustration by Simone Pomardi

In 1459 it was conquered by the Ottoman Empire, which ruled it until the outbreak of the Greek War of Independence, except for brief interruptions by the Venetians from 1463 until 1470, and from 1685 until 1715. The city was captured by Greek rebels on 26 March 1821, and was one of the first towns to be liberated from Ottoman rule.

In July 1822, at Akrata, near the town, a force of Greek fighters under Londos, Zaimis and Petimezas surrounded and attacked a group of 4000 Turks marching to Patras, after their defeat at the Battle of Dervenakia. Only a few Turks were lucky to escape when Yusuf Pasha sent ships to take them to Patras.

After Greek Independence, the town was officially renamed to its ancient name.

=== Modern era ===
Aigio grew rapidly after the population exchange between Greece and Turkey in 1923 with the arrival of refugees who permanently settled there. By the 1928 census, nearly one out of six of the town's residents was a refugee. This resulted in the creation of refugee neighbourhoods, most notably Nikolaos Plastiras.

On June 15, 1995, a serious earthquake destroyed many buildings and damaged roads in the downtown and southwestern sections, with a number of casualties. The earthquake shattered Aigio: small memorials are found throughout the city, with candles aglow day and night to remember the victims.

With drought heightening risk, the mountainous countryside near Aigio was severely damaged by the 2007 Greek forest fires. Climate change has increased temperature extremes and other fires have broken out in years since.

== Landmarks and sights ==
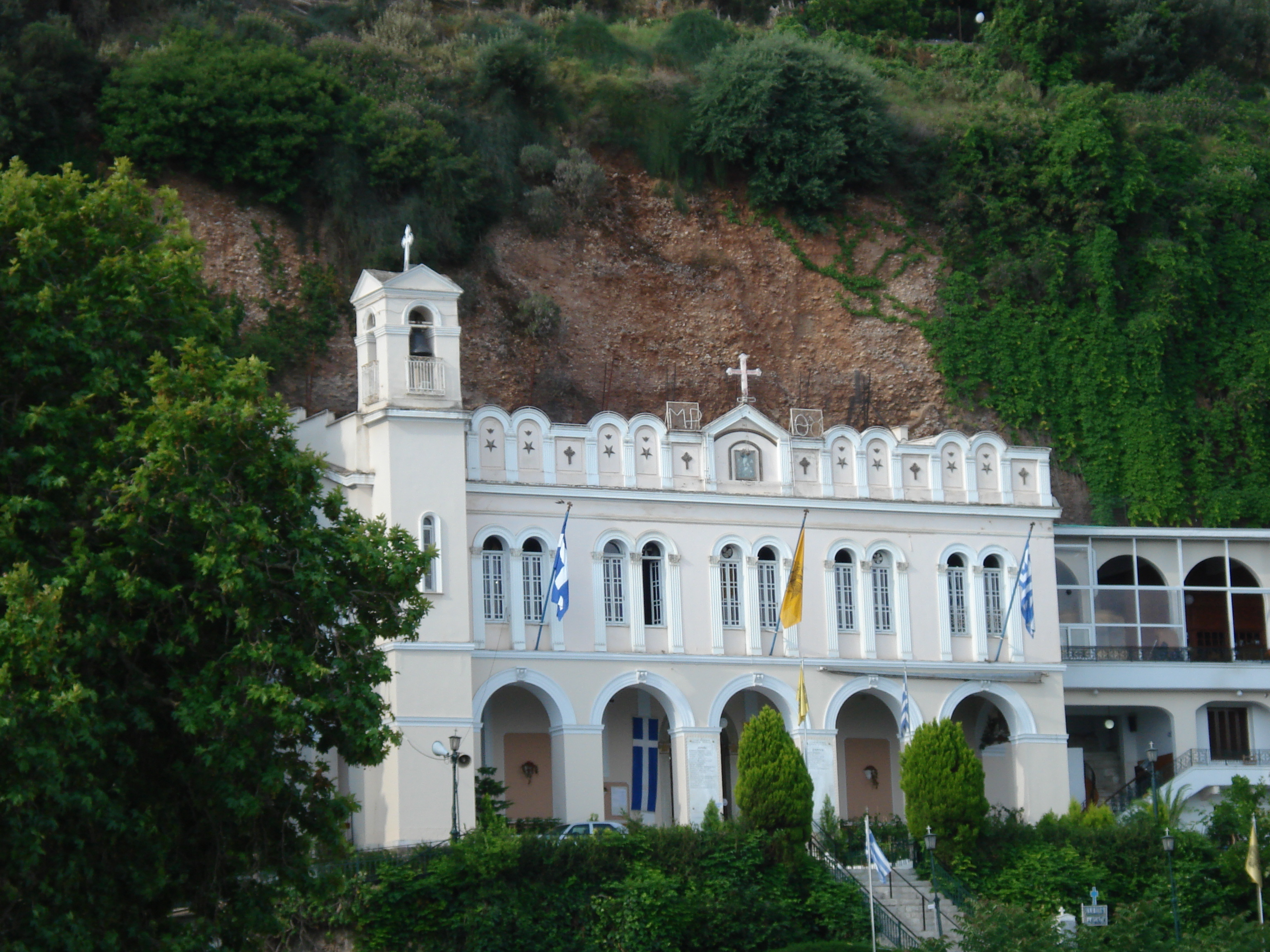
The sacred shrine of Panagia Trypiti.

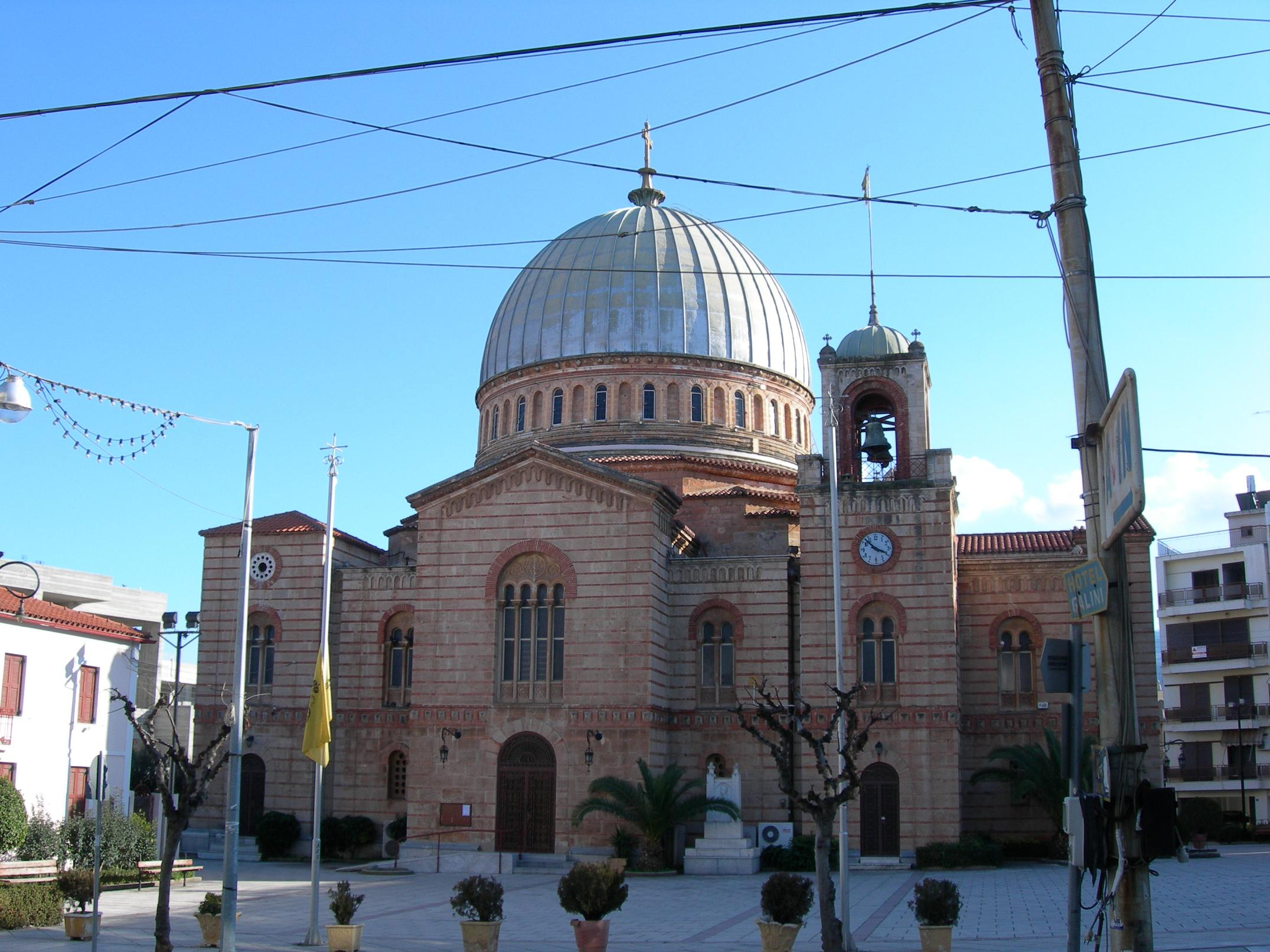
Faneromeni church, designed by Ernst Ziller.

- The church of Panagia Tripiti is a notable attraction. It is a national sacred shrine dedicated to the Theotokos, God-bearer or Mother of God, the Life Giving Spring. It is built on a steep cliff almost 30 meters high, near to sea, in a landscape full of cypresses and pine trees.
- The church of Panagia Faneromeni (inaugurated in 1914), which is the cathedral of Aigio, is the work of Saxon-Greek architect Ernst Ziller. The interior is decorated with paintings of Constantine Fanelis.
- The Archaeological Museum of Aigio is housed in the former municipal market of Aigio. It also was designed by architect Ernst Ziller and was built in 1890.
- Ypsila Alonia Square, the central square of the town. In the square there is the neogothic Tower of Ypsila Alonia, which now houses a cafeteria
- The beach promenade
- Plateia Agias Lavras is also a square in the centre of the town, and is lined with neoclassical houses and shops

== Transport ==
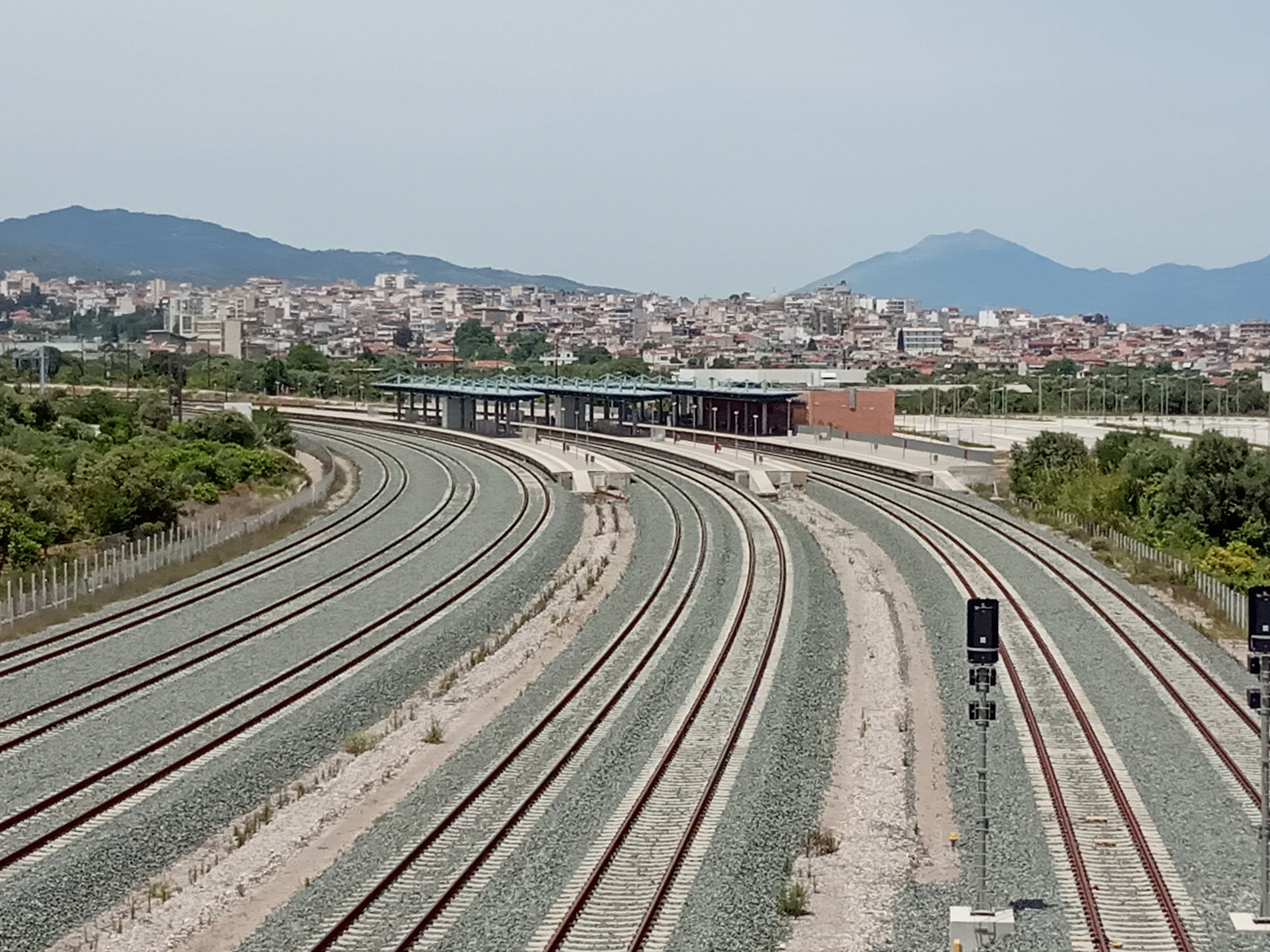
View of the new railway station of Aigion and the works of laying the railway tracks

Until May 2011, a ferry served the port of Aigio, connecting it to the north-eastern mainland city of Agios Nikolaos (not to be confused with the Cretan city of the same name). The ferry service was limited, with three ferries daily. The trip was 45 minutes long. In May 2011, the shipping company that operated the ferry announced that it was suspending the ferry because of financial reasons. In 2019 plans for an electric ferry were announced.

The port also has railroad tracks, but the Hellenic Railways Organisation (OSE) announced suspension of service in Aigio and across the Peloponnese in January 2011.

As of 2020, a new double standard-gauge railway line connects Aigio with Kiato and Athens. The new Aigio railway station was built at the east outskirts of the city. It opened in 22 June 2020, and a few days later it was inaugurated by the minister of transportation of Greece.

Roads serving the city are the A8 motorway (Athens–Patras) and EO31 (Aigio–Kalavryta).

== Infrastructure and economy ==
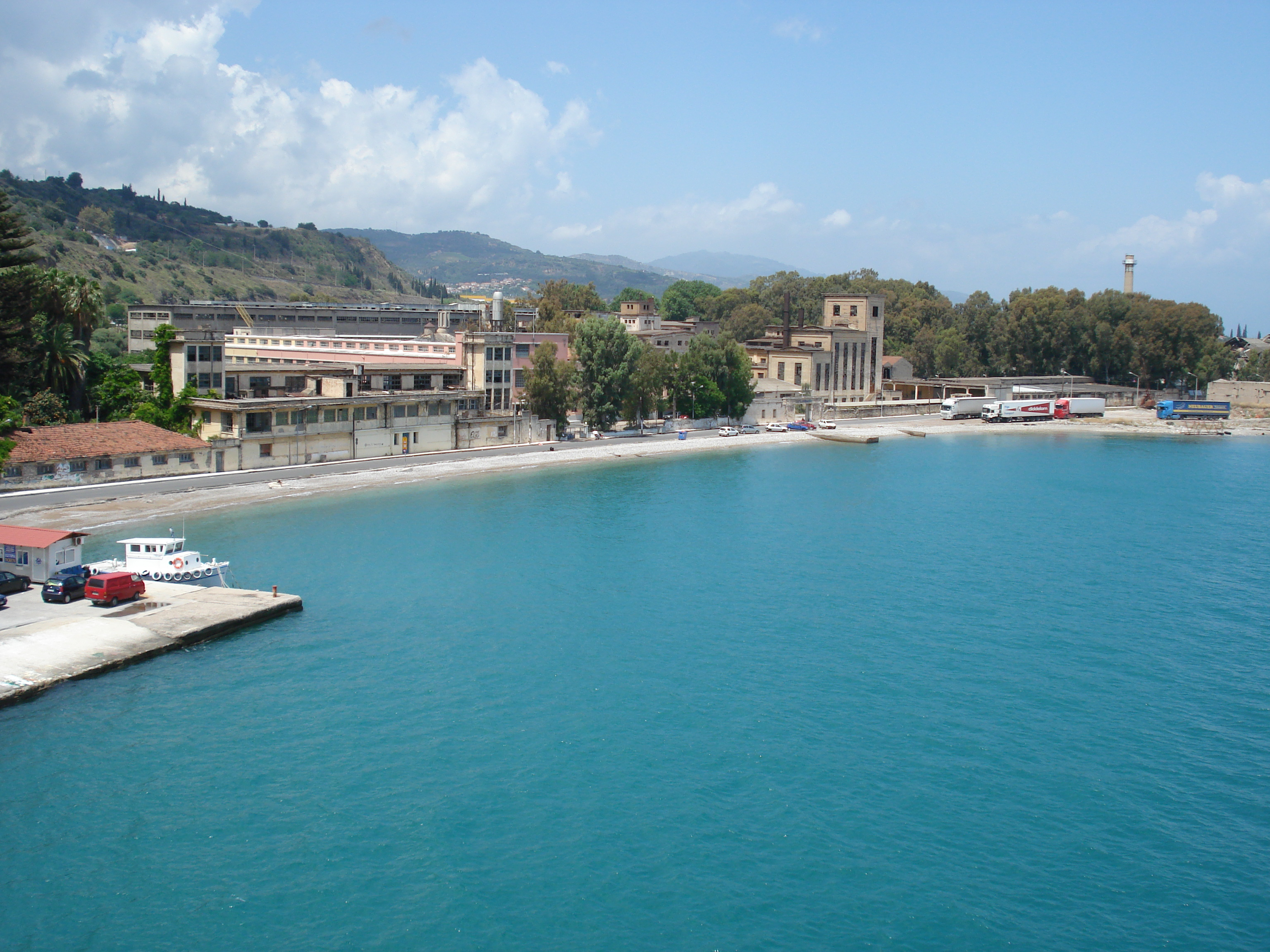
Port of Aigio, old pier

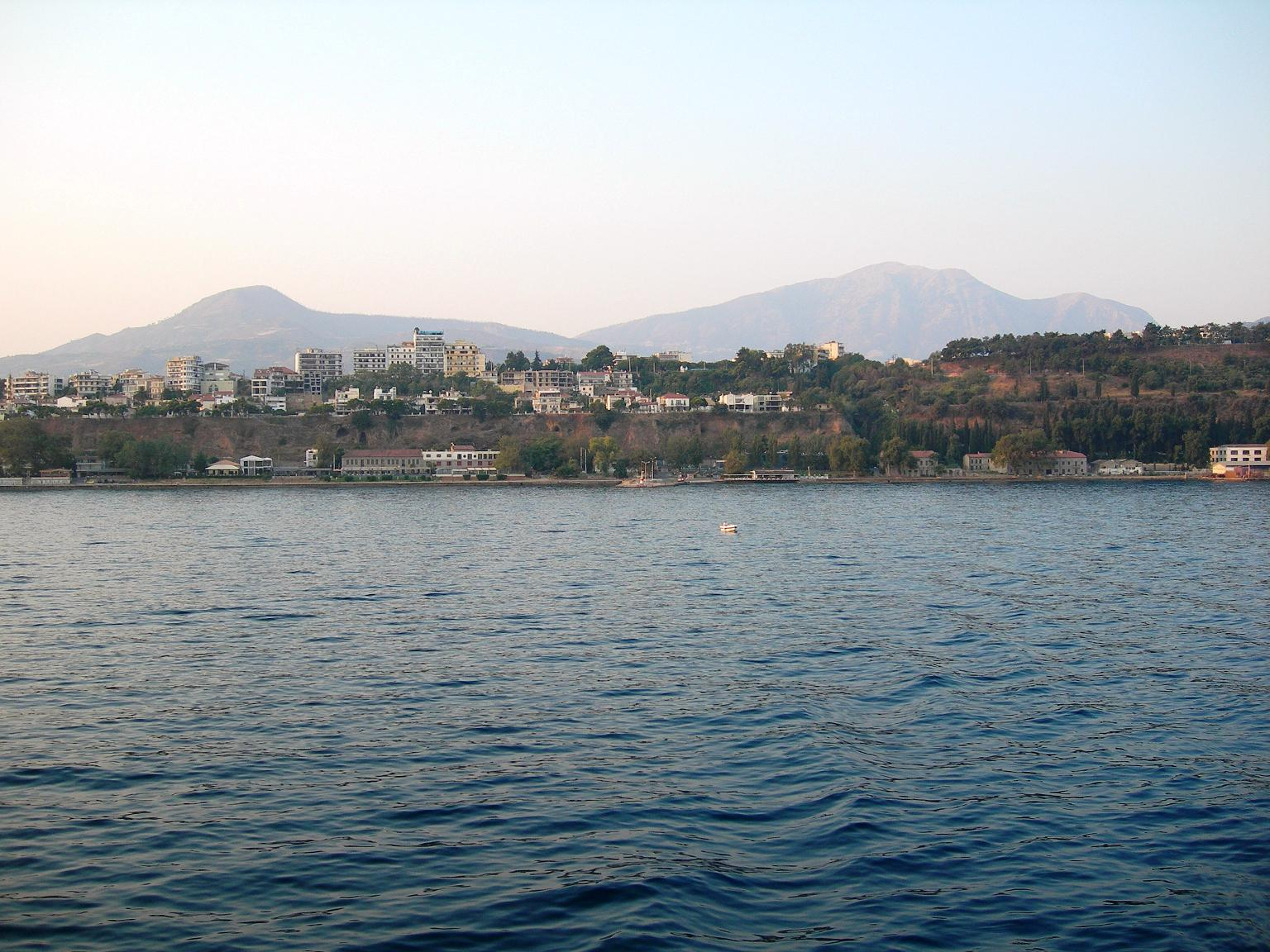
View from the sea

Aigio, along with Patras and Piraeus, has been one of the main export hubs for Corinthian raisins since the 19th century. In the book Geography of Greece - Achaia (1903) by Christos Coryllos, it is mentioned that the area of Aigio produced 7.5-10 million Kgs of raisins and 600 thousand kgs of olive oil annually. Today the port is used as a fruit import hub for Chiquita Brands International, mainly for the importation of bananas.

A new 256 m-long pier northwest of the existing port was inaugurated on 7 August 2013. The whole project cost 8.6 million Euros and is intended to enhance trade and tourism opportunities for the city.

Aigio houses two branch departments of the Technological Educational Institute of Patras, the department of Physiotherapy and the Optics and Optometry department. The Aigio General Hospital is situated a few kilometres out of the town and has a capacity of 100 beds. The Hospital performs the greatest number of laparoscopic surgeries in Greece, while more than 50,000 people are examined on a yearly basis.

== Sports ==
The most important sports and football club of Aigio, as well as the wider region, is Panegialios. Aigio has a football stadium called "Municipal Stadium of Aigion", which has a capacity of ~7,000 (4,500 seats). It was built in 1951 and was last renovated in 1999. For many years Aigio lacked basic facilities for water sports such as swimming or water polo. A new outdoor swimming pool was completed in January 2018.

== Subdivisions ==
The municipal unit Aigio is subdivided into the following communities (constituent villages in brackets):

- Aigio (Aigio, Agios Nikolaos, Sotir, Foniskaria)
- Chatzis
- Dafnes
- Digeliotika
- Kouloura
- Koumari
- Kounina (Kounina, Agia Anna, Pelekistra, Petrovouni)
- Mavriki (Ano Mavriki, Agios Ioannis, Kato Mavriki)
- Melissia (Melissia, Lakka, Pyrgaki)
- Paraskevi
- Pteri (Pteri, Achladea, Agios Andreas, Agios Panteleimonas, Boufouskia, Kato Pteri)
- Selinounta
- Temeni
- Valimitika

== Historical population ==
Year	Municipal district	Municipality
1981	20,955	-
1991	22,178	28,903
2001	21,255	27,741
2011	20,664	26,523
2021	20,249	25,795

== Mayors ==
- Anastasios Lontos
- Dimitrios Meletopoulos
- Dimitrios Oreinos
- Georgios Meletopoulos
- Inokentios Romaniolis
- Diomidis Polychroniadis
- Andreas Michalopoulos
- Sotirios Messinezis
- Athanassios Farazoulis
- Konstantinos Kanellopoulos
- Spyros Panagiotopoulos
- Leonidas Petropoulos
- Panagos Lyrintzis
- Efthymios Gatos
- Christos Lambouris
- Georgios Kanellopoulos
- Polychronis Noukopoulos
- Polychronis Polychroniadis
- Ioannis Stavropoulos (until 1936)
- Sotiris Stavropoulos (1936–1941, 1951–1952)

== Notable people ==
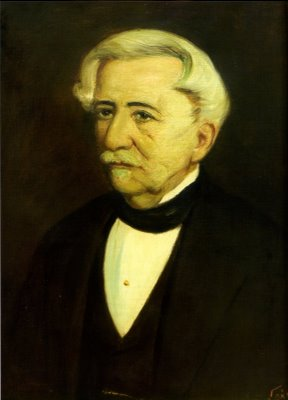
Andreas Londos

- Andreas Londos, fighter in the Greek War of Independence
- Panagiotis-Stavros Malliaris: admiral, member of the Navy Movement in 1973
- Dimitrios Meletopoulos, fighter in the Greek War of Independence
- Hermes Pan (1909-1990, original surname Panagiotopoulos), American dancer and choreographer who collaborated with Fred Astaire on his film musicals; Pan's father emigrated from Aigio and he maintained ties with family here
- Xeni Dimitriou (born 1952), former Prosecutor General of Greece

== Newspapers ==
- Filodimos
- Proti tis Aigialeias

== Sporting clubs ==
- Panegialios F.C., third division
- Aris Valimitika
- Egieas Egion
- Olympiakos Aigio
- T.A.D. '93 Aigiou
- Thyella Aigio
- Straton Aigiou.

== Gallery ==
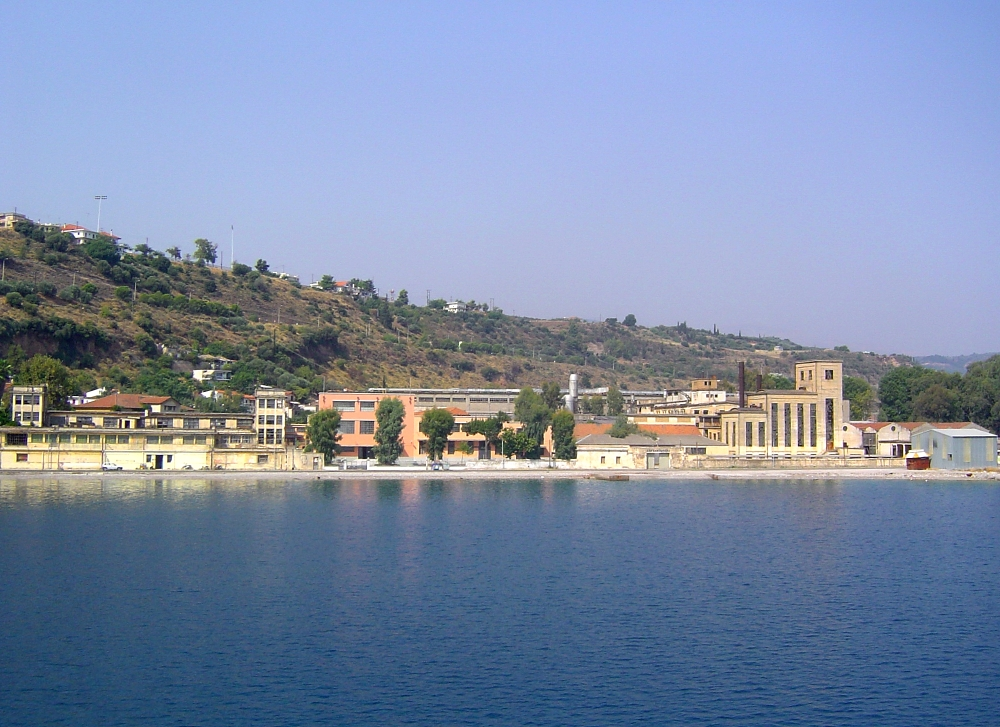
View from the sea

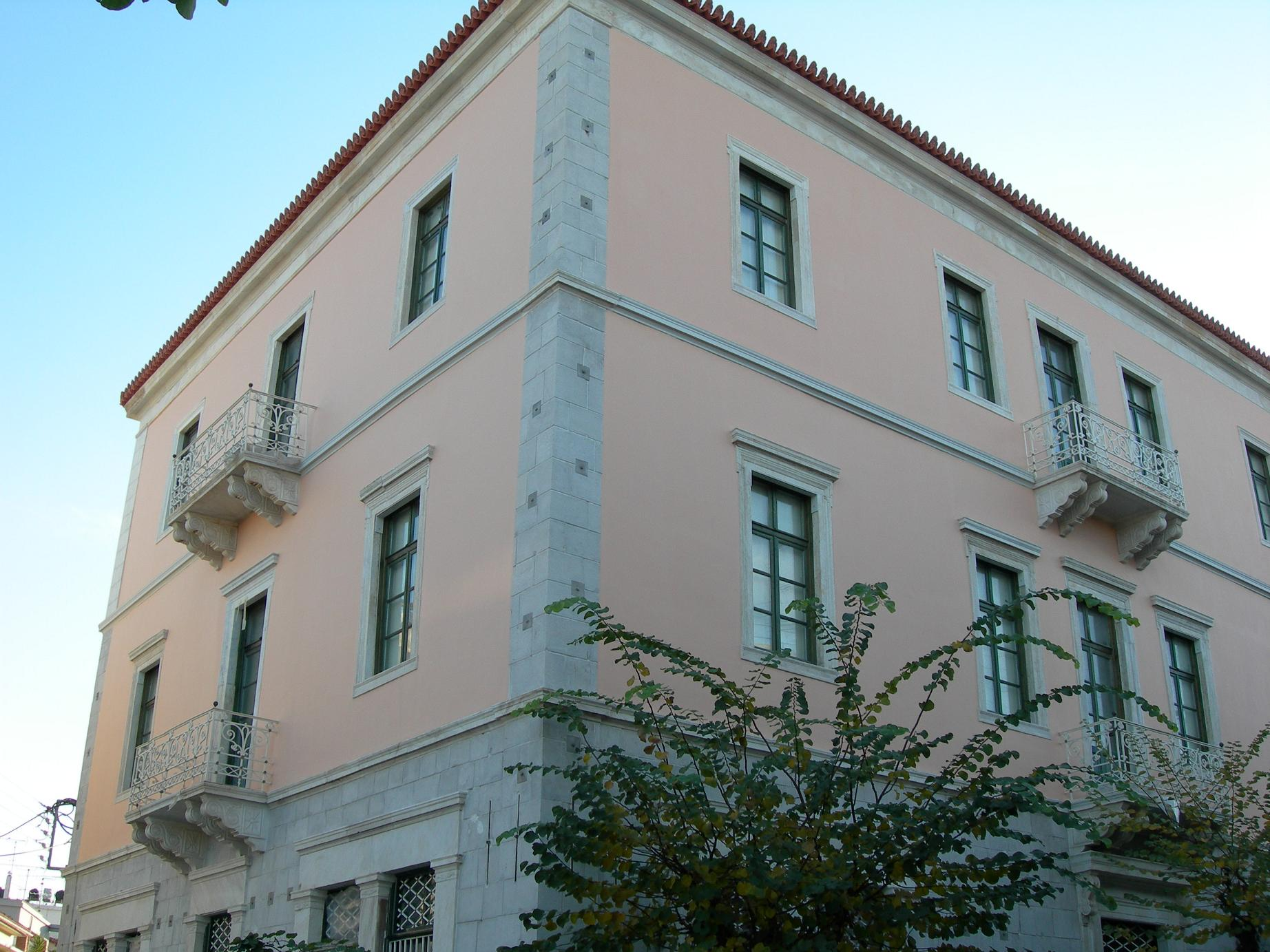
Panagiotopoulos mansion.

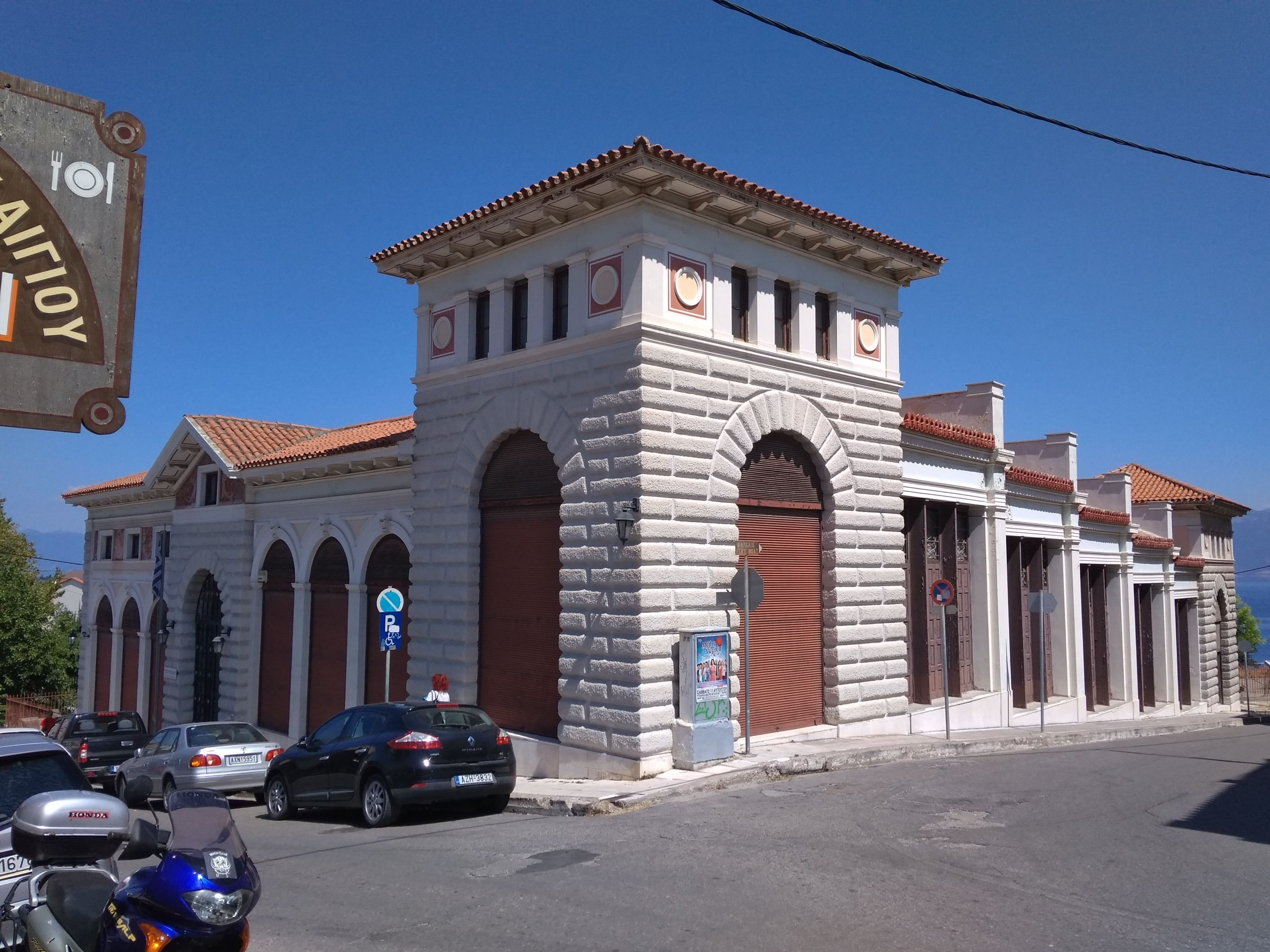
Archaeological Museum of Aigion (arch. Ernst Ziller)

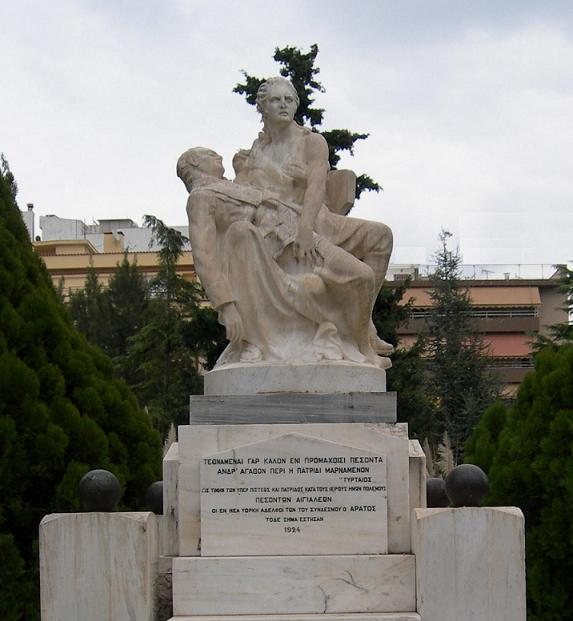
The Heroon. The inscription reads an epigram of Tyrtaeus.

== See also ==
- List of settlements in Achaea
