= Thymena =

Town on the Black Sea coast of ancient Paphlagonia

Coordinates: 41°57′30″N 33°11′21″E

Thymena (Ancient Greek: Θύμηνα), also called Thymaena or Teuthrania (Τευθρανία), was a town on the Black Sea coast of ancient Paphlagonia, at a distance of 90 stadia from Aegialus.

It is located near Uğurlu in Asiatic Turkey.
