= Xeni Dimitriou =

Greek prosecutor (born 1952)

- Ξένη Δημητρίου

Prosecutor General of Greece
- In office 1 July 2016 – 30 June 2019
- Preceded by: Euterpi Koutzamani
- Succeeded by: Vasilios Pliotas

Personal details
- Born: 1952 (age 73–74) Aigio, Peloponnese, Greece
- Education: Aristotle University of Thessaloniki

Xeni Dimitrou (Greek: Ξένη Δημητρίου; born 1952) is a Greek prosecutor. She served as the Prosecutor General of Greece between 2016 and 2019.

== Early life and education ==
Dimitrou was born in 1952 in Aigio, Peloponnese, Greece. She got a degree in law from the Aristotle University of Thessaloniki.

== Career ==
She began her career in the judiciary in November 1978. Dimitriou has handled cases such as the scandal surrounding the Piraeus–Three Bridges railway project and the prosecution of members of the anarchist urban guerrilla Conspiracy of Fire Nuclei.

In August 2012 Dimitriou was promoted to Deputy Prosecutor at the Supreme Civil and Criminal Court of Greece, with responsibility for juvenile cases. As a deputy public prosecutor, she initiated proceedings against neo-nazi political party Golden Dawn (Greece) and participated in the special court case against former minister of national economy Giorgos Papakonstantinou in the Lagarde list scandal, in which she sought a conviction for two serious offences, which ultimately did not succeed.

Dimitrou was appointed Prosecutor General of Greece on 9 June 2016 by the Greek government, to succeed Euterpi Koutzamani, and assumed the office on 1 July 2016. In September 2018, Dimitriou requested that the investigation into the deadly 2018 Mati fires be temporarily suspended pending further official reports. Following strong criticism from politicians and the media, she finally allowed the public prosecutor, Ilias Zagoraios, to continue the investigation. She also led investigations into the Novartis corruption scandal and ordered a review of allegations of possible manipulation and political pressure within the case, authorising the reopening of complaints lodged by former Prime Minister Antonis Samaras and former ministers Evangelos Venizelos and Dimitris Avramopoulos, who claimed they had been implicated in legal proceedings for political reasons. She retired on 30 June 2019 after reaching the age limit, and Vasilios Pliotas was appointed her successor on 28 August 2019.

On 19 February 2020, Dimitriou testified for 10 hours as a witness at the trial investigating the procedural aspects of the Novartis case.
