= Aegialus =

Ancient region in the Peloponnese and a coastal town in ancient Paphlagonia

Coordinates: 41°53′31″N 33°00′09″E

Aegialus or Aigialos (Ancient Greek: Αἰγιαλός), meaning "Coast-Land", refers to two ancient locations:

- A region in the northern Peloponnese, where Aegium is one of the main Achaean cities. The region later became known as Achaia.
- A coastal town in ancient Paphlagonia, located near Karaağaç Limanı, Asiatic Turkey.

Both locations are mentioned by Homer in Book 2 of the Iliad, with the first being an Achaean ally in line 575 and the second a Trojan alley in line 855.
