= Selinountas, Achaea =

Selinountas Σελινούς
- Community
- Location within Greece
- Coordinates: 38°13′N 22°06′E
- Country: Greece
- Administrative region: West Greece
- Regional unit: Achaea
- Municipality: Aigialeia
- Municipal unit: Aigio

Population (2021)
  - Community: 534
- Time zone: UTC+2 (EET)
  - Summer (DST): UTC+3 (EEST)

Selinountas (Greek: Σελινούντας, older form Selinous) is a village in the municipal unit of Aigio, Achaea, Greece. It is located on the right bank of the river Selinountas, about 4 km southeast of Aigio. The Greek National Road 8A (Patras - Aigio - Corinth) passes the village in the north.

== Population ==
Year	Population
1981	567
1991	561
2001	634
2011	449
2021	534

== See also ==
- List of settlements in Achaea
