= Proti tis Aigialeias =

Greek weekly newspaper

Proti tis Aigialeias Πρώτη της Αιγιαλείας
- Type: Weekly
- Founded: 1994
- Language: Greek
- Headquarters: Aigio, Greece

Proti tis Aigialeias (or -Egialias) (Greek: Πρώτη της Αιγιαλείας meaning the First in Aigaleia) is the most famous weekly newspaper that is based in Aigio in the Achaea prefecture in Greece and it serves the Aigaleia area. It was founded in 1994 as a weekly paper and it became daily in 1999. In the Saturday edition, it has a passo section with local stuff with several characteristics.

== See also ==
- List of newspapers in Greece
