= Kounina =

Kounina Κουνινά
- Community
- Location within Greece
- Coordinates: 38°12′N 22°01′E
- Country: Greece
- Administrative region: West Greece
- Regional unit: Achaea
- Municipality: Aigialeia
- Municipal unit: Aigio

Population (2021)
  - Community: 320
- Time zone: UTC+2 (EET)
  - Summer (DST): UTC+3 (EEST)

Kounina (Greek: Κουνινά) is a village and a community in the municipal unit of Aigio, Achaea, Greece. It is located west of the river Selinountas, and 8 km southwest of Aigio. The community includes the villages Agia Anna, Pelekistra and Petrovouni. The village suffered damage from the 2007 Greek forest fires.

== Population ==
Year	Village population	Community population
1981	-	655
1991	523	-
2001	481	687
2011	387	479
2021	267	320

== See also ==
- List of settlements in Achaea
