= Polichnitos =

Polichnitos Πολίχνιτος
- Municipal unit
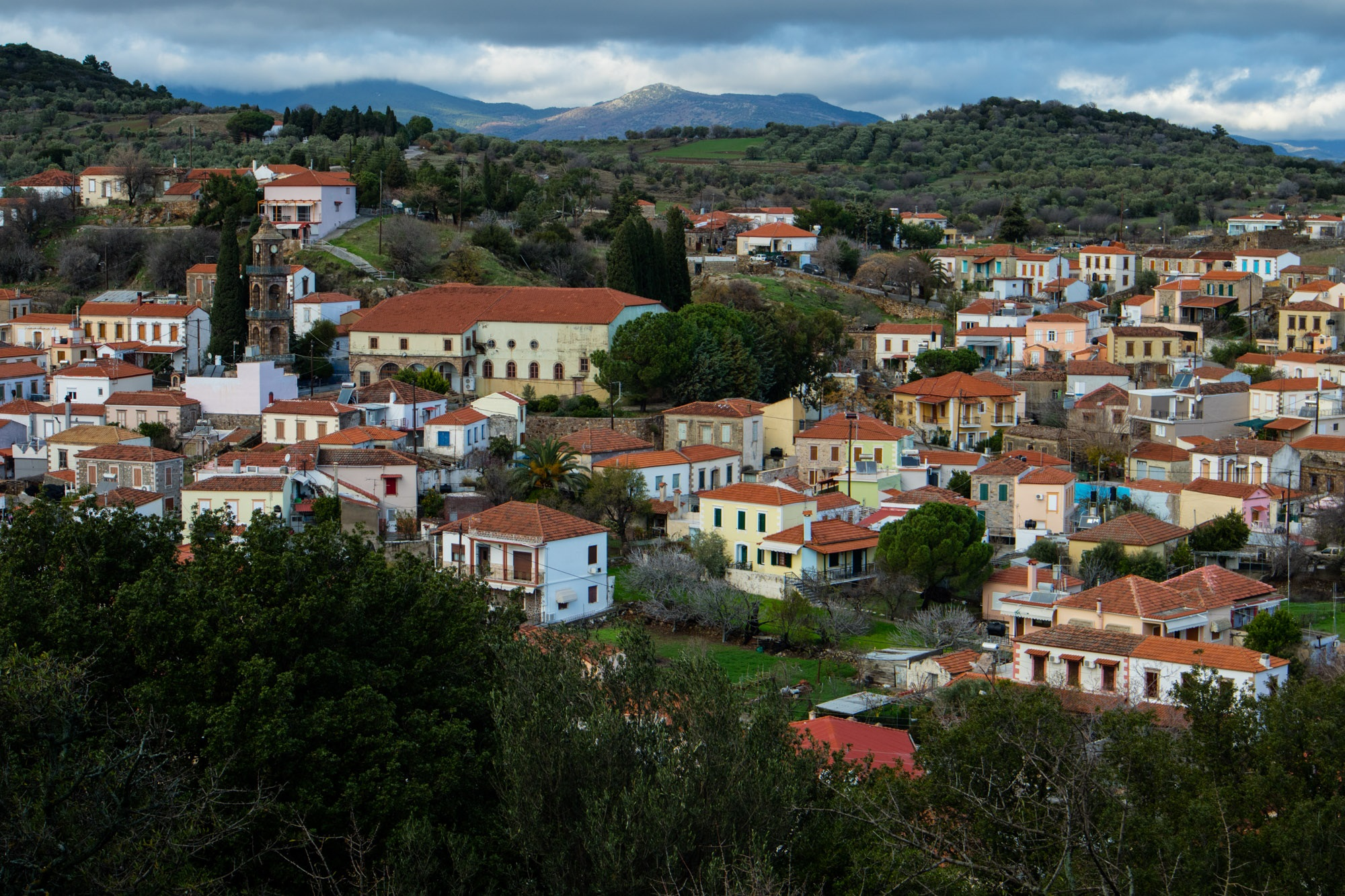

- Location within the regional unit

- Location within Greece
- Coordinates: 39°05′N 26°11′E
- Country: Greece
- Administrative region: North Aegean
- Regional unit: Lesbos
- Municipality: West Lesbos

Area
  - Municipal unit: 172.6 km^{2} (66.6 sq mi)

Population (2021)
  - Municipal unit: 3,438
  - Municipal unit density: 19.92/km^{2} (51.59/sq mi)
  - Community: 2,041
- Time zone: UTC+2 (EET)
  - Summer (DST): UTC+3 (EEST)
- Vehicle registration: MY

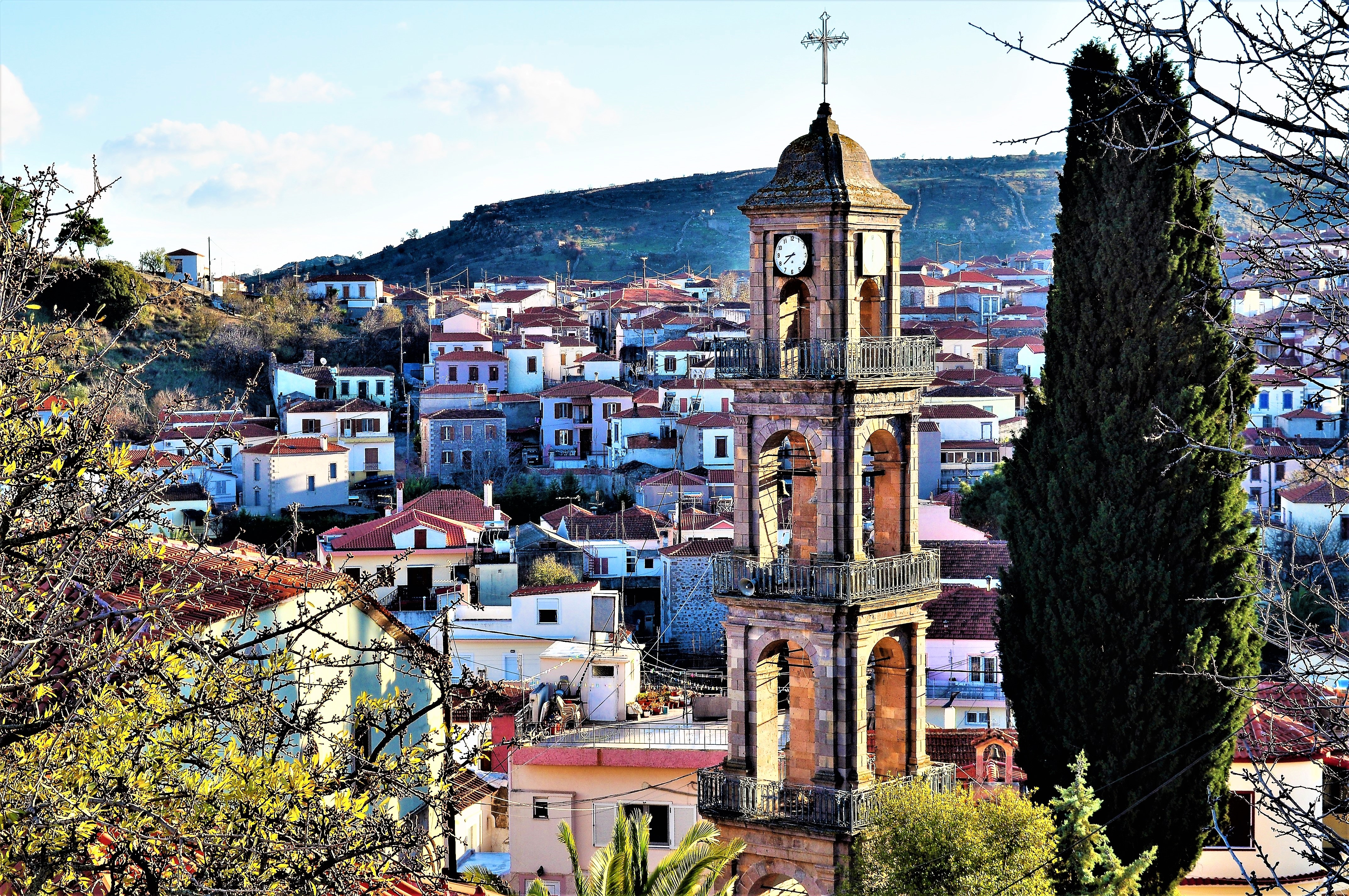
Panoramic view of Polichnitos

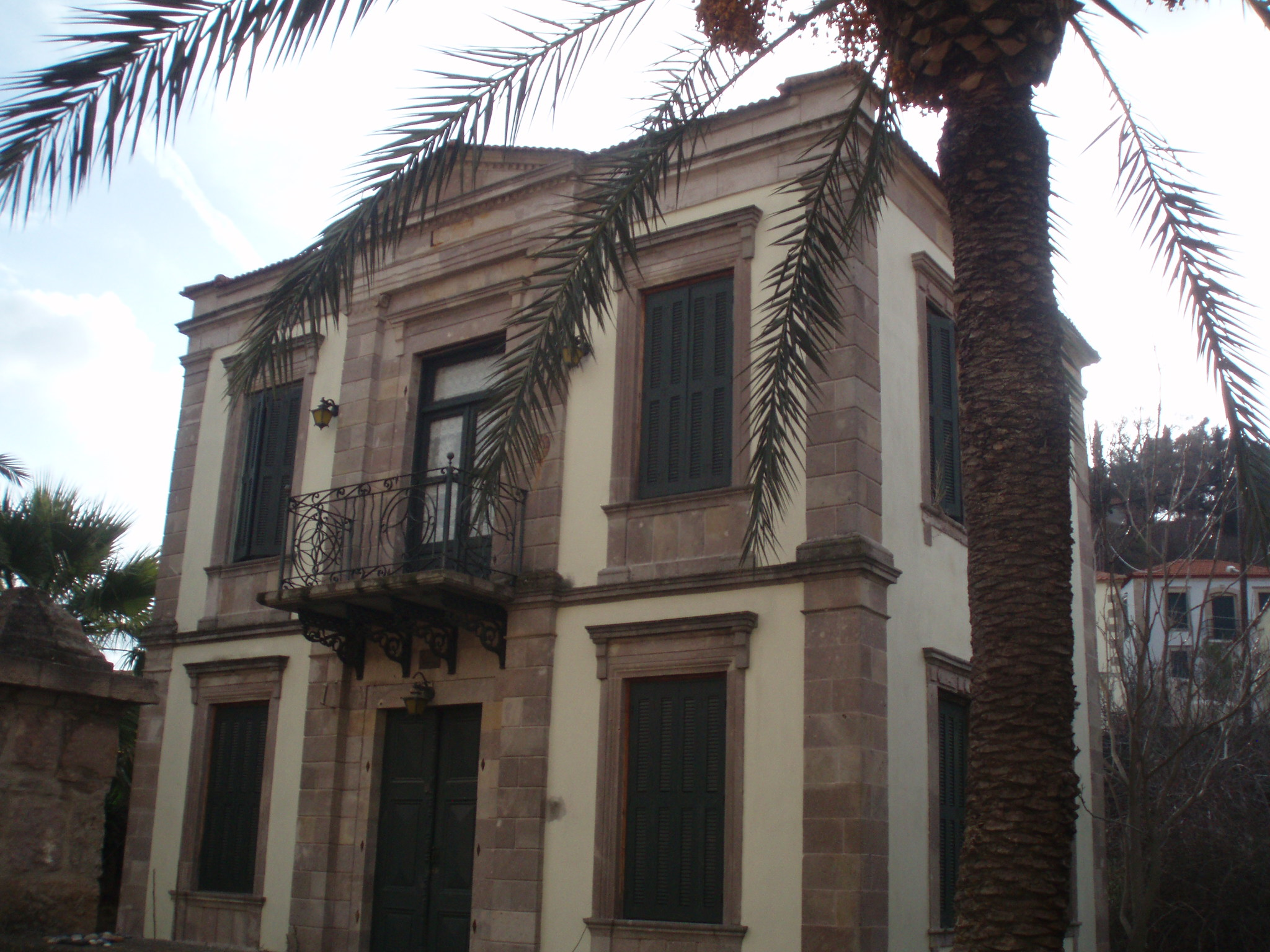
Traditional house in Polichnitos

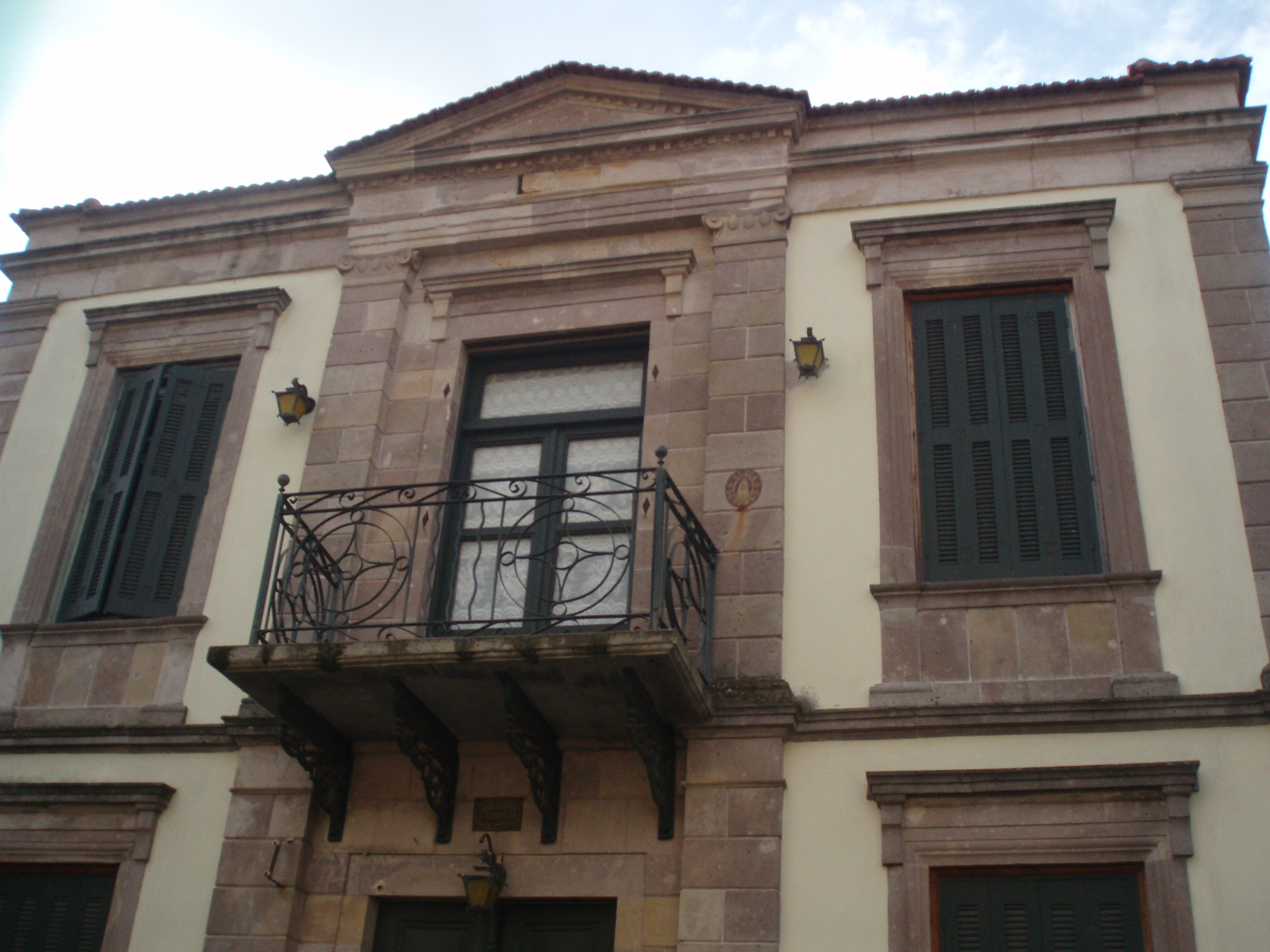
Traditional house in Polichnitos (closeup)

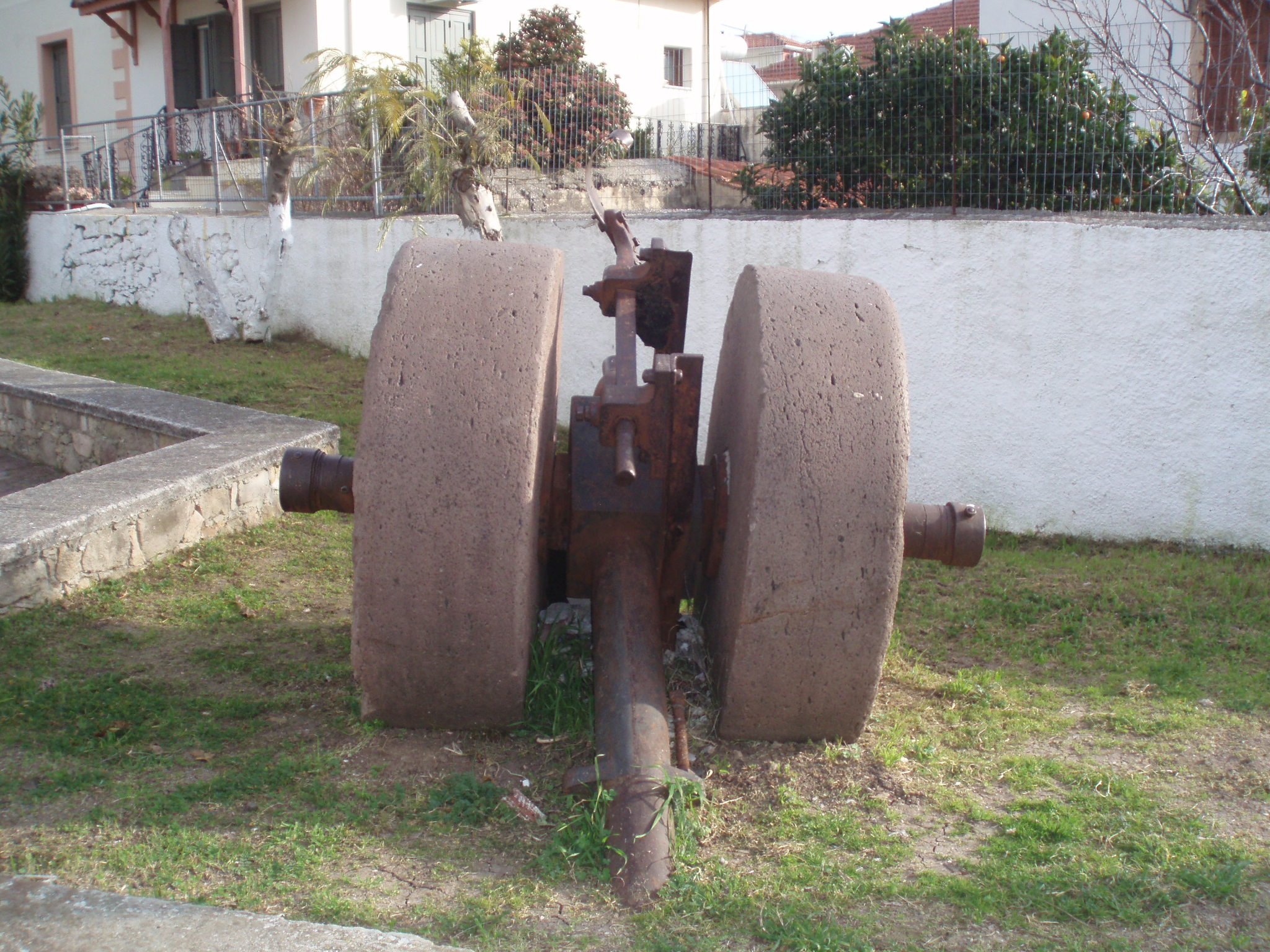
Millstones from the old oilmill in Polichnitos

Polichnitos (Greek: Πολίχνιτος) is a town and a former municipality on the island of Lesbos, North Aegean, Greece. Since the 2019 local government reform it is part of the municipality West Lesbos, of which it is a municipal unit. Population 3,438 (2021). The municipal unit is located in the central south coast of the island, adjacent to the south side of the Bay of Kalloni. It has a land area of 172.629 km^{2}. Its municipal seat is in the town of Polichnítos. The next largest villages are Vrísa, Vasiliká, and Lisvóri.

== Notable people ==
- Euterpi Koutzamani, first woman Prosecutor General of Greece.
