= Euterpi Koutzamani =

Greek prosecutor (born 1949)

- Ευτέρπη Κουτζαμάνη

Prosecutor General of Greece
- In office 1 August 2013 – 30 June 2016
- Preceded by: Ioannis–Spyridon Tentes
- Succeeded by: Xeni Dimitriou

Personal details
- Born: 1949 (age 76–77) Polichnitos, Lesbos, Greece
- Education: Aristotle University of Thessaloniki

Euterpi Koutzamani (Greek: Ευτέρπη Κουτζαμάνη; born 1949) is a Greek prosecutor, who served as the first woman Prosecutor General of Greece between 2013 and 2016. She is the president of the Greek National Council for Radio and Television since 2023.

== Early life and education ==
Koutzamani was born in 1949 in Polichnitos, in the Greek island of Lesbos in a rural family. She got a degree in law from the Law School of the Aristotle University of Thessaloniki in 1972.

== Career ==
She qualified as a lawyer in 1974 in Mitilene, and in July 1975 she was appointed legal assistant at the Athens Public Prosecutor’s Office after passing the competitive examination, becoming the first woman to join a Prosecutor's Office in Greece. She subsequently served in other public prosecutor’s offices of first instance in municipalities such as Drama, Kalamata and Nafplio, and became a public prosecutor of first instance in 1985 in Sparta and Athens. In 1995, Koutzamani was appointed deputy public prosecutor for appeals and served at the Athens Public Prosecutor’s Office for Appeals until 2003, when she became a public prosecutor for appeals in Athens.

In 2006, Koutzamani was promoted to the Supreme Civil and Criminal Court, where she served as the first female deputy prosecutor of the Supreme Court, a position she held until 2012. In 2010, Koutzamani was appointed chair of the five-member committee responsible for monitoring declarations of assets, a position she held until the committee was dissolved.

As a prosecutor, Koutzamani has handled notable cases such the robbery of Zaharis Bank and scandals involving the adulteration of fuel and olive oil, and the Labour Bank. She became known during the trial against Revolutionary Organization 17 November. During the case against neo-nazi political party Golden Dawn, Koutzamani received death threats in the form of bullets sent to her office.

In the cabinet meeting of 1 August 2013, Koutzamani was appointed the first woman Prosecutor General of Greece to succeed Ioannis–Spyridon Tentes. In January 2014, she ordered prosecutors across the country to investigate EU and state funds following allegations against former minister Michalis Liapis that he had used European funds to renovate his holiday house. She also intervened during farmers' strikes that were roadblocking. Koutzamani retired on 30 June 2016 after reaching the 41-year limit for service as a public prosecutor. In her farewell speech, she expressed her disappointment at attempts to undermine judicial independence. Previously, on 9 June 2016, Xeni Dimitriou was nominated as her successor.

In September 2023, Koutzamani was appointed president of the Greek National Council for Radio and Television.

== Personal life ==
She is widowed since 2011 and have no children.
