= Ilias Kanellopoulos =

Greek navy officer (1844–1894)

- Ηλίας Κανελλόπουλος
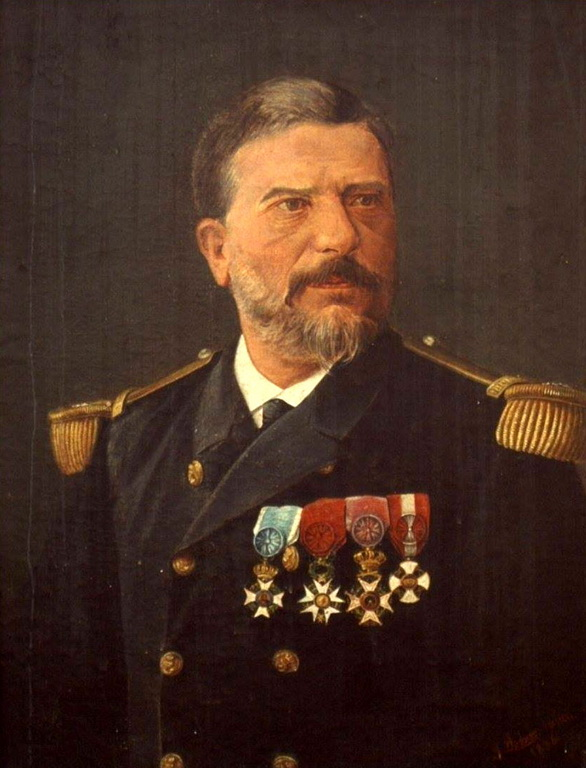
- 1886 portrait of Kanellopoulos, now at the Hellenic Maritime Museum
- Born: c. 1844; Nafplio
- Died: 8 April [O.S. 24 March] 1894
- Military career
- Allegiance: Kingdom of Greece
- Branch: (Greece) Royal Hellenic Navy; French Navy (on secondment)
- Service years: 1863–1894
- Rank: Lt. Commander

Signature
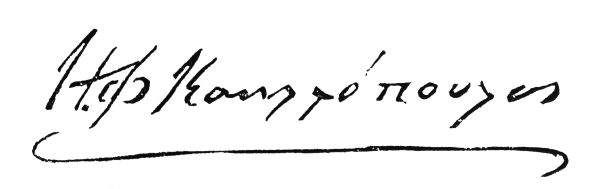

Ilias Kanellopoulos (Greek: Ηλίας Κανελλόπουλος, c. 1844 – 27 March 1894) was a Greek Navy officer, notable as director of the Hellenic Navy Academy in 1884–1890, during which he established it on a permanent basis and modernized its curriculum.

== Life ==
Ilias Kanellopoulos was born at Nafplio in about 1844. He joined the Royal Hellenic Navy in 1863 as a cadet, and graduated four years later as a line ensign.

Already as an ensign, he showed his intellectual skills and interests, translating on his own into Greek the French manuals on the handling of rigged and steam-driven vessels. For this he received the Silver Cross of the Order of the Redeemer, and was tasked with translating the French and British naval dictionaries into Greek. In 1875, he was promoted to second lieutenant. In the same year, he wrote a manual on sailing and rig handling. In early 1876 he was sent to France for further studies. He participated in a 13-month circumnavigation of the globe on board the French ship of the line Navarin. He kept a diary and made detailed scientific notes on his trip, which were submitted to the Greek Ministry for Naval Affairs in a report, but were never published. On his return to France, he was posted to the Greek embassy in Paris.

In 1880, he received the Officer of the Order of the Crown of Italy due to his role in saving the Italian steamship Nuova Girona. In the same year he left for Britain for studies. Promoted to lieutenant commander in 1882, he was sent to Britain, France, Denmark and Germany as part of a naval committee to examine the best type of battleship for purchase by Greece.

On his return to Greece, he busied himself with preparing the legal and institutional framework for the formal establishment of the Hellenic Navy Academy (it had previously existed unofficially and intermittently), being appointed its first director on 22 June 1884. This was a major undertaking: Kanellopoulos was not only the academy's director, but also professor of all naval-related subjects, for which he wrote the relevant manuals, from all issues regarding the handling of sailing ships to astronomy and cosmography, naval calculus, and naval artillery. At the same time, he authored the majority of naval-related legislation of the period, and wrote a number of studies on naval fortifications, the creation of a permanent arsenal and naval base, landing operations, etc. Along with his own mentor, Leonidas Palaskas, Kanellopoulos is considered as a major reformer and educator of the Greek navy in the 19th century.

He remained director of the Navy Academy, with the rank of commander, until 1890. In 1892 he was elected as a member of the Hellenic Parliament for Argos, but died on 27 March 1894. His nephews, Filippos and Konstantinos, also joined the Navy and became admirals.

== Honours ==
The Greek navy honoured his memory by giving his name to one of its training centres, established in 1948 at Skaramangas. In 1999, following a merger with the nearby Palaskas Training Centre, the name was retained for the base area, and further in 2008, the Kanellopoulos Naval Base was established at Skaramangas.
