= Achaea (ancient region) =

Coordinates: 38.0868°N 21.8598°E

Achaea Ἀχαΐα
- Region
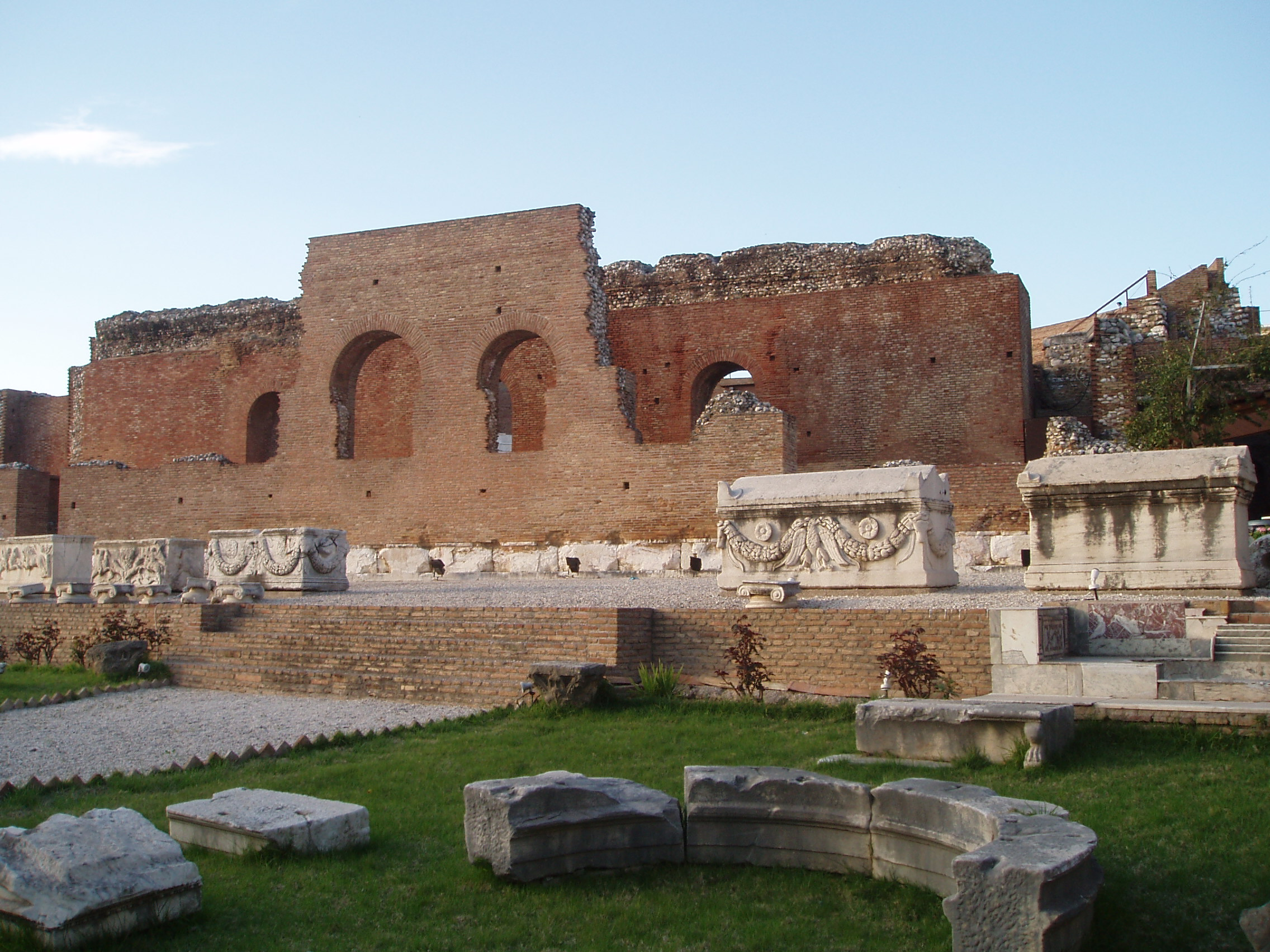
- Roman odeon, Patras

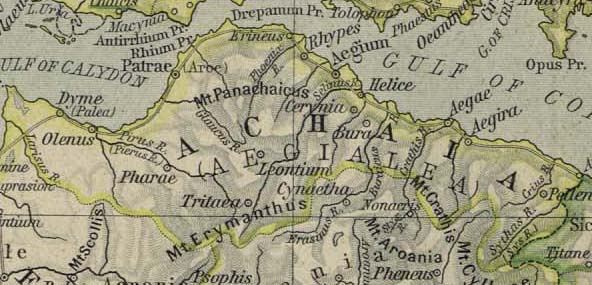
- Map of ancient Achaea
- Country: Greece
- Location: Peloponesse
- Major cities: Patras, Dyme
- Dialects: Achaean Doric
- Key periods: Achaean League (ca. 260–146 BC)

Achaea (/əˈkiːə/) or Achaia (/əˈkaɪə/; Greek: Ἀχαΐα, Akhaḯa, Ancient Greek: [akʰaía]) is the northernmost region of the Peloponnese, occupying the coastal strip north of Arcadia. Its approximate boundaries are: to the south, Mount Erymanthus; to the south-east, Mount Cyllene; to the east, Sicyon; and to the west, the Larissos river. Apart from the plain around Dyme in the west, Achaea is generally a mountainous region.

== Name ==
The name of Achaea has a slightly convoluted history. Homer uses the term Achaeans as a generic term for Greeks throughout the Iliad; conversely, a distinct region of Achaea is not mentioned. The region later known as Achaea is instead referred to as Aegialus. meaning "coastal land" with Aegium being one of the main Achaean cities. Aegialus in the northern Peloponnese is not to be confused with Aegialus, the region in Paphlagonia, in Anatolia. Both regions are mentioned by Homer in the Iliad, Book 2 with Peloponnesian Aegialus being mentioned in 2.575 and Paphlagonian Aegialus mentioned in 2.855.

Both Herodotus and Pausanias recount the legend that the Achaean tribe was forced out of their lands in the Argolis by the Dorians, during the legendary Dorian invasion of the Peloponnese. Consequently, the Achaeans forced the Aegialians (now known as the Ionians) out of their land. The Ionians took temporary refuge in Athens, and Aegialus became known as Achaea. It was supposedly for this reason that the region known as Achaea in Classical Greece did not correspond to Homeric references.

Under the Romans, Achaea was a province covering much of central and southern Greece. This is the Achaea referenced in the New Testament (e.g., Acts 18:12 and 19:21; Romans 15:26 and 16:5). However, Pausanias, writing in the 2nd century AD, devotes one of the books of Description of Greece to the ancient region of Achaea, showing that the name, locally at least, still preserved the use from the Classical period. The name, Achaea, was later used in the crusader state, the Principality of Achaea (1205–1432), which comprised the whole Peloponnese, thus more closely following Roman use. The modern Greek prefecture of Achaea is largely based on the ancient region.

== Proto-History ==
Dolmens and cromlechs have been found in the ancient area of Achaea dating back to the Neolithic period. Flint axes and blades fabricated from materials such as quartz or obsidian have been found in megalithic chamber tombs from this ancient region. Among other finds, alabaster pottery sherds have been discovered during excavations at Antheia in Achaia and dated to the thirteenth century BC.

== History ==
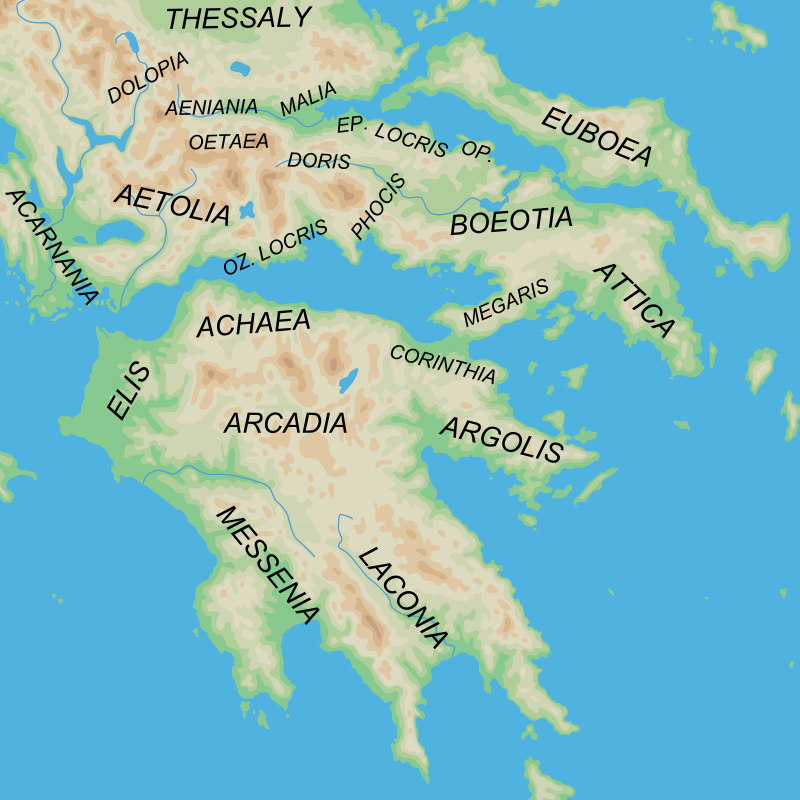
Map showing the position of Achaea in Peloponnesus.

=== Archaic and Classical Greece ===
The twelve cities of Achaea were grouped into an early Achaean League which had important cultural and religious functions. In its later 3rd century BC incarnation the Achaean League would play an important role in Greek politics.

According to Pausanias, in 688 BC the city of Hyperesia was threatened by an army from Sicyon. The locals defended their city by placing burning torches on their goats' (aiges in Greek) horns. The Sicyonians retreated and the Hyperesians renamed their town Aigeira (Greek: Aίγειρα) to honor the goats.

During the 5th century BC the cities of Achaea were neutral in the Persian Wars and were usually neutral in the struggles between Athens and Sparta. We begin to hear more of Achaea in the following centuries.

In 373 BC, the Achaean city of Helike was destroyed in a great cataclysm. "Immense columns of flame", the first record in history of the phenomenon of earthquake lights, were seen in the days leading up to the earthquake. The quake hit at night causing Helike to subside and then a massive tsunami rushed in from the Corinthian Gulf to inundate the city. All the inhabitants perished. The city of Boura, further inland, was also destroyed in the earthquake.

In 367 BC, during Epaminondas' third invasion of the Peloponnese, the Achaean cities agreed to an alliance with Thebes. But soon when oligarchs retook the cities of Achaea they allied with Sparta against Epaminondas. At the Battle of Mantinea in 362 BC the Achaeans were allied to Sparta, Athens and Mantinea against Thebes.

The Achaeans were part of the Greek alliance led by Thebes and Athens which was defeated by King Philip II of Macedon at the Battle of Chaeronea in 338 BC. Subsequently, Achaea was part of the Macedonian dominated Corinthian League.

=== Roman period ===
Achaea was conquered by the Romans in the year 146 BC. Emperor Augustus established Achaea as a senatorial province; generally speaking, the region benefited from the enlightened attitude of Roman emperors such as Augustus. This was because Achaea was geographically closer to Rome than other provinces, and so it was given political advantages and greater status in order for the Roman court to maintain a political equilibrium within the empire.

The rule of Achaea in Roman times was placed under the Senate while a proconsul of Praetorian rank was appointed as its governor with the administrative seat in Corinth. However, Rome exercised fairly light control over Achaea: no Roman garrisons were posted there, native religious and social groups were widely tolerated by the Romans, and a general sense of free determination amongst the Greeks was commonplace. After the reign of Augustus the province of Achaea was combined with Macedonia from the years 15 until 44, coinciding with the frontier troubles. This combined imperial province was overseen by a governor placed at Moesia along the Danube River. In the year 67, Emperor Nero declared Greece to be politically free from the Roman Empire, and the Greeks began their own autonomous rule. However, Roman authority over Greece was reestablished soon after with Emperor Vespasian, who placed the province once again in the hands of the Roman Senate.

== Cities that were part of the region ==
- Dyme
- Olenus
- Patras
- Pharae
- Tritaea
- Aegium
- Boura
- Helike
- Leontium
- Rhypes
- Aegae

== Sources ==
- Homer, The Odyssey
- Homer, The Iliad
- Herodotus, The Histories
- Pausanias, Description of Greece
- Bunson, Matthew (1994). Encyclopedia of the Roman Empire. New York: Facts on File Inc.
