= Filippos Kanellopoulos =

Greek Navy officer

Filippos Kanellopoulos (Greek: Φίλιππος Κανελλόπουλος) was a Greek Navy officer who reached the rank of vice admiral.

He was born in 1868, the nephew of the notable naval officer and educator Ilias Kanellopoulos. He joined the Royal Hellenic Navy as an ensign in 1888, fought in the Greco-Turkish War of 1897, reached the rank of vice admiral, and died on 12 September 1927.

His younger brother, Konstantinos, also became a naval officer and reached the rank of rear admiral.
