= Aigio General Hospital =

General Hospital of Aigio

Geography
- Location: Aigio, Achaia, Greece
- Coordinates: 38.24201°N 22.07271°E

Organisation
- Care system: Public
- Type: District General

Services
- Emergency department: Yes
- Beds: 100

History
- Founded: 1958 (new building 1995)

Links
- Website: www.gnaa.gr/home
- Lists: Hospitals in Greece

The East Achaia General Hospital - Aigio Hospital Unit (Greek: Γενικό Νοσοκομείο Ανατολικής Αχαΐας - Οργανική Μονάδα Αιγίου), commonly known as Aigio Hospital is a public general hospital situated a few kilometres out of the town of Aigio in the Peloponnese peninsula of southern Greece. It has a capacity of 100 beds. The total personnel of the hospital numbered 217 in 2013. Approximately 4,000 patients are hospitalized annually, and around 1,000 major and moderate surgeries, along with another 1,000 minor procedures, are performed each year. The East Achaia General Hospital in Aigio offers a wide range of specialized medical services, including departments for Internal Medicine, Cardiology, Pediatrics, Surgery, Obstetrics & Gynecology, Orthopedics, Urology, Ophthalmology, and various laboratory services such as Radiology, Biochemistry, and Pathology. In 2007 the operating rooms of the surgery department were destroyed by fire and were totally rebuilt in 2008. A new 500 sq.m. Emergency Department (ED) area is currently under construction. The project is expected to be completed by the end of 2026. The hospital launched its new bilingual website in 2026, offering an improved online experience in both English and Greek for patients and visitors.
