= Filodimos =

Newspaper in Greece

Filodimos Φιλόδημος
- Type: Weekly
- Format: N/A
- Owner(s): N/A
- Founded: 1886
- Headquarters: Aigio, Greece
- Website: www.filodimos.gr

Filodimos (Greek: Φιλόδημος) is a newspaper that was founded in 1886 in Aigio, Greece. The newspaper is the first publication ever established in the city.

== See also ==
- List of newspapers in Greece
