= Pteri =

Pteri Πτέρη
- Community
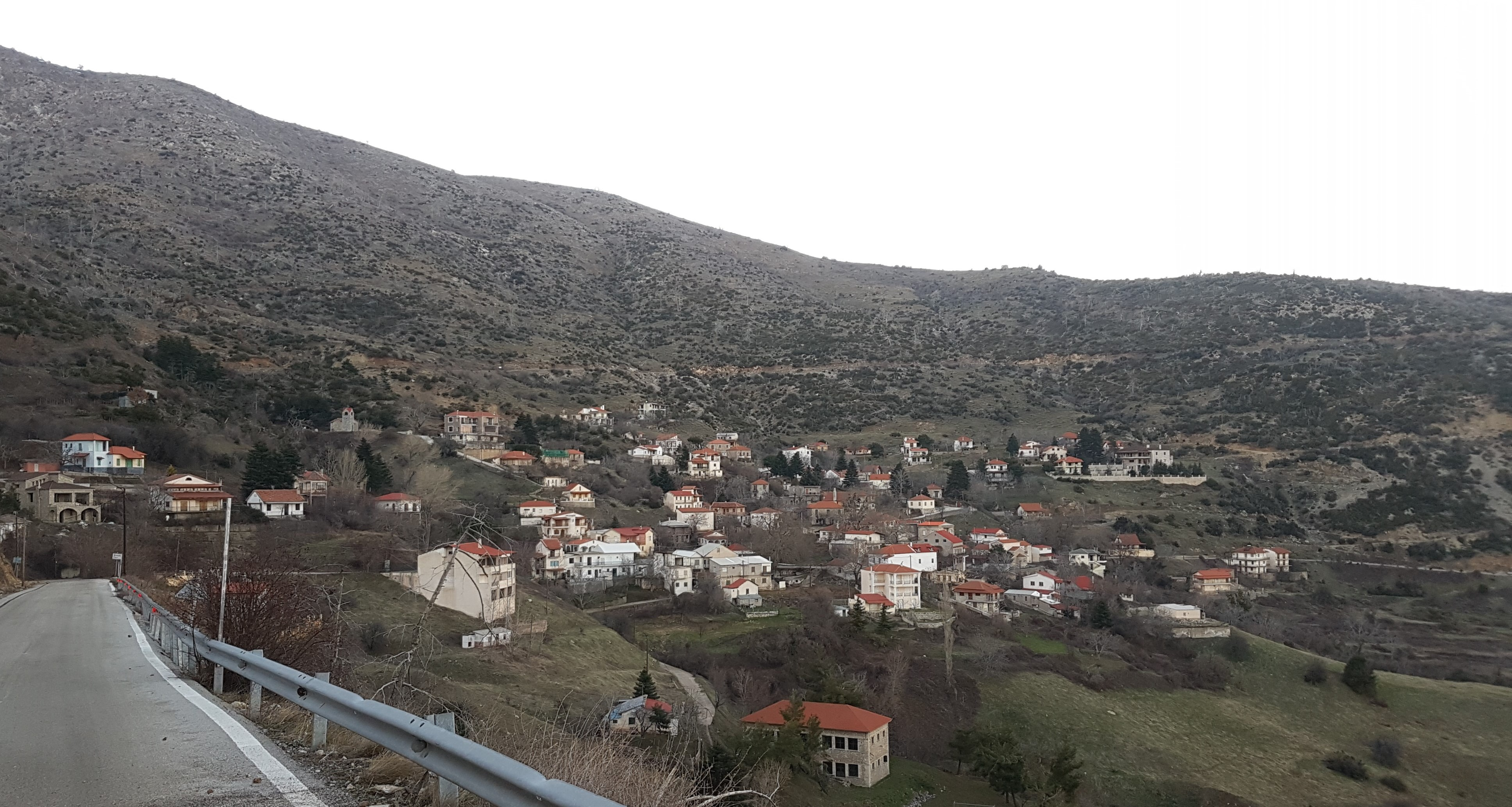
- Pteri

- Location within Greece
- Coordinates: 38°09′N 22°04′E
- Country: Greece
- Administrative region: West Greece
- Regional unit: Achaea
- Municipality: Aigialeia
- Municipal unit: Aigio

Population (2021)
  - Community: 439
- Time zone: UTC+2 (EET)
  - Summer (DST): UTC+3 (EEST)

Pteri (Greek: Πτέρη) is a village and a community in Achaea, Greece. It is located about 15 km (9.3 mi) south of Aigio, and east of the Selinountas river valley. Pteri is part of the municipal unit of Aigio.

== Population ==
Year	Village population	Community population
1981	-	781
1991	30	-
2001	20	633
2011	4	466
2021	21	439

== See also ==
- List of settlements in Achaea
- Konstantinos Gofas
