= Archaeological Museum of Aigion =

Coordinates: 38°15′9.3″N 22°5′16.7″E

- Δήμος Αιγιάλειας
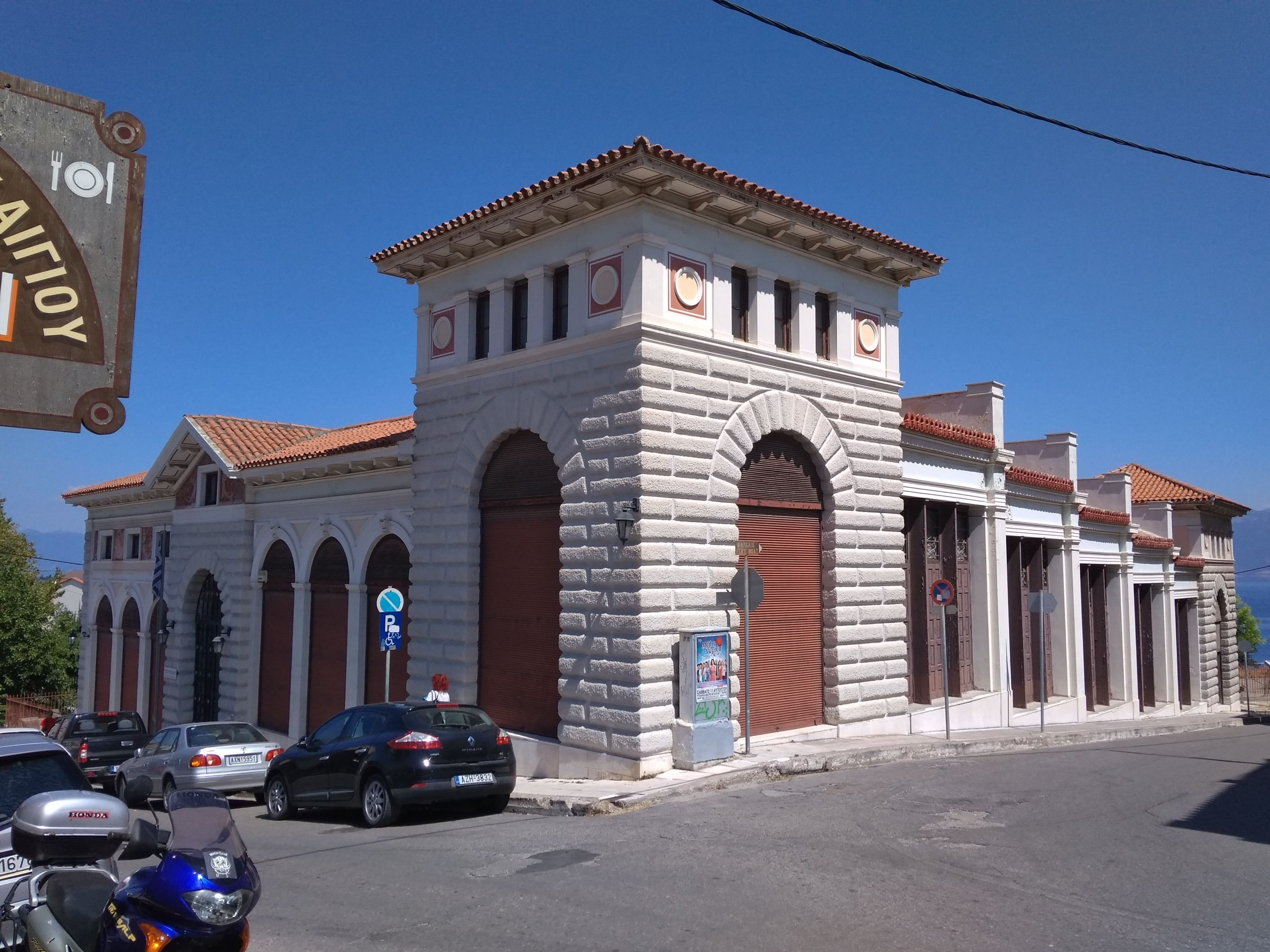
- Archaeological Museum of Aigio (Ex municipal market, work of Ernst Ziller
- Established: 6 August 1994; 31 years ago
- Location: Aigion, Greece
- Type: Archaeology museum
- Collections: findings from the Neolithic period to the late Roman
- Architect: Ernst Ziller
- Website: aigialeia.gov.gr

The Archaeological Museum of Aigion is a museum in Aigion, Greece, was opened on August 6, 1994. Originally, the museum building served as the municipal market of Aigio. It was designed by architect Ernst Ziller and constructed in 1890.

The museum comprises six rooms that showcase artifacts from the Neolithic period to the late Roman era.
