= Battle of Leontion =

Battle of the Social War

Coordinates: 38.1197247°N 21.7919124°E

- Part of the Social War (220–217 BC)
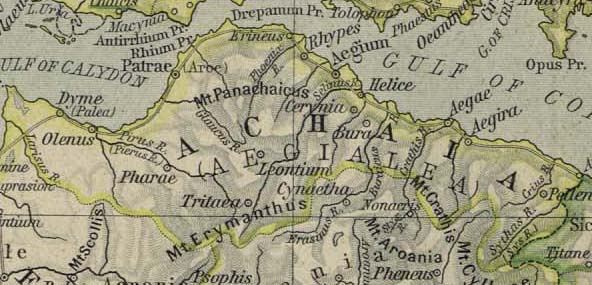
- Ancient Achaea
Date	217 BC
Location	Leontium Achaea
Result	Achaean victory

Belligerents
Achaean League	Aetolian League; Elis

Commanders and leaders
Lycus of Pharae	Euripidas of Aetolia

Strength
	2,000 infantry 60 cavalry

Casualties and losses
	400 dead 200 prisoners

The Battle of Leontion in 217 BC was the last battle of the Social War, fought between the Achaean League and the Aetolian League. The battle is mentioned by the historian Polybius and by the Achaean poet Damagetus, who calls it the "Battle at the Achaean Trench".

== Prelude ==
In the first years of the war, the Aetolians had raided the Peloponnese on several occasions, and the Achaeans appeared incapable of defending their territory. For this reason, after the Battle of Caphyae, the Achaean leader Aratus of Sicyon had called on the Hellenic allies for help. In the winter of 219/218 BC, the Macedonian king responded by launching a winter offensive in Arcadia, Elis, and Triphylia. During this campaign, he captured the Aetolian general Euripidas.

Based in allied Elis, Euripidas had been one of the most active Aetolian generals in the war, raiding the Western Peloponnese year after year. After his capture, the Aetolians sent Pyrrhias of Aetolia to command their forces in Elis. However, the Eleans were not satisfied with their new commander. When they heard that Euripidas had been released on parole by the Macedonians, they asked to have him back.

In the summer of 217 BC, Euripidas planned to repeat his incursions of the previous years to demoralize the enemy. He assembled 2000 foot soldiers and 60 horsemen, and when the Achaeans were united in assembly, he invaded the territory next to their capital, Aigion. After collecting enough booty, he retreated into the mountains around Leontion.

Earlier that year, however, the Achaean leader Aratus had reorganized the army, creating regional commands for quicker reaction to any local threat. The Hypostrategos of the Western district was Lycus of Pharae, who moved fast enough to block the further retreat of the Aetolians in the pass between Mount Panachaikon and Mount Erymanthos near Leontion.

== Battle ==
The Achaeans immediately attacked with ferocious courage, killing 400 enemies and taking 200 prisoners, among them some very prominent Eleans and Aetolians listed by Polybius. (Note: The names given are Phissias, Antanor, Clearchus, Androlochus, Evanoridas, Aristogeiton, Nicasippus and Aspasius. Evanoridas can be identified with the former Olympic victor Evanoridas of Elis, writer of a history of the Olympic games.) Moreover, they took the enemies' weapons and the whole booty away.

After this success, Lycus called for the hipparch Demodocus and the Achaean cavalry, and together they entered the territory of Elis, where they killed 200 more and took 80 prisoners.

The Achaean poet Damagetus seems to refer to the same battle in two of his epitaphs, where he talks of a "battle at the Achaean graben", specifying that the purpose of the encounter was to avenge the looting of Patras. The dedication is for one soldier on each side: a hot-blooded Elean called Chaironides and a young Achaean ephebos called Machatas, who both fell in battle.

== Aftermath ==
About the same time of the land battle, the Achaean navarch took 100 prisoners on the Aetolian coast and captured two large plus one smaller enemy vessel with their entire crews, and this string of success finally helped to raise the morale of the Achaeans.

The war ended the same autumn, when the Macedonian king Philip V learned about the Roman defeat by Hannibal at Lake Trasimene and decided that Italy was a worthier battleground.
