= Panagia Trypiti =

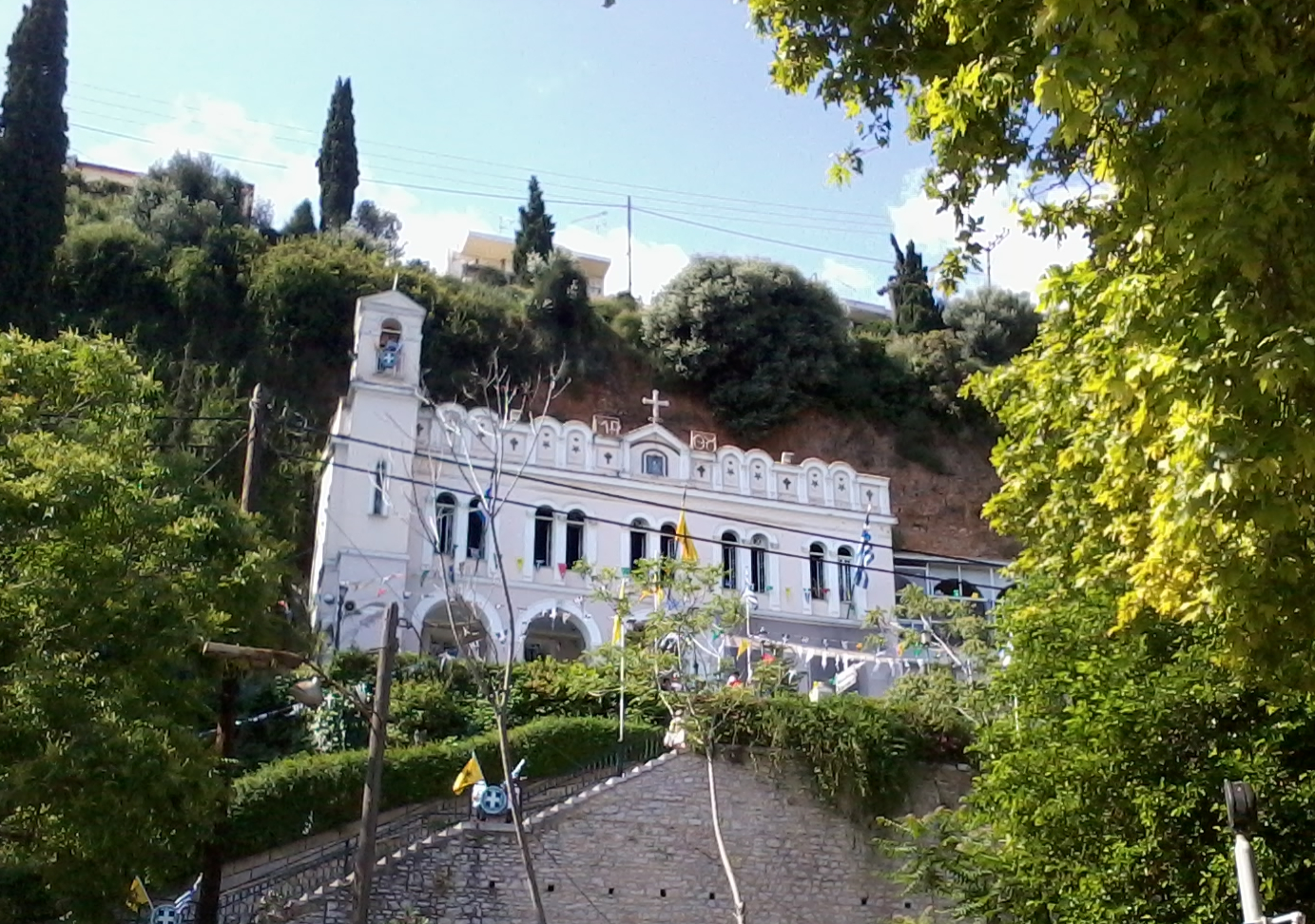
The shrine of Panagia Trypiti.

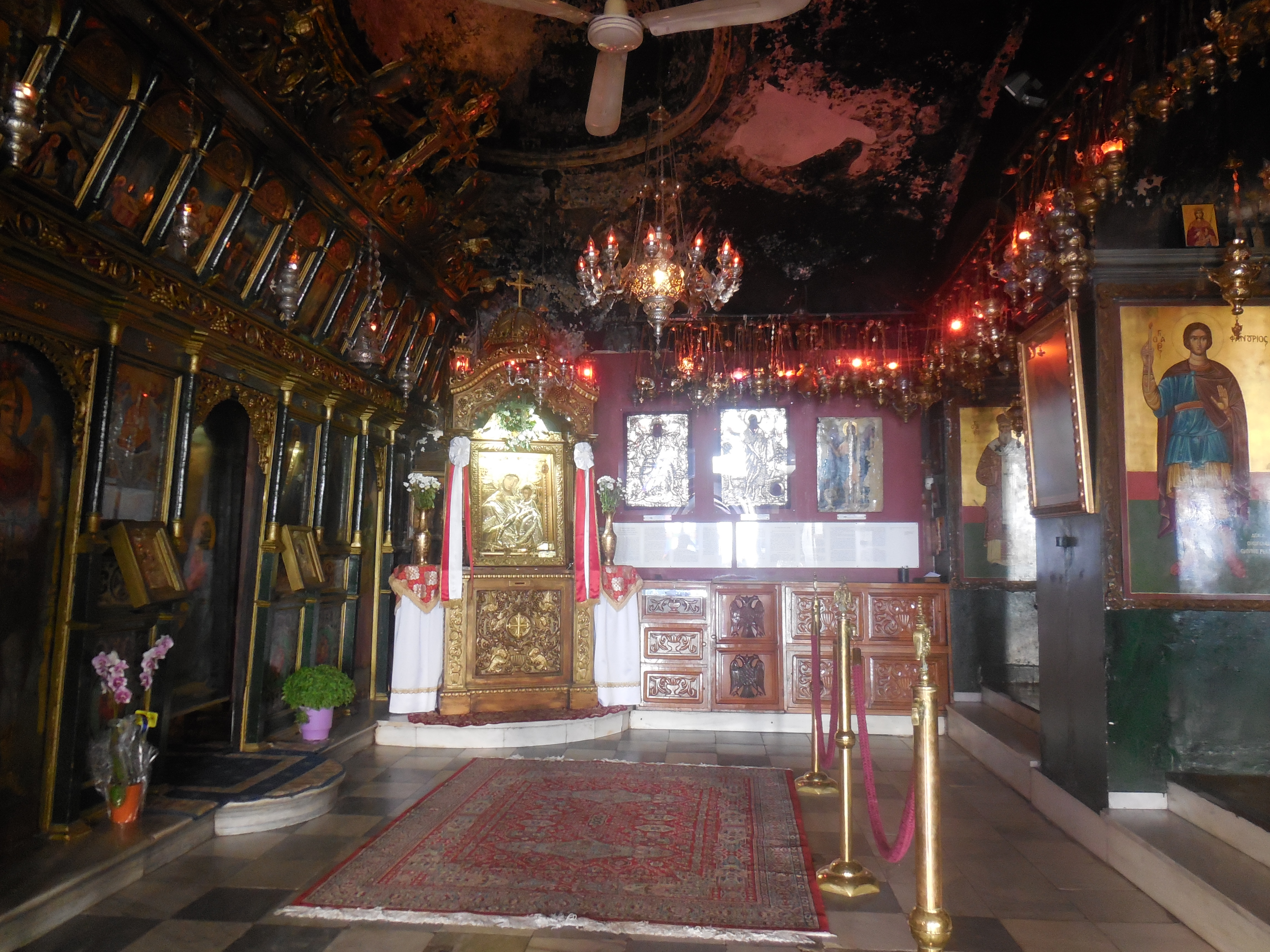
The inside of the Church of Panagia Trypiti in the rock; a religious icon of Panagia is visible in the background.

Panagia Trypiti (Greek: Παναγία Τρυπητή) is a historic sacred shrine of Theotokos in the town of Aigio, Greece. It is one of the most important Orthodox shrines of pilgrimage in Greece. The shrine is dedicated to the Mother of God of the Life-giving Spring. It is built on a steep cliff almost 30 meters high, near to sea. The many and impressive miracles which occur through the intercessions of the Virgin Mother have consecrated the church in the conscience of the faithful as a national shrine. Thousands of believers, from all over Greece, arrive at Aigio on Bright Friday every year, to get Panagia's grace and to get Her blessing. In the 14th volume of the French monthly magazine Revue des deux Mondes of the year 1876 it is mentioned that it was a big fest for the people of Aeghion "grande fête locale à Aigion ... Dès le matin, tous les habitans, hommes, femmes, enfans, s'y rendent en pèlerinage; puis tous reviennent ensemble au milieu des fusillades et des détonations des varellota (petit baril)". It even mentions the use of firecrackers that day. This day every year there is a procession of the Holy Icon through the streets of Aigio and it is an official religious holiday (recognized as an official holiday by a Royal decree of 8 May 1933). The name Trypiti comes from the Greek word tripa (Greek: Τρύπα) meaning hole, cave, because the miraculous icon of Panagia was found in a hole in the rock. In the narthex of the church (which is on the ground floor) there is a spring of water (Greek: Αγίασμα).The faithful drink this water as a blessing since it is believed that it works miraculous cures.

== History ==
The church was built on the site where the grace-filled Icon of Panagia was miraculously discovered in the middle of the sixteenth century by a voyager who was ship-wrecked off the shores of the Corinthian Gulf. In the darkness of the night the castaway saw from far a strong light shining near the shore. This light fitted him with courage and determination. When he finally made his way ashore he managed to reach the place where the light shone and there he was amazed to find himself before an icon of Panagia which was surrounded by light. The shipwrecked kneeled down and prayed. Out of gratitude he contributed money for the erection of a small chapel on the spot. The shipwrecked became the first monk and servant of the Virgin Mary and he lived all his life in an asceterion just behind the church. The first church was intended to be built beside the place where the icon was found (because of the morphology of the rock) but miraculously few days after the start of the construction works, there was enough space exactly on the place of the icon in the rock for building a small church. This church in the rock is till today the heart of the shrine but later in the 19th century it was expanded and took the form that it has today.

== Restoration works ==
From 2019, the church was closed to visitors to allow a comprehensive restoration and modernisation project, funded through the Interreg Greece–Italy 2014–2020 European Territorial Cooperation programme. Works included installation of external elevators and a disabled-access lift, slope reinforcement to prevent rockfalls, restoration of mural paintings and icons, and general maintenance of the buildings. During this period, the holy icon of Panagia Trypiti was transferred to the Church of Panagia Faneromeni in the centre of Aigio. The project was carried out by the Region of Western Greece under the supervision of the Ephorate of Antiquities of Achaia. The restoration was completed by 2023, and on Lazarus Saturday of that year the holy icon was ceremonially returned to the renovated shrine in a public ceremony.
