= Aegium =

Town and polis of ancient Achaea

Coordinates: 38°15′10″N 22°04′55″E

Aegium or Aigion (Ancient Greek: Αἴγιον), or Aegeium or Aigeion (Αἴγειον), was a town and polis (city-state) of ancient Achaea, and one of the twelve Achaean cities. It was situated upon the coast west of the river Selinus, 30 stadia from Rhypae, and 40 stadia from Helice.

The city stood between two promontories in the corner of a bay, which formed the best harbour in Achaea next to that of Patrae. It is said to have been formed out of a union of seven or eight villages. It was already mentioned in the Homeric Catalogue of Ships in the Iliad. When the neighbouring city of Helice sank into the sea following an earthquake in 373 BCE, Aegium annexed its territory and became the chief city of the Achaean League. When the League dissolved later in the same century, however, Aegium came for some time under Macedonian rule.

Eventually, the Achaean League was refounded by the cities of Dyme and Patras in 280 BC, and the citizens of Aegium, taking courage to expel the Macedonian garrison, joined in 275 BC. From this time on Aegium served as the capital of the Achaean League. It was the meeting place for the assembly of the Achaeans and retained this distinction until Philopoemen carried a law that the meeting might be held in any of the towns of the confederacy. Even under the Roman Empire the Achaeans were allowed to keep up the form of their periodical meetings at Aegium, just as the Amphictyons were permitted to meet at Thermopylae and Delphi.

The meetings were held in a grove near the sea, called Homagyrium or Homarium, sacred to Zeus Homagyrius or Homarius (Ὁμαγύριον, Ὁμάριον); a temple was also there called Homarium. Close to this grove was a temple of Demeter Panchaea. The words Homagyrium, 'assembly', and Homarium, 'union', refer to those meetings, though in later times they were explained as indicating the spot where Agamemnon assembled the Grecian chieftains before the Trojan War. There were several other temples and public buildings at Aegium, of which an account is given by Pausanias.

Aegium had several Olympic winners including Xenophon, Ladas (stadion race), Athenodorus (Αθηνόδωρος) (stadion race), Straton (Στράτων) (pancration and wrestling).

Its site is located near the modern city of Aigio.

Map of ancient Achaea (with place names in Greek)

== See also ==
- List of ancient Greek cities
