= Homarium =

Common sanctuary of the Achaean League (built c. 371 BC)

Achaean League coin showing Zeus Amarios

The Homarium, Homagyrium or Amarion (Ancient Greek: Ἀμάριον) was the common sanctuary of the Achaean League, built c. 371 BC at Aegium. It was so named as it was dedicated to Zeus Amarios (Ancient Greek: Ἀμάριος) or Homarios (Ὁμάριος) or Homagyrios (Ὁμαγύριος) (Latinized as Homarius and Homagyrius, the exact meaning of the epithets is uncertain, but probably "god of the assembly, he who unites"), and was used, according to Polybius, for meetings and debates on Achaean lines. Strabo describes it as a grove, near a temple of Demeter Panachaia.

== Descriptions ==
Again, according to Polybius [5:93] resolutions to internal Achaean disputes during the Social War were recorded on a stele erected near the altar of Hestia or Vesta.

Pausanias described the Homarium at Aegium in the 2nd century:

"By the sea at Aigion [in Akhaia] is a sanctuary of . . . Zeus Homagyrios (the Assembler). Here are images of Zeus, of Aphrodite and of Athena. The surname Assembler was given to Zeus because in this place Agamemnon assembled the most eminent men in Greece, in order that they might consult together how to make war on the empire of Priamos. Among the claims of Agamemnon to renown is that he destroyed Troy and the cities around her with the forces that followed him originally, without any later reinforcements . . . Even in my time the Akhaian assembly still meets at Aigion, just as the Amphiktyones do at Thermopylai and at Delphoi."

He also mention the priesthood and organisation of the temple:

"There are at Aigion [in Akhaia] other images made of bronze, Zeus as a boy and Herakles as a beardless youth, the work of Ageladas of Argos. Priests are elected for them every year, and each of the two images remains at the house of the priest. In a more remote age there was chosen to be priest for Zeus from the boys he who won the prize for beauty. When his beard began to grow the honor for beauty passed to another boy. Such were the customs."

The Acahean colonies in Italy, Sybaris, Caulon and Kroton similarly established a Homarium as a common forum.

Pope, in his 1715 Essay introducing his translation of Homer's Iliad, refers a temple erected to Homer as "the true Homærium", and comments on dispute over its locality. By 1872 this was described as a back-formation.

=== Zeus Amarios ===
Nineteen states of the Achaean League minted triobols (or hemidrachms), small silver coins worth three obols, carrying a bust of Zeus Amarios on the obverse. Later bronze coins were minted by the members of the league, also bearing the image of Zeus Amarios, holding a miniature Nike, presenting him a wreath. The later bronze mintage is remarkable for the number of towns and villages that produced coins, some forty five, and the number of die used, estimated at 1600.

== Achaean oath ==
The Achaean oath was taken upon the trinity of Hamarium Zeus, Hamarium Athena and Aphrodite.
