= Valimitika =

Valimitika Βαλιμίτικα
- Community
- Location within Greece
- Coordinates: 38°14′N 22°08′E
- Country: Greece
- Administrative region: West Greece
- Regional unit: Achaea
- Municipality: Aigialeia
- Municipal unit: Aigio

Population (2021)
  - Community: 457
- Time zone: UTC+2 (EET)
  - Summer (DST): UTC+3 (EEST)

Valimitika (Greek: Βαλιμίτικα) is a village in the municipal unit of Aigio, Achaea, Greece. It is situated at the outflow of the river Selinountas into the Gulf of Corinth, 5 km east of Aigio. The railway from Corinth to Patras passes through the village.

== Population ==
Year	Population
1981	526
1991	550
2001	510
2011	575
2021	457

== See also ==
- List of settlements in Achaea
