= Dimitrios Meletopoulos =

Greek revolutionary leader and politician

- Δημήτριος Μελετόπουλος
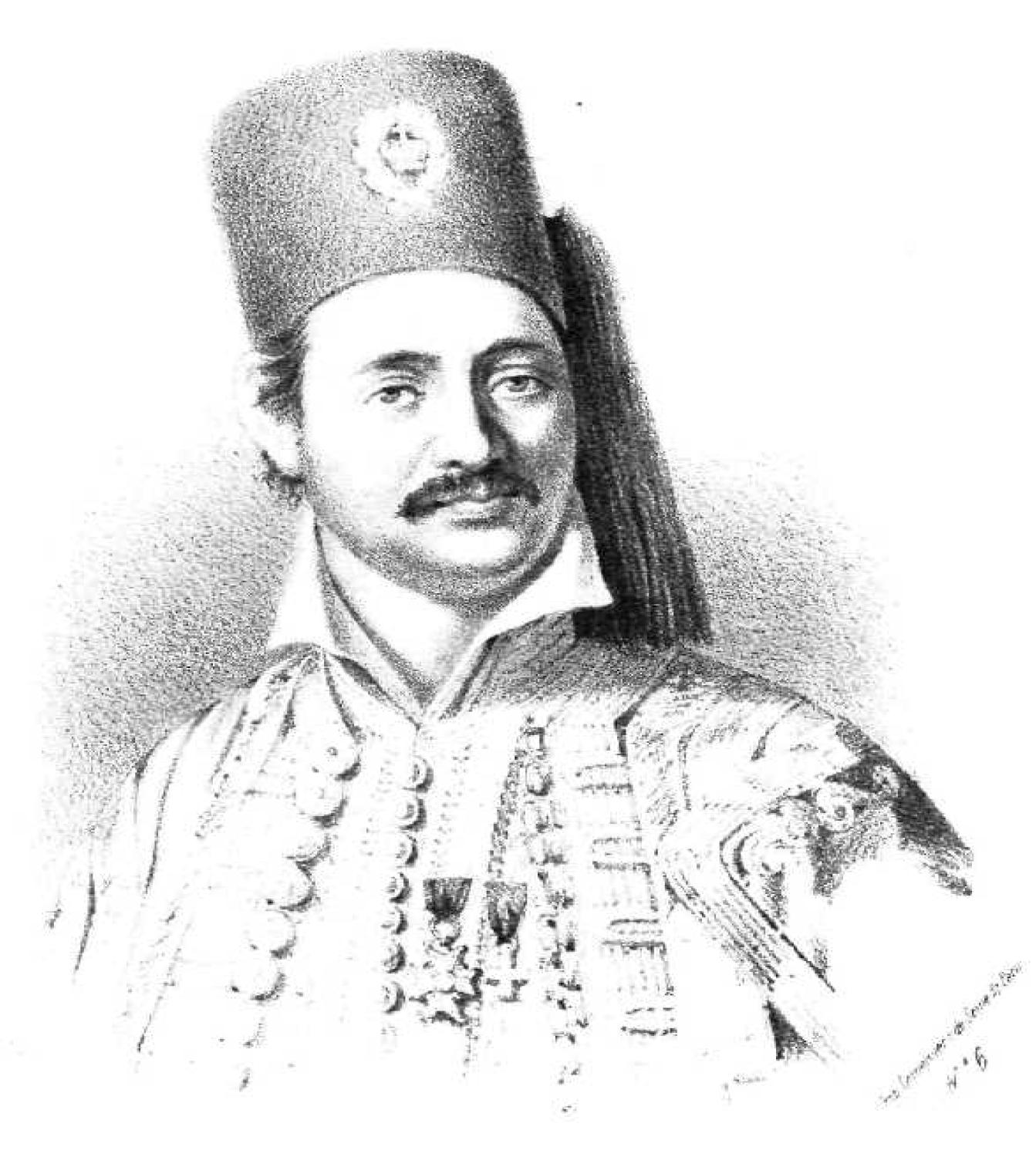
- A portrait of Dimitrios Meletopoulos

Minister of the Interior
- Monarch: Otto

Minister of Military Affairs
- Incumbent
- Assumed office 1851
- Monarch: Otto
- Prime Minister: Antonios Kriezis

Personal details
- Born: c. 1796 Vostitsa, Morea Eyalet, Ottoman Empire (now Aigio, Greece)
- Died: 1858 Athens, Kingdom of Greece
- Children: Leonidas Meletopoulos; Angelos Meletopoulos; Charilaos Meletopoulos
- Occupation: Revolutionary; Soldier; Politician
- Awards: Order of the Redeemer

Military service
- Allegiance: First Hellenic Republic; Kingdom of Greece
- Branch/service: Hellenic Army
- Years of service: 1821-1858
- Rank: General (Revolutionary Army); Lieutenant General (Hellenic Army)
- Battles/wars: Greek War of Independence; Siege of Patras; Battle of Dervenakia; Greek Civil Wars

Dimitrios Meletopoulos (Greek: Δημήτριος Μελετόπουλος, Aigio, c. 1796 – Athens, 1858) was a Greek revolutionary leader of the Greek War of Independence and later a politician.

== Biographical information ==
Meletopoulos was born in Vostitsa (Aigio) and was one of the six children of Aggelis Meletopoulos and Anastasia Charalampi. His grandfather was Christodoulos Meletopoulos, a notable who actively participated in the Orlov Revolt of 1770. Before 1821, Dimitrios Meletopoulos worked as a raisin merchant. He became member of Filiki Eteria in 1819 through his father, who served in Constantinople as vekil and participated in the assembly of Vostitsa. Together with Andreas Londos and Leontas Messinezis, the younger Meletopoulos supported the proposal of Papaflessas for the immediate start of the Revolution.

During the Revolution he initially supported the Londos family. On 26 March 1821 he seized Vostitsa from the Ottomans. He also participated in the battles of Patras, in the repelling of the army of Dramali Pasha and in the military operations in Central Greece. He eventually rose to head his own military force and in 1823 he was appointed a lieutenant general.

During the Greek civil wars of 1823–25, although initially he took the side of Londos, he shifted to support the government faction of Georgios Kountouriotis. In 1824 he was promoted to general. Later, he participated in the operations against the army of Ibrahim Pasha of Egypt, and the subjugation of the regions of the Peloponnese that had surrendered to the Ottomans.

Meletopoulos participated actively in the Third and Fifth National assemblies in the following years. He continued in politics in the independent Greek state, where he was elected as mayor of Aigio. He was appointed as Minister of the Interior, Minister of Military Affairs, and twice served as prefect of the Attica and Boeotia Prefecture.

During the reign of King Otto of Greece, Meletopoulos was appointed lieutenant general in the regular army. He died in 1858 in Athens from apoplexy (or stroke). At the end of his life, he was destitute. From his marriage to a daughter of Anagnostis Deligiannis, he had three sons: Leonidas, Angelos and Charilaos.
