= Konstantinos Kanellopoulos =

Greek Navy officer

Konstantinos Kanellopoulos (Greek: Κωνσταντίνος Κανελλόπουλος) was a Greek Navy officer who reached the rank of rear admiral.

He was born in 1872, the nephew of the notable naval officer and educator Ilias Kanellopoulos. He joined the Royal Hellenic Navy as an ensign in 1890, and fought in the Greco-Turkish War of 1897 and the Balkan Wars of 1912–13. He retired with the rank of rear admiral on 10/23 May 1920.

His older brother, Filippos, also became a naval officer and reached the rank of vice admiral.
