= Xenophon of Aegium =

Xenophon of Aegium (Ξενοφών ο Αιγιεύς) may refer to two ancient Olympians from Aegium (now Aigio), winners and two at another games.

1. Xenophon of Aegium, the elder, winner of the 100th Olympic Games and 380 BC at another games.
2. Xenophon of Aegium, the younger, winner of the 180th Olympic Games and at 60 BC at the other games
