= Ladas of Aegium =

Ladas (Ancient Greek: Λάδας) of Aegium was an ancient Greek athlete listed by Eusebius of Caesarea as a victor in the stadion race of the 125th Olympiad (280 BC).

== See also ==
- Olympic winners of the Stadion race
