= Selinus (Laconia) =

Coordinates: 37°01′30″N 22°40′59″E

Selinus or Selinous (Ancient Greek: Σελινοῦς) was a village in the north of ancient Laconia, described by Pausanias as 20 stadia from Geronthrae; but as Pausanias seems not to have visited this part of Laconia, the distances may not be correct.

Its site is located northwest the modern Geraki.
