= Selinus (Sporades) =

Ancient town on Peparethus

Coordinates: 39°10′15″N 23°36′44″E

Selinus or Selinous (Ancient Greek: Σελινοῦς) was an ancient town on the Sporadic island of Peparethus (modern Skopelos).

Its site is located near Klima.
