= Selinountas (river) =

River in Achaea, Peloponnese, Greece

- Native name: Σελινούντας (Greek)

Location
- Country: Greece

Physical characteristics
- Source
  - location: Achaea
- Mouth
  - location: Gulf of Corinth near Aigio
  - coordinates: 38°13′40″N 22°8′57″E
- Length: 47.8 km (29.7 mi)

The Selinountas (Greek: Σελινούντας, Ancient Greek: Σελινοῦς, romanized: Selinous, Latin: Selinus) is a river in Achaea, Greece. It is 47.8 km (29.7 mi) long. Its source is on Mount Erymanthos, near the village Kato Vlasia in southern Achaea. It flows in generally northeastern direction, through the municipalities Kalavryta and Aigialeia. It flows into the Gulf of Corinth in the village Valimitika, near the town Aigio.
