= Mageiras =

Mageiras Μάγειρας
- Community
- Location within Greece
- Coordinates: 38°15′N 21°58′E
- Country: Greece
- Administrative region: West Greece
- Regional unit: Achaea
- Municipality: Aigialeia
- Municipal unit: Sympoliteia

Population (2021)
  - Community: 37
- Time zone: UTC+2 (EET)
  - Summer (DST): UTC+3 (EEST)
- Vehicle registration: ΑΧ

Mageiras (Greek: Μάγειρας) is a mountain village in the municipal unit of Sympoliteia, Achaea, Greece. It is located in the eastern foothills of the Panachaiko, 2 km south of Arravonitsa, 8 km southwest of Rododafni and 10 km west of Aigio.

== Population ==
| Year | Population |
|---|---|
| 1830 | 19 families |
| 1844 | 52 |
| 1851 | 56 |
| 1861 | 71 |
| 1879 | 88 |
| 1889 | 100 |
| 1896 | 122 |
| 1907 | 129 |
| 1920 | 149 |
| 1928 | 158 |
| 1940 | 138 |
| 1951 | 165 |
| 1961 | 153 |
| 1971 | 76 |
| 1981 | 74 |
| 1991 | 76 |
| 2001 | 81 |
| 2011 | 55 |
| 2021 | 37 |

== History ==
Mageiras was founded between 1750 and 1770 by residents of the large village Tsetsevos which suffered from landslides at the time. Landslides also hit Mageiras in the 1930s. Mageiras was part of the municipality of Erineos from 1845 until 1912, of the community of Myrovrysi until 1919 and of the community of Aragozena until 1924. Mageiras was an independent community until 1997, when it became a part of the newly formed municipality of Sympoliteia.

== See also ==
- List of settlements in Achaea
