= Longos, Achaea =

Longos Λόγγος
- Settlement
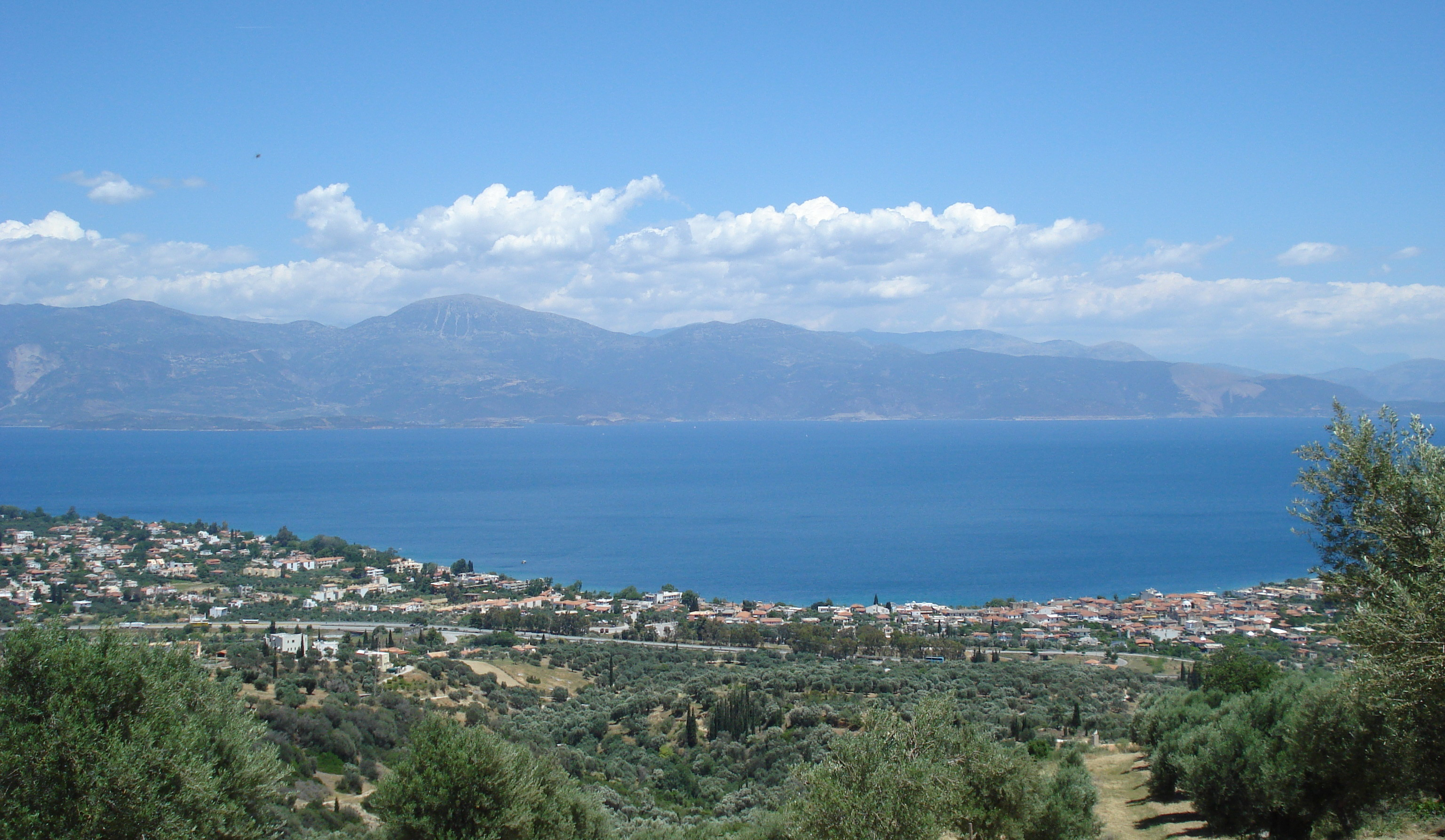
- Panoramic view of Selianitika and Longos

- Location within Greece
- Coordinates: 38°17′38″N 22°1′17″E
- Country: Greece
- Administrative region: Western Greece
- Regional unit: Achaea
- Municipality: Aigialeia
- Municipal unit: Sympoliteia
- Elevation: 10 m (33 ft)

Population (2021)
  - Community: 782
- Time zone: UTC+2 (EET)
  - Summer (DST): UTC+3 (EEST)
- Postal code: 25 100
- Area code: 26910
- Vehicle registration: AX, AZ

Longos (Greek: Λόγγος) is a village in the municipality of Aigialeia in the northeastern part of Achaea in the Peloponnese, Greece. The villages Longos and Selianitika (adjacent to the southeast) share a beautiful beach on the Gulf of Corinth which is approximately 1.5 km long. Both villages are among the most popular summer destinations of Achaea. Longos is 2 km east of Kamares, 4 km northwest of Rododafni and 7 km northwest of Aigio. The Greek National Road 8A (Athens - Corinth - Patras) runs southwest of the village.

== Historical population ==
Year	Population
1981	811
1991	729
2001	623
2011	659
2021	782

== Sports ==
The "Longos Football Field" is located in the southwestern side of Longos village near Foinikas River. Longos historical football team, "Aris Longou", used to be the pride of the natives due to the participation in the First Local Division. Aris Longou produced skilled football players such as Giannis Baltimas - former Panachaiki goalkeeper who participated in the Greek Super League. Longos sport activities include also 5x5 football fields and a basketball court.

== See also ==
- List of settlements in Achaea

== Sources ==
- Christos Koryllos Chorography of Greece, Athens, 1903
