= Erineus =

Erineus or Erineos may refer to:

- a synonym for the rove beetles genus Clidicus
- Erineos (Ερινεός), a municipality in northeastern Achaea, Greece
- Erineus (city), one of the four Greek cities of the Doric Tetrapolis
- Erineus (Achaea), a town of ancient Achaea, Greece
- Erineus (Thessaly), a town of ancient Thessaly, Greece
- the ancient name for the river Erineo in Sicily, south of Syracuse
