= Erineos =

Erineos Ερινεός
- Municipal unit
- Location within the regional unit

- Location within Greece
- Coordinates: 38°18′N 22°0′E
- Country: Greece
- Administrative region: West Greece
- Regional unit: Achaea
- Municipality: Aigialeia

Area
  - Municipal unit: 98.71 km^{2} (38.11 sq mi)
- Elevation: 154 m (505 ft)

Population (2021)
  - Municipal unit: 2,890
  - Municipal unit density: 29.3/km^{2} (75.8/sq mi)
- Time zone: UTC+2 (EET)
  - Summer (DST): UTC+3 (EEST)
- Postal code: 250 09
- Area code: 26910
- Vehicle registration: ΑΧ
- Website: www.erineos.gr

Erineos (Greek: Ερινεός) is a former municipality in Achaea, West Greece, Greece. Since the 2011 local government reform it is part of the municipality Aigialeia, of which it is a municipal unit. The municipal unit has an area of 98.710 km^{2}. Its seat of administration was in the village of Lampiri. Erineos stretches between the northeastern slopes of the Panachaiko mountain and the Gulf of Corinth. The river Foinikas (Phoenix) (or Salmenikos) flows through the municipality. The Greek National Road 8A (Patras - Aigio - Corinth) and the railway from Patras to Corinth run through the municipal unit. It is located about 10 km west of Aigio.

== Subdivisions ==
The municipal unit Erineos is subdivided into the following communities (constituent villages in brackets):

- Arravonitsa (Arravonitsa, Synania)
- Damakini (Damakini, Vounopyrgos)
- Kamares (Kamares, Bouka, Pefka)
- Neos Erineos
- Salmeniko (Ano Salmeniko, Kato Salmeniko, Voteni, Neo Salmeniko)
- Ziria (Ziria, Ano Ziria, Kyani Akti, Lampiri, Rodini, Sarkounas)

== Historical population ==
Year	Population
1991	3,683
2001	3,768
2011	3,236
2021	2,890

== History ==
In Ancient Greece, the area around Ziria was part of the Achaean League. Today's Lampiri was the port of the ancient town of Erineus, which was destroyed in 412 BC by Athenian and Corinthian generals. The English antiquarian and topographer William Martin Leake travelled in the area in the first half of the 19th century. In his book "Peloponnesiaca: A Supplement to Travels in the Moréa" he mentions the village as the "vineyards of Lambíri" and the bay of Lambiri as "the only semblance of a harbor between Aigio and Psathopyrgos." The famous French historian, explorer, and diplomat François Pouqueville, who travelled through the area in 1816, mentions the "Port Erineus or "Lambir ta Ambélia" (ampelia means vineyards in Greek), and he also mentions the existence of a khan for travellers there.

The ancient city of Rhypes was one of the cities of the Achaean League. It was razed by Emperor Augustus. In Kamares artefacts dating back to the Roman times have been found. The Salmeniko Castle was an important stronghold of the Byzantines against the Ottomans. The municipality Erineos was founded in 1994 and included the former communes of Kamares, Neos Erineos and Ziria. In 1998 under the Capodistrian Constitution Arravonitsa, Damakini and Salmeniko were added.
