= Foinikas (river) =

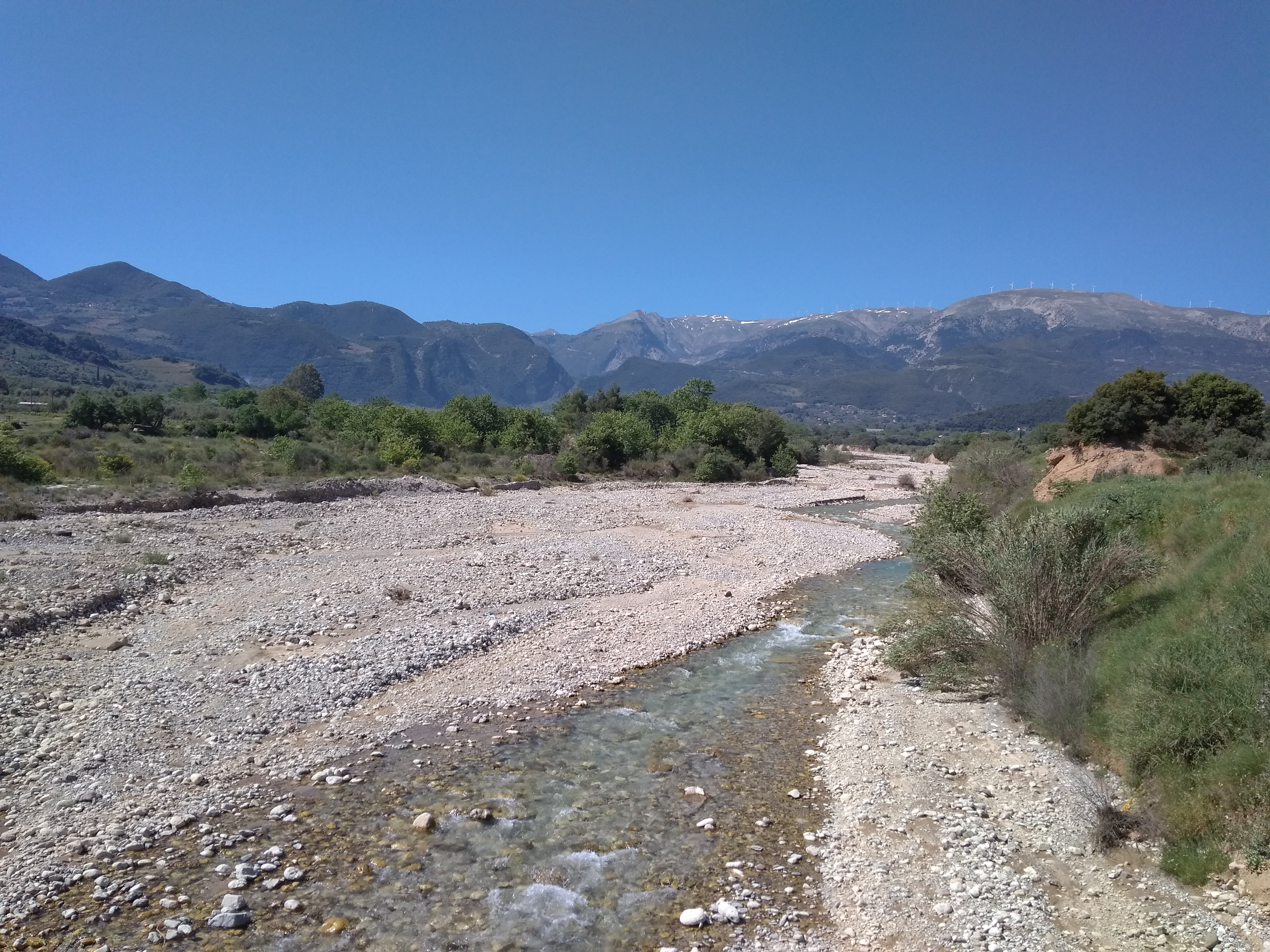
- Foinikas near the village of Neo Salmeniko. In the background the mountain Panachaiko.

Location
- Country: Greece

Physical characteristics
- Source
  - location: Panachaiko
- Mouth
  - location: Gulf of Corinth
  - coordinates: 38.3097°N 22.0190°E
- Length: 22.8 km (14.2 mi)

The river Foinikas (Greek: Φοίνικας, Ancient Greek: Φοίνιξ), also known as the Salmenikos River (Σαλμένικος), is a river in northern Peloponnese, Greece. Its source is on the north-eastern slopes of Mount Panachaiko, near the village of Vounopirgos (Loubista). It flows into the Gulf of Corinth, between the villages of Longos and Kamares. Major tributaries are Kloumenitis (intermittent stream) and Stachtaina (intermittent stream). The total length of the river is 22.8 kilometres (14.2 mi) and it flows along the following places, from the source downstream: Damakini, Salmenikο, Kamares. Foinikas is an intermittent river that has a continuous flow in all its length from October to June every year (during years of normal rainfall). Close to the sources, the river has a yearly flow but during the summer months, the water is used for agriculture.

== History ==
The river is mentioned by the ancient Greek geographer Pausanias in the seventh volume of his Description of Greece. He mentions the river as a landmark for the ancient city of Aigio: "The territory of Aegium (Aigio) is crossed by a river Phoenix, and by another called Meganitas, both of which flow into the sea". In 1874 the researcher and chronicler Archduke Ludwig Salvator of Austria did a research trip by boat in the Gulf of Corinth and he wrote a detailed book with his observations for the landscape and the populated places of the northern Peloponnese. He names the river Foinikas as "Salmenikiotikos potamos" (meaning river that comes from Salmeniko).

== Gallery ==
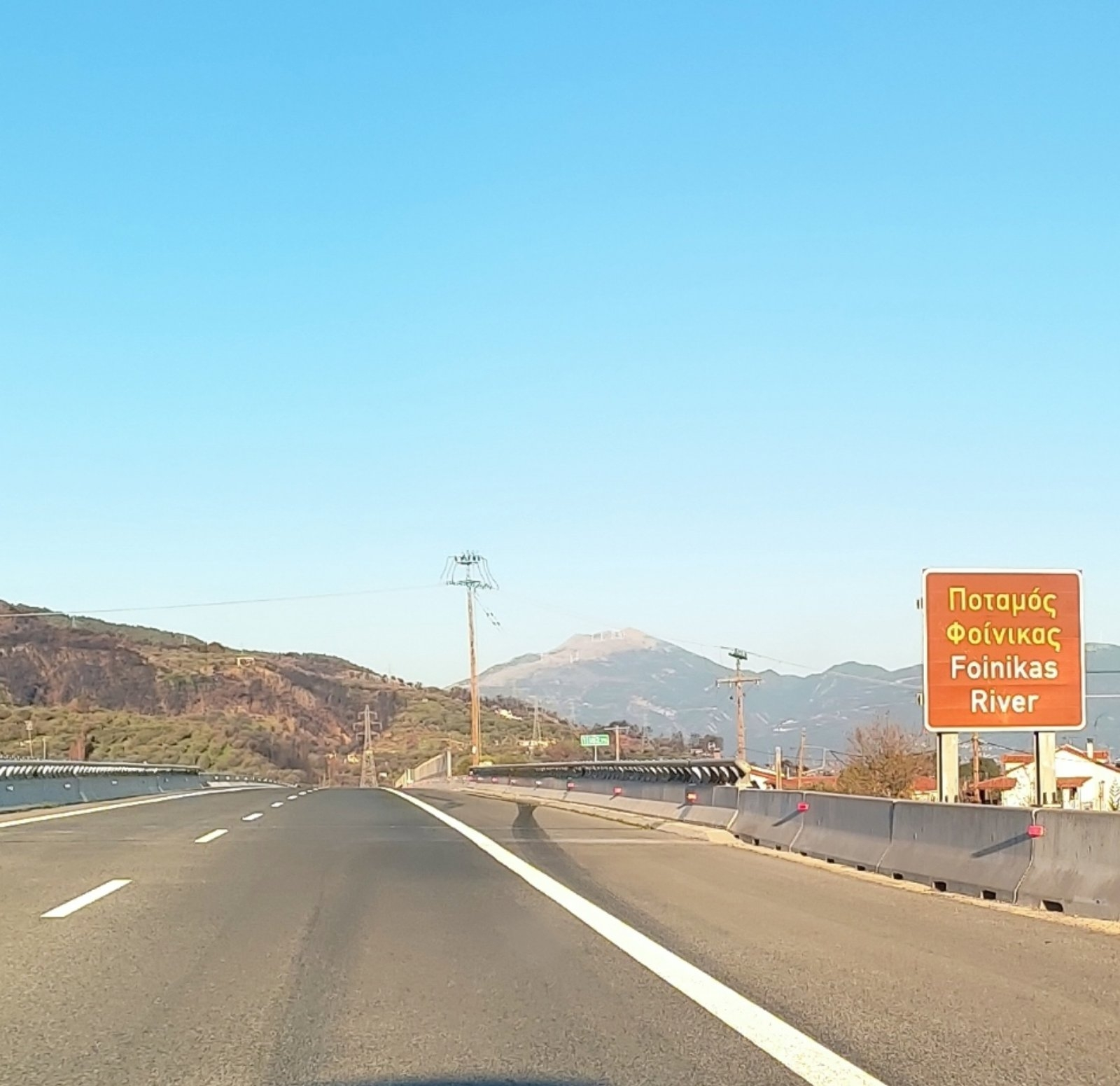
Road sign with the inscription "Foinikas River" (On the Olympia Odos highway bridge over the river)

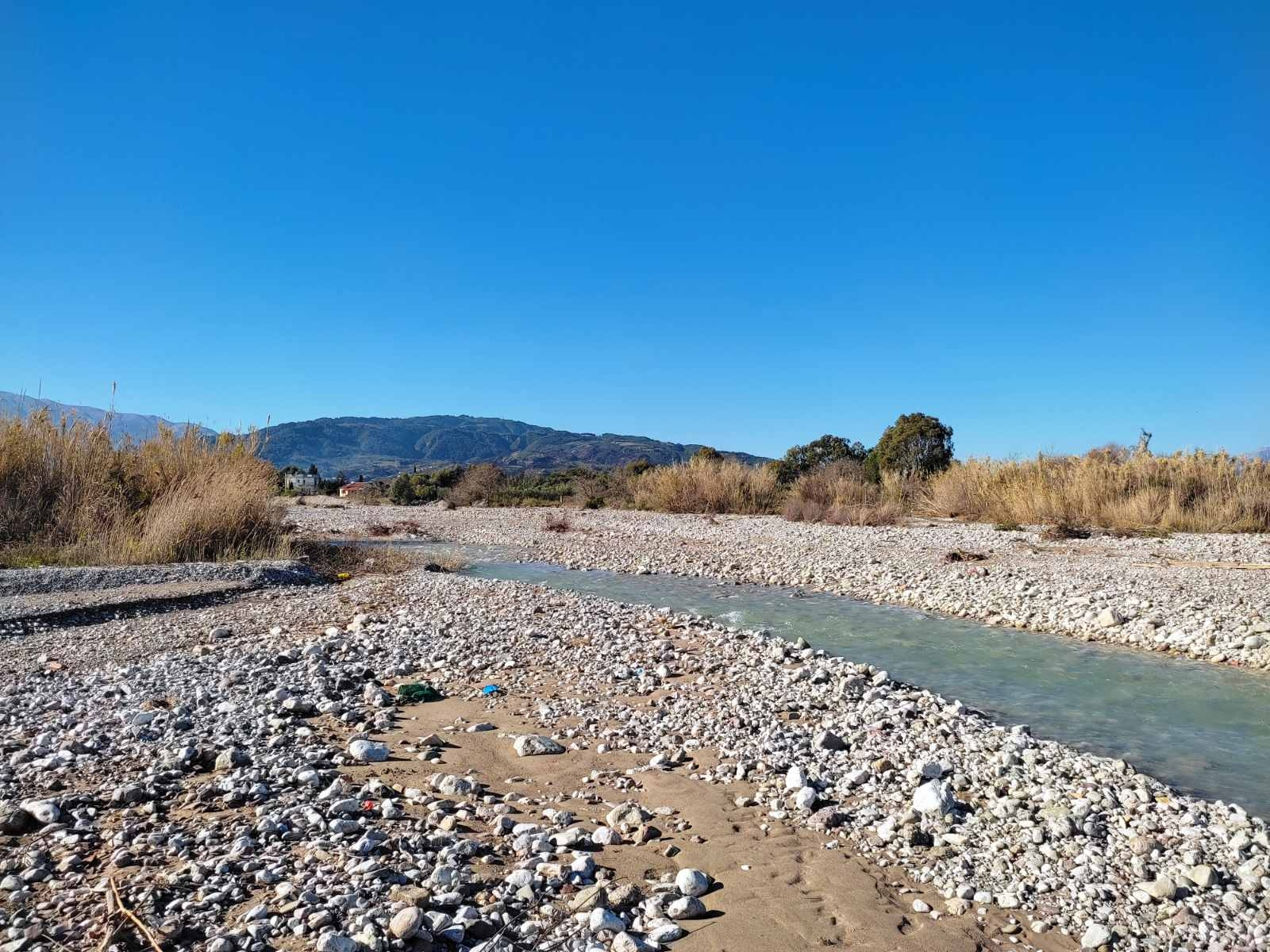
The estuary of the river Foinikas. Partial view (January 2022)

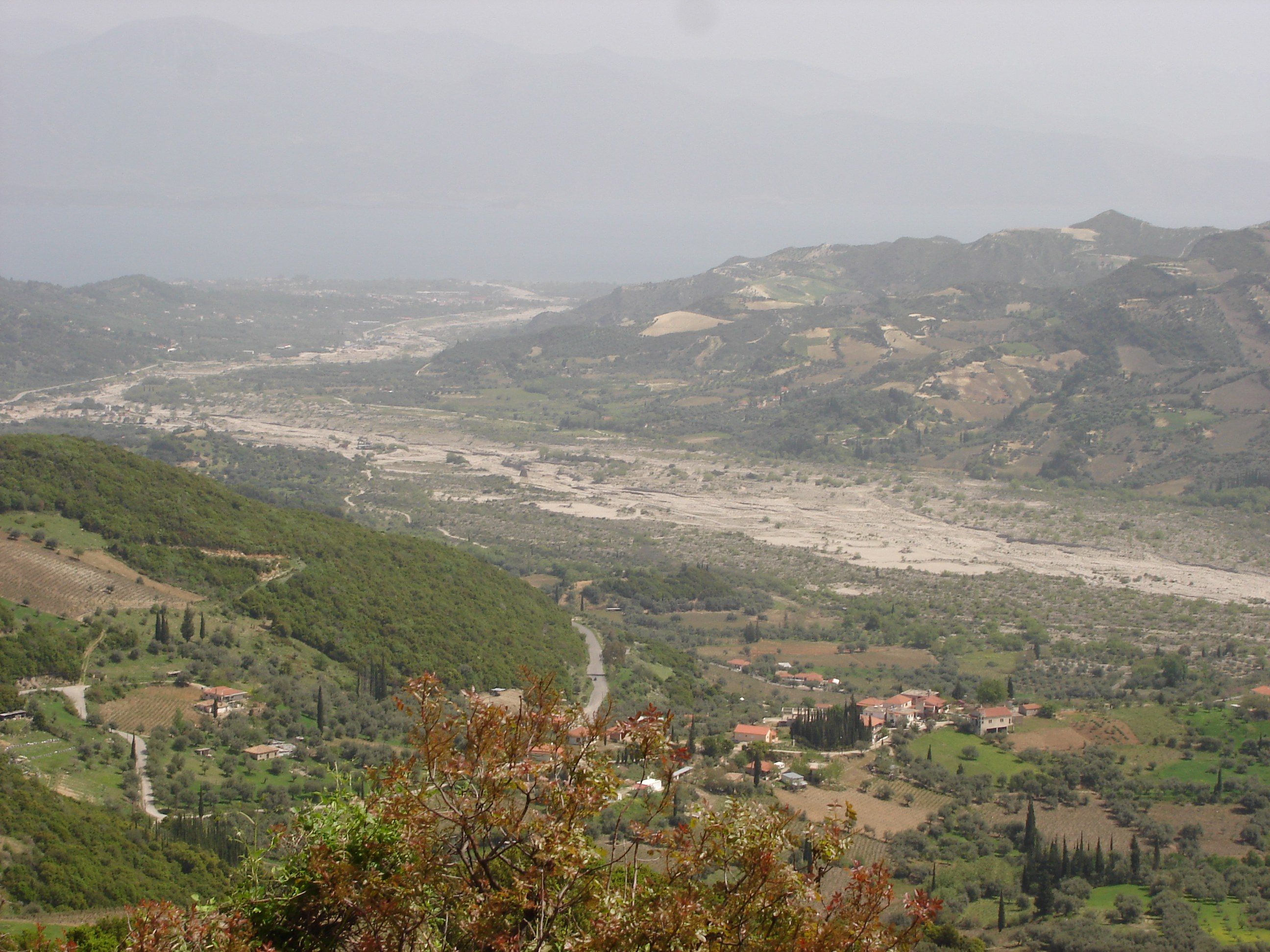
River Foinikas as seen from mount Panachaiko
