= Myrovrysi =

Myrovrysi Μυρόβρυση
- Community
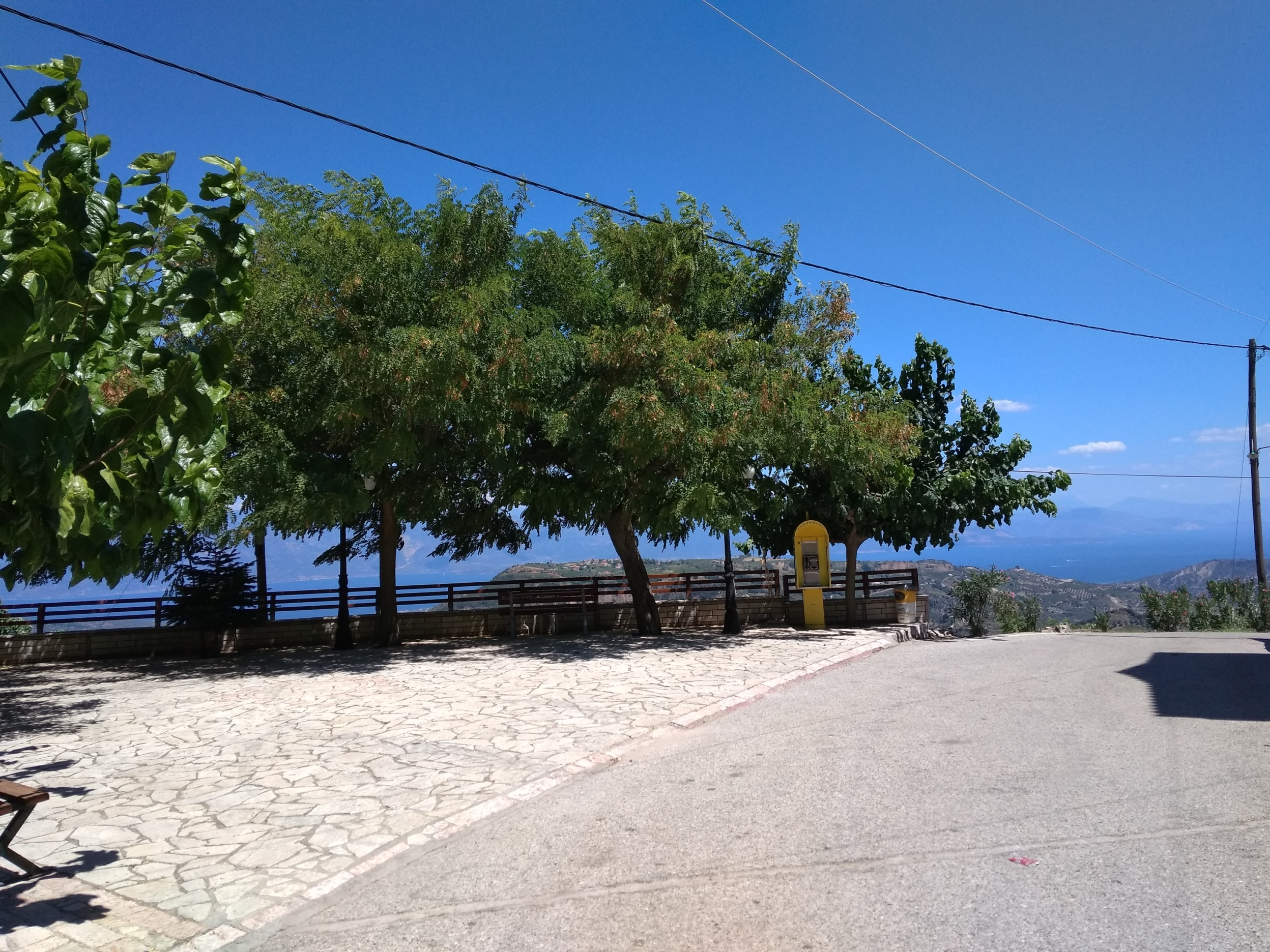
- The small square in the centre of the village

- Location within Greece
- Coordinates: 38°14′N 21°57′E
- Country: Greece
- Administrative region: West Greece
- Regional unit: Achaea
- Municipality: Aigialeia
- Municipal unit: Sympoliteia
- Elevation: 600 m (2,000 ft)

Population (2021)
  - Community: 175
- Time zone: UTC+2 (EET)
  - Summer (DST): UTC+3 (EEST)
- Vehicle registration: ΑΧ,ΑΖ

Myrovrysi (Greek: Μυρόβρυση) is a mountain village in the municipality of Aigialeia, Achaea, Greece. It is located in the eastern foothills of the Panachaiko, 11 km south of Selianitika and 44.3 Km east of Patras. In 2021, it had a population of 175.

The climate is Mediterranean. The average temperature is 14 °C. The warmest month is July, at 27 °C, and the coldest is February, at 4 °C. The average annual rainfall is 910 millimeters. The wettest month is February, with 150 millimeters of rain, and the driest is June, with 31 millimeters.
