= Archias of Corinth =

Mythological founder of Syracuse, Sicily

Archias (Ancient Greek: Ἀρχίας) was a Corinthian aristocrat of the 8th century BC. According to an ancient legend, following a serious dispute in his native Corinth, he left the city and, acting on instructions from the Oracle of Delphi, led a group of colonists to southern Italy. Around 756 BC or 733 BC, he founded the city of Syracuse.

== Ancient accounts ==
According to Plutarch (1st c. AD), Archias was forced to leave Corinth after causing the death of Actaeon. Having fallen in love with him, Archias attempted to abduct Actaeon from the house of his father, Melissus, but a struggle broke out and Actaeon was killed in the ensuing violence. When Melissus failed to obtain justice for his son's death, he took his own life, calling down a curse of Poseidon upon the Corinthians. A plague subsequently struck Corinth, and, on the instruction of the Delphic oracle, Archias was compelled to go into exile.

Plutarch's narrative gives particular weight to the authority of the oracle and underscores the broader role of Delphi in the Corinthian colonisation of Syracuse, for which antiquity preserved two foundation oracles. One oracle reports a shared prophecy given to Archias and Myscellus, founder of Crotone, in which the god asked them to choose between wealth and health: Archias chose wealth and founded Syracuse, while Myscellus chose health and founded Croton. Another oracle is recorded by Pausanias (2nd c. AD), but without relating it to Myscellus and the foundation of Croton.

Plutarch reports that Archias gave birth to two daughters in Syracuse and was eventually killed in Sicily by his lover Telephos.

== Family and origin ==
The Parian Marble mentions Archias as the son of Euagetes.

From the time Archias, son of Euagetes being tenth from Temenus, led the

settlement from Corinth [and founded] Syracu[se … years], when Aeschylus

w[a]s [k]ing of Athens in his twenty-first year.

— Parian Marble, FGrHist 239 A 31, transl. A. Rotstein

Most modern scholars, following Edward Augustus Freeman, regard Archias as a member of the Bacchiad noble family, the aristocratic family that dominated Corinth until the rise of Cypselus in the 7th century BC. This affiliation, however, is not explicitly stated in the ancient sources.

A minority of scholars, relying primarily on a passage of the Parian Marble describing Archias as "tenth from Temenus", have instead argued for an Argive origin. This interpretation was challenged by Felix Jacoby, who rejected the wording of the Marble as erroneous and proposed emending it to "eleventh from Heracles", thereby removing the Argive affiliation; his correction has been widely accepted in modern scholarship. More recently, Andreas Morakis, has questioned the Bacchiadic attribution itself, arguing that it rests on a modern assumption that archaic colonisation was directed by polis authorities. He maintains that the foundation of Syracuse was not a state-led Bacchiadic enterprise, but an expedition undertaken by Archias as a Heracleid aristocrat outside the Bacchiads, who left Corinth in search of political authority they were denied at home.

== Interpretations ==
The motif of Actaeon's abduction by Archias echoes practices attested in archaic aristocratic and military Greek society. Strabo, citing a passage of Ephorus, describes the organisation of the Cretan agela, which may have served as a model for other Doric communities. In this context, the tradition of ritualised kidnapping may reflect a custom once practised in early Corinth.

The name Telephos evokes the mythical hero, son of Herakles, who in myth led the Greeks at Troy. According to tradition, this Telephos was suckled by a doe, killed his uncle during a hunt, and was subsequently driven into exile by an oracle, eventually finding purification in Mysia. The narrative thus reproduces the same pattern found in the story of Archias (and of Heracleid figures more generally) linking homicide, expulsion mandated by an oracle, and ritual purification.

== Historicity ==
As transmitted in the surviving narratives, the foundation of Syracuse and the figure Archias appear to belong primarily to the realm of myth rather than to that of historical record. The establishment of the colony is presented as a consequence of Archias's guilt toward Actaeon and may be understood as a typical example of the multiple mythic elaborations that developed around colonial foundations. The strong emphasis placed on the role of the founder may also reflect a later phase during which arose a need to provide colonial foundations with a prestigious origin through the exaltation of a heroic oikist (founder).

Modern scholarship has tended to downplay the historical value of such foundation traditions for the Greek West, viewing them as late constructions shaped by ideological or propagandistic concerns, and therefore lacking objective historical reliability. In particular, traditions centred on individual founders have often been interpreted as retrospective inventions, created to serve communal identity or political legitimacy.

At the same time, Antonella Carfora observes that Archias is attested early in an archaic poetic tradition. A fragment of Archilochus (7th century BC) cited by Athenaeus mentions Aithiops, a participant in the colonial expedition led by Archias to Sicily, who is said to have exchanged the land allotted to him in the new colony for a honey cake. Archilochus explicitly identifies Archias as the leader of the expedition and directly associates him with the foundation of Syracuse. This passage constitutes the earliest testimony relating to the foundation of the city and shows that Archias was already known in the first half of the 7th century BC. Carfora argues that while the ancient tradition surrounding Archias belongs to the realm of myths, it nevertheless preserves elements that are themselves archaic.
