= Selianitika =

Selianitika Σελιανίτικα
- Community
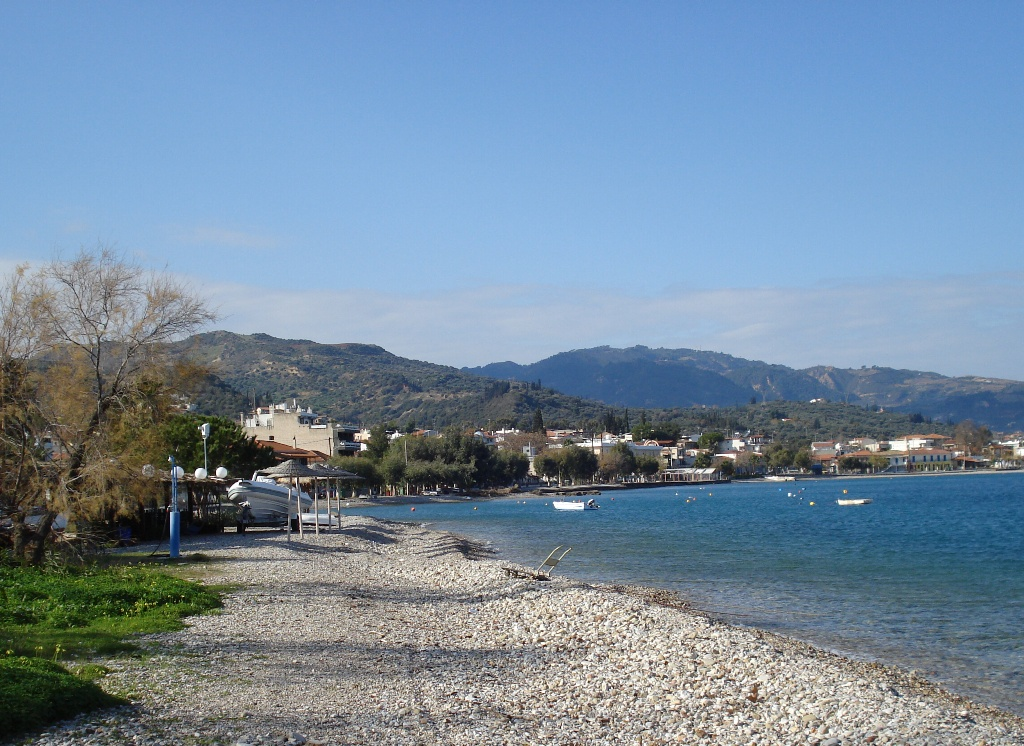
- Selianitika on a sunny day of winter

- Location within Greece
- Coordinates: 38°16′N 22°1′E
- Country: Greece
- Administrative region: Western Greece
- Regional unit: Achaea
- Municipality: Aigialeia
- Municipal unit: Sympoliteia

Area
  - Community: 2.8 km^{2} (1.1 sq mi)
- Elevation: 5 m (16 ft)

Population (2021)
  - Community: 856
  - Density: 310/km^{2} (790/sq mi)
- Time zone: UTC+2 (EET)
  - Summer (DST): UTC+3 (EEST)
- Postal code: 25 100
- Area code: 2691
- Vehicle registration: AX, AZ

Selianitika (Greek: Σελιανίτικα) is a coastal village in northern Achaea, Peloponnese, Greece. It is part of the municipal unit of Sympoliteia. It is located 6 km northwest of Aigio and 26 km east of Patras, at about 30m above sea level. The villages Selianitika and Longos (adjacent to the northwest) share a fine gravel beach on the Gulf of Corinth which is approximately 1.5 km long. Both villages are among the most popular summer destinations of Achaea.

The village had a population of 856 in 2021. The village is crossed by the Greek National Road 8 and has an interchange to the A8 motorway. In the new (under construction) railway line Athens-Kiato-Patras there will be a railway stop south of the village.

== Population ==
Year	Population
1981	814
1991	997
2001	1,147
2011	902
2021	856

== History ==
The name Selianitika is derived from the name of the village of Seliana. According to historian A. Fotopoulos, the descent of inhabitants of Seliana from the mountains to the coastal region of "Kryovrysi" near Aigio (where the village of Selianitika lies today) started to happen during the Ottoman period. Initially, the residents of Seliana were spending the winter in Selianitika and the summer in their village of Seliana but later they settled permanently. The residents of Seliana carried with them the parish of Saint Basil (the oldest of Seliana's churches) and today Saint Basil is the patron Saint of the village of Selianitika.

The French historian, explorer and diplomat François Pouqueville, who travelled through the area in 1816 does not mention Selianitika but mentions the small neighbouring village of Longos as the only being inhabited after he crossed the river of Phoenix (tholopotamos): "Une humble chapelle et le hameau de Longos sont les seuls lieux habités qu'on ait en vue du côté des montagnes". So probably the village was not yet built. In 1874 the researcher and chronicler Archduke Ludwig Salvator of Austria did a research trip by boat in the Gulf of Corinth and he wrote a detailed book with his observations for the landscape and the populated places of north Peloponnese. When he visited Selianitika he found two houses built beside the coast and around 50 stone-built houses with double-pitched roofs lying few meters away from the sea (where still lies still today the center of the village). He describes the church of Saint Basil as having an unfinished roof and he mentions the roughly shaped plaster iconostasis and the "stasidia" (church stalls of the greek orthodox church) inside the church. The village is described as having vineyards and plane trees. He also describes the existence of three water wells.

In the population census of 1879 (one of the earliest official documents mentioning the village), it had a population of 110 residents.

== Tourism ==
The village is one of the oldest tourist destinations in the region of Achaia. It was officially designated as a tourist site (τουριστικός τόπος) first by Royal decree 146/1961 in 1961 and later by Presidential decree 899/1976 in 1976. Selianitika has also mineral springs and a very small balneological bath spa. The spring was officially designated as a healing spring by the Greek Government in 1923. These sulphurous baths are recommended for diseases like arthritis and rheumatisms. As of 2013 the mineral springs are not accessible to the public.

== Gallery ==
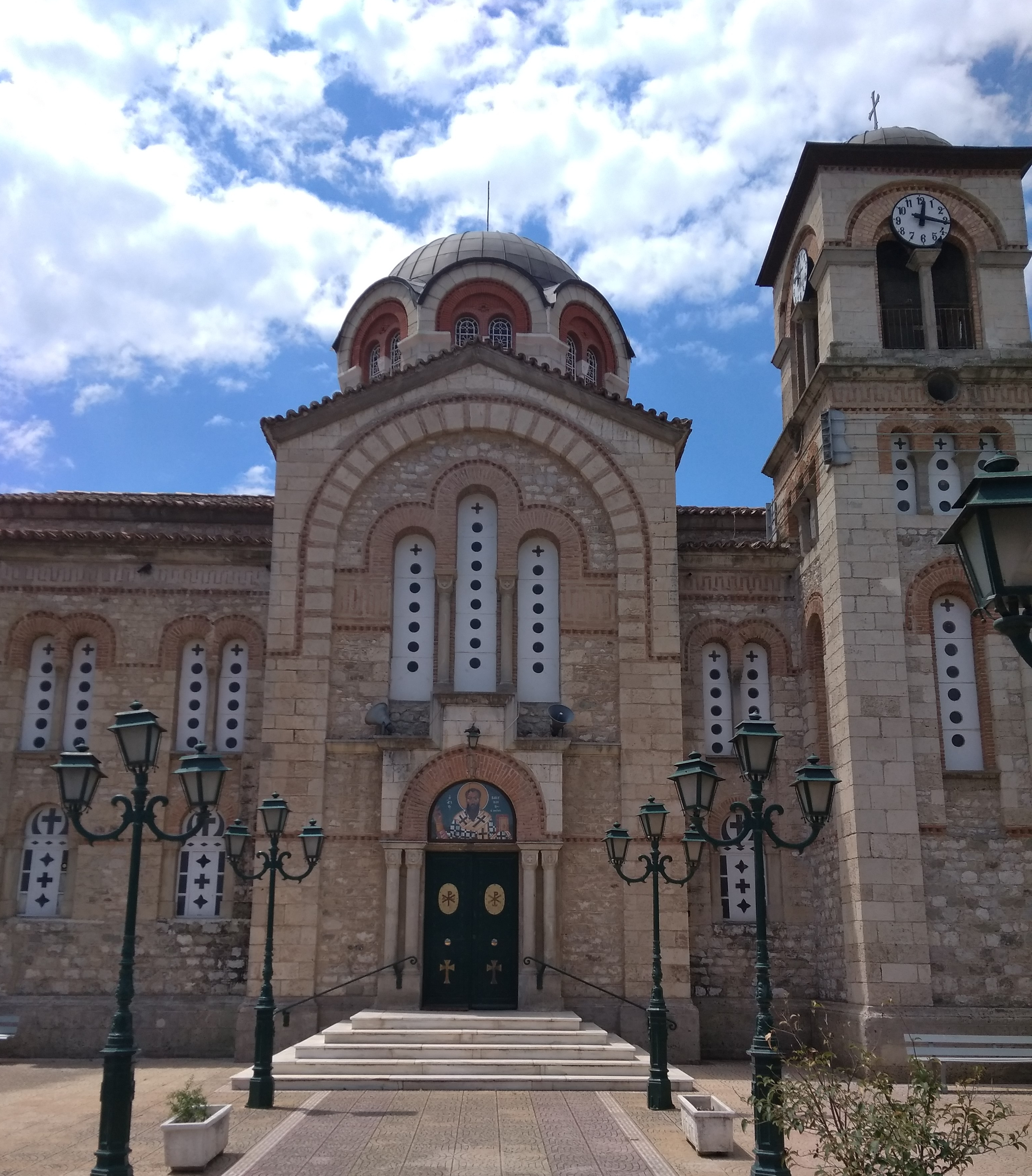
The stone-built church of Saint Basil in Selianitika (Summer 2018).

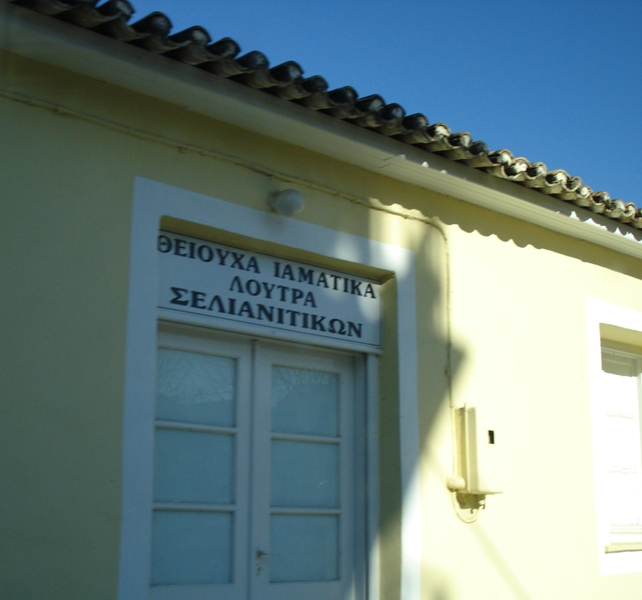
Medicinal sulphurous baths of Selianitika

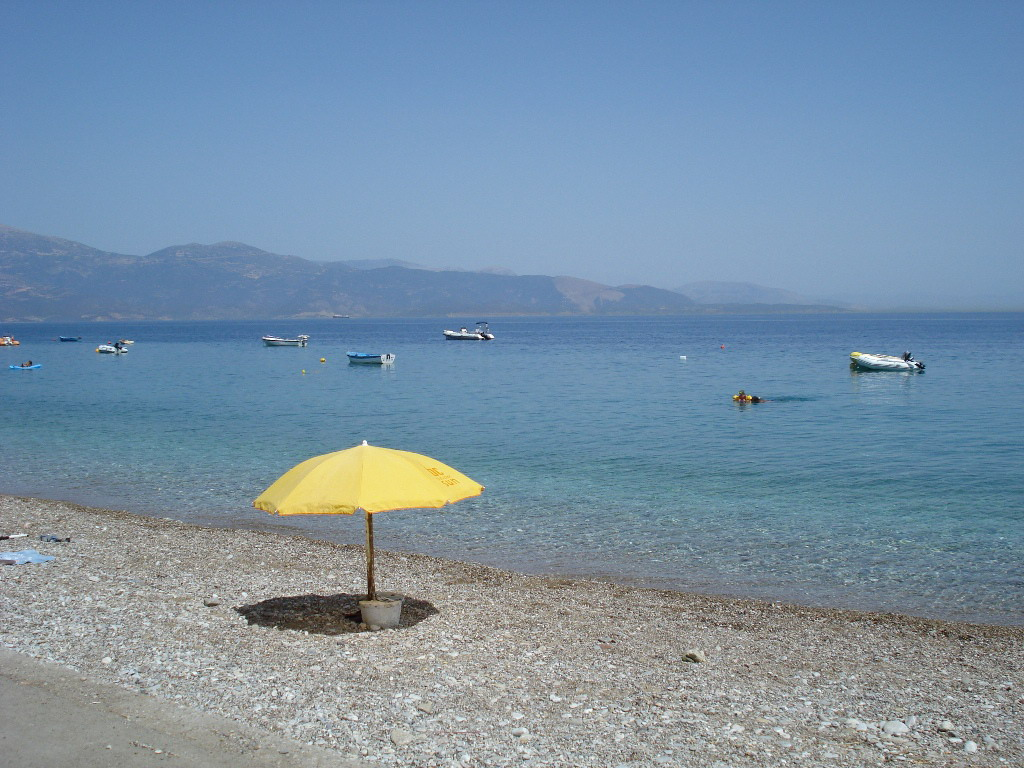
View of the fine gravel beach in the summer

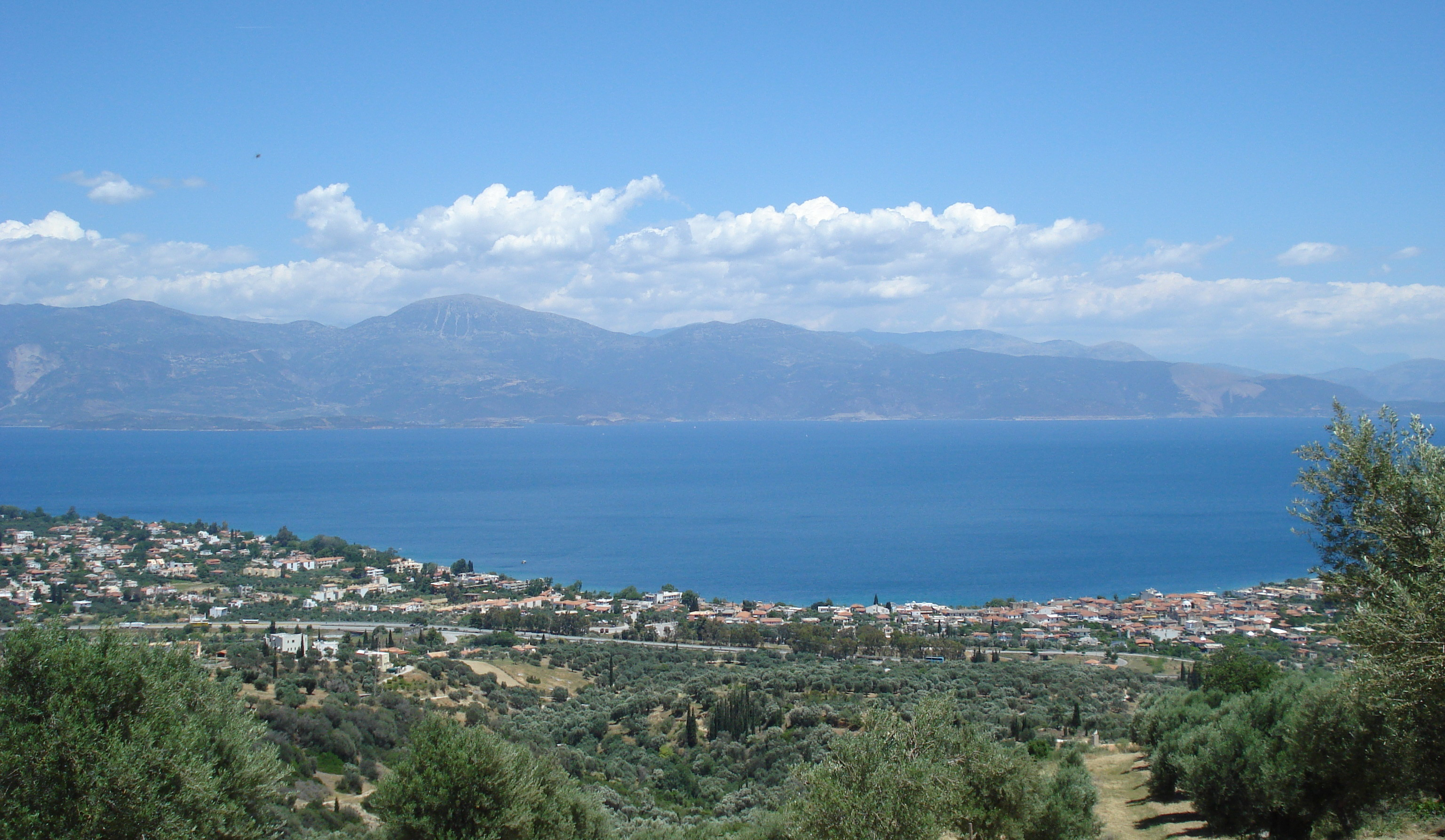
Panoramic view of Selianitika and Longos from the nearby hills

== See also ==
- List of settlements in Achaea

== Sources ==
- Αθ. Φωτόπουλος, "Ιστορικά και Λαογραφικά της Ανατολικής Αιγιάλειας και Καλαβρύτων", Αθήνα 1982 (In Greek)
- K. Baedeker, "Griechenland - Handbuch fuer Reisende", Leipzig, 1893 (In German)
