= Arravonitsa =

Arravonitsa Αρραβωνίτσα
- Community
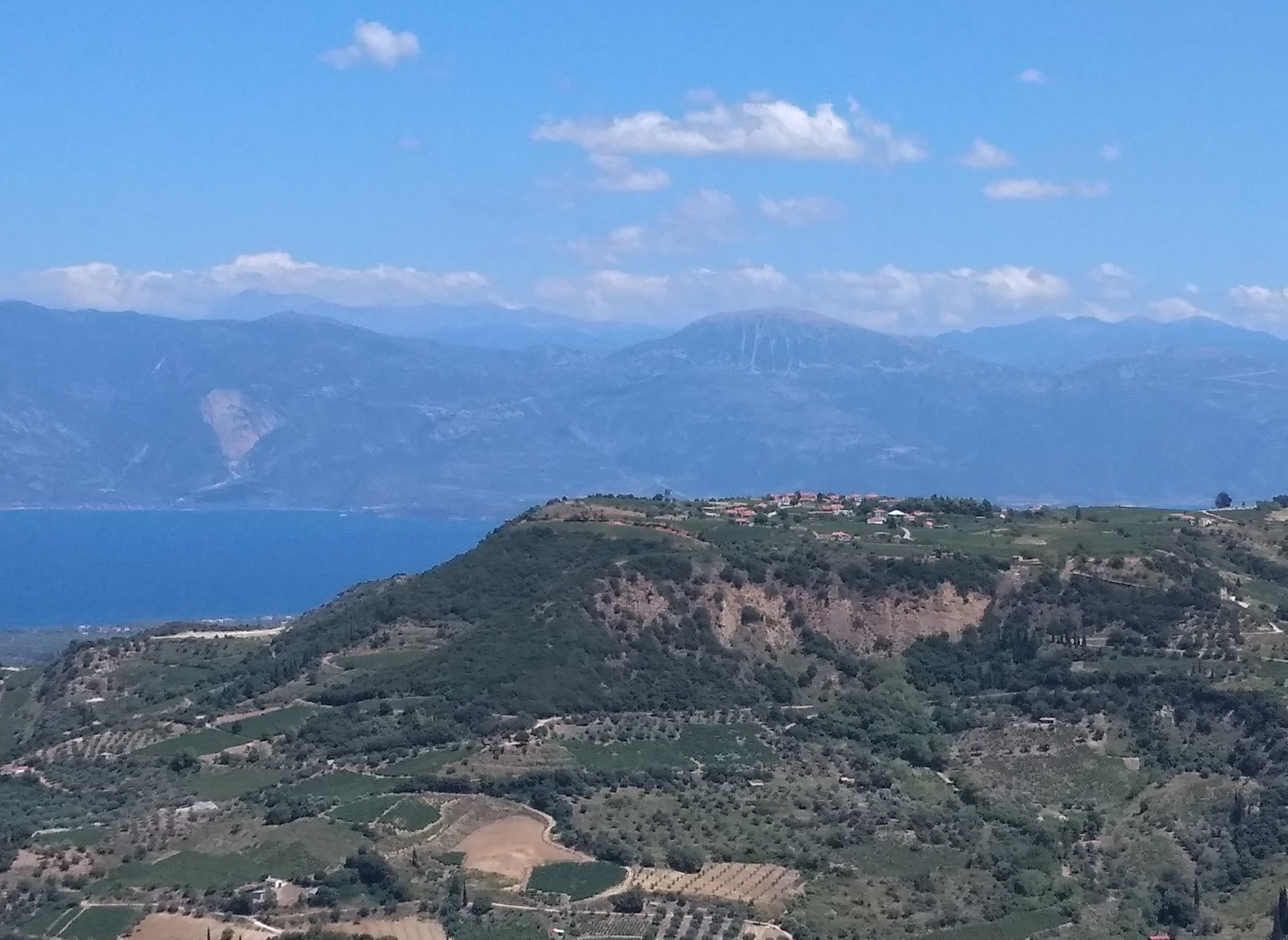
- The plateau and the village of Arravonitsa as seen from Myrovrysi.

- Location within Greece
- Coordinates: 38°15′N 21°58′E
- Country: Greece
- Administrative region: West Greece
- Regional unit: Achaea
- Municipality: Aigialeia
- Municipal unit: Erineos
- Village established: before 1692
- Elevation: 473 m (1,552 ft)

Population (2021)
  - Community: 136
- Time zone: UTC+2 (EET)
  - Summer (DST): UTC+3 (EEST)
- Postal code: 251 00
- Area code: 2691
- Vehicle registration: AX

Arravonitsa (Greek: Αρραβωνίτσα) is a village and a community in the municipal unit of Erineos, Achaea, Greece. It is located in a hilly area, 15 km west of Aigio. The community consists of the villages Arravonitsa and Synania.

== Population ==
Year	Population
1981	361
1991	362
2001	263
2011	189
2021	136

== See also ==
- List of settlements in Achaea
