= Phelloe =

Coordinates: 38°04′39″N 22°24′50″E

Phelloe (Ancient Greek: Φελλόη) was a fortified town and polis (city-state) of ancient Achaea, 40 stadia from Aegeira, through the mountains. According to the geographer Pausanias, it abounded in springs of water.

Its site is tentatively located near the modern Zacholi/Seliana.
