= Leuctrum =

Leuctrum or Leuktron may refer to:

- Leuctrum (Achaea), a town of ancient Achaea
- Leuctrum (Arcadia), a town of ancient Arcadia
- Leuctrum (Laconia), a town of ancient Laconia
