= Ziria =

Ziria may refer to:

- an alternative name for Mount Kyllini, southern Greece
- Ziria, Achaea, a village in Achaea, southern Greece
- Tengai Makyō: Ziria, a video game
