= Akoli =

Akoli may refer to:

- Akoli, Ghana
- Akoli, Greece, a beach area in the northern part of Achaea, Greece
- Akoli (stream), in Uganda
