= Ziria, Achaea =

Ziria Ζήρια
- Community
- Location within Greece
- Coordinates: 38°18′N 21°59′E
- Country: Greece
- Administrative region: West Greece
- Regional unit: Achaea
- Municipality: Aigialeia
- Municipal unit: Erineos

Population (2021)
  - Community: 769
- Time zone: UTC+2 (EET)
  - Summer (DST): UTC+3 (EEST)

Ziria (Greek: Ζήρια) is a village and a community in Achaea, Greece. It is situated in the hills near the Gulf of Corinth coast, 11 km northwest of Aigio. The community consists of the villages Ziria, Ano Ziria, Kyani Akti, Lampiri, Rodini and Sarkounas. Ziria is part of the municipal unit of Erineos. The community had a population of 769 in 2021. Until 1998, Ziria was an independent commune. It became part of Erineos under the 1998 Capodistrian Plan, and Erineos became part of Aigialeia through the 2011 Kallikratis reform.

== History ==
In ancient times, the area around Ziria was part of the Achaean League. Today's Lampiri was the port of the ancient town of Erineus, which was destroyed in 412 BC by Athenian and Corinthian generals. The English antiquarian and topographer William Martin Leake travelled in the area in the first half of the 19th century. In his book "Peloponnesiaca: A Supplement to Travels in the Moréa" he mentions the village as the "vineyards of Lambíri" and the bay of Lambiri as "the only semblance of a harbor between Aigio and Psathopyrgos." The famous French historian, explorer, and diplomat François Pouqueville, who travelled through the area in 1816, mentions the "Port Erineus or "Lambir ta Ambélia" (ampelia means vineyards in Greek), and he also mentions the existence of a khan for travellers there.

== See also ==
- List of settlements in Achaea
