= Seliana =

Seliana Σελιάνα
- Community
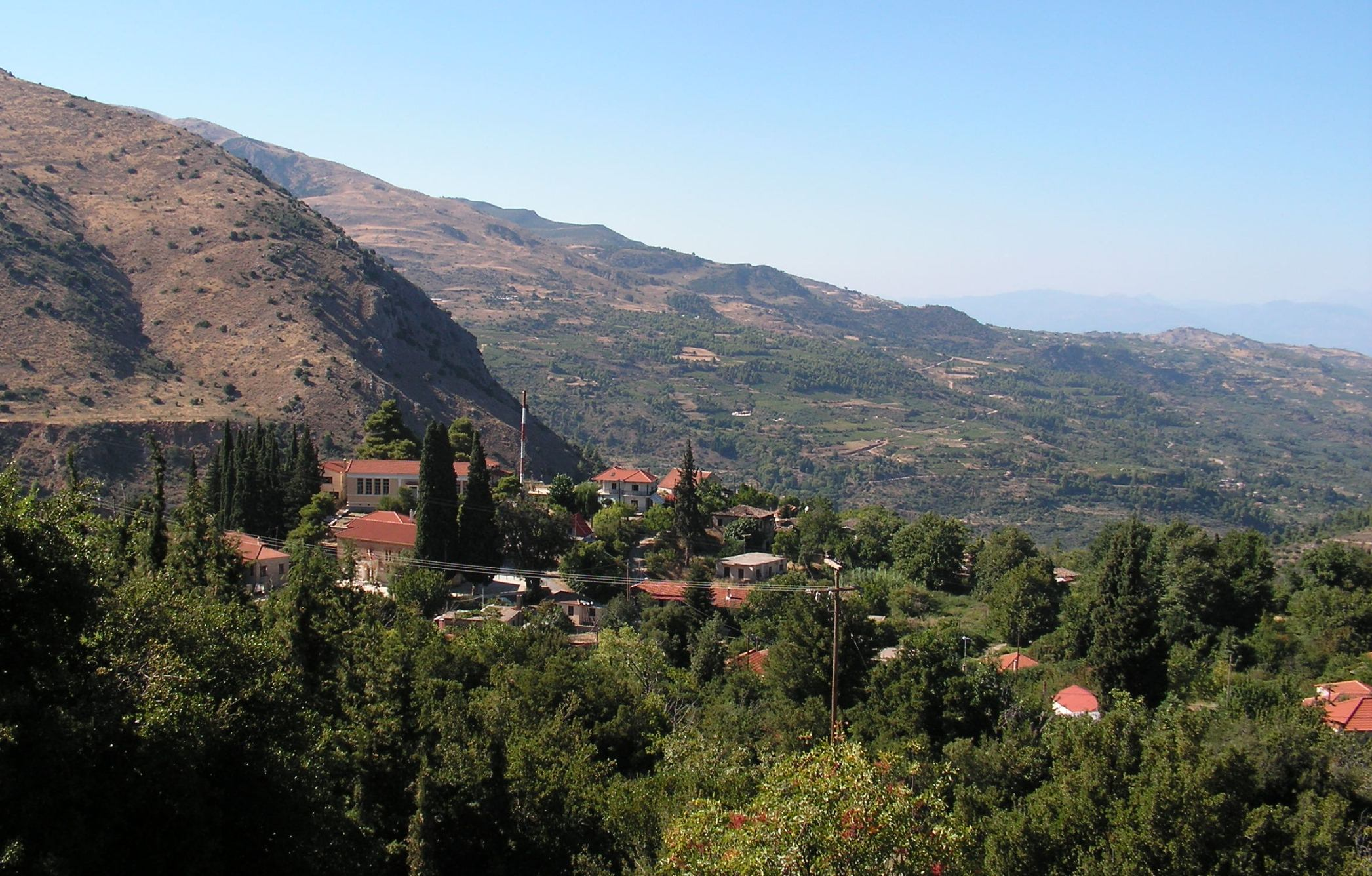

- Location within Greece
- Coordinates: 38°03′N 22°21′E
- Country: Greece
- Administrative region: Western Greece
- Regional unit: Achaea
- Municipality: Aigialeia
- Municipal unit: Aigeira

Population (2021)
  - Community: 57
- Time zone: UTC+2 (EET)
  - Summer (DST): UTC+3 (EEST)

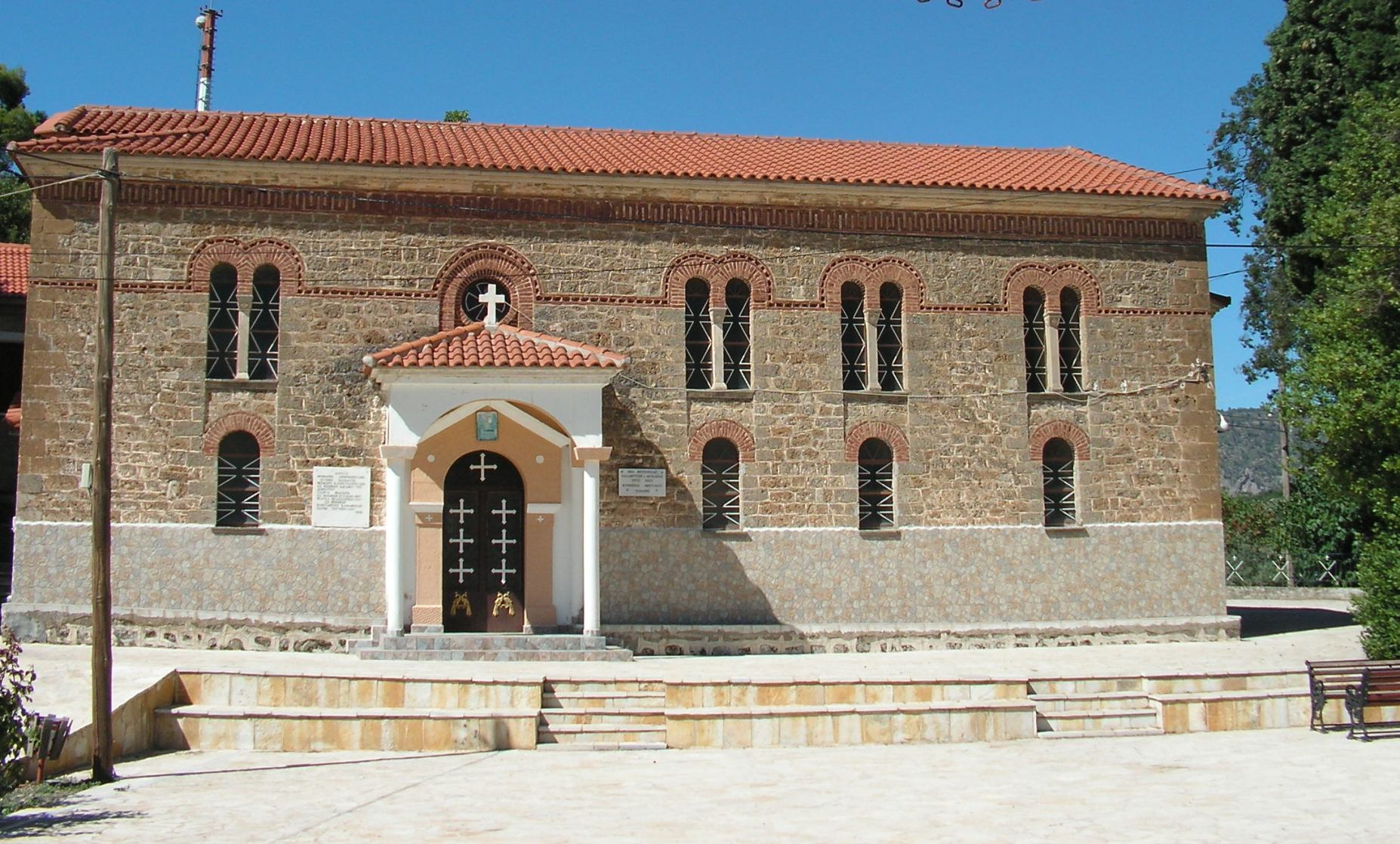
Dormition of the Theotokos church in Seliana

Seliana (Greek: Σελιάνα) also known as Phelloe (Greek: Φελλόη) is a village in the municipal unit of Aigeira, in the eastern part of Achaea, north Peloponnese, Greece. The village had a population of 57 in 2021. Aigeira is 10 km to the north, and Kalavryta is 21 km to the west. Seliana is connected by a 19 km road that leads to the town of Aegeira and the Greek National Road 8A, Athens - Corinth - Aigeira - Patras.

== Geography ==
The village is built at an altitude of ~750 m on the foothills of the fir forest of Sarantapikho and on the eastern slope of the valley of river Krios. The forest lies between the villages of Seliana, Perithori, Sarantapikho and Zarouchla and it is the largest forest of Achaea consisting mainly of black pine trees, firs and chestnuts. Seliana is surrounded by lush vegetation, old Platanus trees, walnuts, hazelnuts, plums, peaches, and many springs and you can hear the rushes of the running water all year round. The few inhabitants are mainly engaged in livestock farming and farming and in the cultivation of Apple, Plum and vegetables (mainly bean cultivation, which is the traditional food of Seliana).

== History ==
The village of Seliana coincides with ancient Phelloe a small town of ancient Greece described in Pausanias book "Description of Greece - Achaea". Excavations in the broader area of Seliana have been conducted by the Austrian Archaeological Institute at Athens, the Italian School of Archaeology at Athens, the University of Salerno and the Greek Ephorate of Prehistoric and Classical Antiquities. In the village there are few remnants of ancient Phelloe in different places but the most notable are those beside the old chapel of St. Basil where there is still an ongoing excavation (University of Salerno report identifies the observable wall beside the chapel as a construction of Hellenistic Period). In the report of the archaeologists we read "Prospection covered the ca. 30ha of the territory of modern Seliana as defined by the Evrostina mountains and to the west by the Krios valley. Oral and written testimonia concerning site location were verified on the ground. Despite poor visibility, exploration revealed occupation from the Late Bronze Age to late antiquity". Seliana was officially designated as an archaeological site by the Greek Ministry of Culture in 1996.

During the Greek War of Independence (1821-1830) in the broader area around Seliana two battles took place, one in the beginning of the revolution and one in the year 1827. Also four large caves which are located close to the village served as a shelter for women and children when the Turkish general Ibrahim Pasha of Egypt invaded north Peloponnese in 1827.

There is a strong relation between the village of Seliana and the village of Selianitika. According to historian A. Fotopoulos the inhabitants of Seliana descended from the mountains to the coastal region of "Kryovrysi" near Aigio (where the village of Selianitika lies today) during the Ottoman period. Initially the residents of Seliana were spending the winter in Selianitika and the summer in their village of Seliana but later they settled permanently. The residents of Seliana carried with them the parish of Saint Basil (the oldest of Seliana's churches) and today Saint Basil is the patron saint of the village of Selianitika. The first population census of Seliana after the liberation of Greece from the Ottomans is made by the French scientists of the Morea expedition in 1832, under the guidance of the naturalist and geographer Jean-Baptiste Bory de Saint-Vincent. The population of the village at that time was 414 inhabitants (84 families). In 1853, Seliana is mentioned as the capital of the municipality of Phelloe and had a population of 590 (the whole municipality had 2883 and it included 7 villages of the area). In the 1879 population census the village's population had increased to 671.

== Notes ==
- Γεώργιος Κανελλόπουλος, Ιστορία και Λαογραφία των χωριών και οικισμών της Ανατολικής Αιγιαλείας - Καλαβρύτων, Αθήνα 1981. (History and Folklore studies of the villages and settlements of Eastern Aigialeia and Kalavryta regions, Georgios Kanellopoulos, Athens, 1981, in Greek)
- Kolonas L., Museum of Aigio, Ταμείο Αρχαιολογικών Πόρων και Απαλλοτριώσεων, Athens 2004 ISBN 960-214-254-5 (in Greek)
- Αθ. Φωτόπουλος, Ιστορικά και Λαογραφικά της Ανατολικής Αιγιάλειας και Καλαβρύτων, Αθήνα 1982 (Historic And Demographics Of The Eastern Area of Aigialeia And Kalavryta, Ath. Fotopoulos, Athens 1982, in Greek)
- Christina A. Katsarou, Tracing the identity of an apsidal building in Ancient Phelloe, Interpreting the pottery record from geometric and archaic sanctuaries in the northwestern Peloponnese. proceedings of the International Online Symposium, November 5‒6, 2020: 978-3-7001-9197-1: Verlag der öaw
