= Myscellus =

Myscellus, or Myscelus (Ancient Greek: Μύσκελλος and Μύσκελος), son of Alemon, was a native of the Achaean polis Rhypes and the legendary founder of Crotona in 710 BC. According Ovid, the god Hercules appeared to Myscelus in a dream and commanded him to leave his native Achaea and seek out the "stone-filled waters of Aesar." Myscelus prepared to leave despite the laws that prohibited citizens from leaving their native land. When his plan was discovered by his fellow townspeople and he was brought to trial, he prayed to Hercules to come to his aid. The god responded by changing the color of the pebbles with which the townspeople had voted to convict Myscelus. He set sail and soon reached the river Aesar in southeastern Italy, where he discovered the raised burial mound of Croton. Myscelus founded a city which he named Croton in honor of Croton. Years earlier, this same Croton had welcomed Hercules as the hero was passing through the area. Upon leaving, Hercules thanked his host by promising that in two generations there would be a city in the spot where Croton lived. Myscelus thus fulfilled the earlier promise of Hercules.

Ovid's claim that he is reporting a well-established tradition appears to be borne out by the versions recorded by Strabo and Dionysius of Halicarnassus as well as other no longer extant sources. Nevertheless, these variants do provide details not in Ovid. Among these was the legend that Myscelus was assisted in founding a colony at Crotona by Archias, the future founder of the Greek colony at Syracuse on Sicily. The colony was led forth under the sanction of the Delphic oracle, and Myscelus, having previously been to survey the locality, was so much better pleased with the site of Sybaris that on his return he tried in vain to persuade the Delphic god to allow the colonists to select Sybaris as their place of settlement.
