= Frouros tis Anatolikis Aigialeias =

Frouros tis Anatolikis Aigialeias Φρουρός της Ανατολικής Αιγιαλείας
- Type: Weekly
- Format: N/A
- Owner: N/A
- Founded: 1996
- Headquarters: Aigeira and eastern Aigialeia, Greece

Frouros tis Anatolikis Aigialeias (Greek: Φρουρός της Ανατολικής Αιγιαλείας meaning the fortress of Eastern Aigialeia) was a newspaper that was founded in 1996 in Aigeira, Greece. It serves the entire eastern Aigialeia. Its editor-in-chief is Konstantinos Rozos. The newspaper features local news from eastern Aigialeia.

“Φρουρός της Ανατολικής Αιγιαλείας” in Greek meaning "guard", From November 2012 its only online version aigeira.com

== See also ==
- List of newspapers in Greece
