= Giannis Baltimas =

Greek footballer (born 1975)

Personal information
- Full name: Ioannis Baltimas
- Date of birth: 11 May 1972 (age 54)
- Place of birth: Neos Erineos, Aigialeia, Greece
- Height: 1.91 m (6 ft 3 in)
- Position: Goalkeeper

Senior career*
| Years | Team | Apps | (Gls) |
| 1996–2003 | Panachaiki | | |
| 2003–2004 | Doxa Drama | | |
| 2004–2005 | Paniliakos | | |
| 2005–2006 | Olympiacos Volos | | |
| 2006–2007 | Ilisiakos | | |
| 2007 | Fostiras | | |
| 2008 | Olympiakos Nicosia | | |
| 2008–2009 | Kallithea | | |
| 2009–2010 | Kalamata | | |
| 2010–2011 | Trikala | | |
| 2011–2012 | Odysseas Kordelio | | |
| 2012–2013 | Diagoras Vrachnaiika | | |
- * Club domestic league appearances and goals

Giannis Baltimas (Greek: Γιάννης Μπαλτιμάς; born 21 June 1975) is a retired Greek football goalkeeper.
