= Agela =

Group of young men in ancient Crete

An Agela (Ancient Greek: ἀγέλη) was an assembly or group of young men in ancient Crete, forming a significant part of their social and military life. These groups typically consisted of noble young men who lived together from the age of seventeen until their marriage. The agela system was an important aspect of Cretan society, focusing on physical training, military readiness, and fostering connections between the youth and the aristocracy.

== Structure ==
The agela was composed of the sons of the most prominent families in Cretan society. Young men remained at home with their families until the age of sixteen. After reaching this age, they were enrolled into an agela. Prior to this point, they were referred to as ἀπάγαλοι (apagali), meaning those who were not part of an agela. Once part of an agela, these young men were called ἀγέλαστοι (agelastoi).

The agela system was known for its aristocratic nature, granting great influence to particular families. These youth groups were typically supervised by an elder, known as the ἀγελάτης (agelates), who was often the father of one of the youths responsible for gathering the group. The agelates' primary role was to oversee the military training, gymnastic exercises, and general discipline of the youths, including accompanying them on hunts. The agelates were also authorized to punish any disobedience within the group. He was accountable, however, to the state, which supported the agela at the public expense.

== Marriage ==
All members were required to marry at the same time. Upon leaving the agela, the young men partook in the ἀνδρεῖα (andreia), which were the public meals for adult men.

== Legacy and Similar Systems ==
In later periods, the agela system was not universal across all of Crete and was preserved only in a few states, such as Lyctus.

In Sparta, a similar system existed where youths left their parents' homes at the age of seven and entered the βοῦαι (boeai).
