= Leuctrum (Achaea) =

Leuctrum or Leuktron (Ancient Greek: Λεῦκτρον), was a deme (dependent township) of Rhypes, a city in Achaea, mentioned by the ancient geographer Strabo. One suggested location for it is the fortified hill of Agios Konstantinos southwest of modern Leontio, Achaia.
