= Kamares, Achaea =

Kamares Καμάρες
- Community
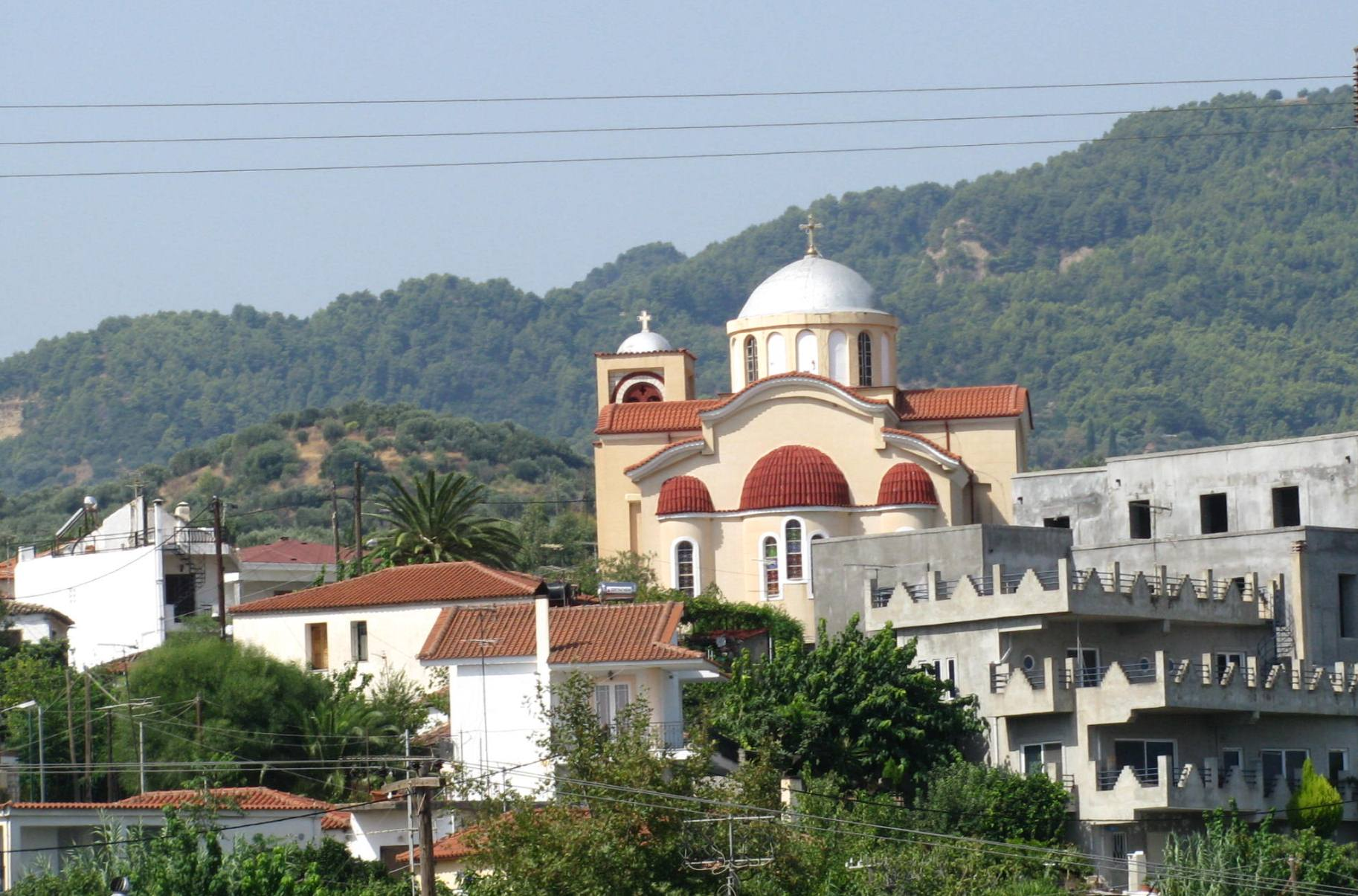

- Location within Greece
- Coordinates: 38°18′N 22°00′E
- Country: Greece
- Administrative region: West Greece
- Regional unit: Achaea
- Municipality: Aigialeia
- Municipal unit: Erineos

Population (2021)
  - Community: 1,301
- Time zone: UTC+2 (EET)
  - Summer (DST): UTC+3 (EEST)

Kamares (Greek: Καμάρες) is a village and a community in the east-northeastern part of Achaea, Greece. Kamares was an independent commune until 1994 when it became part of the municipality of Erineos. Erineos became part of the municipality Aigialeia in 2011. The community Kamares consists of the villages Kamares, Bouka and Pefka. Kamares is situated near the Gulf of Corinth, 9 km northwest of Aigio. The Greek National Road 8A (Patras - Corinth) and the railway from Patras to Corinth (not in operation anymore since OSE announced the suspension of all the rail service in the Peloponnese in January 2011) run through the village.

== Historical population ==
Year	Village population	Community population
1981	1,274	-
1991	1,309	-
2001	1,228	1,325
2011	1,218	1,323
2021	1,194	1,301
