= Erineus (Thessaly) =

Erineus (Ancient Greek: Ἐρινεός), also known as Erineum or Erineon (Ἐρινεόν) was a town of Phthiotis in ancient Thessaly, mentioned by Strabo and Stephanus of Byzantium.

Its site is unlocated.
