= Erineus (Achaea) =

Coordinates: 38°18′35″N 21°59′36″E

Erineus or Erineos (Ancient Greek: Ἐρινεός), also known as Erineum or Erineon (Ἐρινεόν) was a town of ancient Achaea, mentioned by Pausanias as the port of Rhypes. Thucydides writes that during Peloponnesian War, Erineus was used as the base of the Peloponnesian League's fleet that was to guarantee the transport of supplies to the army that was in Sicily. In the vicinity of Erineus a naval battle was fought against the Athenian fleet that was in Naupactos in 413 BCE. Pliny the Elder says it was one of the towns - along with Sicyon, Aigeira and Aegion - where the inhabitants of Helike and Boura took refuge when these were submerged as a consequence of the earthquake of 373 BCE.

Its site has been located near modern Lampiri (Λαμπίρι, Λαμπίριον).
