= Rhypes =

Polis (city-state) of ancient Achaea

Coordinates: 38°13′11″N 22°00′44″E

Rhypes (Ancient Greek: Ῥύπες), or Rhypae or Rhypai (Ῥύπαι) was a polis (city-state) of ancient Achaea, 30 stadia west of Aegium, and was one of the original twelve Achaean cities. It had ceased to be a member of the Achaean League in the time of Polybius, who mentions Leontium in its place. Rhypes, however, continued to exist down to the time of Augustus; but this emperor destroyed the city and transferred its inhabitants to Patrae, and its territory (Ῥυπίς, or ἡ Ῥυπική) was divided between Aegium and Pharae. Its ruins were seen by Pausanias, in the 2nd century, at a short distance from the main road from Aegium to Patrae. We learn from Strabo that this town was mentioned by Aeschylus as κεραυνίας Ῥύπας, or "Rhypes stricken by the thunderbolt." It was the birthplace of Myscellus, the founder of Croton.

In the territory of Rhypes there was a suburb called Leuctrum (Λεῦκτρον), and also a seaport named Erineum (Ἐρινεόν or Ἐρινεὸς λιμήν) which is mentioned by Thucydides, and which is described by Pausanias as 60 stadia from Aegium.

The site of Rhypes is located south of modern Koumari.

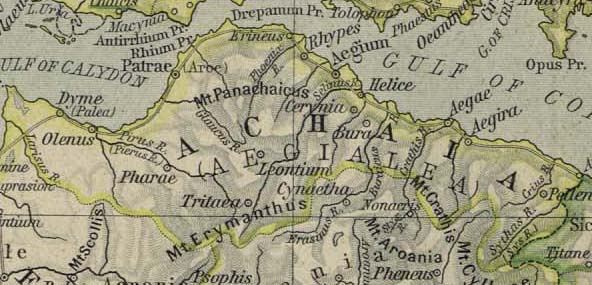
The ancient map of achaea with Rhypes on the map.

== See also ==
- List of ancient Greek cities
