= Rododafni =

Rododafni Ροδοδάφνη
- Community
- Location within Greece
- Coordinates: 38°16′N 22°03′E
- Country: Greece
- Administrative region: West Greece
- Regional unit: Achaea
- Municipality: Aigialeia
- Municipal unit: Sympoliteia

Population (2021)
  - Community: 2,776
- Time zone: UTC+2 (EET)
  - Summer (DST): UTC+3 (EEST)
- Postal code: 251 00
- Area code: 2691
- Vehicle registration: ΑΧ

Rododafni (Greek: Ροδοδάφνη, before 1928: Μουρλά - Mourla) is a town in northern Achaea, Greece. It is located on the Gulf of Corinth, 4 km northwest of Aigio and 28 km east of Patras. It was the seat of the municipality of Sympoliteia, which is a municipal unit of the municipality Aigialeia since 2011. The Greek National Road 8A (Athens - Corinth - Patras) and the railway Corinth - Patras pass through the town. Rododafni's beach and the area along the coast is called Akoli, while the settlement lying in between is called Avythos.

== Population ==
Year	Population
1981	1,822
1991	2,736
2001	2,514
2011	2,564
2021	2,776

== Sporting clubs ==
- Avythos 2017 - football (soccer)
- Con Dimitropoulos aqua / sailing club
- Madeleine Dimitropoulos - Australian State Swimmer for Victoria 2011
- Georgio Giannellis - Australia Driver Olympics 2012
- Mart Ottivano - Shotput 1998 World champion

== See also ==
- List of settlements in Achaea
