= Panachaiko =

Mountain range in northwest Peloponnese, Greece

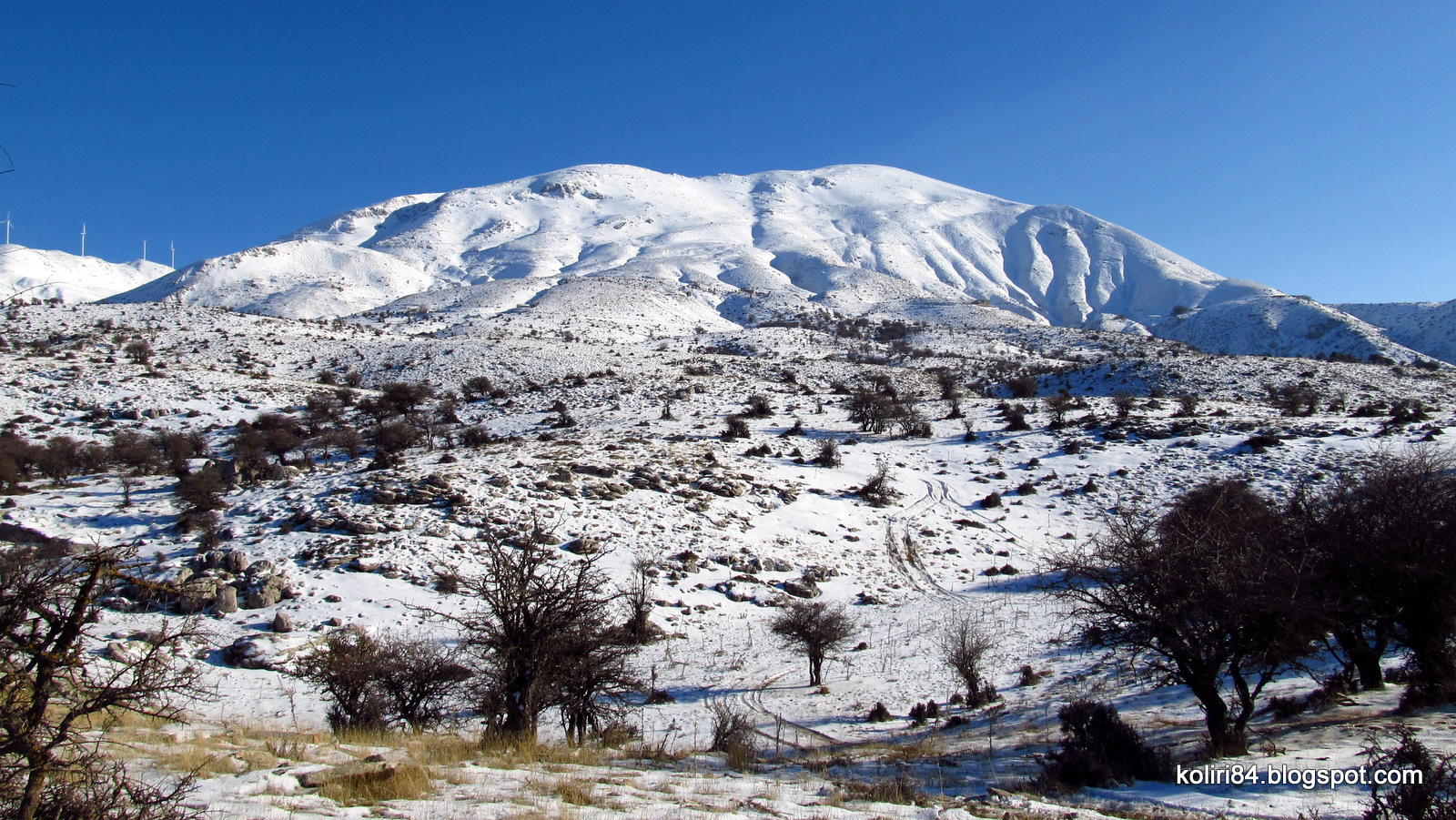
- View of the second highest peak, during winter

Highest point
- Peak: Palavou Pyrgos
- Elevation: 1,926 m (6,319 ft)
- Prominence: 1,094 m (3,589 ft)
- Listing: Ribu
- Coordinates: 38°12′9″N 21°52′8″E

Dimensions
- Length: 20 km (12 mi)

Geography
- Location within Greece
- Country: Greece
- Regional unit: Achaea

The Panachaiko (Greek: Παναχαϊκό, "Panachaean"), also known as Vodias (Βοδιάς) mainly at the Middle Ages, is a mountain range in Achaea, Peloponnese, Greece. It spans about 20 km in length from north to south, and 15–20 km from east to west. It is the northernmost mountain range in the Peloponnese. The highest point, named Pyrgos Palavou (Πύργος Παλαβού), is 1,926 metres (6,319 ft).

The mountain is home to two shelters, Greece's largest wind farm with 40 generators, which opened in 2006, and two communications stations. Snow is common in areas over 1,000 m in the winter. Paragliding is common in areas under 1,100 m. Due to overgrazing, frequent forest fires, and the appropriation of land for housing, the mountain's ecology and soil have suffered greatly, to the extent that much of the soil is now barren or can only support herbaceous vegetation. The range is sparsely forested, mainly on its western and southern slopes, while the most fertile areas lie on the eastern and western slopes.

== Gallery ==
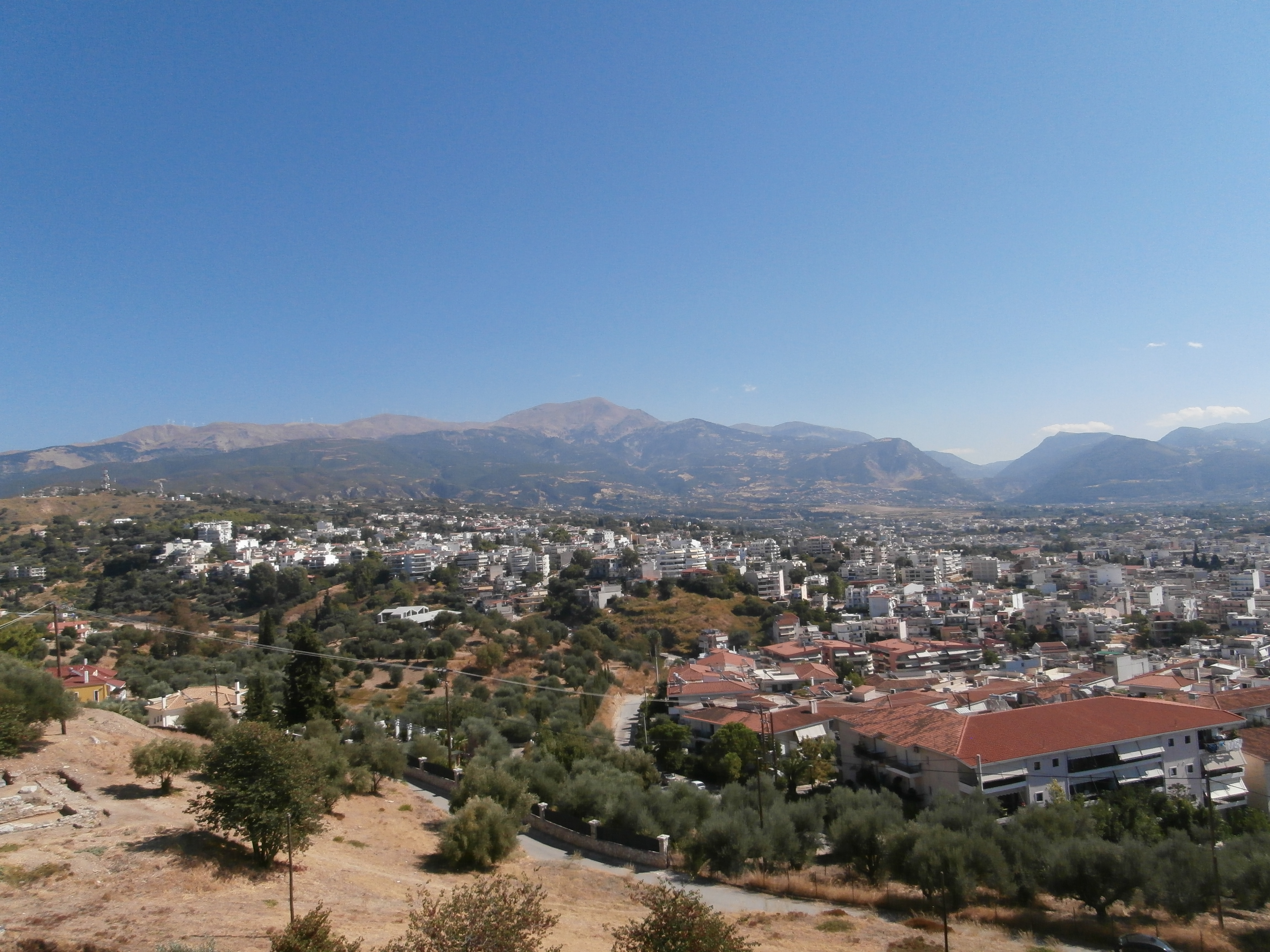
Panachaiko from the castle of Patras

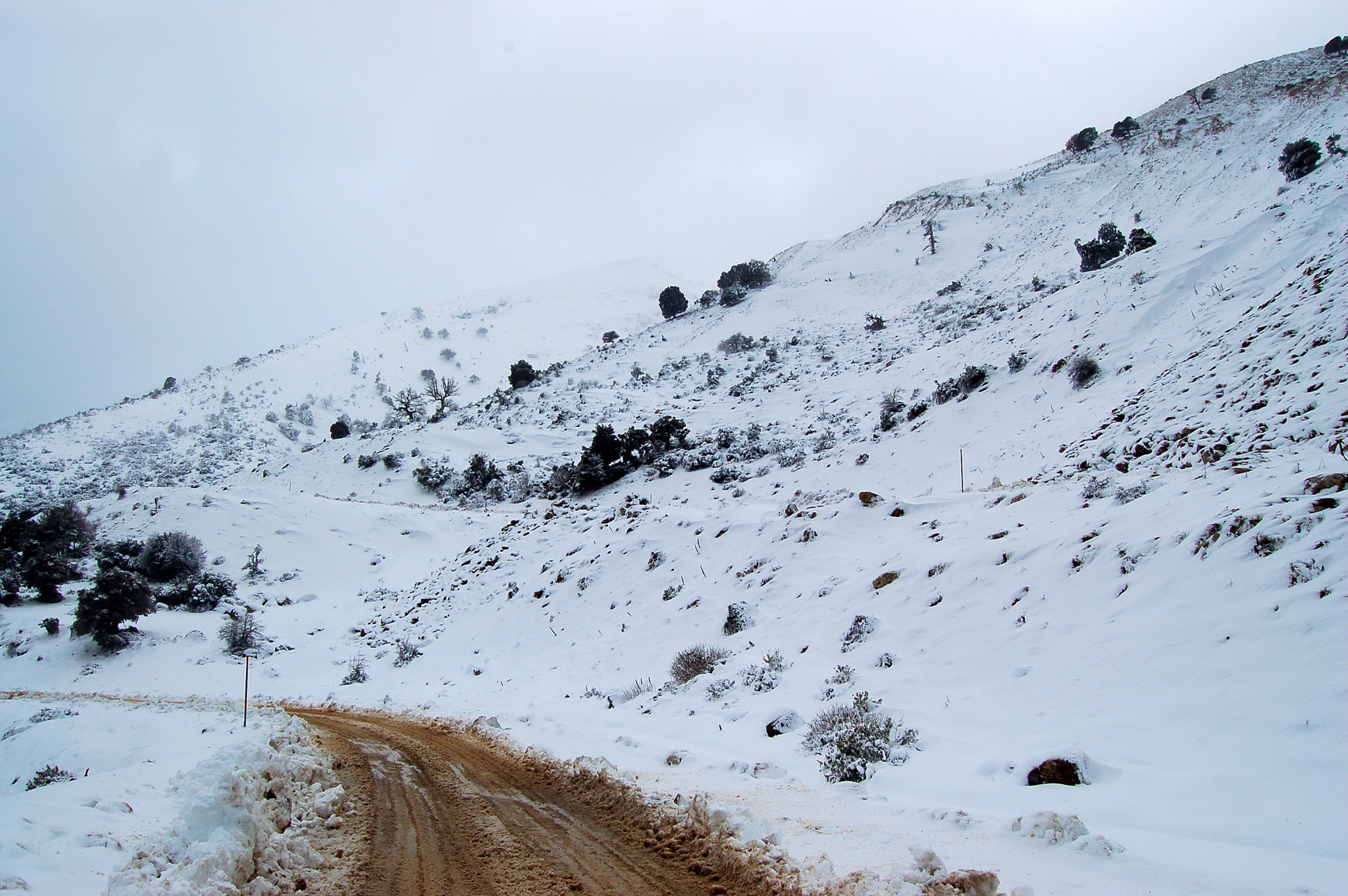
During the winter

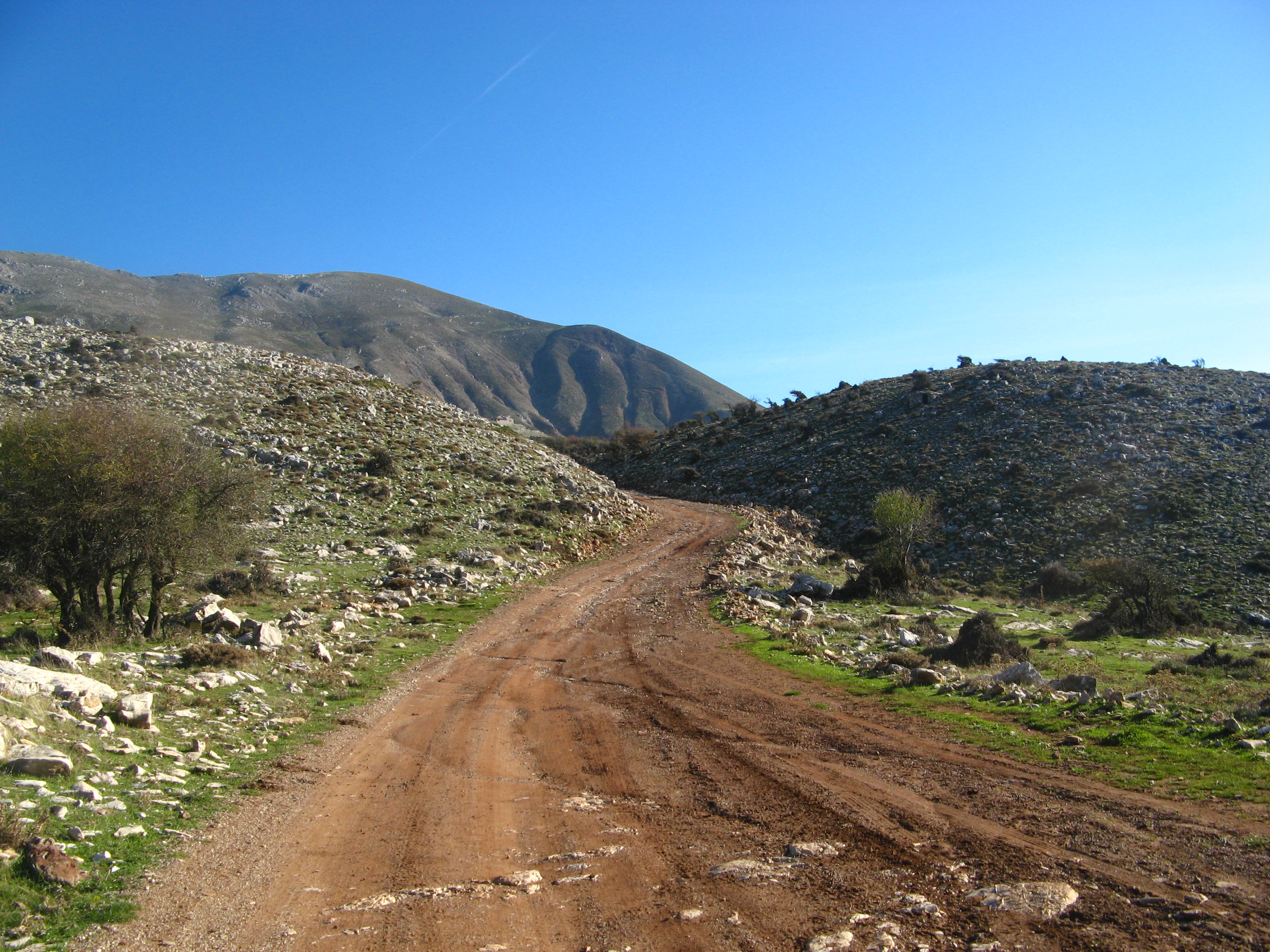
Mountain trail

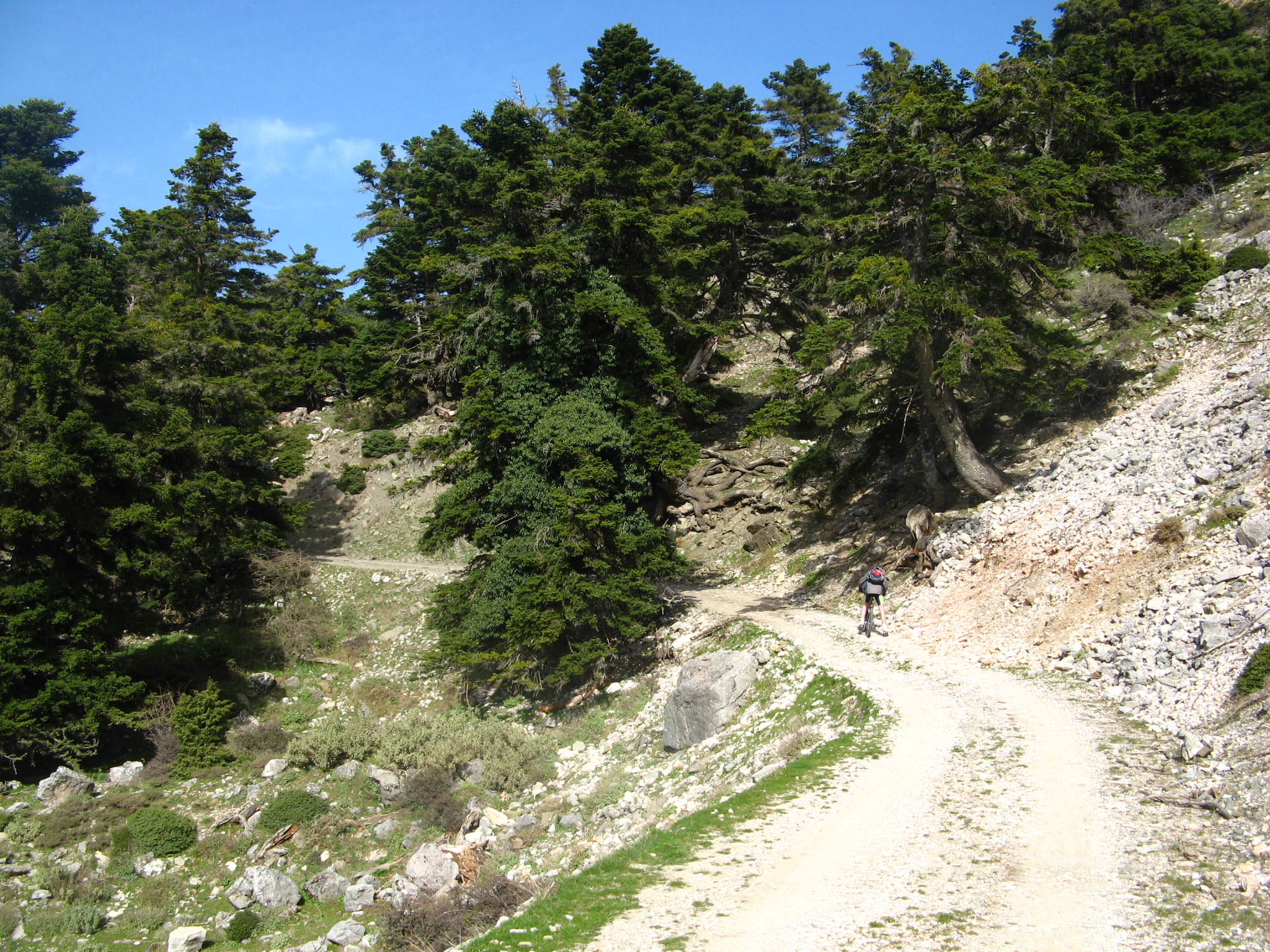
Ascending path

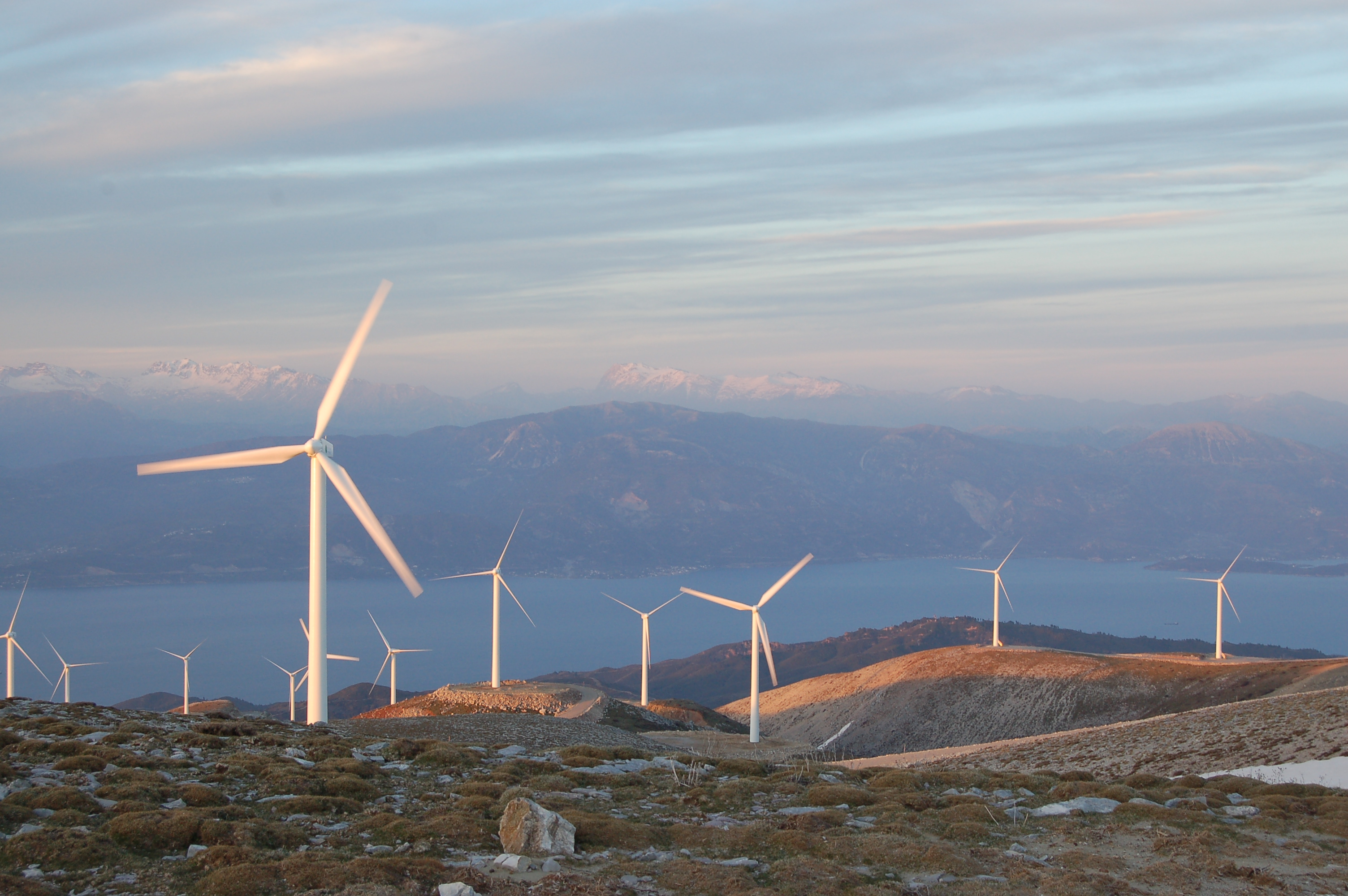
Wind farm

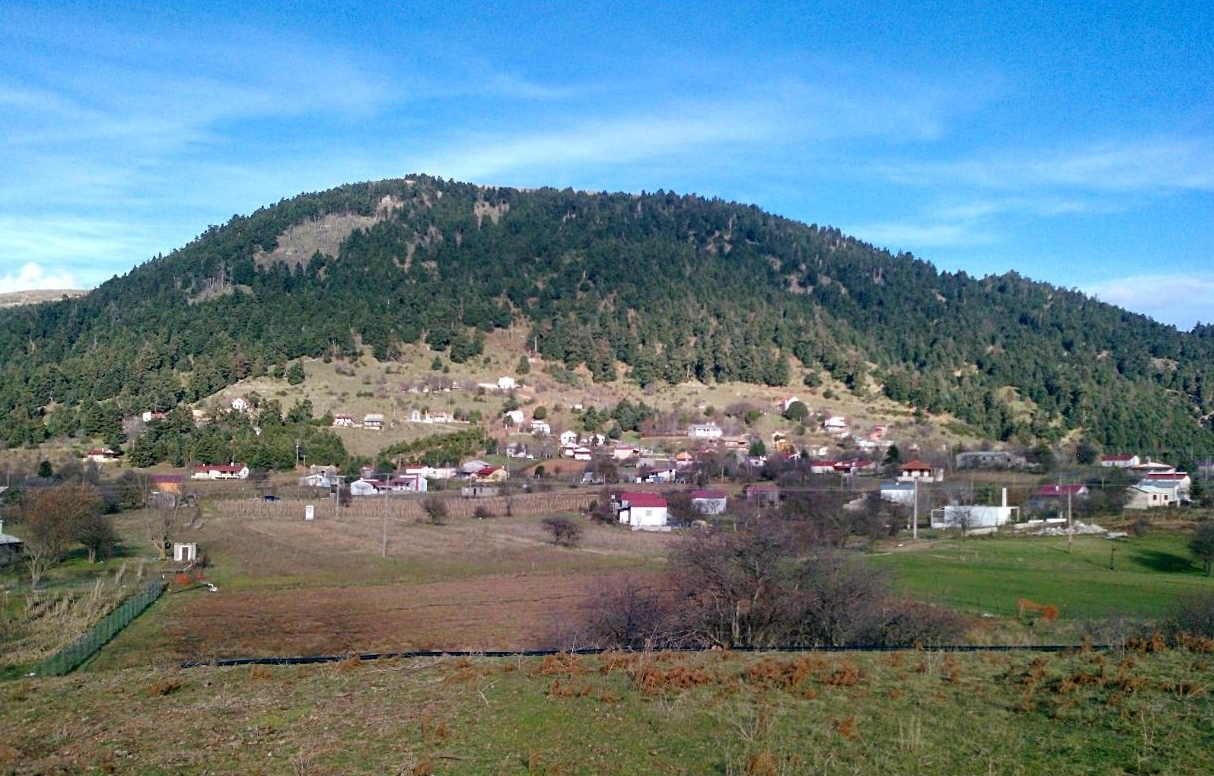
Rakita plateau

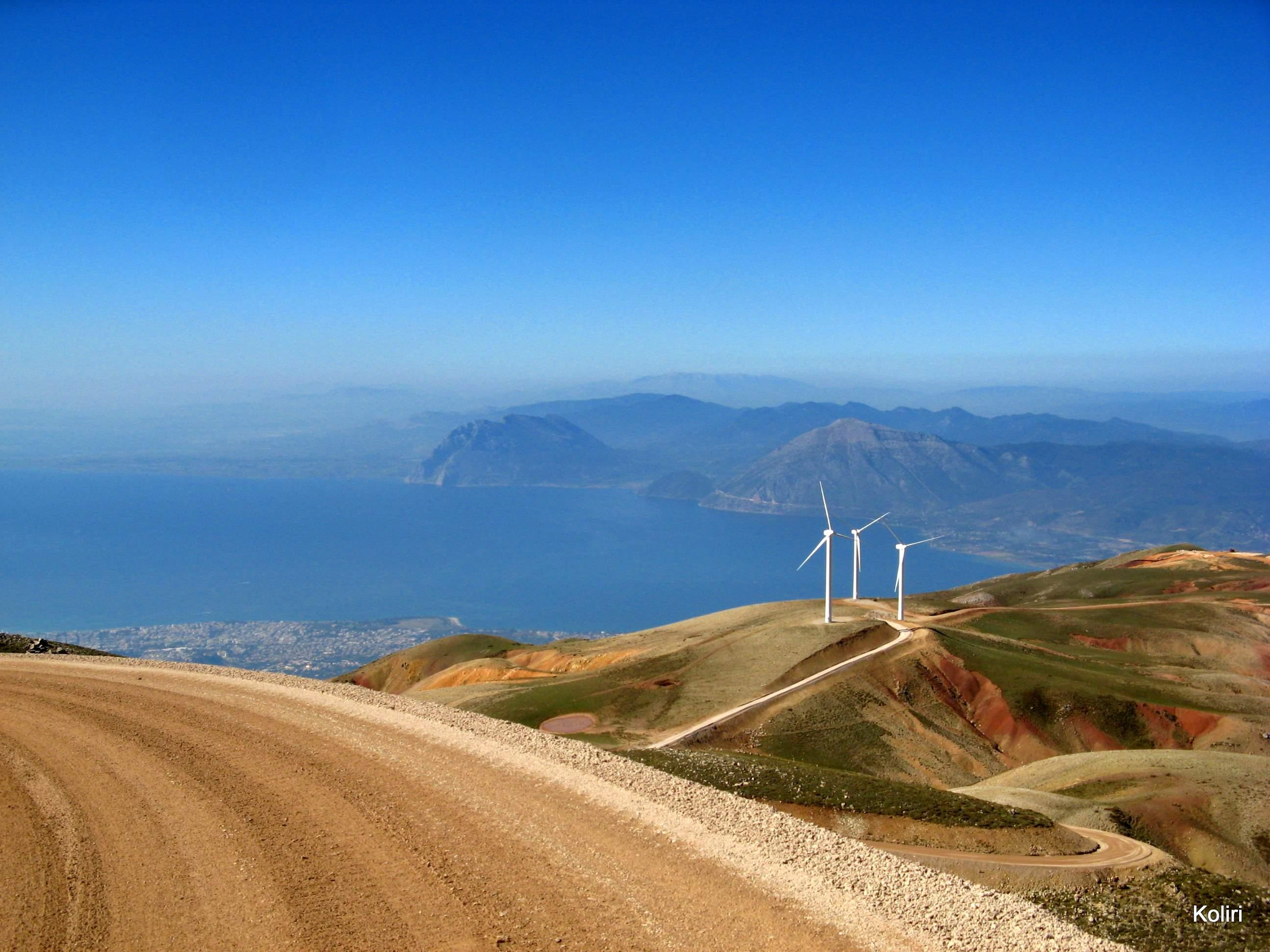
Road to wind farm

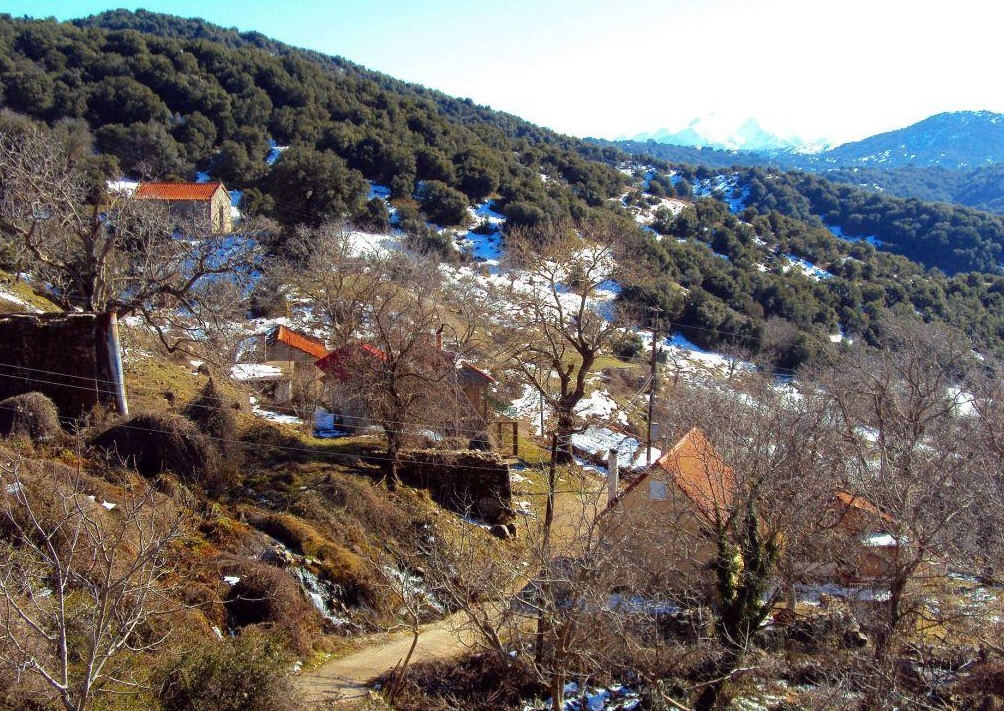
Pigi (Zoumpata) village

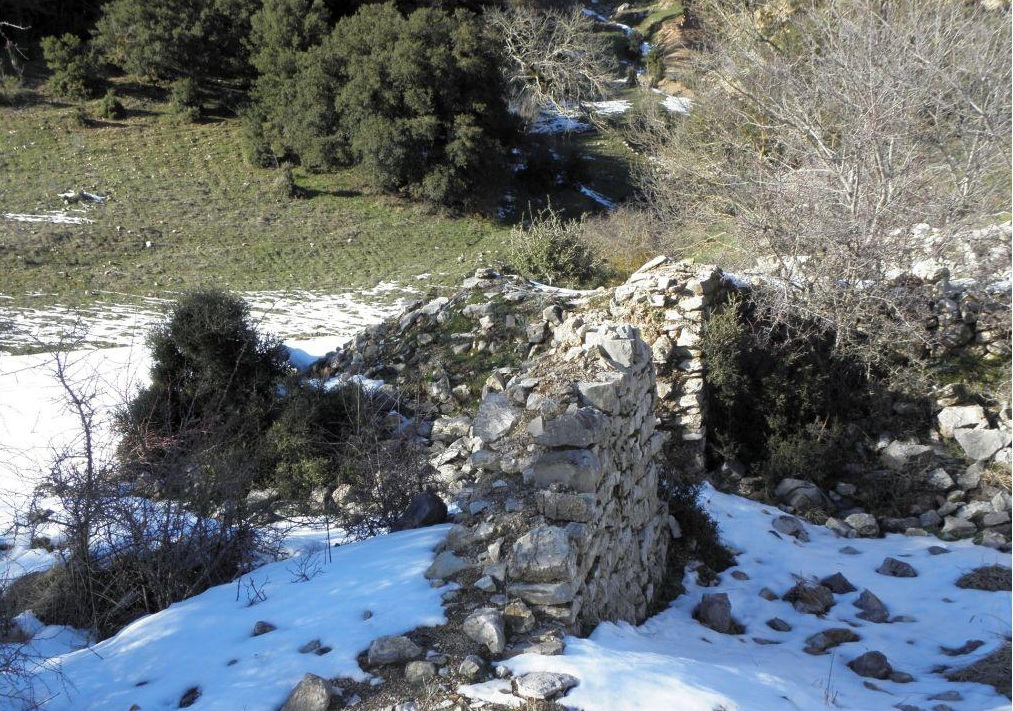
Sapia Vrysi ruins

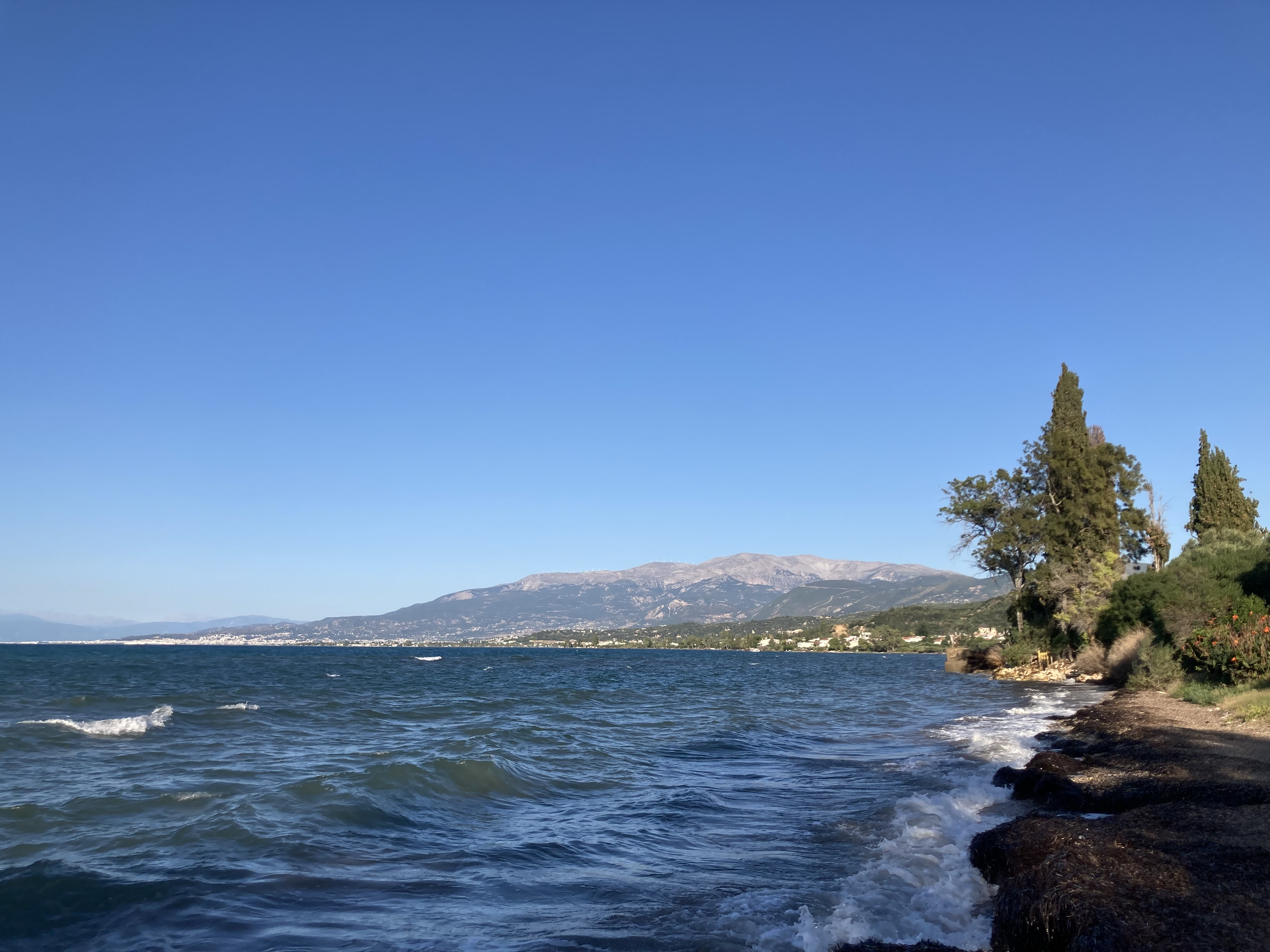
Mount Panachaiko viewed from the suburb of Tsoukaleika

Mount Panachaiko viewed from the area of Anthoupoli
