= Sympoliteia (municipality) =

Sympoliteia Συμπολιτεία
- Municipal unit
- Location within the regional unit

- Location within Greece
- Coordinates: 38°16′N 22°03′E
- Country: Greece
- Administrative region: West Greece
- Regional unit: Achaea
- Municipality: Aigialeia

Area
  - Municipal unit: 85.505 km^{2} (33.014 sq mi)
- Elevation: 174 m (571 ft)

Population (2021)
  - Municipal unit: 6,162
  - Municipal unit density: 72.07/km^{2} (186.6/sq mi)
- Time zone: UTC+2 (EET)
  - Summer (DST): UTC+3 (EEST)
- Postal code: 251 00
- Area code: 2691
- Vehicle registration: ΑΧ

Sympoliteia (Greek: Συμπολιτεία) is a former municipality in Achaea, West Greece, Greece. Since the 2011 local government reform it is part of the municipality Aigialeia, of which it is a municipal unit. The municipal unit has an area of 85.505 km^{2}. Population 6,162 (2021). The seat of the municipality was in Rododafni.
