= Aigialeia =

Municipality in the Peloponnese, Greece

Aigialeia Αιγιάλεια
- Municipality
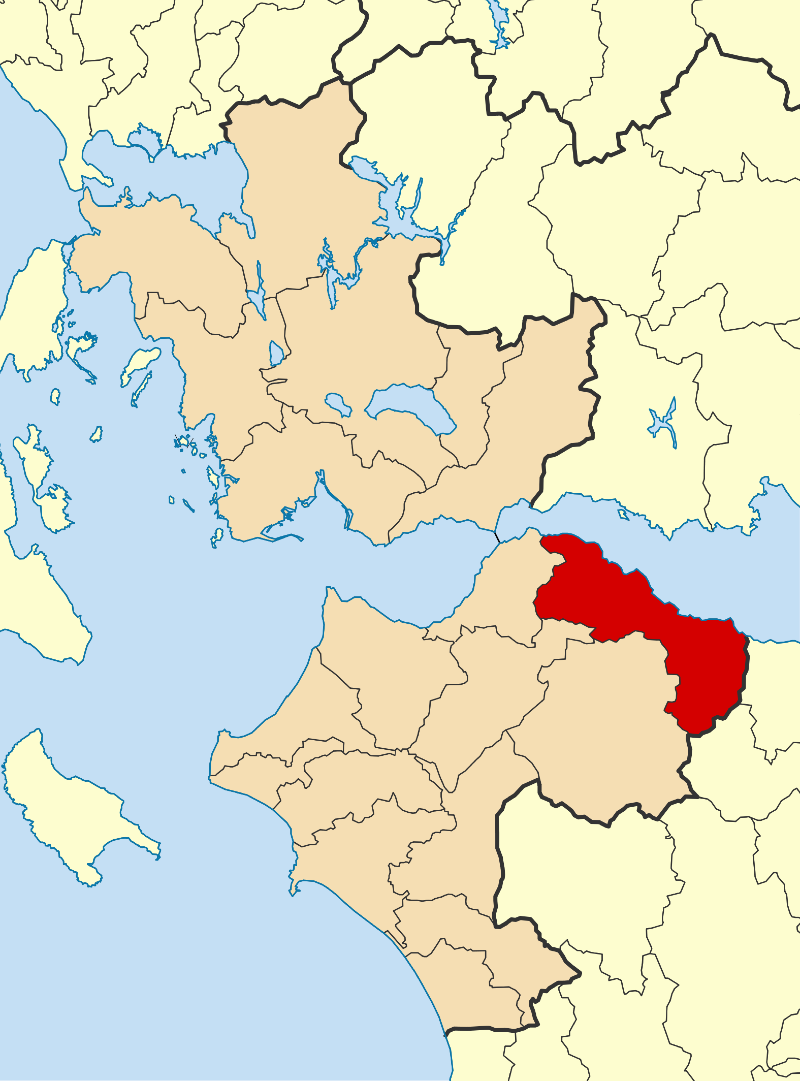

- Location within Greece
- Coordinates: 38°15′N 22°5′E
- Country: Greece
- Geographic region: Peloponnese
- Administrative region: West Greece
- Regional unit: Achaea
- Seat: Aigio

Government
  - Mayor: Panagiotis Andriopoulos

Area
  - Municipality: 723.1 km^{2} (279.2 sq mi)

Population (2021)
  - Municipality: 46,990
  - Density: 64.98/km^{2} (168.3/sq mi)
- Time zone: UTC+2 (EET)
  - Summer (DST): UTC+3 (EEST)
- Postal code: 25x xx
- Area code: 269xx
- Vehicle registration: ΑΧ
- Website: www.aigialeia.gov.gr

Aigialeia (Greek: Αιγιάλεια, pronounced [eˈʝalia]) is a municipality and a former province (επαρχία) in the eastern part of the Achaea regional unit, Greece. The seat of the municipality is the town Aigio. The municipality has an area of 723.063 km^{2}. The main towns are Aigio, Akrata and Diakopto. The municipality Aigialeia stretches from the south coast of the Gulf of Corinth to the mountainous interior of the Peloponnese peninsula. The main rivers of the municipality are the Selinountas and the Vouraikos.

== Municipality ==
The municipality Aigialeia was formed at the 2011 local government reform by the merger of the following 6 former municipalities, that became municipal units:

- Aigeira
- Aigio
- Akrata
- Diakopto
- Erineos
- Sympoliteia

== Province ==
The province of Aigialeia (Greek: Επαρχία Αιγιαλείας) was one of the three provinces of Achaea. Its territory corresponded with that of the current municipality, except the municipal unit Erineos. It was abolished in 2006.

== History ==
Present Aigialeia was the territory of the ancient Achaeans. Several towns of the Achaean League were located here: Rhypes, Aegium, Ceryneia, Boura, Helice, Aegae and Aigeira. Helice was submerged as a result an earthquake, which also destroyed Boura. In Roman times, the most important towns were Aegium and Aigeira. In the Middle Ages, the area was ruled by the Byzantines, Slavs, Franks, Venetians, and from the 16th century the Ottoman Turks. Aigialeia was liberated in the first stage of the Greek War of Independence, in 1821. Aigio was struck by an earthquake in 1995, damaging several buildings. The 2007 Greek forest fires cause great damage in the mountains of Aigialeia.

== Transport ==
=== Roads ===
The main highways in Aigialeia are:

- Greek National Road 8, old road Athens – Corinth – Rio – Patras
- Greek National Road 8A (part of E55 and E65): Athens – Corinth – Rio – Patras
- Greek National Road 31: Aigio – Kalavryta

=== Railways ===
The Piraeus, Athens and Peloponnese Railways line Athens – Corinth – Aigio – Patras – Pyrgos – Kyparissia runs through Aigialeia. The Diakofto–Kalavryta Railway is a rack railway, offering passenger service as well.

== Media ==
=== Newspapers, fanzines and others ===
- Filodimos – Aigio
- Frouros tis Anatolikis Aigialeias
- Proti tis Aigaleias – Aigio and Aigaleia
- Styx – Akrata

=== Radio ===
- Radio Aigio – 99.2 FM

=== Television ===
- AXION – Aigio

== Sporting clubs ==
- Panegialios – Football League
- Anagennisi/Aias Sympoliteias – Rododafni
- Aris Valimitika
- Asteras Temenis
- Diakopto AC – Diakopto – fourth division
- Egieas Egion
- Olympiakos Aigio – Aigio, fourth division
- Thyella Aigio – Aigio
- A.O. Vouraikos Diakopto
- A.O. Ziria
- Aris Longou – Longos, Achaea
- A.O. Thyella Aigeiras – Aigeira (1980-2018)
- A.O. Akrata – Akrata (1970-2018)
- A.E. Aigeiras/Akratas – Aigeira (merger of the two local clubs since July 2018)
