= Larissa (Elis) =

Ancient city in Achaea, Greece

Larissa (Ancient Greek: Λάρισσα and Λάρισα) was a town in the borderlands of ancient Elis and ancient Achaea. According to a fragment of Theopompus, cited by Strabo, it was on the road between Elis and Dyme. It is related to the Larissos River, which served as the border between Elis and Achaea and next to which was found a temple of Athena Larisea. It is doubtful whether Xenophon wants to refer to the city or the river, by mentioning 'κατὰ Λάρισσαν' as the place where the Spartan king Agis II entered Elis from Achaea.

The exact location of the city is unknown, but it has been suggested that it could be identified with the Dymaean Wall whose remains are adjacent to the current locations of Kalogria and Araxus.

Map of ancient Achaea (with place names in Greek)
