= Greek National Road 64 =

Trunk road in Greece

National Road 64
- Εθνική Οδός 64
- Route of the EO64 road, in blue

Route information
- Length: 15.2 km (9.4 mi)
- Existed: 9 July 1963–present

Major junctions
- East end: Kato Achaia
- West end: Araxos

Location
- Country: Greece
- Regions: Western Greece
- Primary destinations: Kato Achaia; Araxos

Highway system
- Highways in Greece; Motorways; National roads
← EO63	→ EO65

Greek National Road 64 (Greek: Εθνική Οδός 64), abbreviated as the EO64, is a national road in the regional unit of Achaea, Greece. Created in 1963 from a former national airport road, the EO64 is a branch of the EO9 from Kato Achaia to Araxos, north of Patras Araxos Airport.

== Route ==
The EO64 is officially defined as a branch of the EO9, running between Kato Achaia to the east and Araxos to the west. It passes through the villages of Niforeika, Kalamaki and Lakkopetra. According to the map of the national and provincial road network by the General Secretariat of Infrastructure (of the Ministry of Infrastructure and Transport) in April 2026, the road between Araxos and Patras Araxos Airport is part of Achaea Provincial Road 39.

== History ==
Ministerial Decision G25871 of 9 July 1963 created the EO64 from the old EO91, which was a national airport road that existed by royal decree from 1955 to 1963. In 1995, the EO64 became part of the secondary national road network.
