= Kalogria =

Kalogria (Greek: Καλογριά) may refer to the following places:

- Kalogria, the Greek name for Kallurga, in Northern Cyprus
- in Greece:
  - Kalogria, Achaea
    - Kalogria beach, a beach in Achaea, northwest Peloponnese
  - Kalogria, Chalkidiki, a village in Chalkidiki
  - Kalogria beach, Messenia, a beach in the municipality West Mani, Messenia
  - Kalogria Bay, in the Gulf of Euboea

== See also ==
- Kalogriana, a village in Karditsa regional unit
- Kalogriani, a village in Trikala regional unit
