= Teichus =

Dymaean Wall
- Teichos Dymaion (Greek)
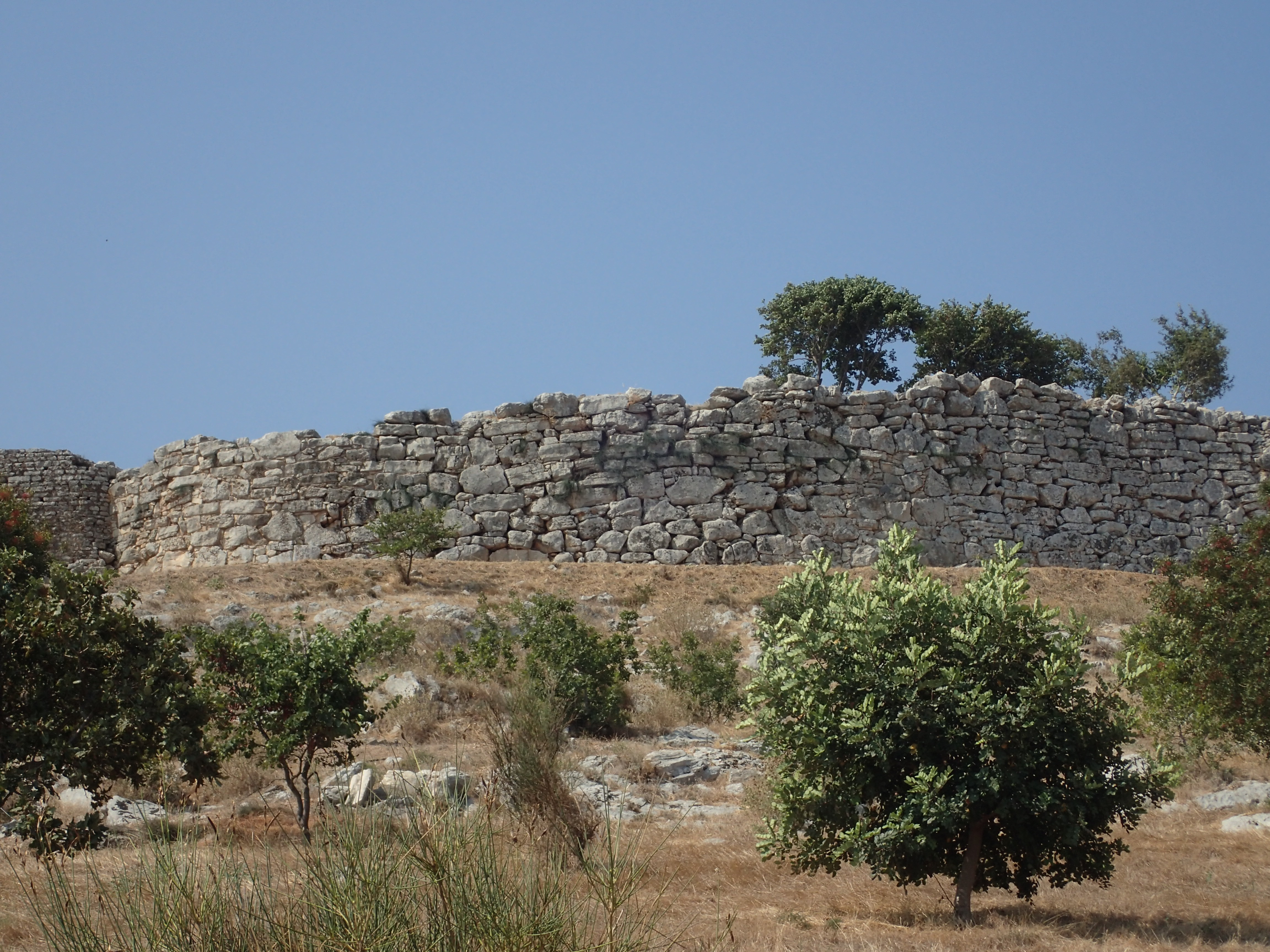
- Northern wall

- Location within Greece
- 38.1566°N 21.4032°E
- Region: Achaea

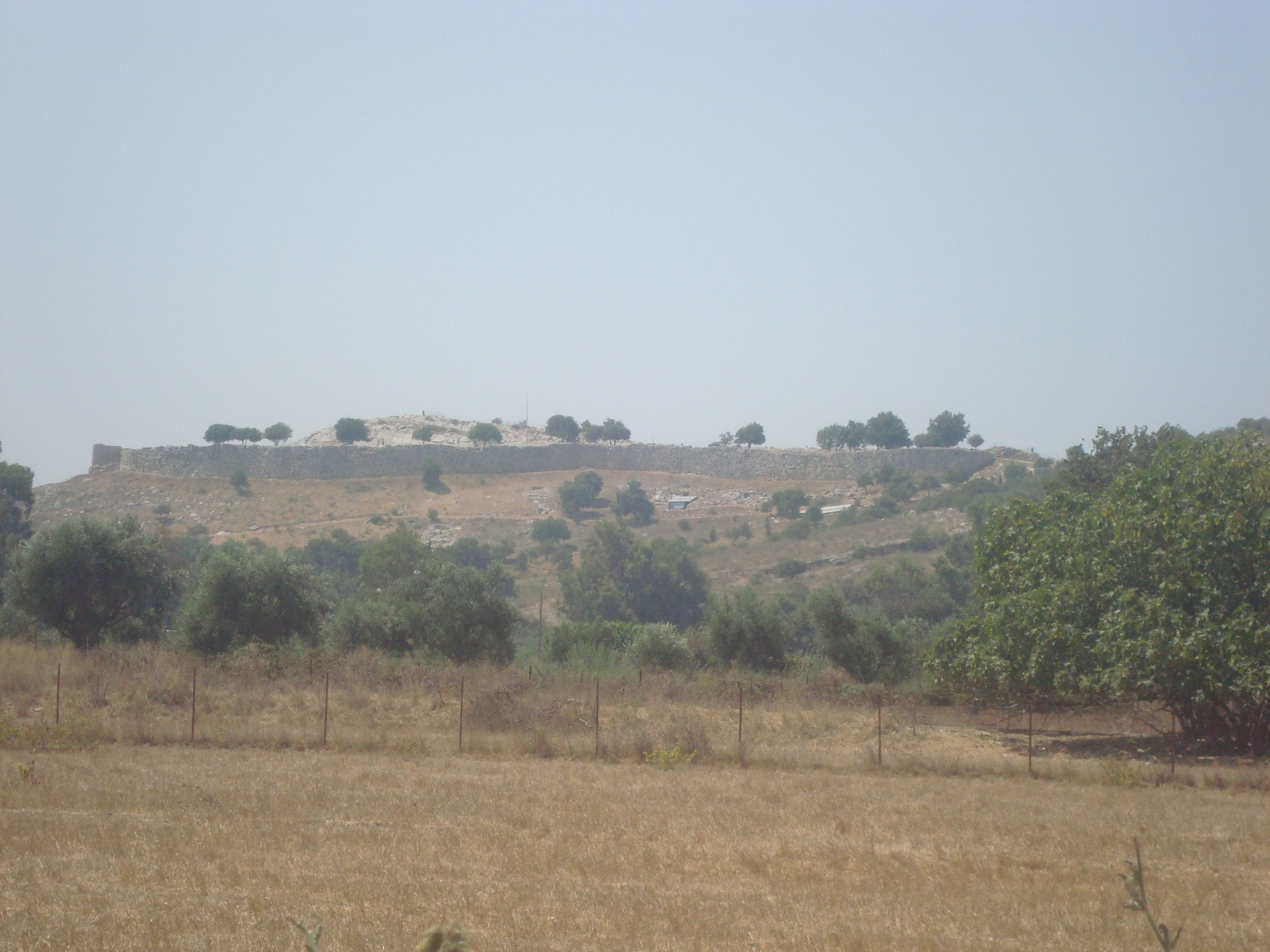
The acropolis of Teichus.

Teichus or Teichos (Ancient Greek: Τεῖχος), also known as Teichus/Teichos of the Dymaeans (Ancient Greek: Τεῖχος Δυμαίων, romanized: Teichos Dymaiōn) or Kalogria Castle, was a prehistoric acropolis (fortified settlement) in the territory of Dyme, in ancient Achaea, Greece, near the promontory Araxus, which was said to have been built by Heracles, when he made war upon the Eleans. It was only a stadium and a half in circumference, but its walls were 30 cubits high. It was taken by the Eleans under Euripides in the Social War in 220 BCE, but it was recovered by Philip V of Macedon and restored to the Dymaeans in the following year. It was also named the Dymaean Wall after the nearby ancient city of Dyme.

Its site is located near the modern Araxos. The fortress stands in a strategic position on a rocky hilltop, north of the Prokopos lagoon, near the village of Araxos. It was built in the Mycenaean period, probably around 1300 BC, but human occupation of the site started already around 3500 BC.

During the war between the Achaean and the Aetolian Leagues (220–217 BC) it was seized by king Philip V of Macedon.

It was deserted in the 18th century AD. During World War II it was used by occupying Italian forces, who built a number of military installations on the site and damaged the prehistoric fortifications.
