= Gianiskari beach =

Beach in Peloponnese, Greece

Coordinates: 38°10′33.8″N 21°21′58.3″E

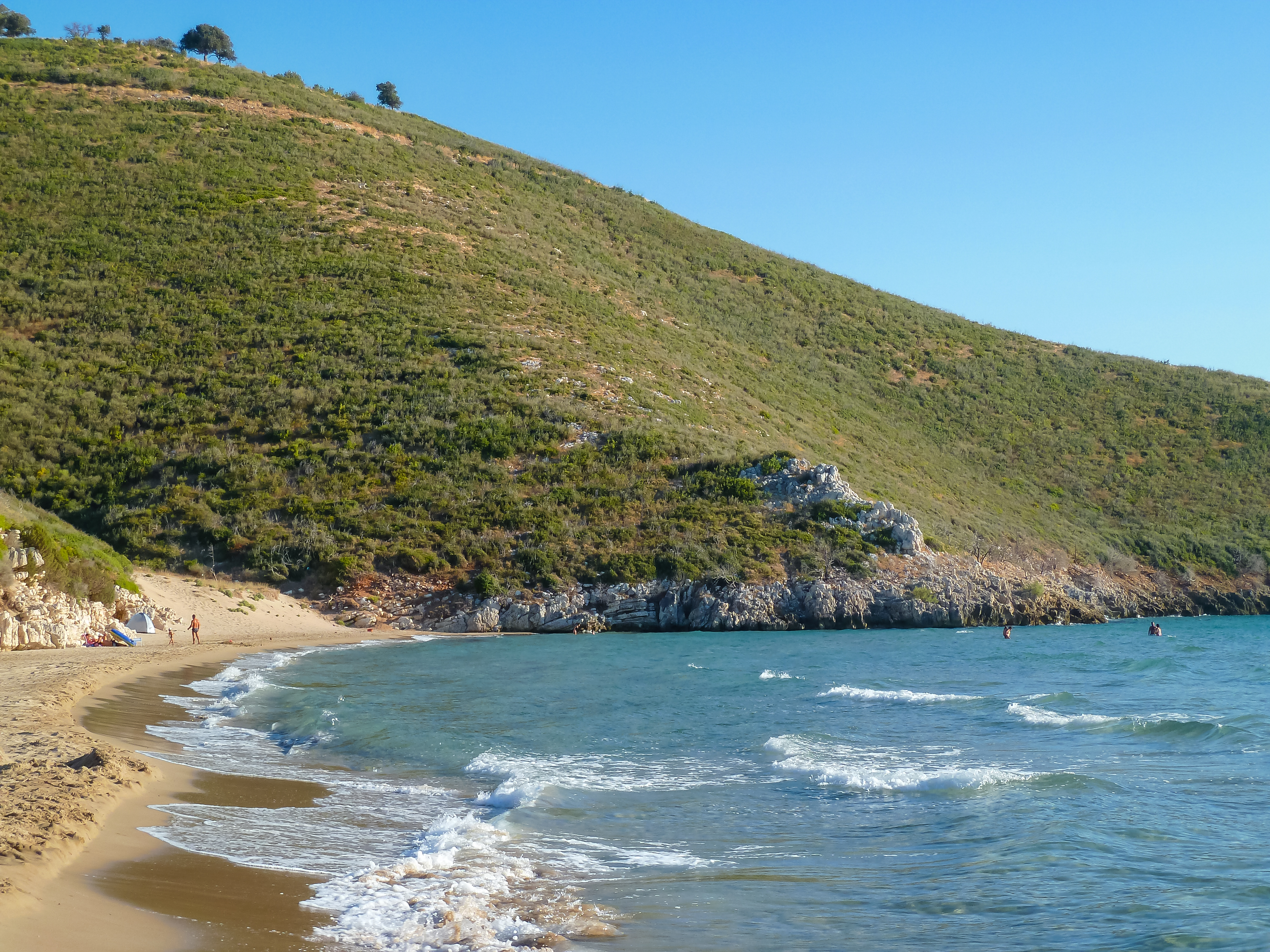
View of Gianiskari Beach, Western Achaia, Greece.

Gianiskari beach (Greek: Παραλία Γιανισκάρι), is the name of a sandy beach that is located in the vicinity of the village Akrotirio Araxou, in the northwestern Peloponnese, Greece. The word "Gianiskari" is a paraphrase of the word "Gialiskari" (Γιαλισκάρι) from medieval Greek word "Αιγιαλισκάριον", which is a diminutive form of the word "Aigialos" (Aἰγιαλός) meaning seashore.

It is situated on the Ionian Sea coast and it is the northwesternmost publicly accessible beach of the Peloponnese (north of the beach there is a restricted area belonging to the Araxos Naval Fort). The beach lies between two hills. The hills and the surrounding area of the beach were covered with kermes oaks and other trees and bushes native to the Mediterranean region, but multiple forest fires (in 2011, 2012, 2014 and 2017) destroyed completely all of the plantation. The beach is accessed through a partly dirt unpaved road that is starting from the village of Akrotirio Araxou. During the summer months it is a popular destination for locals. The only facilities during the summer period is a small canteen/beach bar.

In May 2018 the beach was covered by large amounts of sea grass of the kind Posidonia oceanica (which is endemic to the Mediterranean Sea) and for a width of 5-6 meters.

== See also ==
- Kalogria beach
