= Lakkopetra =

Lakkopetra Λακκόπετρα
- Community
- Location within Greece
- Coordinates: 38°10′N 21°27′E
- Country: Greece
- Administrative region: West Greece
- Regional unit: Achaea
- Municipality: West Achaea
- Municipal unit: Larissos
- Elevation: 5 m (16 ft)

Population (2021)
  - Community: 760
- Time zone: UTC+2 (EET)
  - Summer (DST): UTC+3 (EEST)
- Postal code: 252 00
- Area code: 26930

Lakkopetra (Greek: Λακκόπετρα) is a village and a community in the northeastern part of the municipal unit of Larissos, northwestern Achaea, Greece. The community consists of the villages Lakkopetra, Ioniki Akti, Karnari and Limanaki. It is located on the Gulf of Patras, 4 km east of Araxos, 4 km northwest of Limnochori, 9 km west of Kato Achaia and 26 km southwest of Patras. It is 3 km northeast of the Araxos Airport. Ioniki Akti is a known beach resort.

== Historical population ==
Year	Village population	Community population
1981	901	-
1991	758	-
2001	760	1,060
2011	645	782
2021	659	760

== See also ==
- List of settlements in Achaea
