= Akrotirio Araxou =

Village in Achaea, Greece

Coordinates: 38.186°N 21.387°E

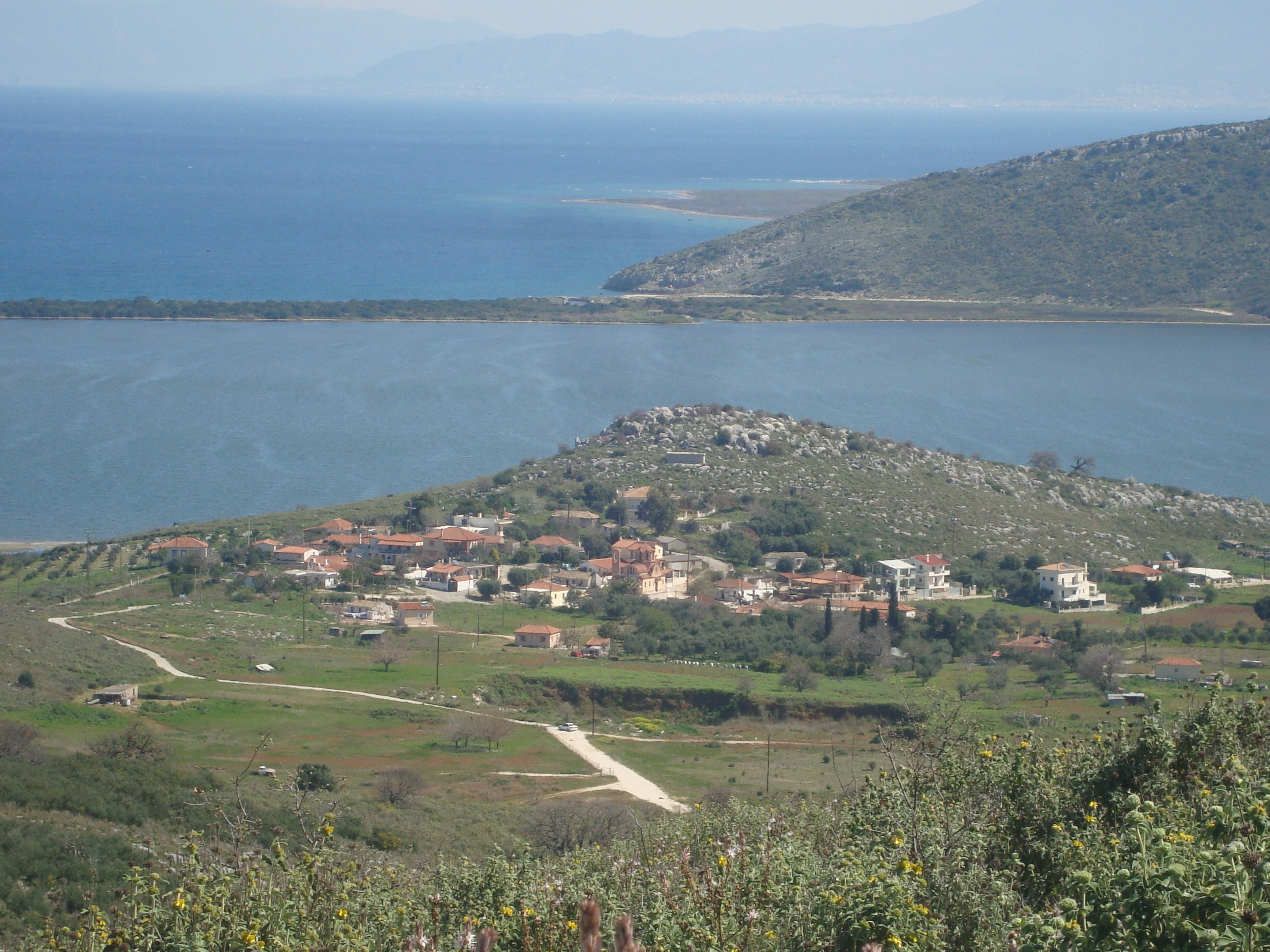
Akrotirio Araxou and the lagoon

Akrotirio Araxou (Greek: Ακρωτήριο Αράξου) is a small coastal village of Achaea, Greece. The village lies at the northwestern part of Peloponnese near Cape Araxos. The village of Araxos and the namesake military airport are few kilometers away.

Since 2011, Akrotirio Araxou is part of the municipal unit of Larissos, of the municipality West Achaea. The village is beside a lagoon known as Pappas, Kalogria, or Araxos. The lagoon covers an area of 450 hectares and has a maximum depth of 3,4 m. In the 2011 population census it had a population of 35.

Near the village is the Araxos Naval Fort (Ναυτικό Οχυρό Αράξου), a small military base of the Hellenic Navy. The base hosts the Naval Radio Transmitter Facility of Araxos (Κέντρο Εκπομπής Αράξου). A few kilometers away of the village is the sandy beach of Gianiskari. There is an unpaved dirt road that goes to the beach (partly paved, only for the first 2–3 km).
