= Kalogria beach =

Beach in northwest Peloponnese, Greece

Kalogria beach (Greek: Παραλία Καλόγριας) is the name of a sandy Blue Flag beach that is located in the vicinity of the village Araxos, in Northwestern Peloponnese, Greece. The beach is beside the Kotychi and Strofylia National Park, it has a length of ~9 Km and width 80m and is one of the longest sandy beaches of Greece. The beach is a popular destination for many tourists and Greeks.

== Sand dunes ==
The area close to the beach has many sand dunes that are formed by sea sand that moves with the aid of the westerly winds and the Ionian Sea waves. The dunes occupy an area of 200 hectares and can reach heights of up to 10 metres and widths from 20 – 500 metres. At the north edge of the beach there is the largest sand dune in Peloponnese and one of the largest in Greece.

== Infrastructure ==
At a close distance to the beach there are a couple of hotels and restaurants. Patras Araxos Airport is in a distance of 7 km.

== Forest fires ==
There have been many attempts from arsonists to burn the Strofylia forest beside the beach of Kalogria. On 13 August 2015 a fire burned 160 acres of forest. On 17 October 2017 there has been another major incident of forest fire in the protected area and beside Kalogria beach. The results of the wild fires are not easily observable when someone visits the beach from the north (except an area beside the large dune).

== See also ==
- Gianiskari beach

== Gallery ==
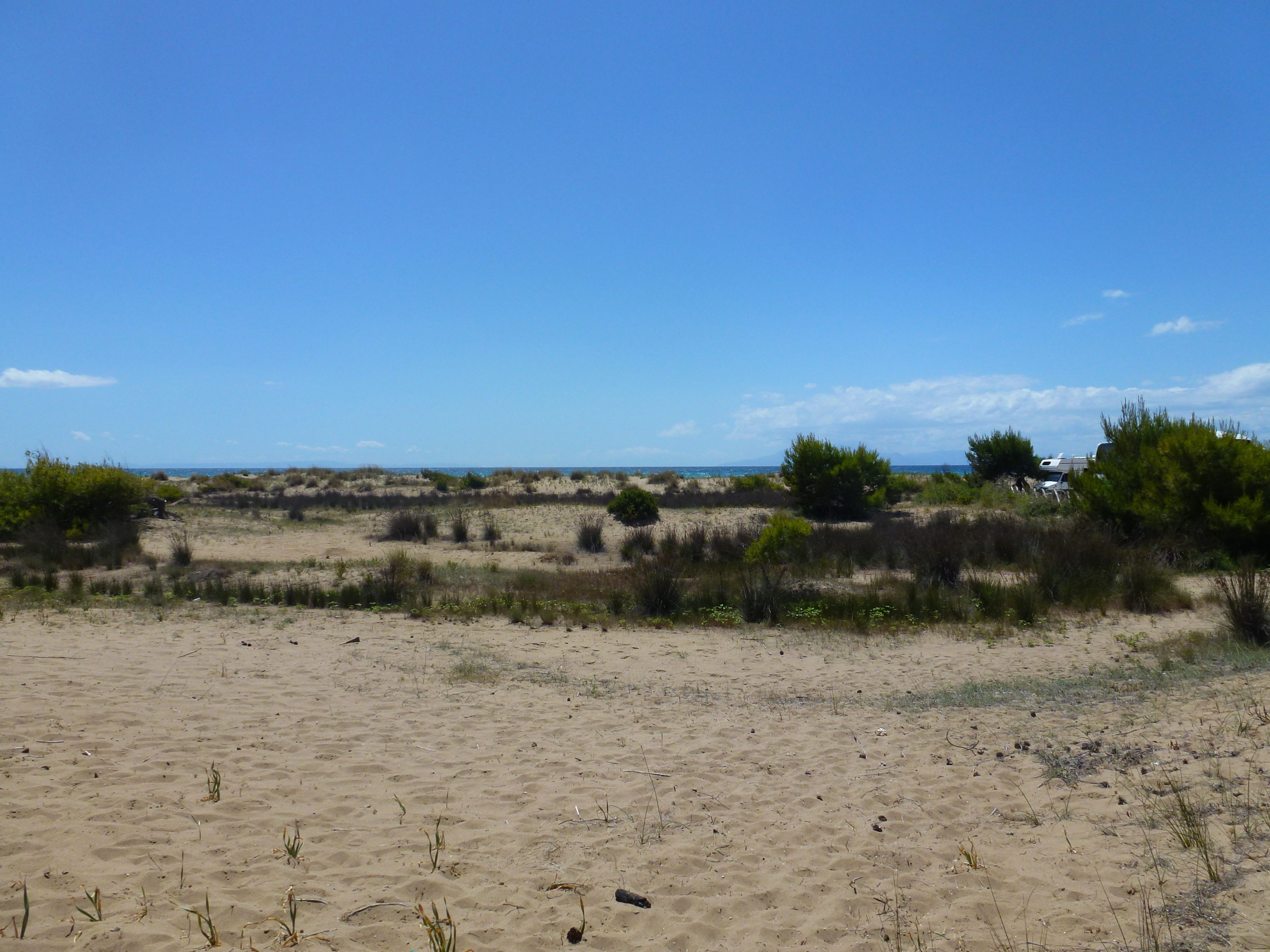
Sand dunes at Kalogria Beach

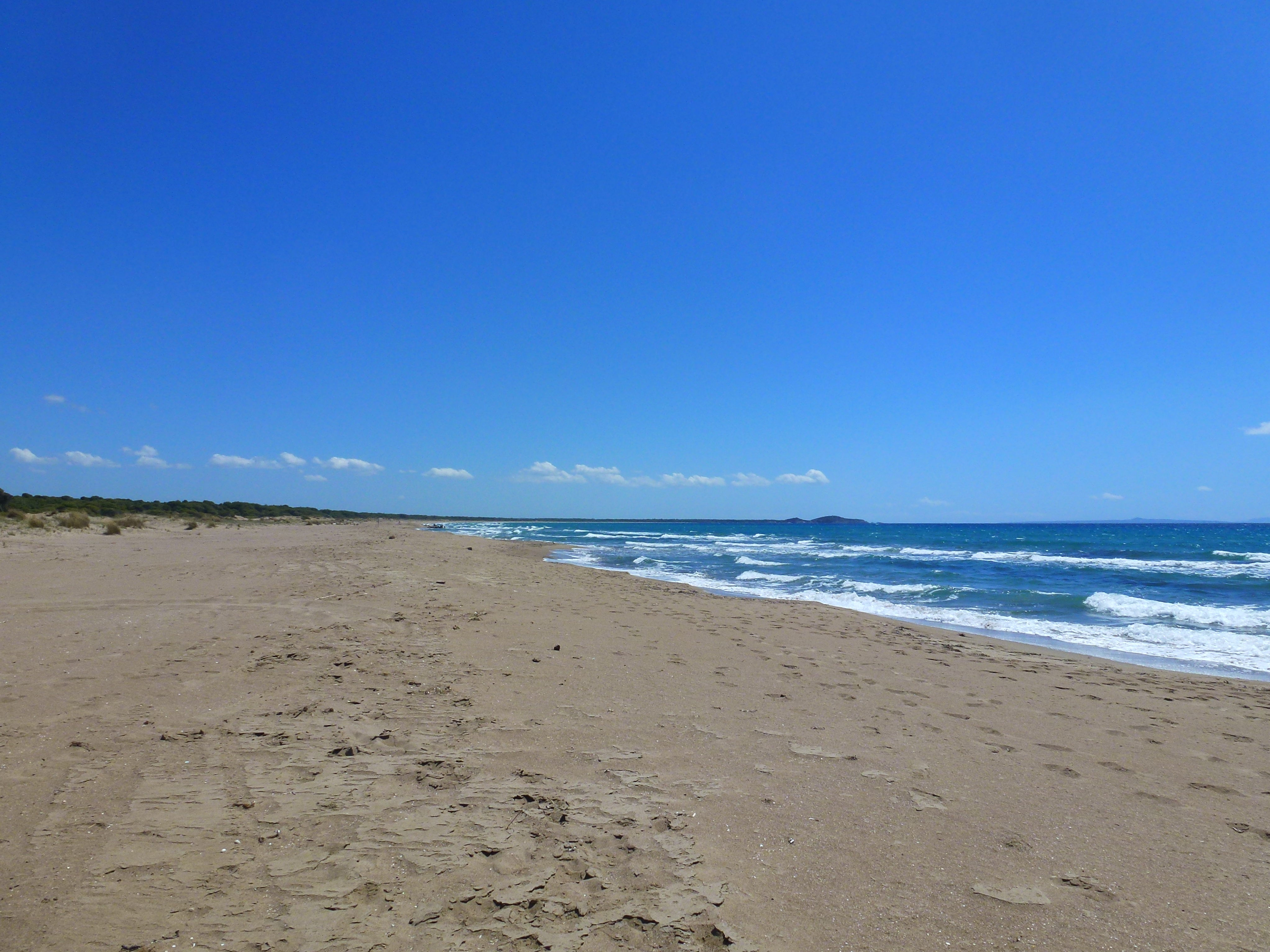
Kalogria Beach

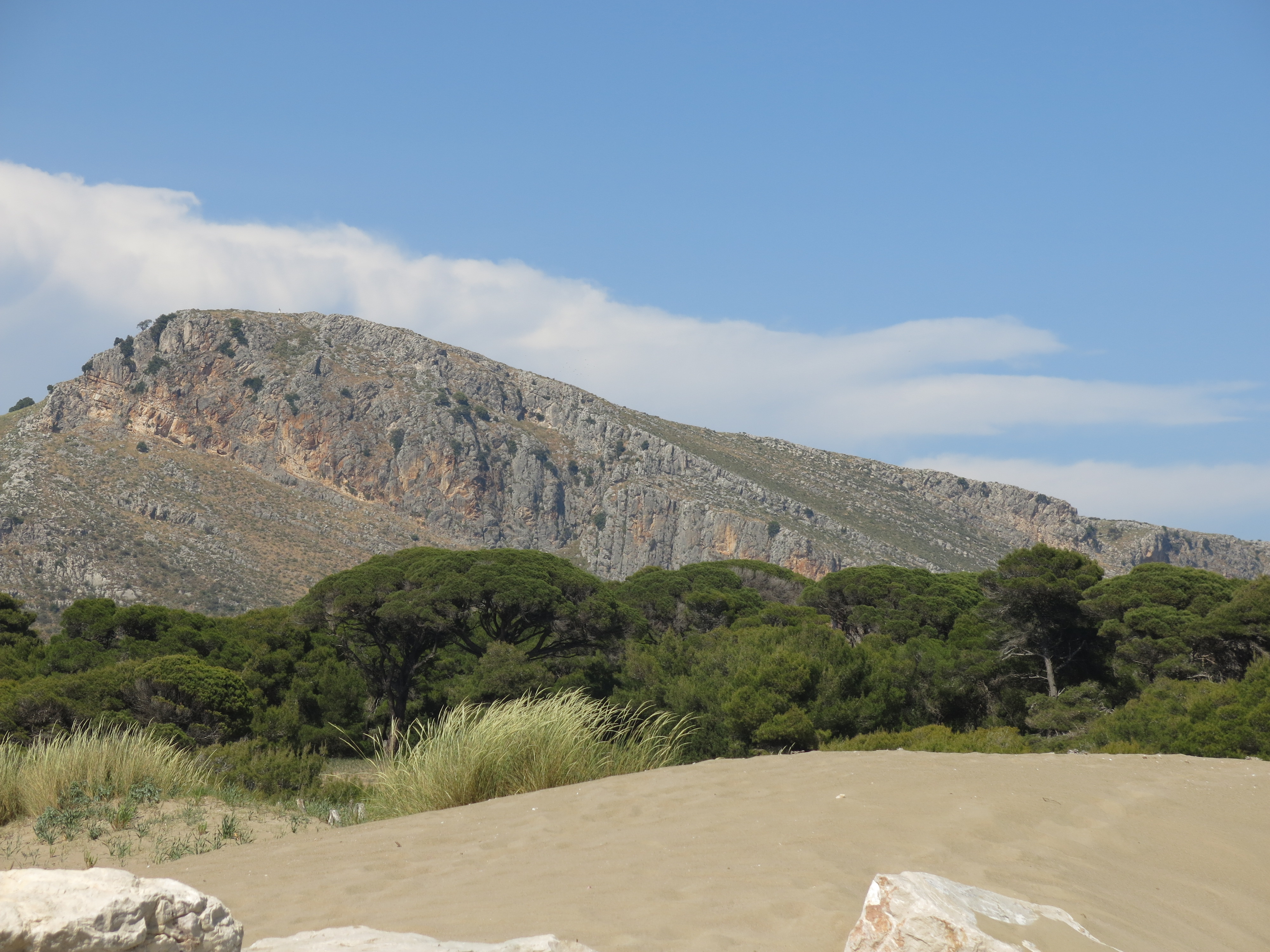
Kalogria beach, with the forest of Strofylia and Mavra Vouna hills in the background
