= Patras Araxos Airport =

Araxos Airport Κρατικός Αερολιμένας Αράξου
- IATA: GPA; ICAO: LGRX

Summary
- Airport type: Public / military
- Owner: Greek Armed Forces
- Operator: Hellenic Air Force and HCAA
- Serves: Patras and Pyrgos, Greece
- Location: Araxos
- Elevation AMSL: 46 ft (14 m)
- Coordinates: 38°09′04″N 021°25′32″E
- Website: www.hcaa.gr

Map
- Location within Greece

Runways
Direction	Length		Surface
Direction	m	ft	Surface
18R/36L	3,352	10,997	Concrete

Statistics (2018)
- Passengers: 182,129
- Passenger traffic change: ▲20.8%
- Aircraft movements: 1,365
- Aircraft movements change: ▲8.5%
- Sources:HCAA, DAFIF

Araxos Airport (Greek: Αεροδρόμιο Αράξου) (IATA: GPA, ICAO: LGRX) is the airport of Patras, the third-largest city in Greece. It serves as a combined civilian and military airport and is located near its namesake, the village of Araxos, Achaea. It is also known as Agamemnon Airport and primarily is used as an active air base for the Hellenic Air Force, with some civilian services to European destinations during the summer months. The airport facilities were very limited until 2007, when the construction of a new 1,477 m^{2} arrivals building was completed. Today the airport terminal covers a total area of 2,300 m^{2}.

== 116th Combat Wing ==
Araxos was established as a military airport in 1936, but construction of the runway was not completed until 1941, when it also became the site of the first radar installation in Greece.

The airport has served as the home base of the Hellenic Air Force's 116th Combat Wing (116 Πτέρυγα Μάχης) since May 1969, and of its precursor the 116th Combat Group (116 Σμηναρχία Μάχης) since April 1962. It currently comprises the 336th Bomber Squadron and 335th Squadron. The main aircraft used by both squadrons is F-16 Block 52+ Advanced.

== Airlines and destinations ==
The following airlines operate regular scheduled and charter flights at Patras Araxos Airport:

Airlines	Destinations
airBaltic	Seasonal charter: Riga
Austrian Airlines	Seasonal: Vienna
Chair Airlines	Seasonal: Zürich (begins 26 June 2026)
Enter Air	Seasonal charter: Warsaw–Chopin
GetJet Airlines	Seasonal charter: Vilnius
Luxair	Seasonal: Luxembourg
Neos	Seasonal: Milan–Malpensa
Sky Express	Seasonal charter: Timișoara
Smartwings	Seasonal charter: Bratislava, Katowice Prague, Warsaw–Chopin
Transavia	Seasonal: Paris–Orly
TUI fly Belgium	Seasonal: Brussels
TUI fly Deutschland	Seasonal: Düsseldorf, Frankfurt, Hanover, Munich, Stuttgart
Volotea	Seasonal: Lille, Nantes

== Ground transport ==
Araxos airport is located 45 km west of the city of Patras and 65 km north of Pyrgos. There are bus services from Patras to Araxos. There is no train connection.

== See also ==
- Transport in Greece
- Kalogria beach
