= Cape Araxos =

Cape in the Peloponnese, Greece

Coordinates: 38°12′58″N 21°22′37″E

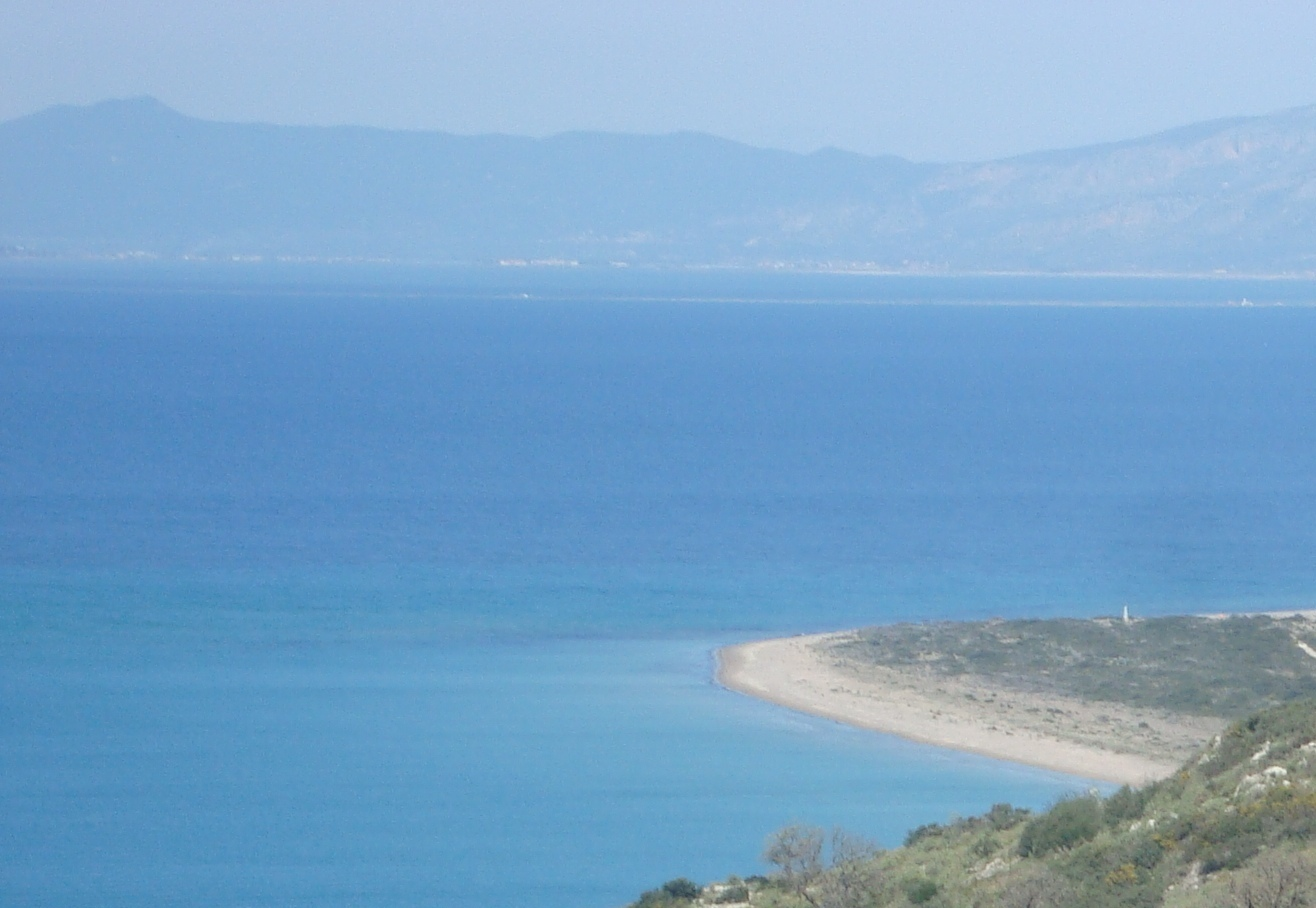
Cape Araxos

Cape Araxos (Greek: Ακρωτήριον Άραξος), also known as Cape Pappas (Άκρα Πάππα), is a cape in the northwest of the Peloponnese in Greece. It is the northwesternmost point of Peloponnese and separates the Gulf of Patras from the Ionian Sea. It lies at a distance of 30 km (19 mi) west of the city of Patras and very close to the village of Akrotirio Araxou. In 1877 a stone lighthouse was built, but it was destroyed during the Second World War and a modern lighthouse was installed after some years. The waters in the area are dangerous because of the continuous additions of sediments, eroding from the uplands of Aetolia-Acarnania via the rivers Acheloos and Evinos, The waters are quite shallow in some parts.

== Naval minefield and shipwrecks ==
During World War II, the area close to the cape was a naval minefield, and there were many losses of ships and human lives. On 29 May 1945, the Dutch cargo ship Mars hit a mine and was sunk. Today it is one of the most well-preserved shipwrecks of the Gulf of Patras.

== Hellenic Navy and Hellenic Coast Guard installations ==
The land around the cape belongs to the Greek Navy which operates a small naval base (Araxos Naval Fort) so the access to the area is restricted same like the navigation without permission closer to a distance of 450 metres (0.28 mi) from the coast. The base hosts the Naval Radio Transmitter Facility of Araxos (Κέντρο Εκπομπής Αράξου). According to Hellenic Coast Guard, in the area operates the cape Pappas RSS (Remote Site Sensor) which is a remotely controlled sensor and radar facility of the national Vessel traffic service system of Greece (Officially called Vessel Traffic Management and Information System).
