= Araxos =

Village in the municipality of West Achaea in Achaea, Greece

Araxos Άραξος
- Community
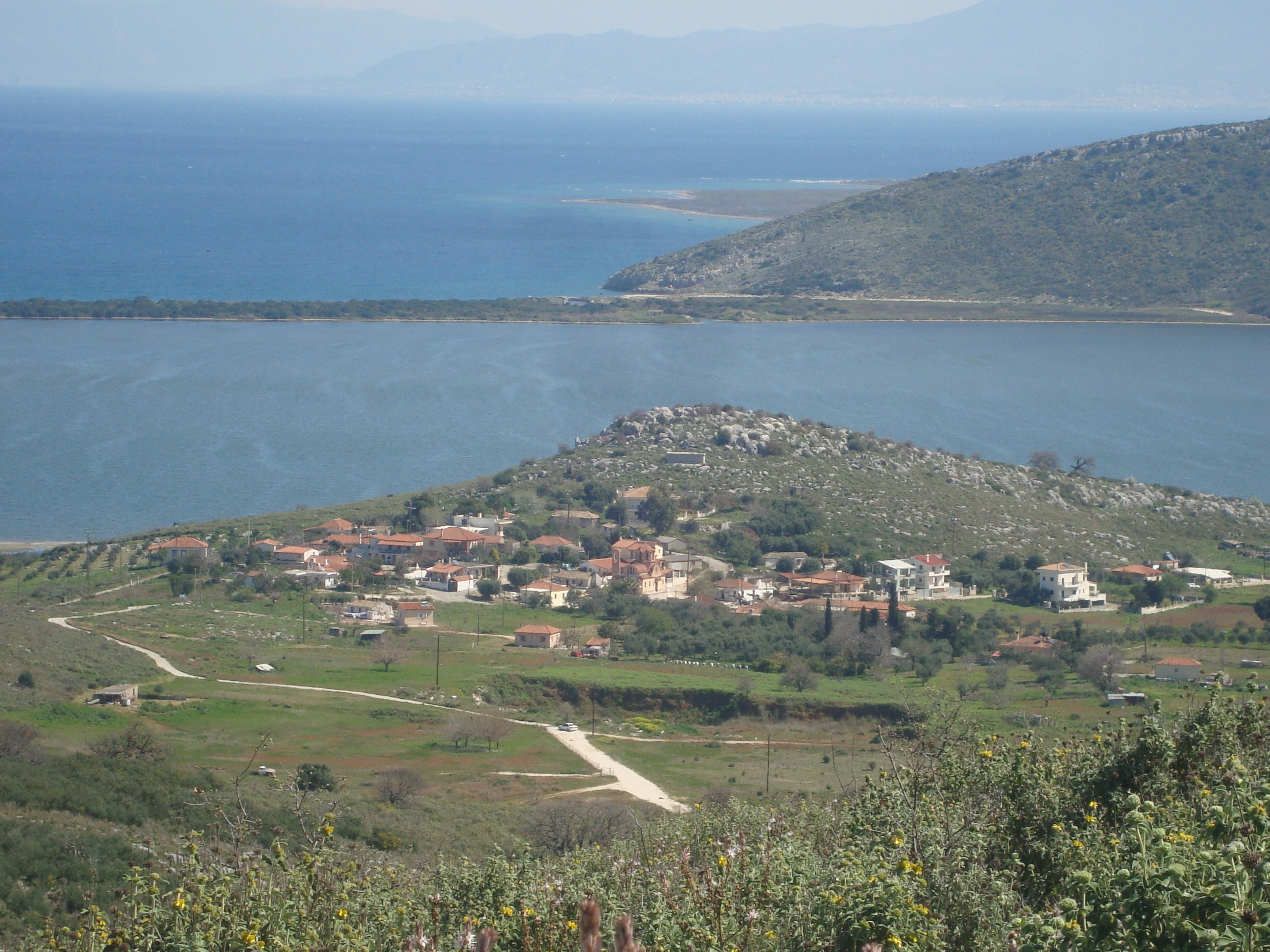

- Location within Greece
- Coordinates: 38°10′N 21°25′E
- Country: Greece
- Administrative region: West Greece
- Regional unit: Achaea
- Municipality: West Achaea
- Municipal unit: Larissos
- Highest elevation: 289 m (948 ft)
- Lowest elevation: 0 m (0 ft)

Population (2021)
  - Community: 218
- Time zone: UTC+2 (EET)
  - Summer (DST): UTC+3 (EEST)
- Postal code: 271 00
- Area code: 26930

Araxos (Greek: Άραξος, Latin: Araxus) is a village and community in Larissos municipal unit, within West Achaea, in northwestern Achaea, Greece. It is located about 29 km southwest of Patras. The community of Araxos consists of the villages of Araxos, Akrotirio Araxos, and Taxiarches. Araxos is located in the coastal plains near Cape Araxos, which separates the Gulf of Patras from the Ionian Sea.

The Prokopos lagoon is to the southwest of the Araxos village and Kalogria (or Pappas or Araxos) lagoon is to the north. Also to the north are the Mavra Vouna hills, with Cape Araxos as their northernmost point. Araxos is 4 km west of Lakkopetra, 1 km west of Araxos Airport, 5 km north of Metochi, and 13 km west of Kato Achaia.

== Strofilia Wetlands Natural Park ==
The Strofilia Wetlands Natural Park and Kalogria Beach are on the northwest coast of the island. Strofilia is a 22 km^{2} (8.5 sq mi) national park within the Natura 2000 network and is protected under the Ramsar Convention. The wetlands ecosystem occupies a coastal zone of about 22 km (14 mi) in length, with an average width of 1.5 km (0.93 mi). The ecosystem includes the lagoons of Prokopos and Kalogria (or Pappas), the Lamia marshes, and the forest of Strofilia (Natura 2000 codes: GR 232001 and GR233006). Strofilia's Stone pine forest is the most extensive Stone Pine forest in Greece, and one of the largest in Europe. Most of the forest consists of sand dune formations.

== Historical population ==
Year	Population community
1981	595
1991	403
2001	632
2011	509
2021	218

== Climate ==
Climate data for Araxos (1955-2010) HNMS
Month	Jan	Feb	Mar	Apr	May	Jun	Jul	Aug	Sep	Oct	Nov	Dec	Year
Mean daily maximum °C (°F)	13.8 (56.8)	14.2 (57.6)	16.1 (61.0)	19.3 (66.7)	24.2 (75.6)	28.5 (83.3)	31.3 (88.3)	31.6 (88.9)	28.0 (82.4)	23.5 (74.3)	18.9 (66.0)	15.2 (59.4)	22.1 (71.7)
Daily mean °C (°F)	10.2 (50.4)	10.5 (50.9)	12.3 (54.1)	15.4 (59.7)	20.0 (68.0)	24.3 (75.7)	26.9 (80.4)	27.0 (80.6)	23.4 (74.1)	19.1 (66.4)	14.8 (58.6)	11.6 (52.9)	18.0 (64.3)
Mean daily minimum °C (°F)	6.2 (43.2)	6.3 (43.3)	7.6 (45.7)	9.8 (49.6)	13.3 (55.9)	16.8 (62.2)	19.0 (66.2)	19.8 (67.6)	17.2 (63.0)	14.2 (57.6)	10.6 (51.1)	7.8 (46.0)	12.4 (54.3)
Average precipitation mm (inches)	93.2 (3.67)	78.7 (3.10)	61.8 (2.43)	43.6 (1.72)	20.1 (0.79)	8.6 (0.34)	4.1 (0.16)	5.9 (0.23)	33.1 (1.30)	83.8 (3.30)	129.9 (5.11)	121.2 (4.77)	684 (26.92)
Average precipitation days	13.7	12.4	11.6	9.1	6.0	2.6	0.9	1.2	5.1	9.4	12.6	15.9	100.5
Average relative humidity (%)	74.2	72.9	72.4	71.6	68.5	62.6	59.0	59.7	65.7	70.1	76.1	76.3	69.1
Source: HNMS (1955-2010 averages)

== Araxos Air Base ==

An auxiliary military airfield was constructed in the Araxos area in 1939. Construction of a corresponding military base began around 1958, and the base became operational in 1962. Currently, the base is used by the 116 Combat Wing of the Hellenic Air Force, which consists of the 335 Bombing Squadron and the 336 Bombing Squadron, both equipped with F-16C/D Block 52+ aircraft. The runway is 3352 m long, running in a south-to-north direction (18/36). The military installations are accessed from Lakkopetra.

From 1978 to 2001, Araxos Air Base was also home to the NATO 345 Air Munitions Company. This unit was responsible for the U.S. B61 nuclear bombs intended for delivery by Hellenic Air Force A-7H aircraft under NATO nuclear sharing arrangements. The nuclear weapons were stored in vaults inside the base's Hardened Aircraft Shelters using the WS3 Weapon Storage and Security System.

=== Araxos Airport ===
Araxos Airport (IATA: GPA, ICAO: LGRX) is a civilian airport that shares its runway with the Araxos Air Base. It is the closest airport to the large city of Patras.

== Gallery ==
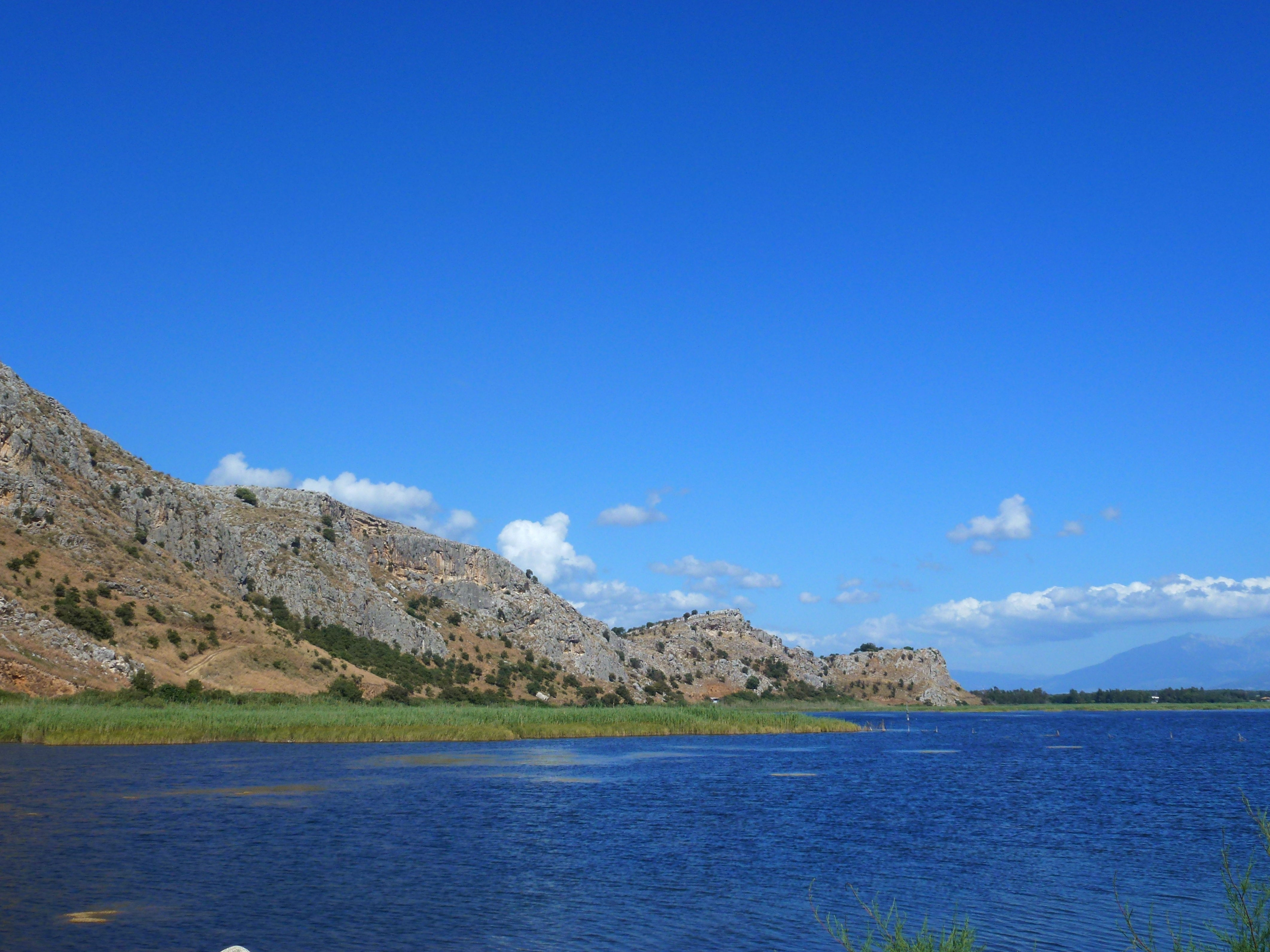
Prokopos Lagoon.

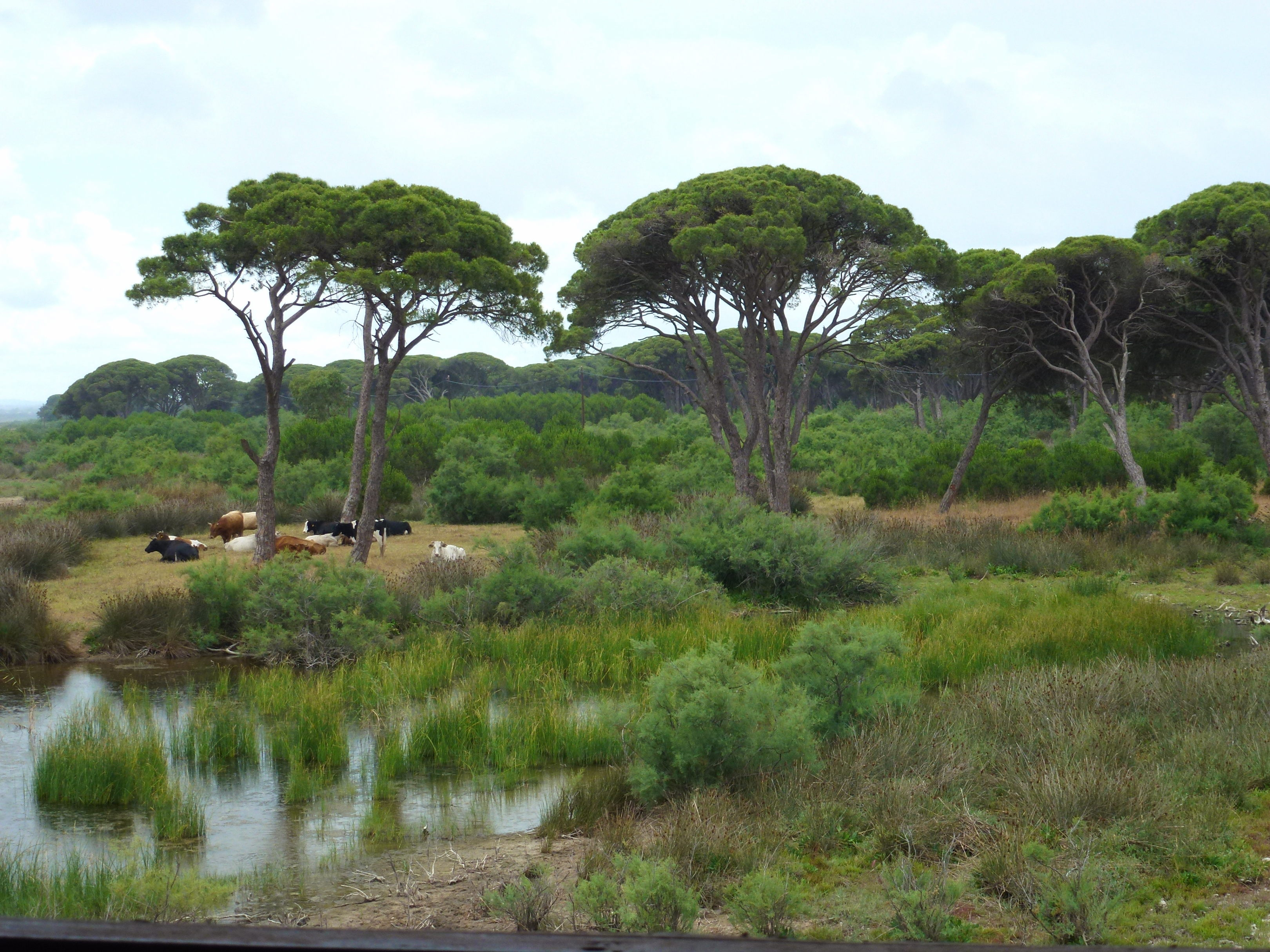
Kalogria (Prokopos) Lagoon Shore.

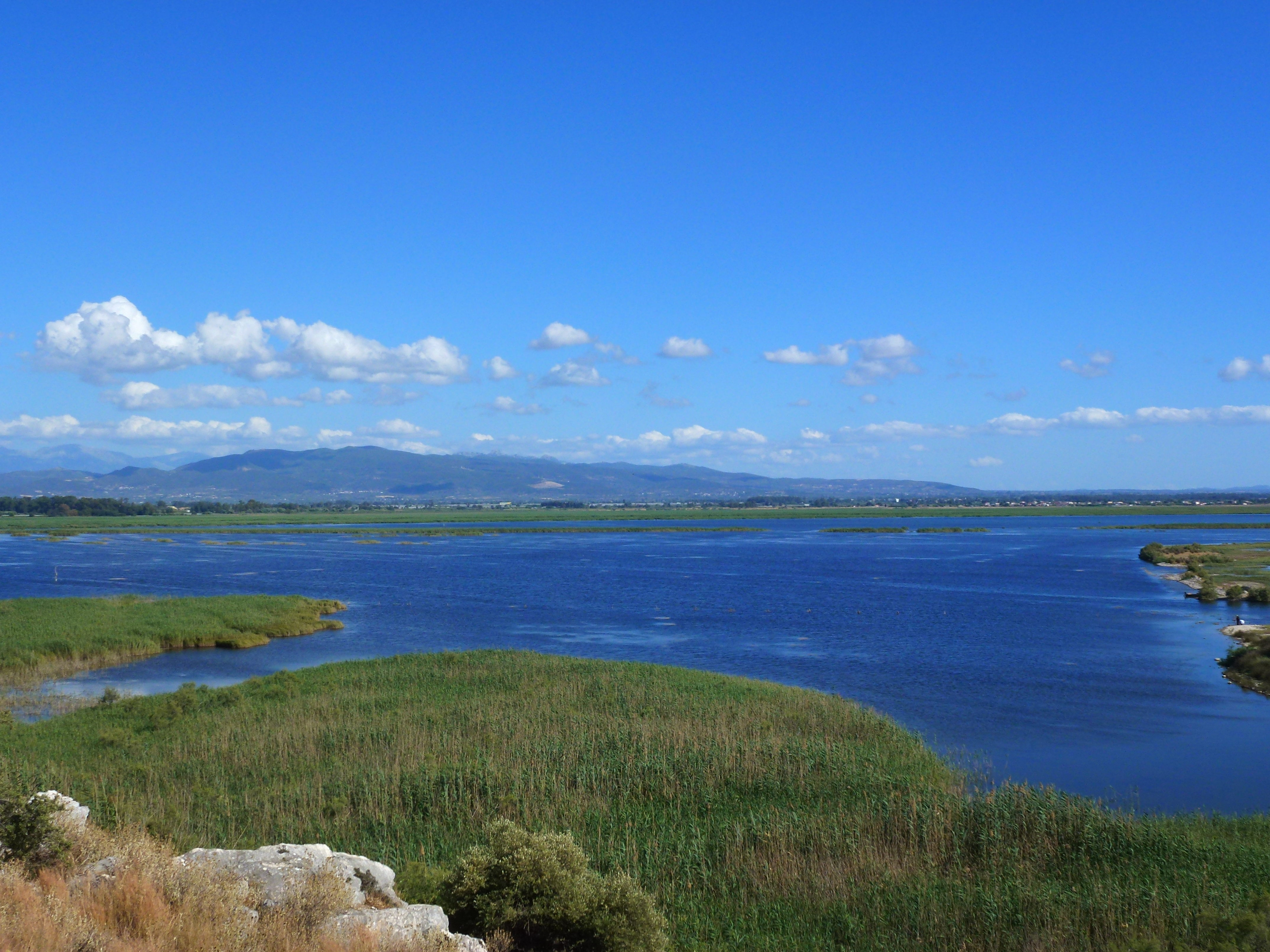
Prokopos Lagoon Panorama.

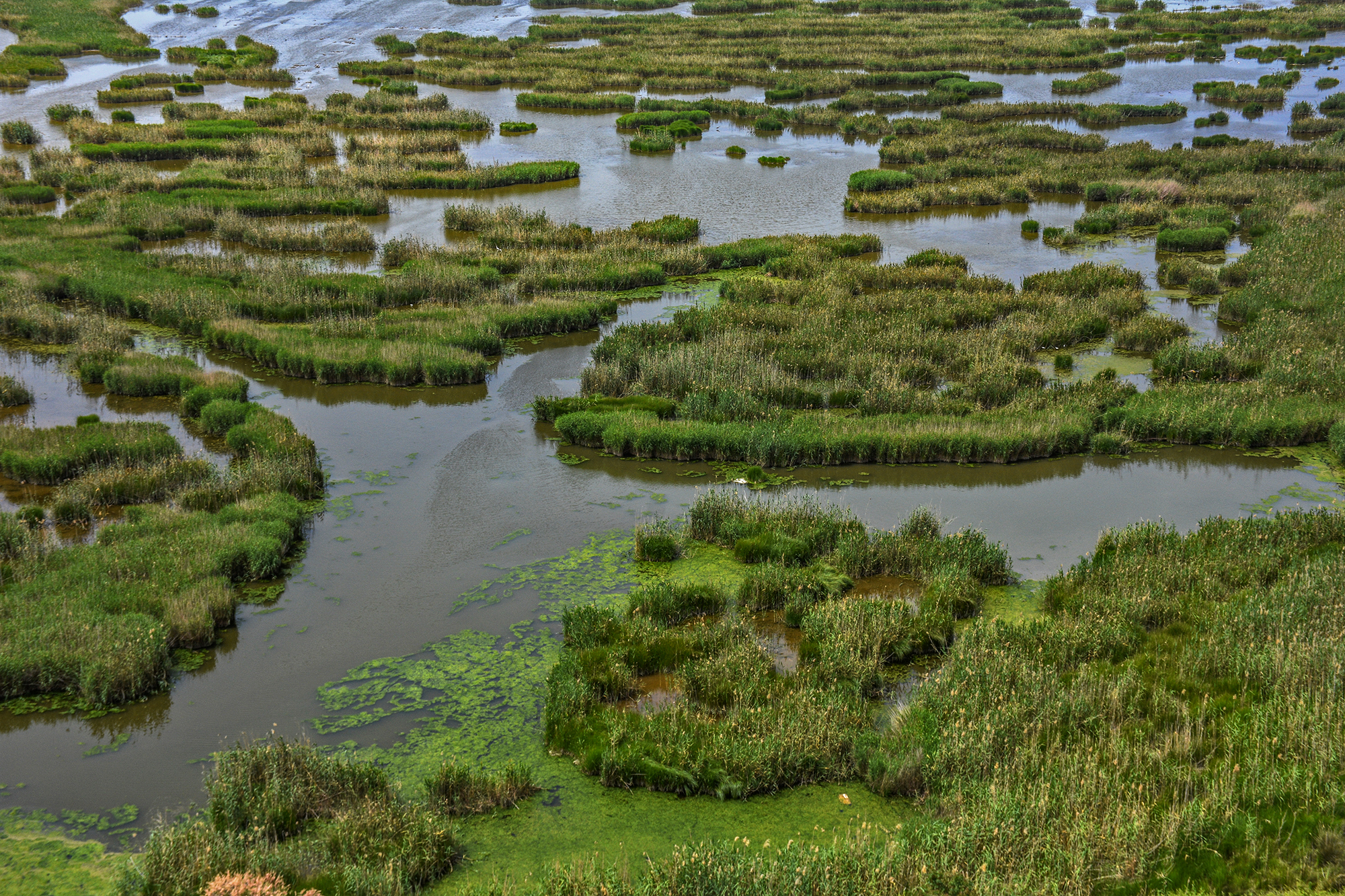
Partial panoramic view of Prokopos Lagoon within Strofylia Forrest, near Araxos village, Kalogria Village, Kalogria beach and Araxos Cape in Western Achaia, Greece.

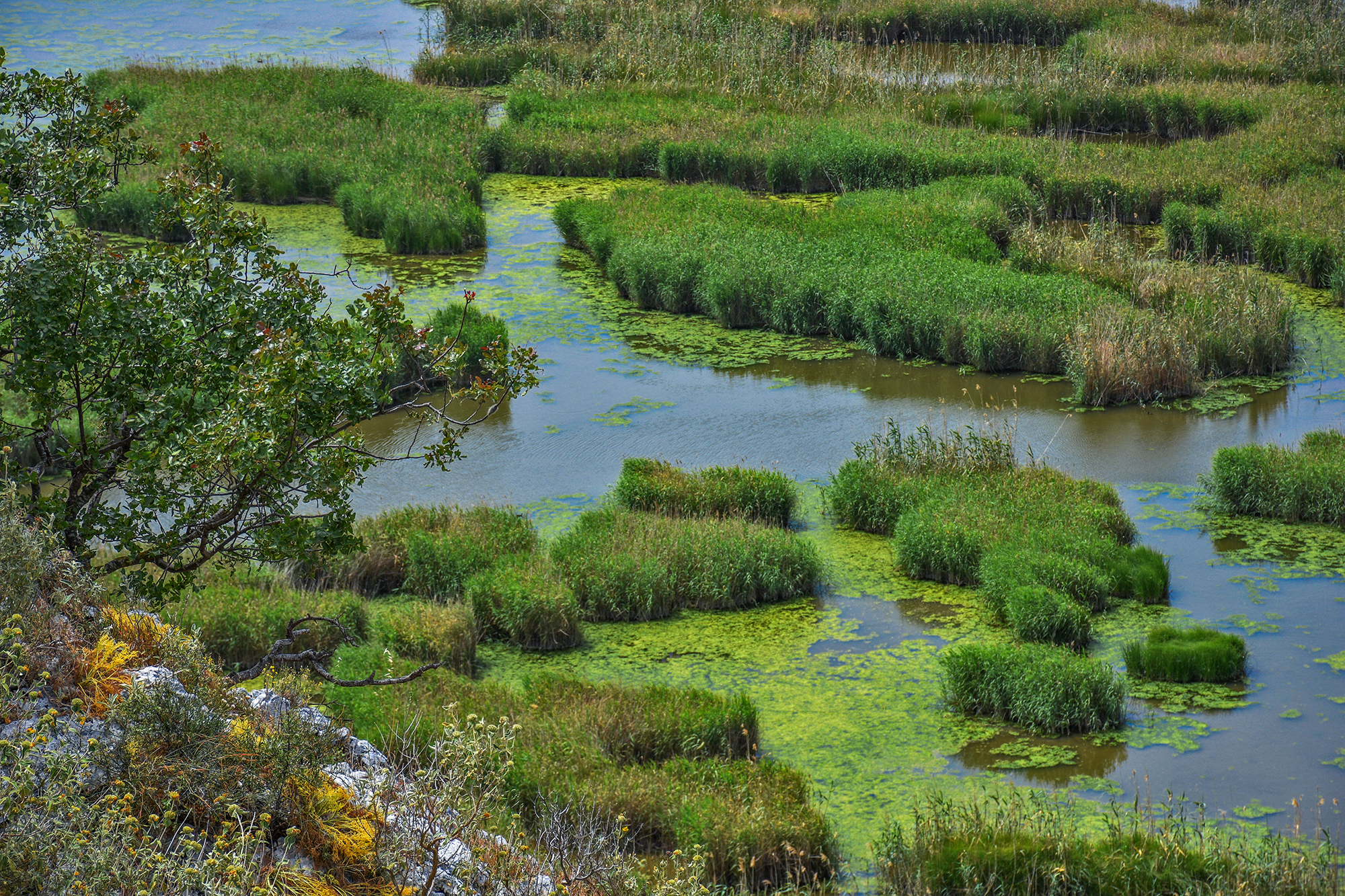
Partial panoramic view of Prokopos Lagoon.

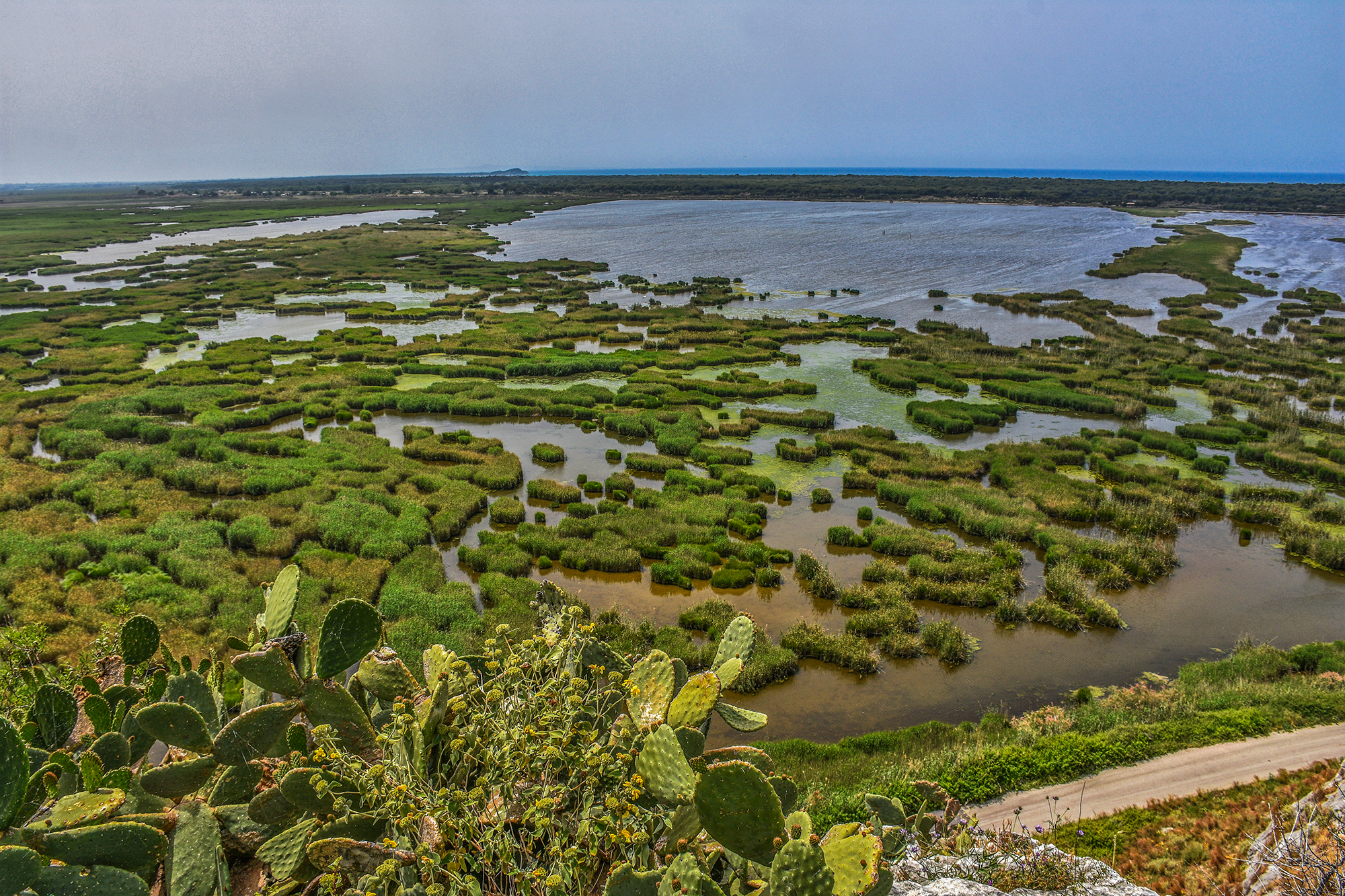
Partial panoramic view of Prokopos Lagoon.

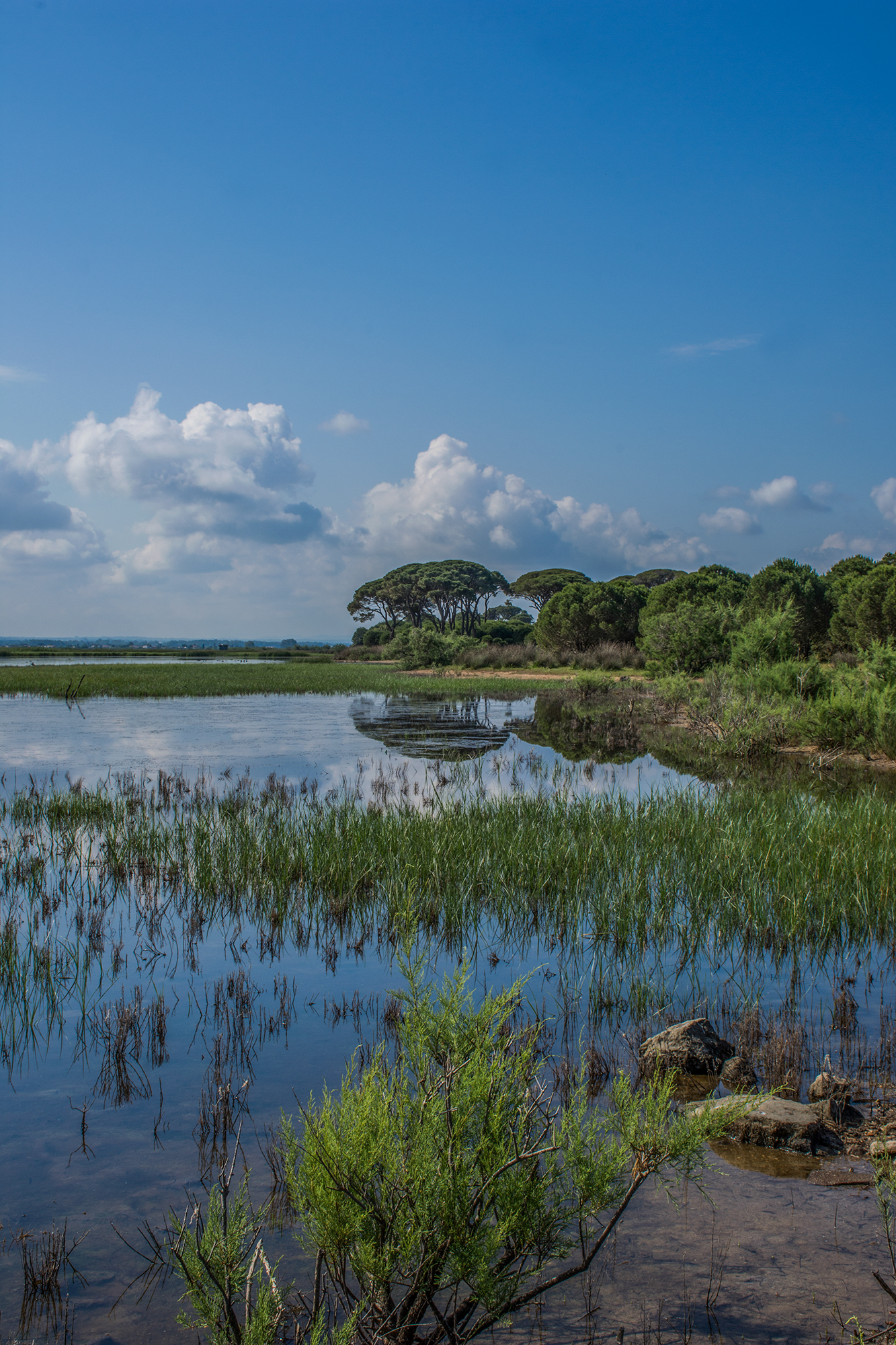
Partial view of Prokopos Lagoon.

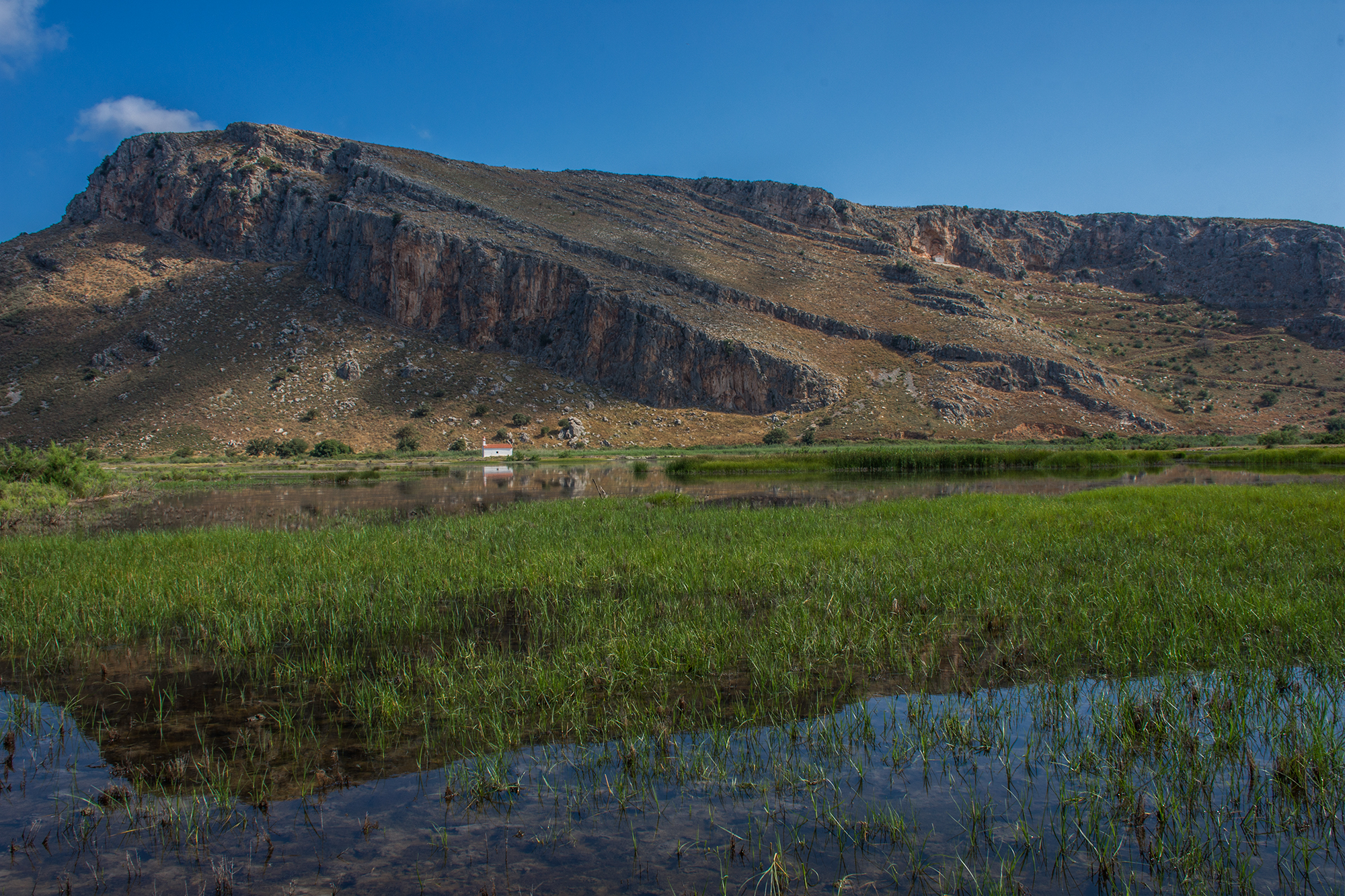
Partial view of Prokopos Lagoon.

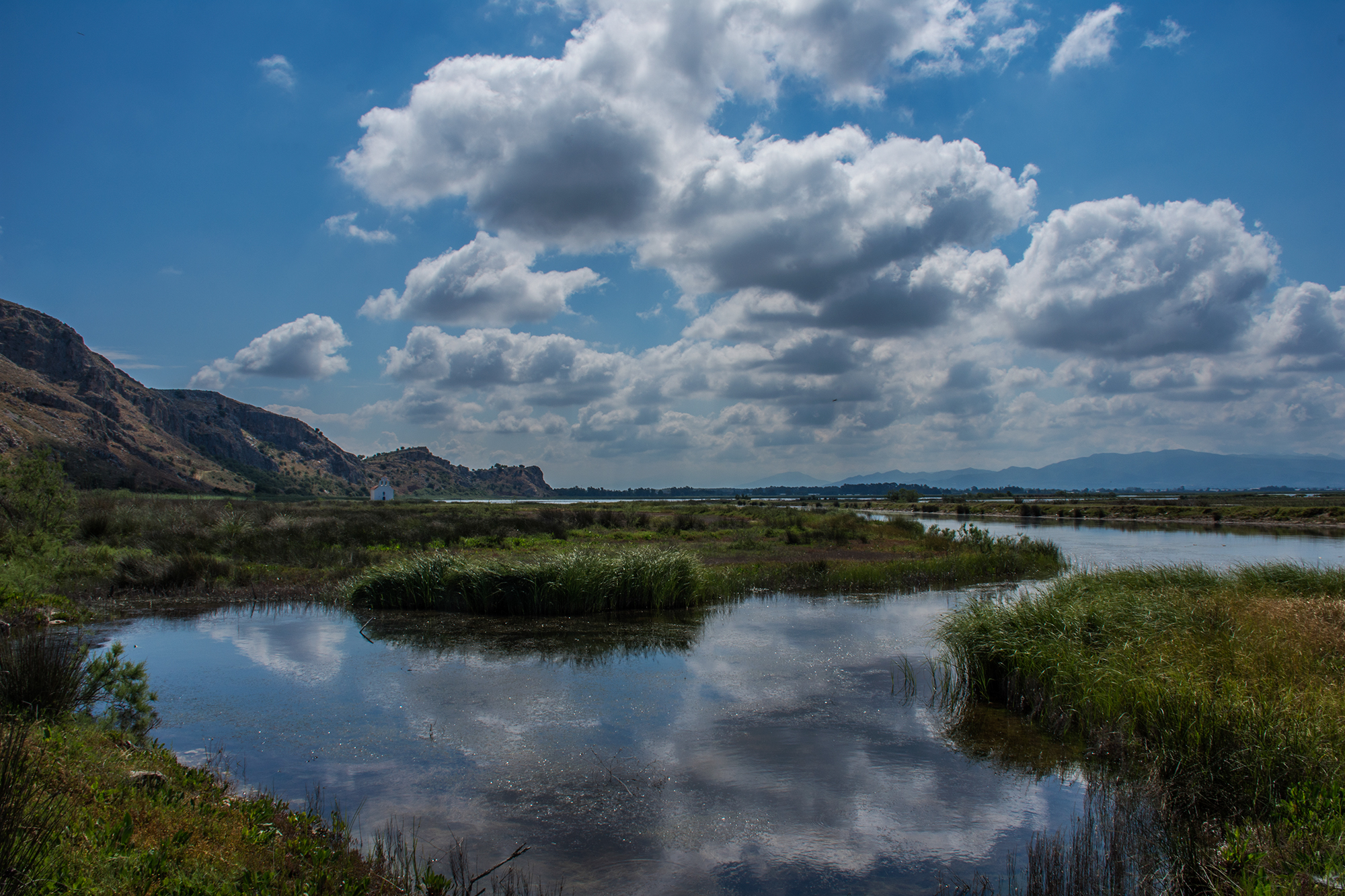
Partial view of Prokopos Lagoon.

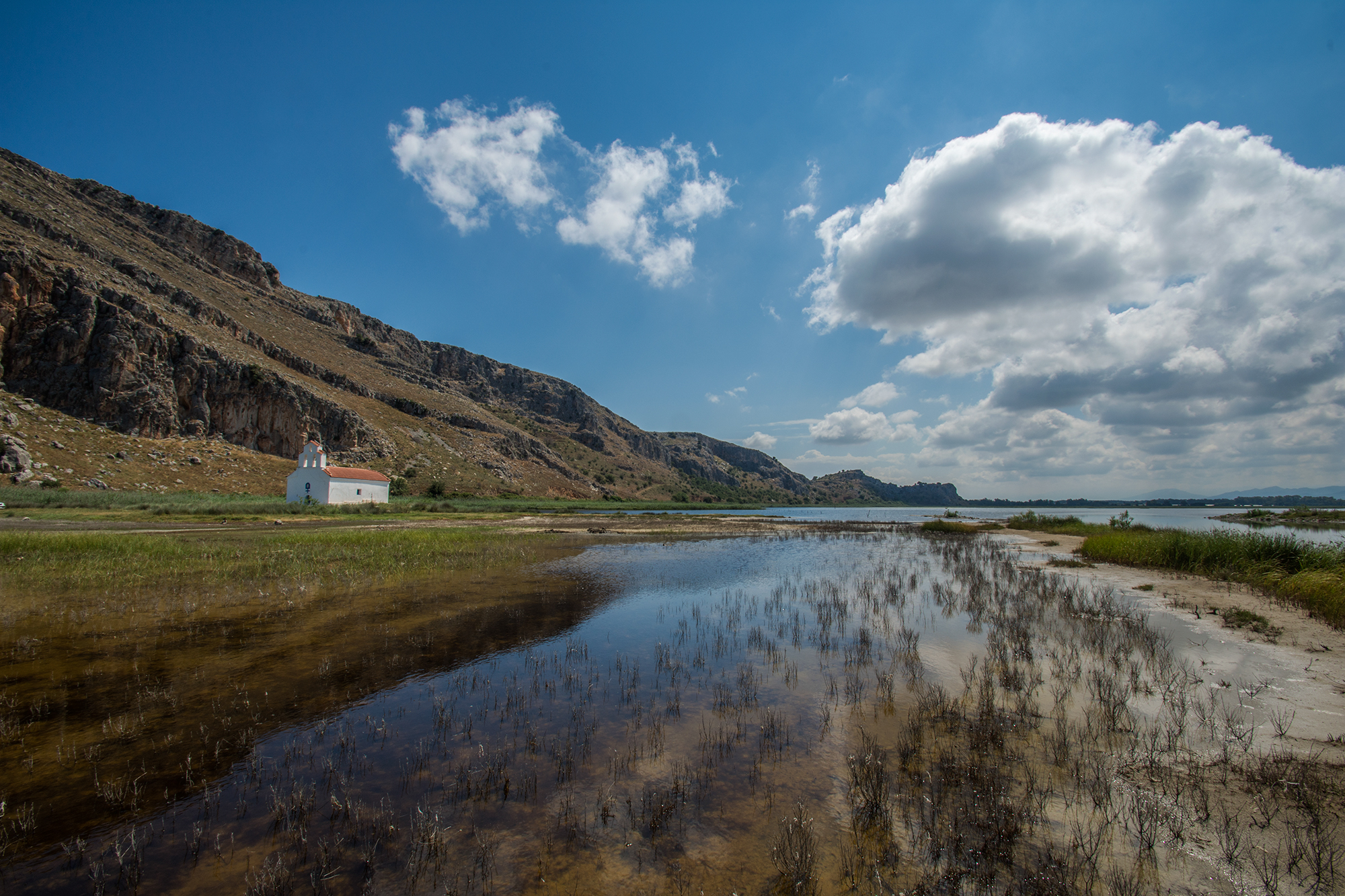
Partial view of Prokopos Lagoon.

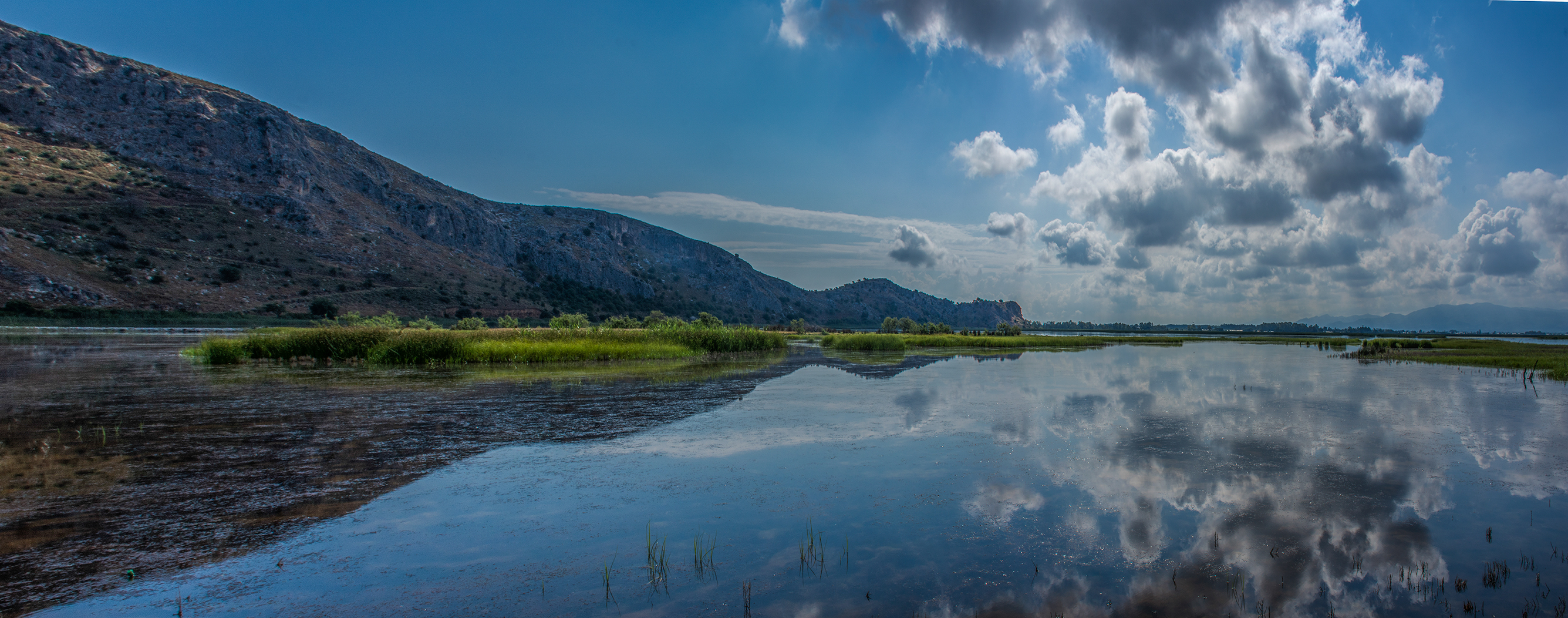
Panoramic view of Prokopos Lagoon.

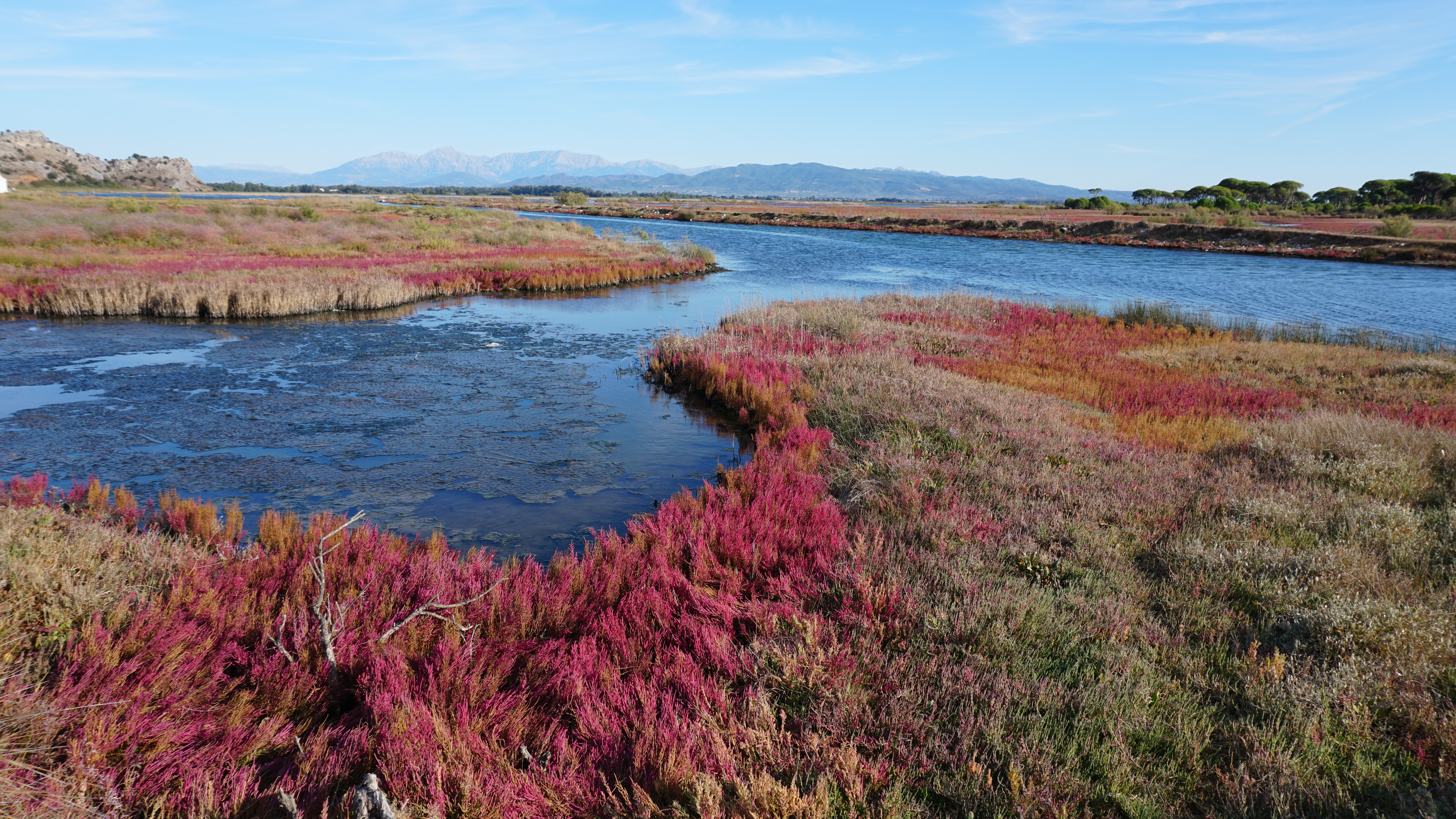
Partial view of Prokopos Lagoon.

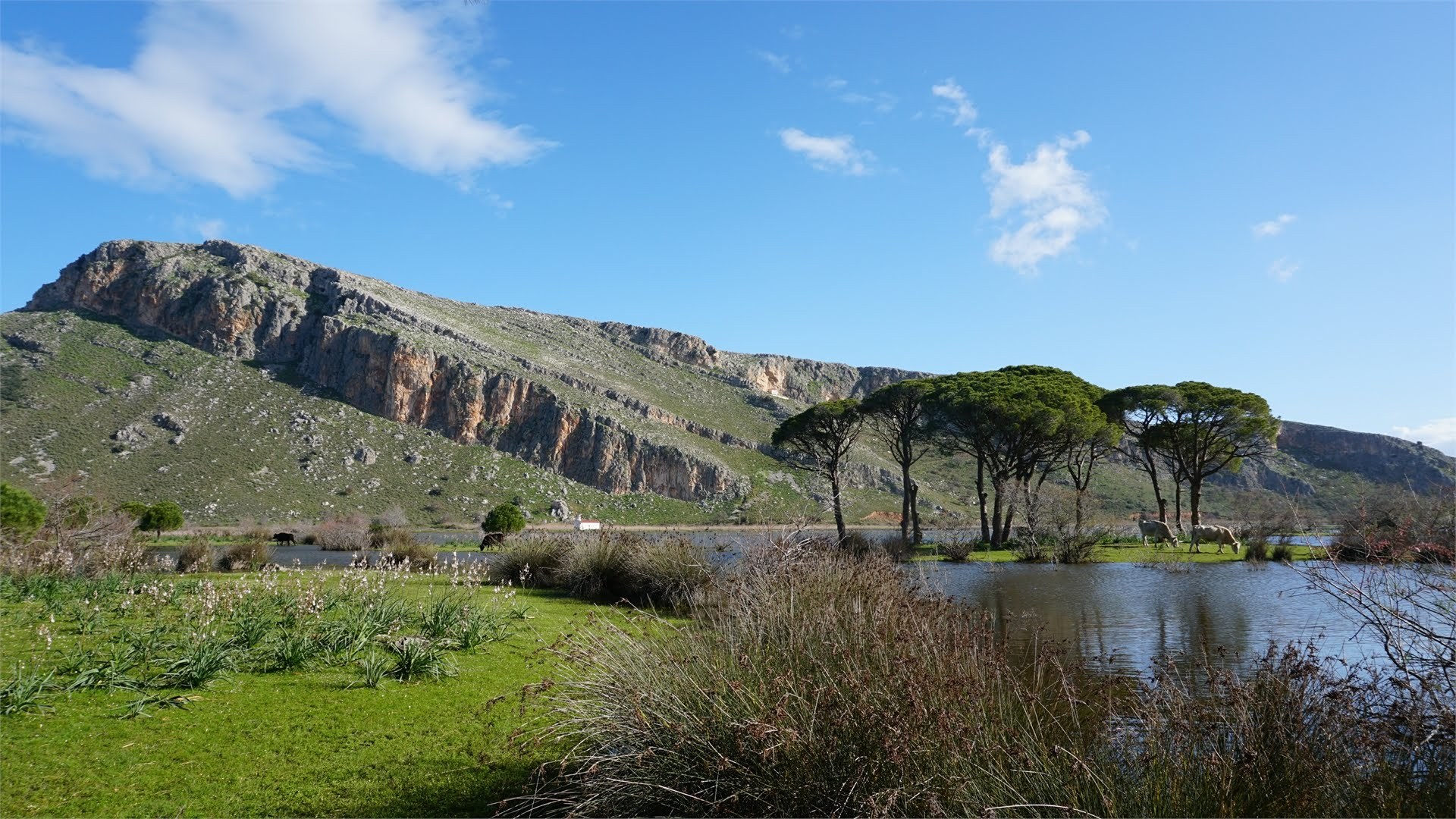
Partial view of Prokopos Lagoon.

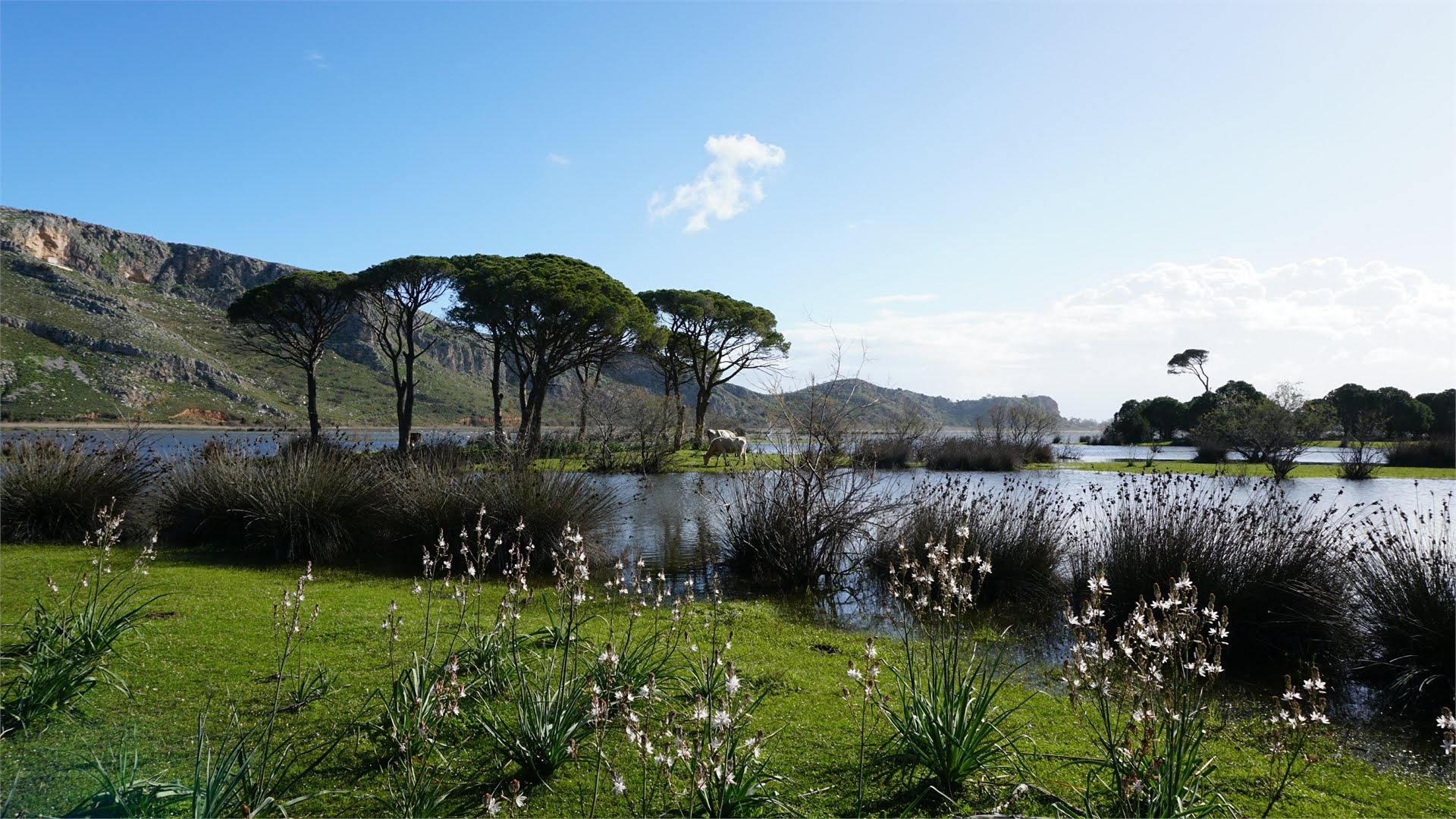
Partial view of Prokopos Lagoon.

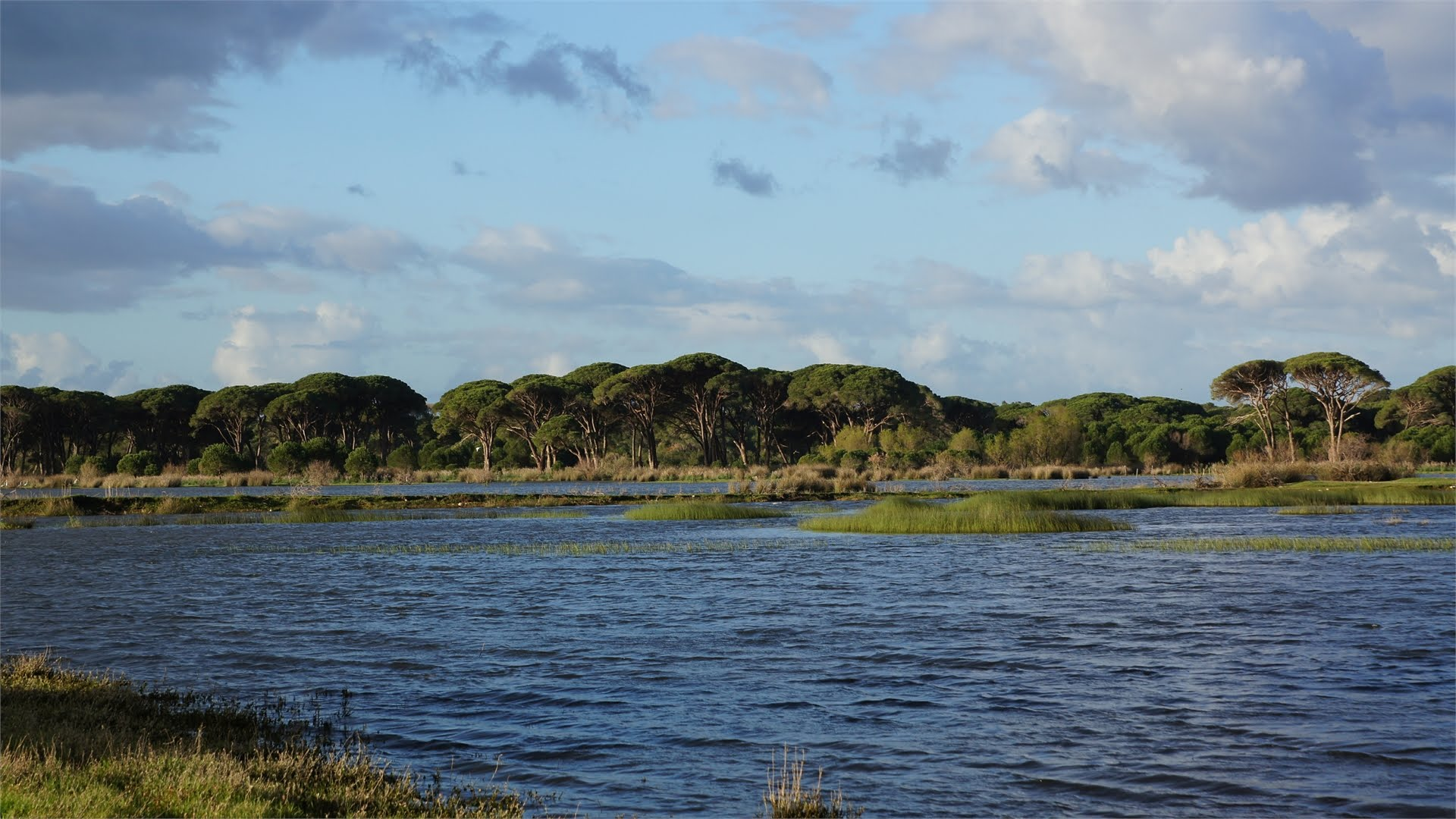
Partial view of Prokopos Lagoon.

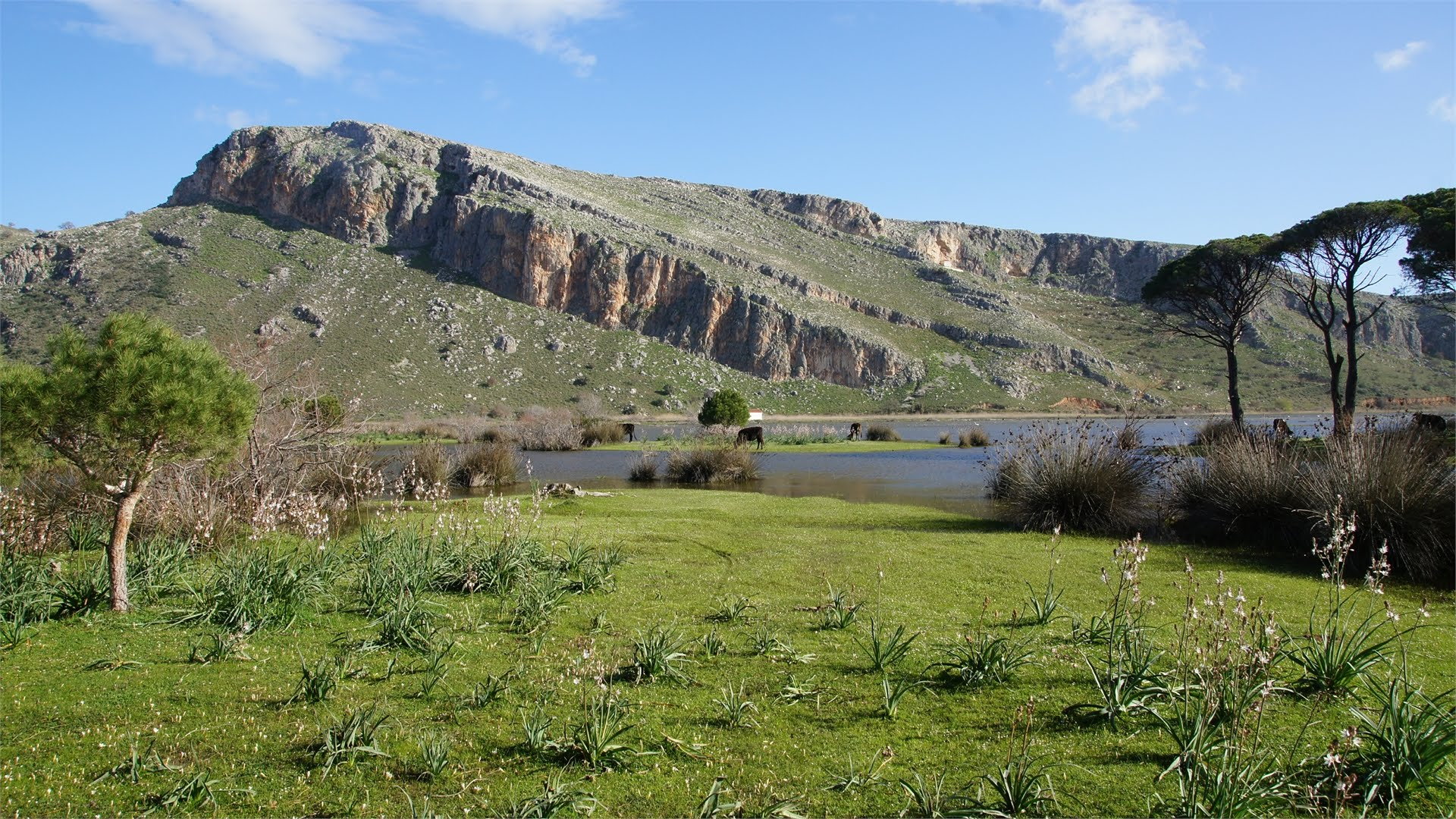
Partial view of Prokopos Lagoon.

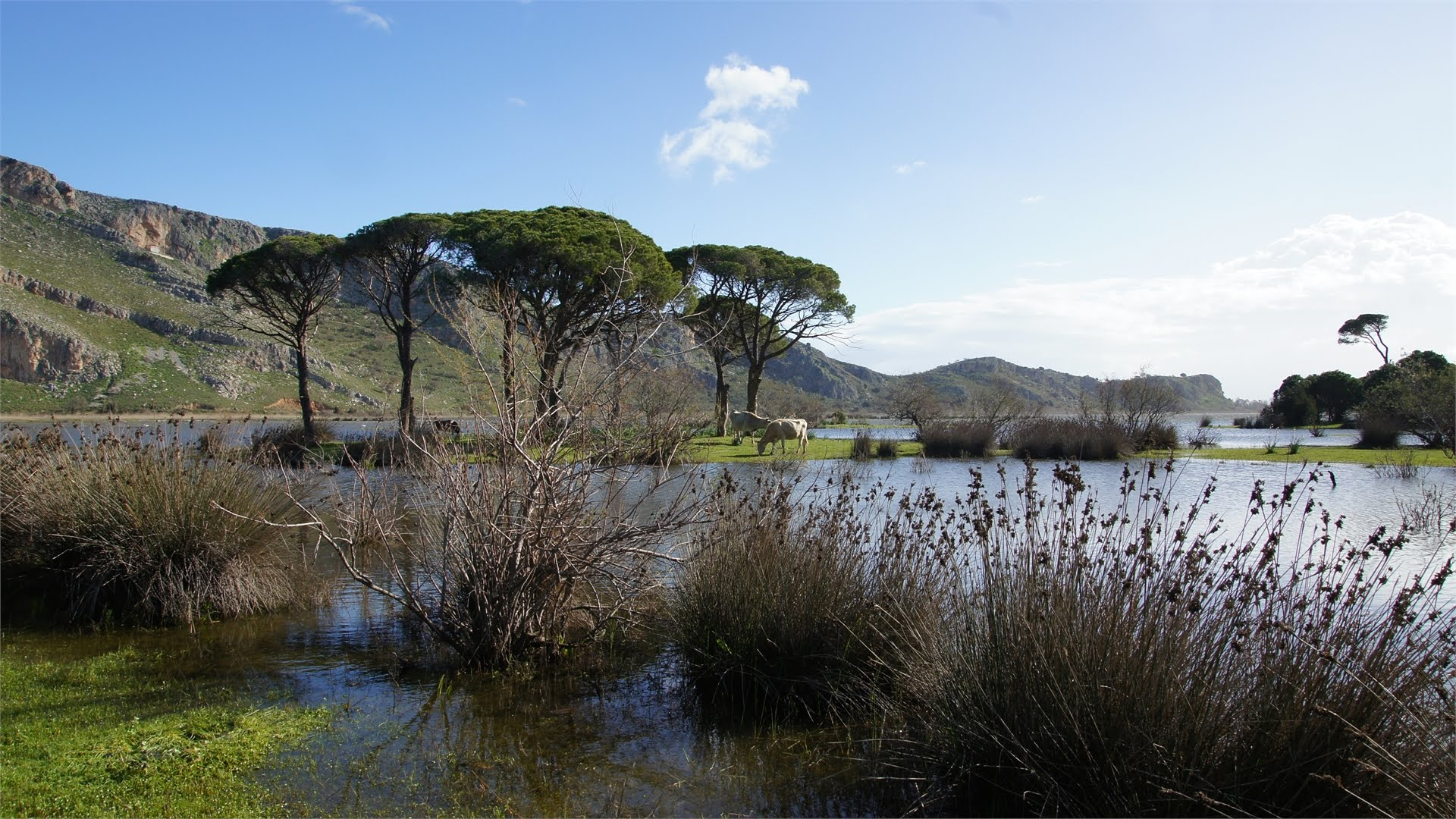
Partial view of Prokopos Lagoon.

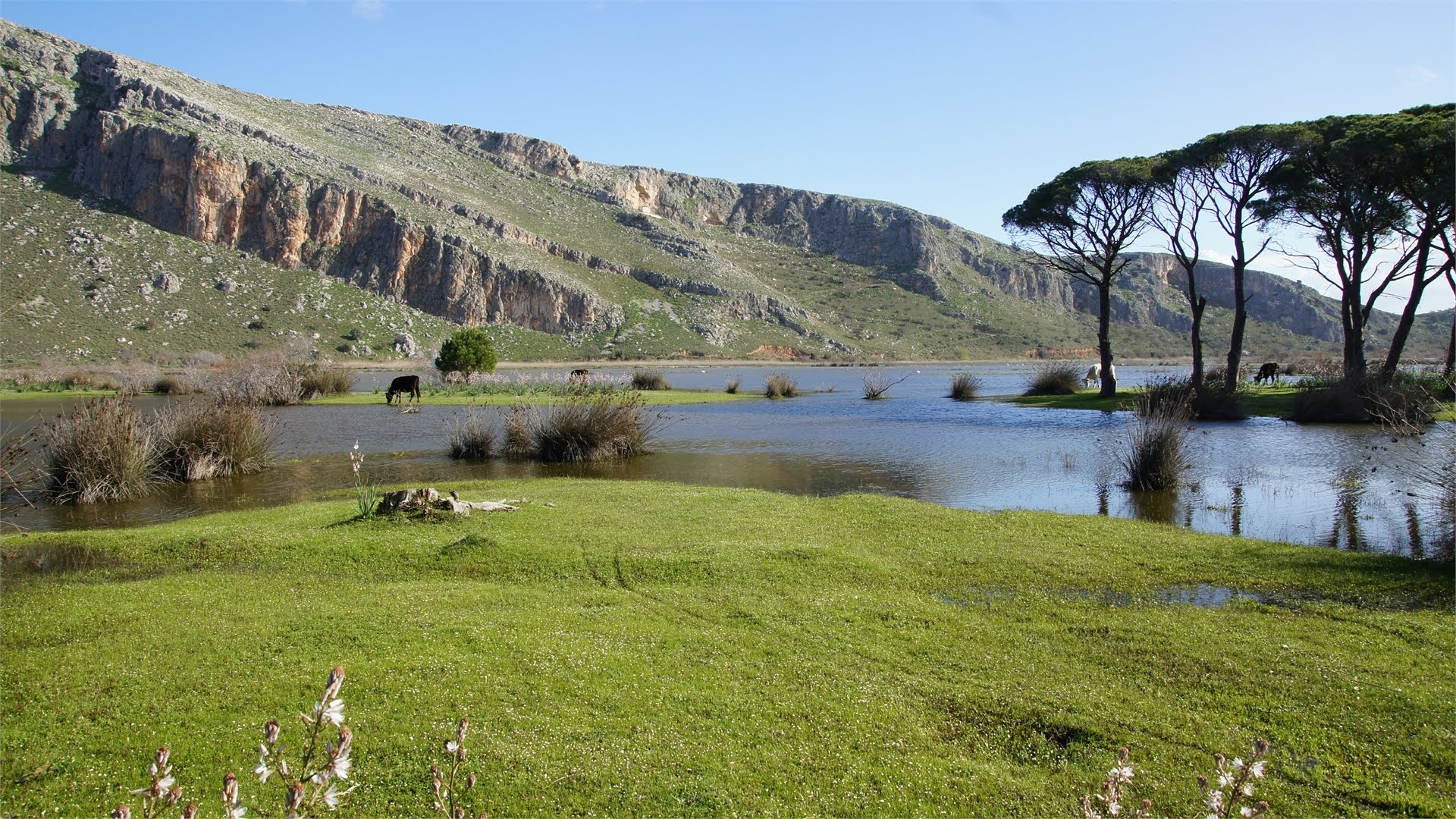
Partial view of Prokopos Lagoon.

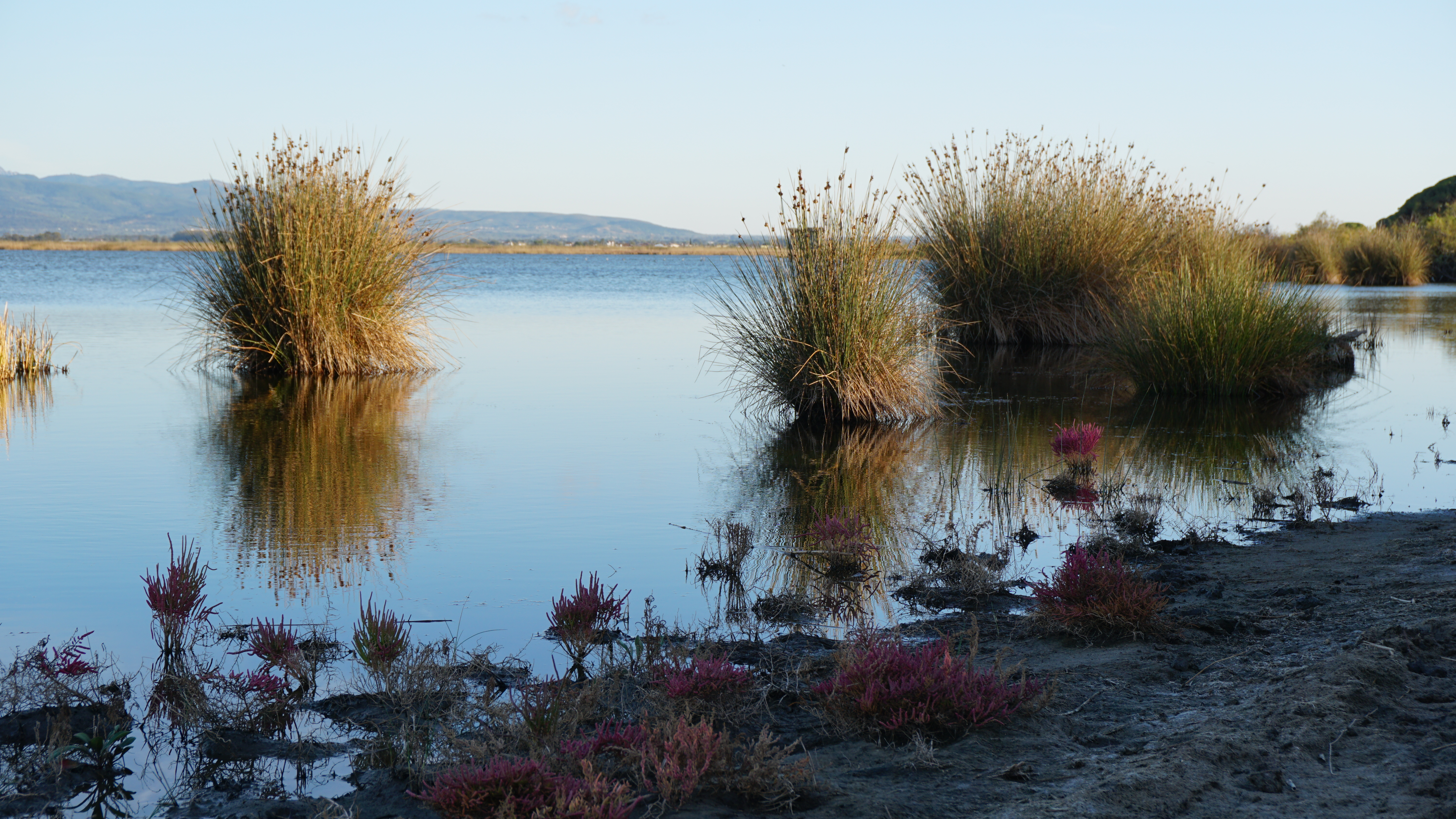
Partial view of Prokopos Lagoon.

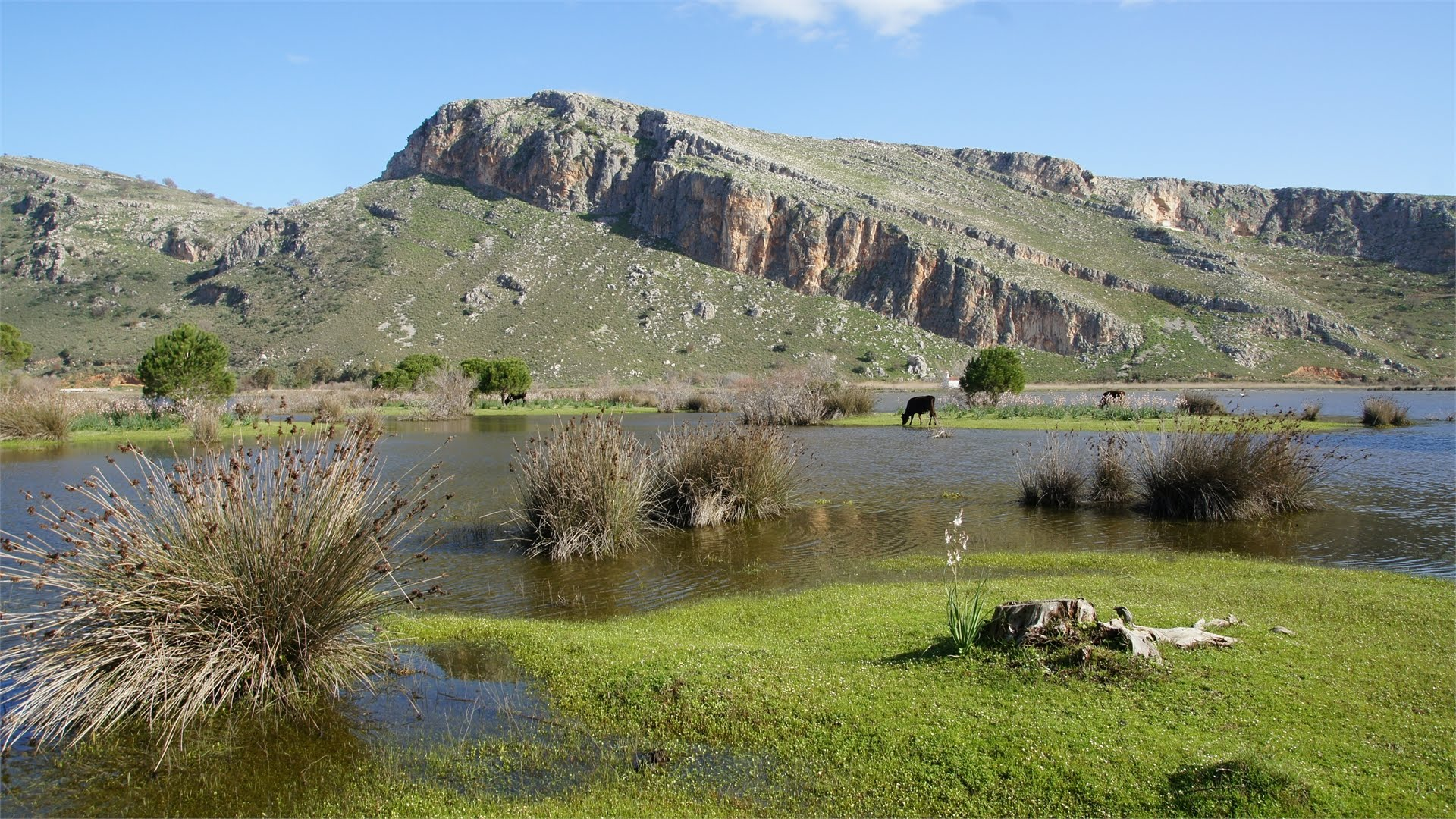
Partial view of Prokopos Lagoon.

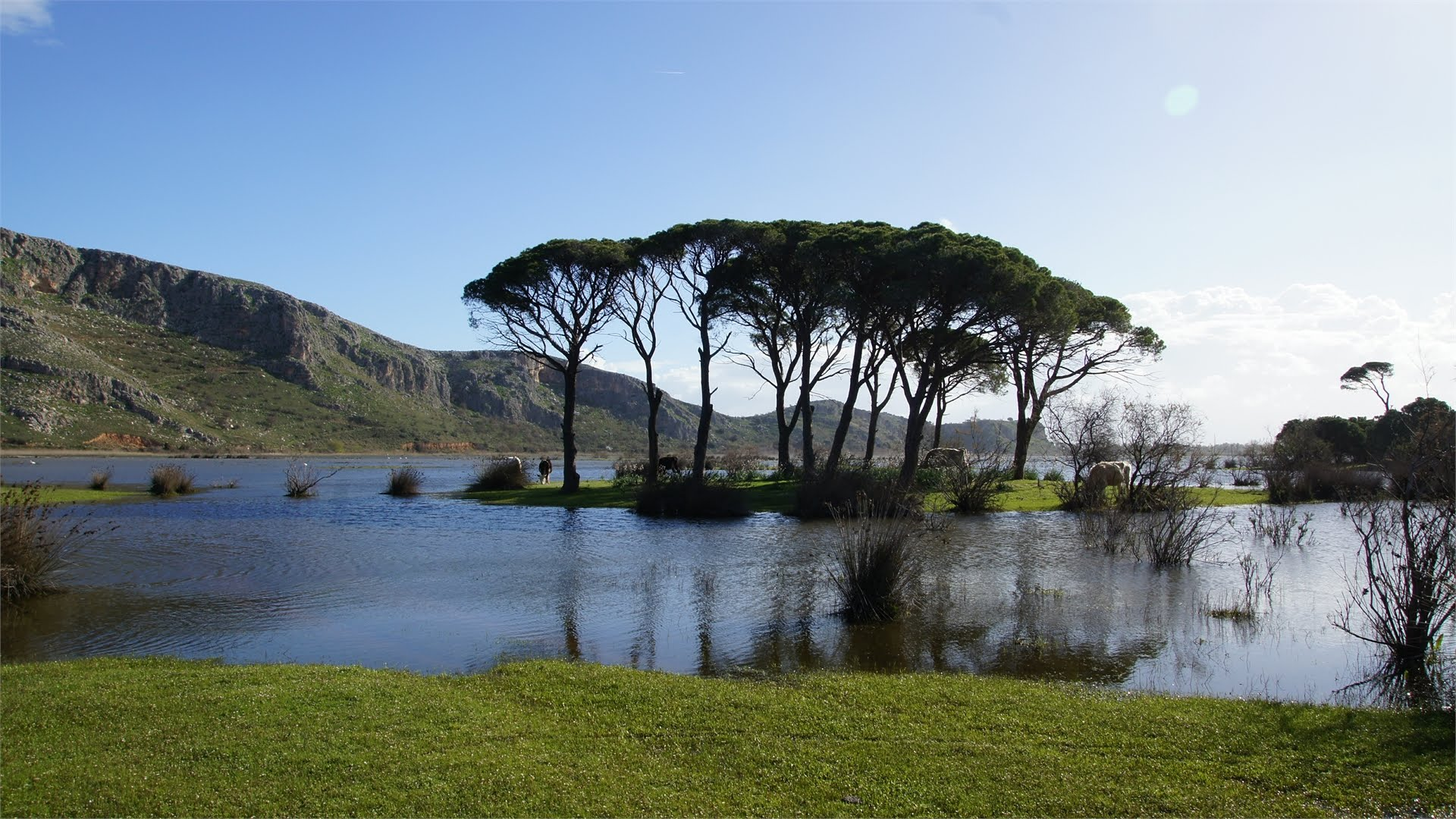
The Umbrella pine (Pinus pinea) forest of Strofylia and the Prokopos lagoon.

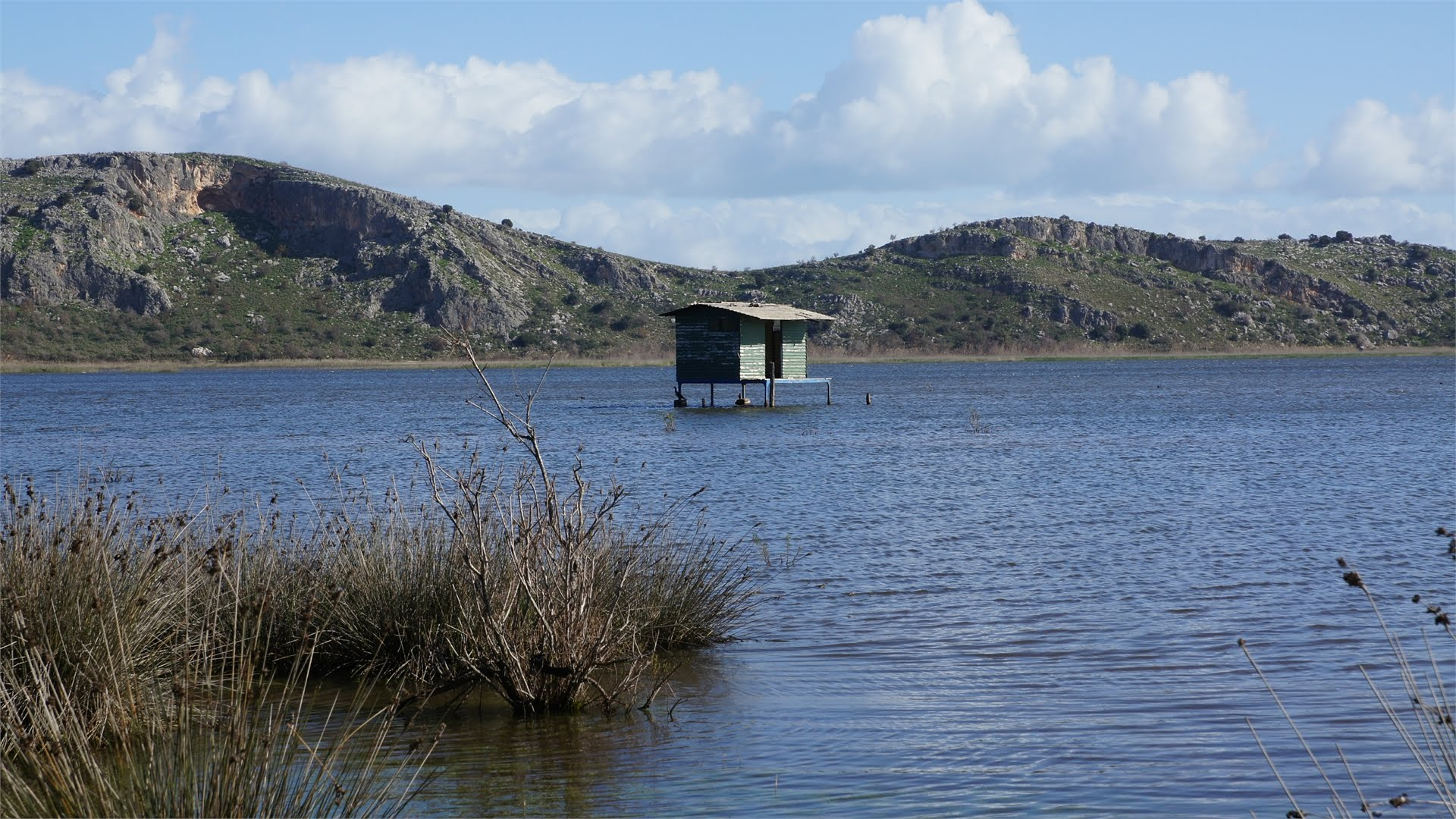
Partial view of Prokopos Lagoon.

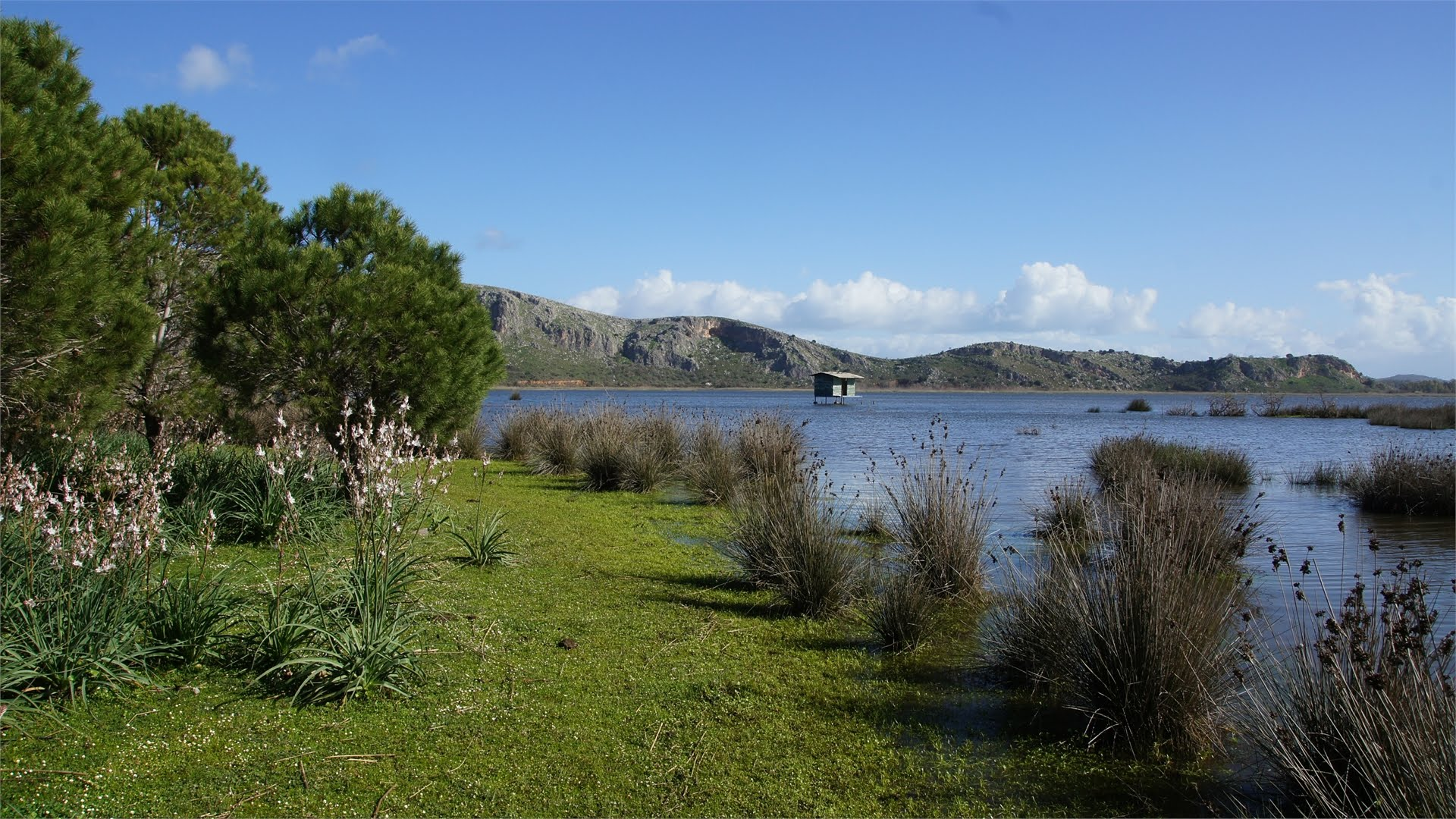
Partial view of Prokopos Lagoon.

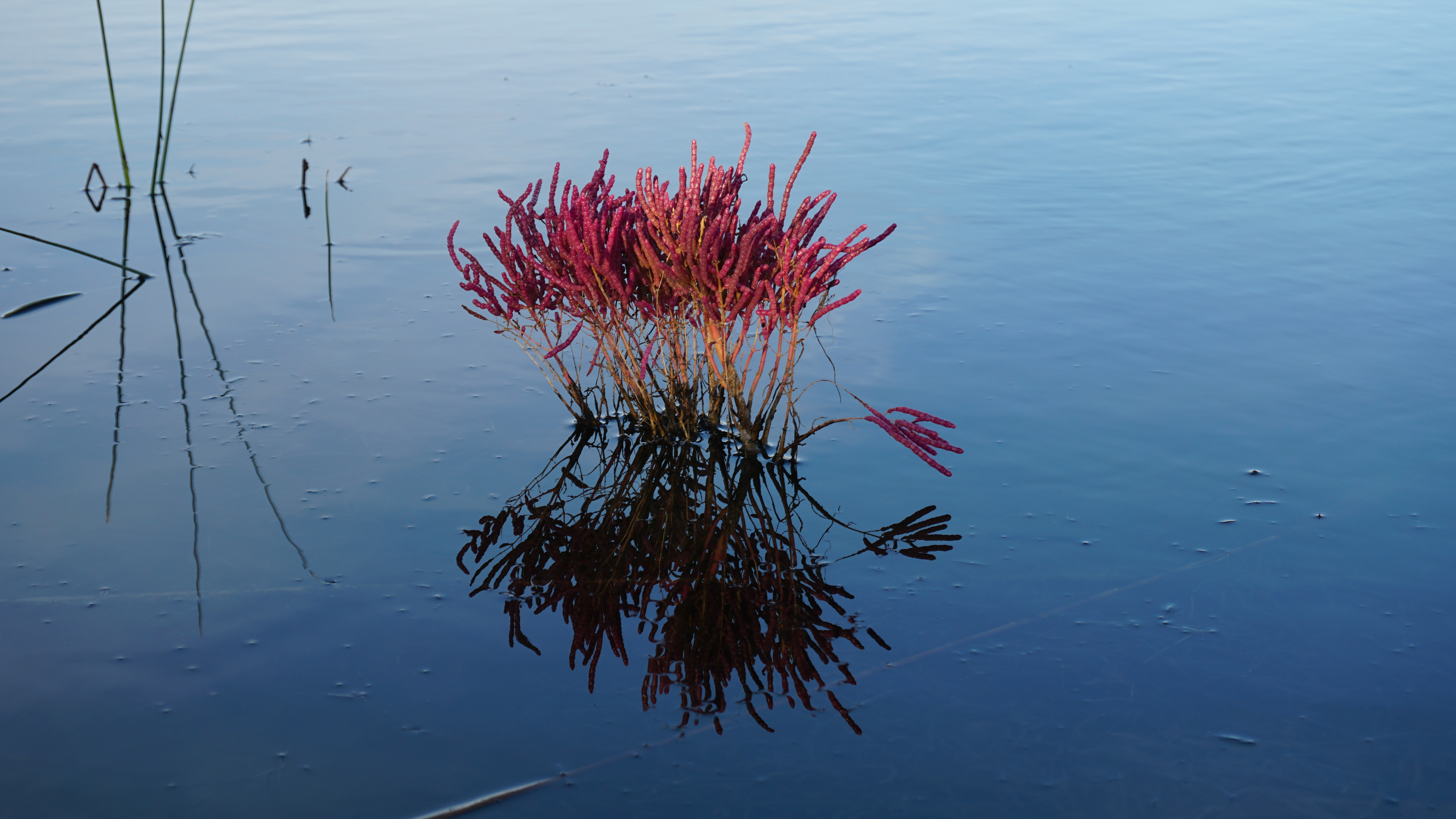
Halocnemum strobilaceum in Prokopos Lagoon.

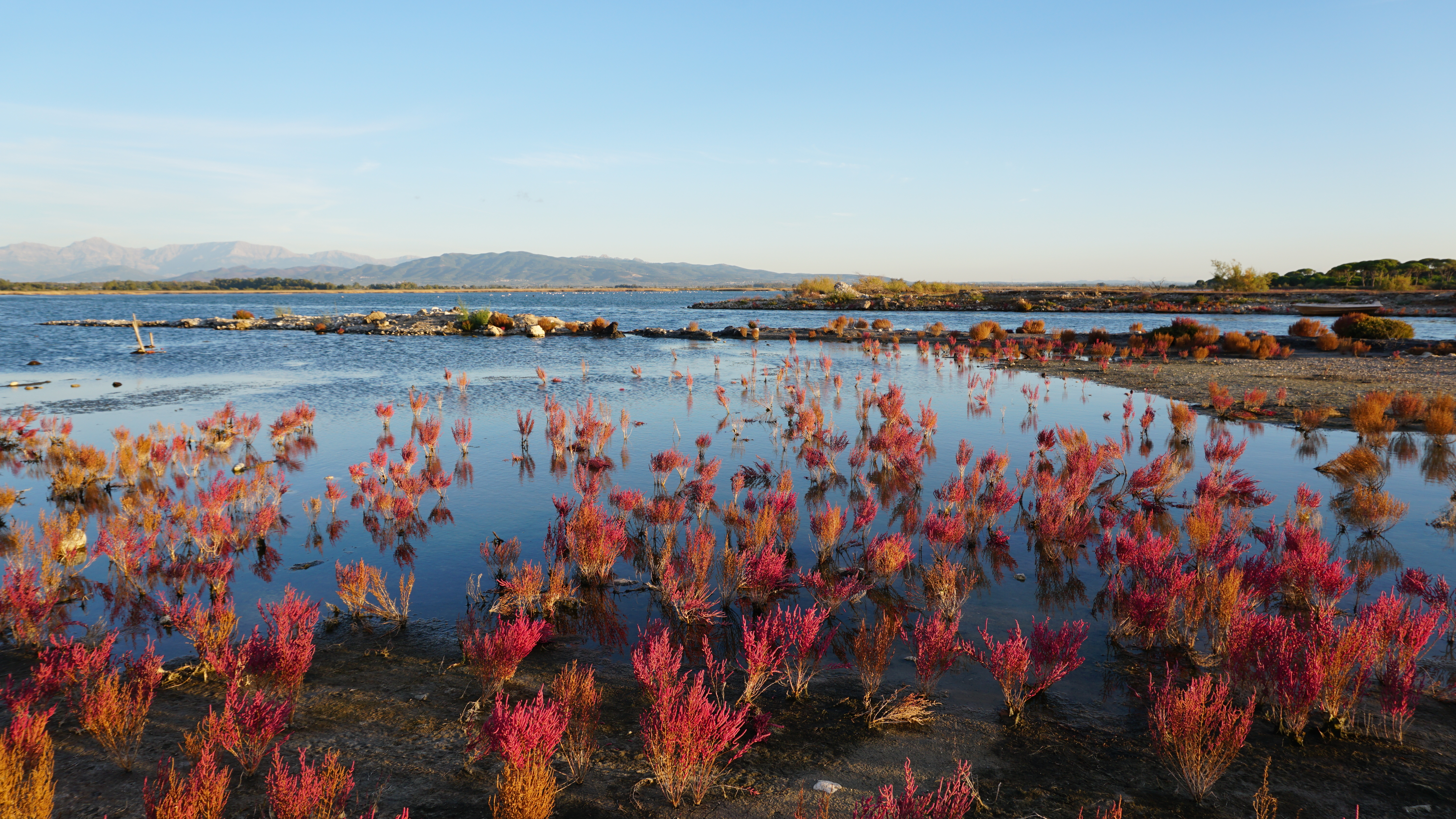
Partial view of Prokopos Lagoon with Halocnemum strobilaceum.

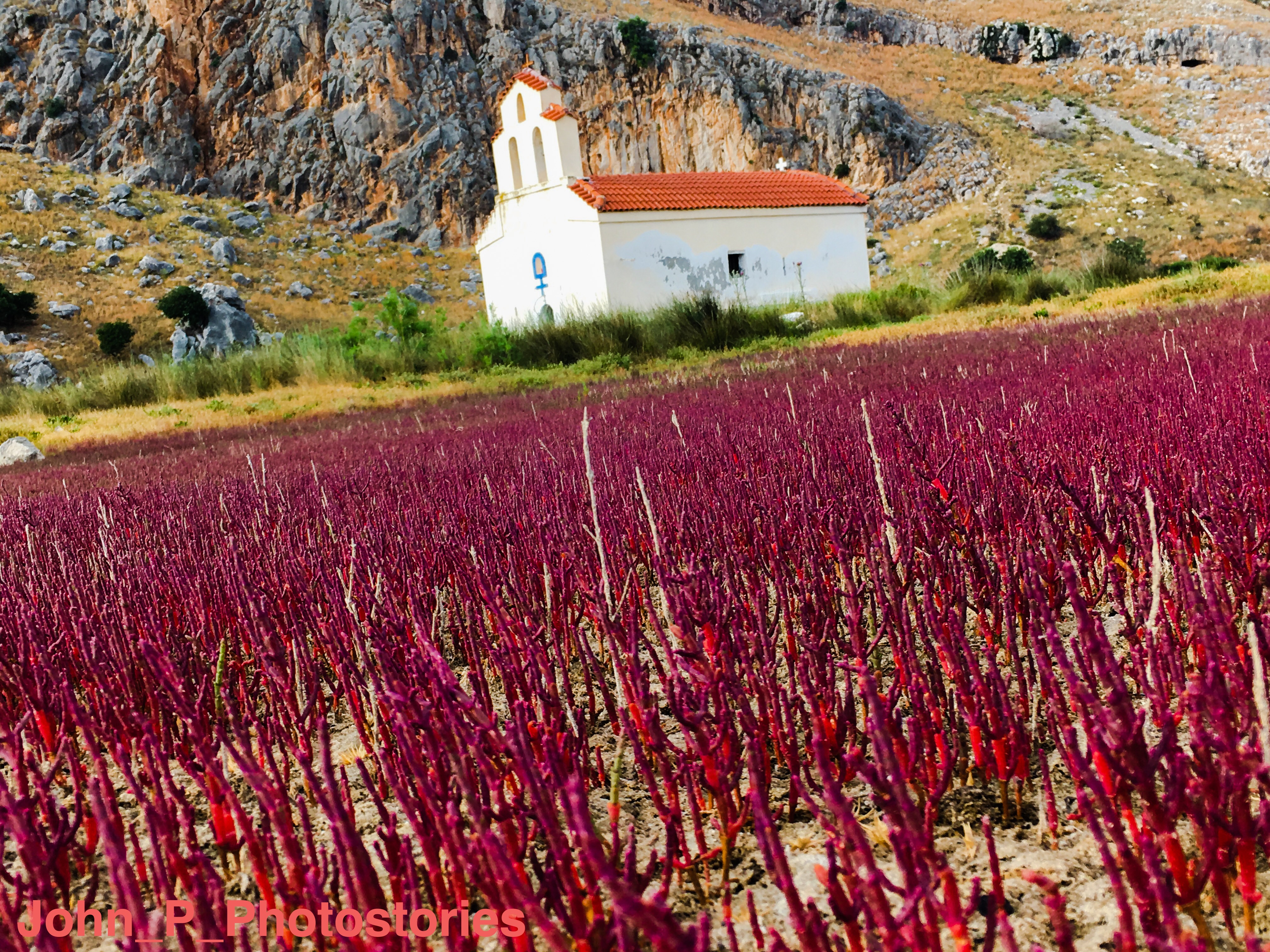
Saint Peter's orthodox chapel surrounded by Halocnemum strobilaceum in Prokopos Lagoon.

== See also ==
- Dymaean Wall
- List of settlements in Achaea
