= Gulf of Corinth basin =

Extensional marine sedimentary basin

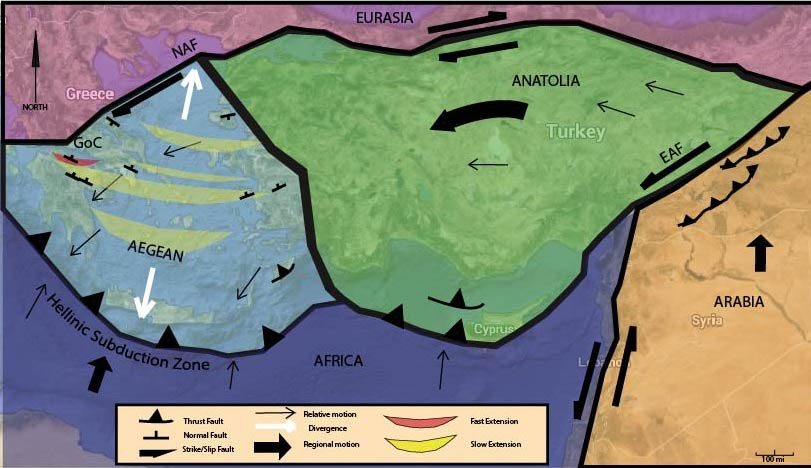
Map of plate motions in the Mediterranean region. The Gulf of Corinth (GoC) is located in the eastern region and is undergoing fast extension. The North Anatolian Fault (NAF) and East Anatolian Fault (EAF) are currently strike-slipping. Adapted from Armijo, 1999

The Gulf of Corinth basin, or Corinth rift, is an active extensional marine sedimentary basin thought to have started deforming during the late Miocene – Pleistocene epoch. The dimensions of the Gulf of Corinth are approximately 105 km long and 30 km wide with a basement depth of 3 km at its center. This half-graben basin is formed by a N100°E-oriented rift which separates the Peloponnese peninsula from the continental mainland of Greece. Currently the Corinth rift is opening at rate of 10–15 mm/yr, with respect to the Eurasia Plate. The basin is bounded by the Peloponnese highlands to the south and the westward-moving Anatolian Fault to the north. Major and minor fault planes make up the north and south margins, and its north-south extension is due to activity along an E-W to NW-SE oriented coastal southern margin. The basin's active and inactive faults create associated syn-rift sediment fill. These aspects provide a unique opportunity for scientists to study the tectonic and stratigraphic development of a rift, while further understanding how a basin is actually made.

It is postulated that crustal extension is related to a combination of factors: westward movement of the North Anatolian Fault, gravitational collapse of the thickened Hellenide orogenic crust, subduction, and slab roll back of the African Plate at the Hellenic trench. As Africa subducts beneath the Aegean Sea Plate the slab essentially pulls the over-riding plate with it, inducing extension. Rifting occurs as the plate stretches weakening the thickened crust causing its collapse upon itself, creating the basin.

== Stratigraphy/sedimentation ==
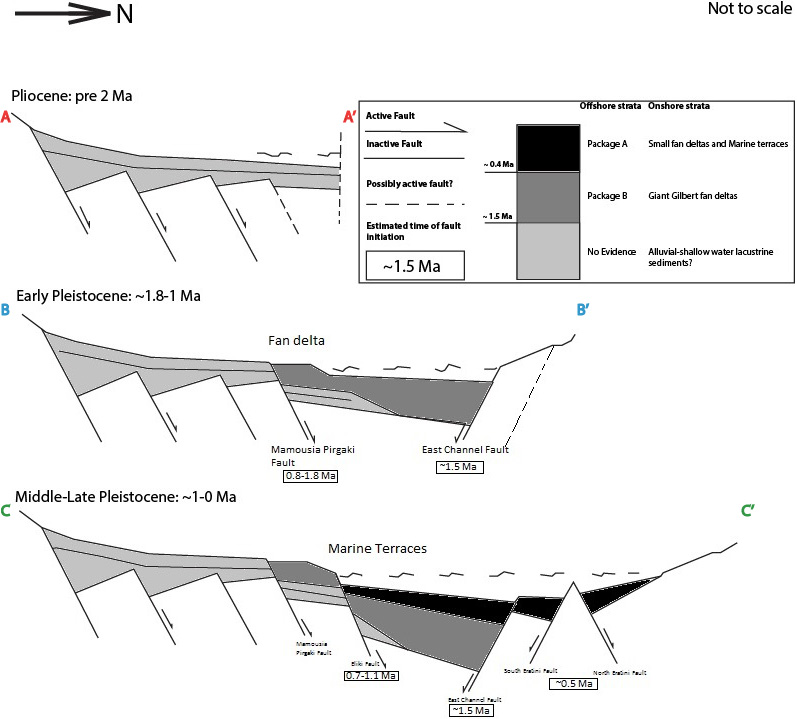
This is a profile view of the evolution of the Gulf of Corinth's basin. The colored letters correspond to the cross section lines drawn on the image above. Adapted from Bell, 2008

Deposition in the Gulf of Corinth occurred in at least two phases, separated by a widespread unconformity. Deposition before 400 ka marks the first phase, likely open to the east, was filled with continental and shallow-water deposits with subsidence rates slightly exceeding sedimentation rates. Average uplift rates during the late Quaternary are estimated between 1–1.5 mm/yr on the southern margin increasing during the Holocene at 1.3–2.2 mm/yr. The high uplift rates expose many marine terraces and other continental to marine deposits. Infilling of the basin began in the Pliocene, depositing continental and shallow-water lacustrine facies followed by marine sediments in the middle Pliocene. This phase can be called proto-Gulf of Corinth as it was a different size and fill than the present day basin and had two different 20–50 km wide depocenters. These depocenters, controlled by north and south dipping faults, crop out near the south margin on the Peloponnese inland. Subsidence is linked to the fault systems bordering the depocenters, which have quickly developed in the basins relatively short 1–2 Ma existence.

Sedimentation can be subdivided into transgressive and regressive trends. The lower transgressive sediments are based with alluvial fanglomerates followed by alluvial plain conglomerate rocks. On top of this is seasonally flooded forest deposits indicated by organic rich mudstones containing leaves of Acer cf. viminalis and Platanus s. Tabular bodied transgressive beach deposits are interbedded with fine-grained sediments and lignite, alluding to fresh-water lacustrine like environment. Animal life fossilized in lacustrine marls consist of few Oligocene ostracods and mollusks – indicative of fresh or shallow brackish water – suggesting the basin had very shallow waters even in its most open condition. Overlying these are regressive beach type deposits, displaying large-scale foresets and a coarsening upward sequence. Passing from open-water the facies change to nearshore and alluvial deposits. A 1000 m basinwide fanglomeratic unit overlies these deposits.

The second sedimentary phase is marked by a dramatic increase in subsidence, unmatched by sedimentation. This phase has a complex history and is composed of deep sea deposits and Gilbert-type deltas sitting unconformably on the fanglomeratic unit. A fault group with a displacement of ~ 600 m created the basis for the deepwater Gilbert-type deposits. These older Evrostini Gilbert-type delta deposits were then uplifted to 800–600 m above sea level, and the younger Ilias Gilbert-type delta formed. This fan delta is approximately 400–300 m above sea level, putting the Evrostini deposits 1200–600 m above sea level. Present day Gilbert-type deltas form on the basin margin as the result of transfer faults perpendicular to the main extension. The present Gulf of Corinth delta deposits crop out along the rim supplying turbidite deposits which are the basins current main fill.

== Active faults ==
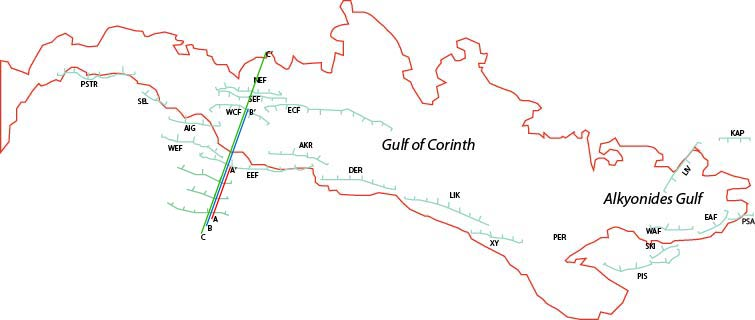
Map of active faults on the northern and southern margins of the Gulf of Corinth. The Cross section lines A, B, and C profiles can be seen in an image below. Adapted from Bell, 2009

=== Western Gulf of Corinth (Aigion to Akrata) ===
The north and south Eratini faults offshore the western gulf are 15 km in length overlapping completely, uplifting a notable basement horst. The south dipping West Channel Fault controls the western draining axial channel which widens eastward as the northern margin becomes controlled by the south dipping East Channel Fault. The East and West Eliki and Aigion faults control the coastline on the southern margin, the Akrata fault may be part of the East Eliki fault. A group of south coast landward inactive faults (Mamoussia – Pirgaki to Kalavrita) are thought to have contributed to extension in an earlier phase of the rifts evolution.

=== Central Gulf of Corinth (Akrata to Xylokastro) ===
The northward dipping 30–40 km Corinth fault lies along the southern margin boundary between Akrata and Xylokastro. This fault, once thought to be just a single fault, is supported as being split into two segments, the western segment is the Derveni Fault and the eastern segment is the Likoporia fault. The northern margin boundary is the eastern extension of the East Channel fault and the south dipping Western Antikyra fault. In adjunct with these active faults there are a few inactive faults, such as the onshore Xylokastro presently located in the footwall of the offshore Likoporia fault.

=== Eastern Gulf of Corinth (Xylokastro to Perachora peninsula) ===
The northern basin margin is defined by minor fault segments such as the southward dipping Eastern Antikyra fault. Several inactive buried faults (N. and S. Corinth) produce localized subsidence. The eastern southern margin is controlled by two 12-km-long northwestward dipping Perachora faults and the northward dipping Xylokastro fault.

=== Alkyonides Gulf ===
Significant faults are the offshore north dipping West and East Alkyonides fault and the onshore north dipping Pisia and skinos faults. Both Pisia and skinos faults mentioned are major structures controlling the topography. The West and East Alkyonides are not connected at the surface and they seem to overlap. These faults control the uplifted Strava graben and uplifted Alkyonides islands. On the northern shore, south dipping faults are much less notable. In 1981 a sequence of earthquakes reactivated the Kaparelli fault which has since then had low and infrequent slip rates.

| Northern Margin Faults | Length (km) | ~ Time of fault initiation (Ma) | Uplift Rate (mm/yr) | Slip Rate (mm/yr) |
|---|---|---|---|---|
| West Channel (WCF) | 15 | 1–2 | n/a | >.45-.9 |
| South Eratini (SEF) | 15 | .5 | n/a | >1.4 |
| North Eratini (NEF) | 15 | .5 | n/a | 2–6.7 |
| East Channel (ECF) | 30 | 1–2 | n/a | >1.2 |
| Livadostros/Germeno (LIV/GER) | n/a | n/a | n/a | .8–1.1 |
| Kaparelli (KAP) | 10 | n/a | n/a | .3 |

| Southern Margin Faults | Length (km) | ~ Time of fault initiation (Ma) | Uplift Rate (mm/yr) | Slip Rate (mm/yr) |
|---|---|---|---|---|
| Psathopyrgos (PSTR) | 15–20 | n/a | .7-.8 | 2–3.5 |
| Selinitika (SEL) | n/a | n/a | n/a | 1.9–2.7 |
| Aigion (AIG) | 12 | .2-.3 | 1-1.2 | 2.4–3.5 |
| West Eliki (WEF) | 15 | .7-1 | 1.25 | 3–5 |
| East Eliki (EEF) | 15 | .7-1 | .9-1.1 | 3–5 |
| Derveni (DER) | 15–18 | 1–2 | 1.3–2.2 | 1.3–2.2 |
| Likoporia (LIK) | 22 | 1–2 | 1.6 | 1.6 |
| Xylocastro (XY) | 12–15 | ~1 | 1.3 | 1.3 |
| Skinos (SKI) | 9 | n/a | n/a | .7–2.5 |
| West Alkyonides (WAF) | n/a | n/a | n/a | n/a |
| East Alkyonides (EAF) | 10 | .8-2.2 | .3 | .3 |
| Psatha (PSA) | 7 | n/a | n/a | .7-.8 |

== Earthquakes ==
Under the north Peloponnese is a 5.5–10 km well defined seismogenic zone that deepens to 12 km under the northern shore of the gulf. This is responsible for major earthquakes like the M_{w} 6.2 15 June 1995 event, and a large number of small to moderate earthquakes. For instance, in the summer of 1993, 232 earthquakes were recorded Due to such active seismicity, many earthquakes activate new fault planes. It is hypothesized that extensional slip on E-W striking, 20°-40° north-dipping planes are caused by earthquakes beneath the northern shore. However, in the Aigion area, fault planes like the Helike Fault have much steeper dips of 55°-70° that can be observed. This difference leaves the connection between outcropping faults and the seismogenic zone open for debate. Other hypotheses include: steeply dipping faults abut at a low-angle seismically active detachment, or they undergo a progressive down-dip curvature and merge into low-angle detachments. The seismic activity of the Corinth rift is monitored by the Corinth Rift Laboratory, an international observatory belonging the European Plate Observing System
