= List of settlements in Achaea =

This is a list of settlements in Achaea, Greece:

- Achaiko
- Agia Marina
- Agia Varvara, Akrata
- Agia Varvara, Tritaia
- Agios Konstantinos
- Agios Nikolaos Kralis
- Agios Nikolaos Spaton
- Agios Nikolaos
- Agios Stefanos (Peristera)
- Agios Stefanos Saravaliou
- Agios Vasileios
- Agiovlasitika
- Agrampela
- Agridi
- Agrilia
- Aigeira
- Aiges
- Aigio
- Akrata
- Aktaio
- Alestaina
- Alissos
- Alepochori
- Alsos
- Ampelokipoi
- Ampelos
- Amygdalea
- Anastasi
- Ano Achaia
- Ano Diakopto
- Ano Katsaiteika
- Ano Kastritsi
- Ano Kleitoria
- Ano Lousoi
- Ano Mazaraki
- Ano Soudenaiika
- Ano Thomeika
- Ano Vlasia
- Ano Zachlorou
- Apideonas
- Arachovitika
- Araxos
- Argyra
- Arla
- Armpounas
- Aroania
- Arravonitsa
- Avgereika
- Chaikali
- Chalandritsa
- Charavgi
- Chatzis
- Chiona
- Chovoli
- Chrysanthio
- Chrysopigi
- Dafnes
- Dafni
- Damakini
- Demesticha
- Desino
- Diakopto
- Didacheika
- Digeliotika
- Dimitropoulo
- Doukanaiika
- Doumena
- Drepano
- Drosato
- Drosia
- Drymos
- Elaiochori
- Elaionas
- Elekistra
- Eliki
- Elliniko
- Erymantheia
- Exochi
- Fares
- Filia
- Flampoura
- Fostaina
- Fragka
- Galanaiika
- Gkaneika
- Gkraika
- Glastra
- Goumenissa
- Grigori
- Isoma
- Kagkadi
- Kalamaki (Charmpileika)
- Kalamias
- Kalanistra
- Kalanos
- Kalavryta
- Kalentzi
- Kalfas
- Kallifoni
- Kallithea
- Kalousi
- Kamares
- Kamenianoi
- Kaminia
- Kandalos
- Kareika
- Kastelli
- Kastria
- Katarraktis
- Katholiko
- Kato Achaia
- Kato Alissos
- Kato Kastritsi
- Kato Katsaiteika
- Kato Lousoi
- Kato Mazaraki
- Kato Thomeika
- Kato Vlasia
- Kato Zachlorou
- Kerpini
- Kertezi
- Keryneia
- Kleitor
- Kleitoria
- Komi
- Korfes
- Kouloura
- Koumari
- Kouneleika
- Kounina
- Kouteli
- Krathio
- Krini Aigaleias
- Krini
- Krinofyta
- Krinos
- Kritharakia
- Kryoneri
- Krystallovrysi
- Lagovouni
- Lakka
- Lakkomata
- Lakkopetra
- Lapanagoi
- Lechouri
- Lefkasio
- Leontio
- Limnochori
- Livartzi
- Longos
- Lousika
- Lykouria
- Mageiras
- Mamousia
- Manesi Patron
- Manesi
- Mataragka
- Mavriki
- Melissia
- Mesorrougi
- Metochi
- Michoi
- Mikros Pontias
- Mintilogli
- Mirali
- Mitopoli
- Moira
- Monastiri
- Monodendri
- Myrovrysi
- Myrtos
- Nasia
- Neo Kompigadi
- Neo Souli
- Neos Erineos
- Nerantzies
- Niforeika
- Nikolaiika
- Oasi
- Ovria
- Pangrati
- Paos
- Paralia Platanou
- Paralia
- Paraskevi
- Patras
- Pefko
- Peristera (Agios Stefanos)
- Peristera Kalavryton
- Perithori
- Petas
- Petrochori
- Petroto
- Petsakoi
- Pititsa
- Plaka
- Planitero
- Platani
- Plataniotissa
- Platanos
- Platanovrysi
- Poimenochori (Boudoureika)
- Porovitsa
- Portes
- Priolithos
- Profitis Ilias
- Psathopyrgos
- Psofida
- Pteri
- Rakita
- Rio
- Riolos
- Rizomylos
- Rodia
- Rododafni
- Rogoi
- Roitika
- Roupakia
- Sageika
- Salmeniko
- Santomeri
- Saravali
- Seires
- Seliana
- Selianitika
- Selinountas
- Sella
- Sigouni
- Sinevro
- Skepasto
- Skiadas
- Skotani
- Skouras
- Souvalioteika
- Souvardo
- Spartia
- Starochori
- Stasi Kerpinis (Rallia)
- Stavrodromi
- Sylivainiotika
- Temeni
- Thea
- Theriano
- Toumpa
- Tourlada
- Trapeza
- Trechlo
- Tsoukalaiika
- Valimi
- Valimitika
- Valta
- Vasiliko
- Vela
- Velimachi
- Velitses
- Verino
- Vilivina
- Voutsimos
- Vrachnaiika
- Vrachni
- Zachloritika
- Zarouchla
- Ziria
- Zisimeika

== See also ==
- List of towns and villages in Greece
