= Elaionas, Achaea =

Elaionas Ελαιώνας
- Community
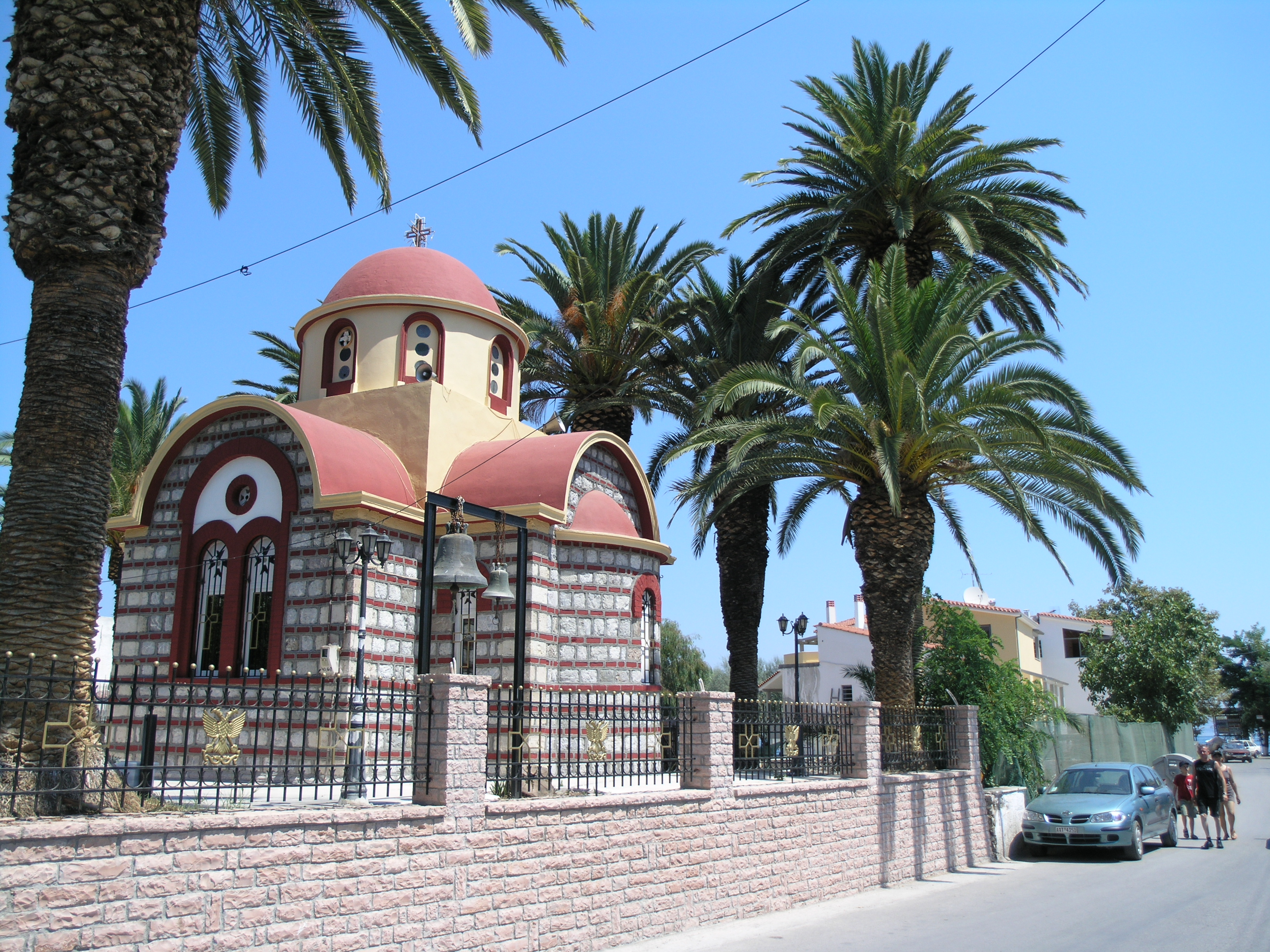

- Location within Greece
- Coordinates: 38°12′N 22°10′E
- Country: Greece
- Administrative region: West Greece
- Regional unit: Achaea
- Municipality: Aigialeia
- Municipal unit: Diakopto

Population (2021)
  - Community: 673
- Time zone: UTC+2 (EET)
  - Summer (DST): UTC+3 (EEST)

Elaeonas or Elaionas (Greek: Ελαιώνας meaning olive grove 'the place where olives grow', before 1949: Τρυπιά - Trypia) is a village and a community in the municipal unit of Diakopto, in the northern part of the Peloponnese peninsula, Greece. It is on the Gulf of Corinth, 3 km west of Diakopto and 9 km southeast of Aigio. Two main roads – the A8 motorway and EO8 road (Athens–Corinth–Patras) – pass south of the village. The community consists of the villages Elaionas, Metochi and Terpsithea.

The village lies between the river of Vouraikos and Selinountas in the foothills of Mount Marathia. According to Pausanias, travelers could visit the caverns of Heracles in those foothills. A small marked path off the EO8 road leads you to these caves.

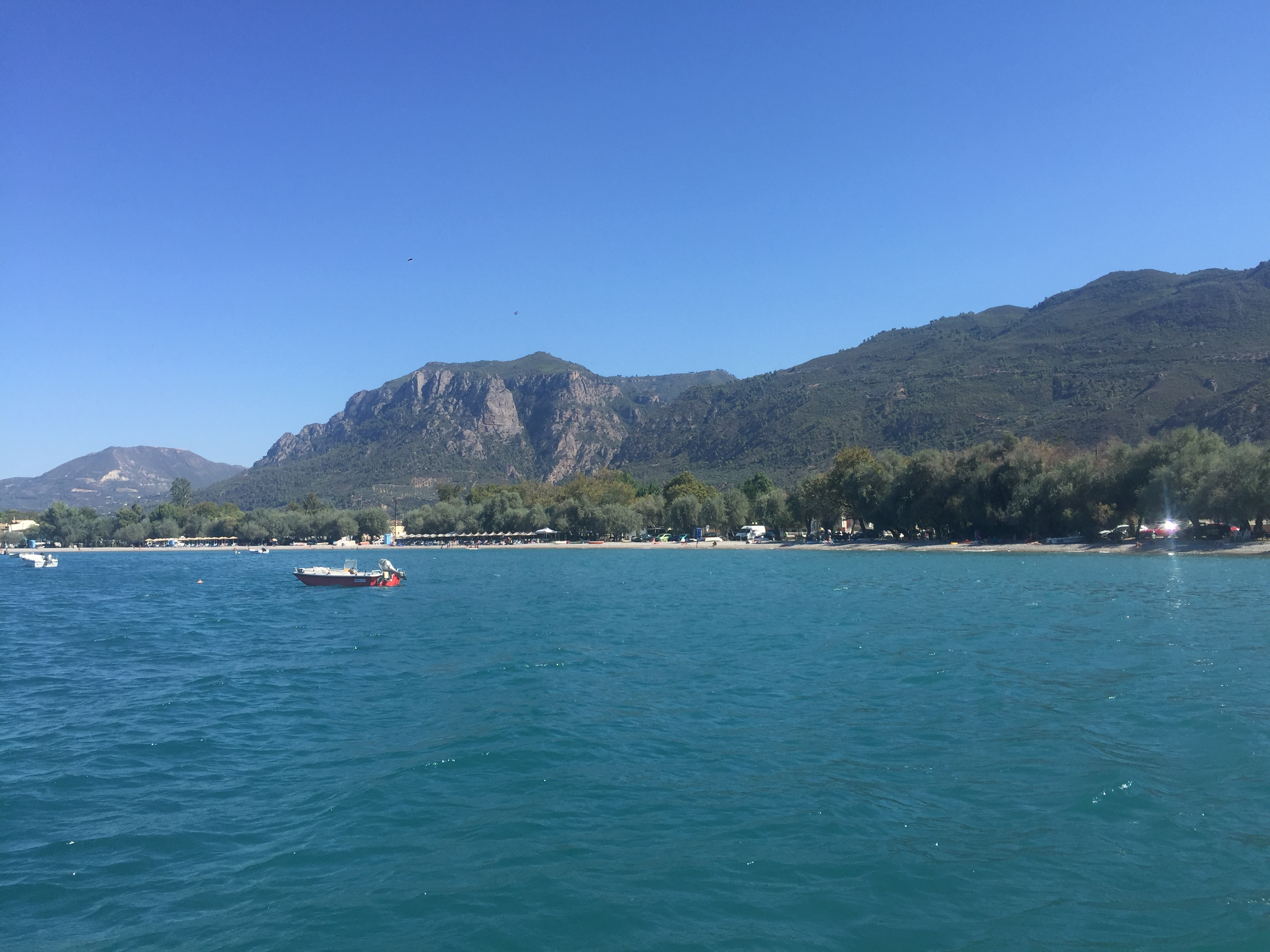

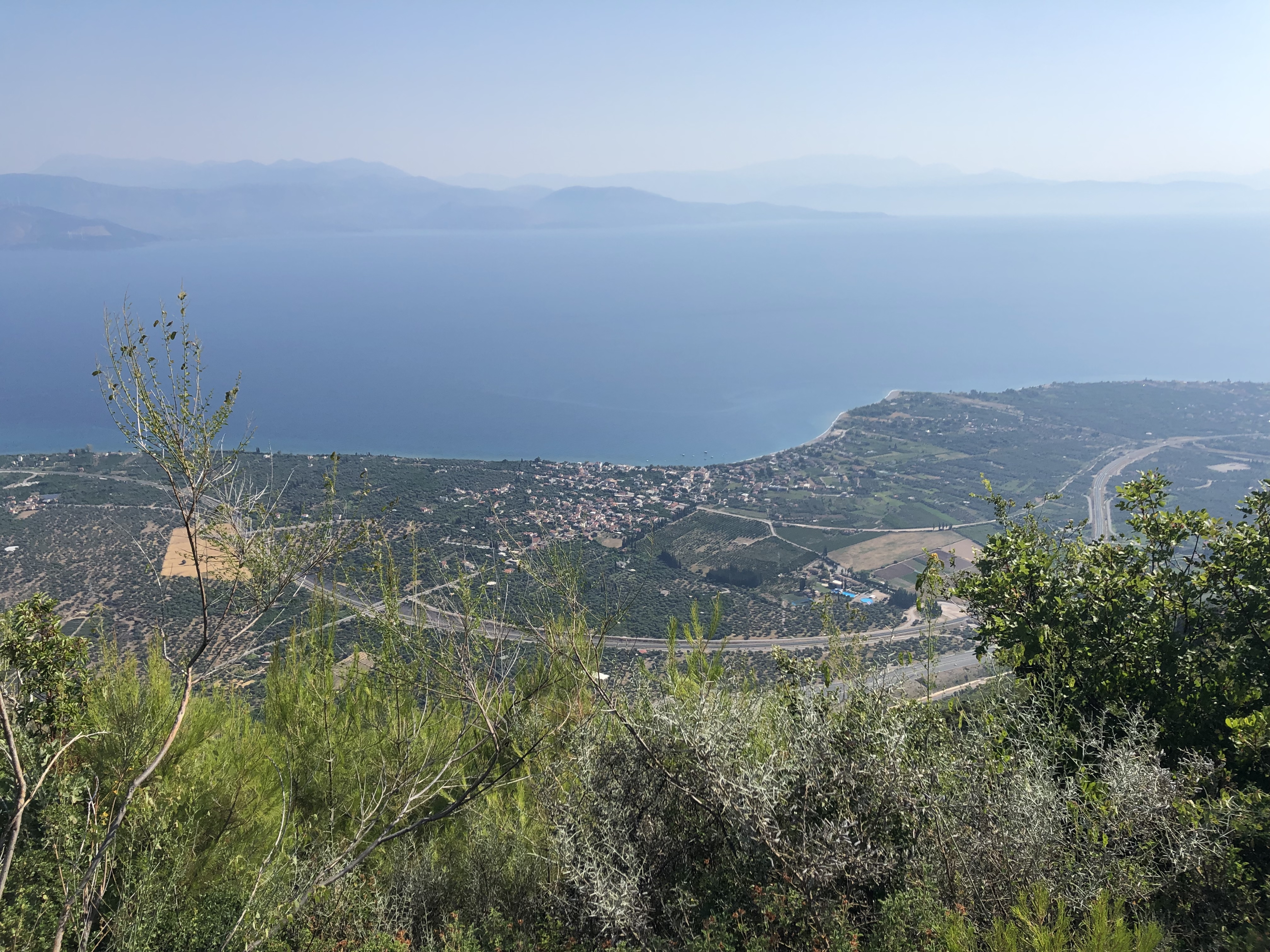

== Population ==
Year	Village population	Community population
1981	655	-
1991	784	856
2001	767	812
2011	671	712
2021	556	673

== See also ==
- List of settlements in Achaea
