= Zachloritika =

Zachloritika Ζαχλωρίτικα
- Community
- Location within Greece
- Coordinates: 38°11′15″N 22°11′0″E
- Country: Greece
- Administrative region: West Greece
- Regional unit: Achaea
- Municipality: Aigialeia
- Municipal unit: Diakopto
- Elevation: 15 m (49 ft)

Population (2021)
  - Community: 330
- Time zone: UTC+2 (EET)
  - Summer (DST): UTC+3 (EEST)
- Postal code: 251 00
- Vehicle registration: AX

Zachloritika (Greek: Ζαχλωρίτικα) is a village and community in the municipal unit of Diakopto, Achaea, Greece. It is located on the left bank of the river Vouraikos, 1 km west of Diakopto. The Greek National Road 8A (Patras - Aigio - Corinth) passes south of the village.

== Population ==
Year	Population
1981	435
1991	568
2001	434
2011	339
2021	330

== See also ==
- List of settlements in Achaea
