= Rodia =

Rodia may refer to:

- Rodia, Achaea, Greece
- Rodia, Grevena, Greece
- Rodia, Larissa, Greece
- Simon Rodia, Italian-American architect who created the Watts Towers in Los Angeles
- Rodia (Star Wars), a fictional minor planet in the Star Wars franchise
