= Eliki =

Eliki Ελίκη
- Community
- Location within Greece
- Coordinates: 38°12.56′N 22°7.25′E
- Country: Greece
- Administrative region: West Greece
- Regional unit: Achaea
- Municipality: Aigialeia
- Municipal unit: Diakopto
- Elevation: 31 m (102 ft)

Population (2021)
  - Community: 497
- Time zone: UTC+2 (EET)
  - Summer (DST): UTC+3 (EEST)
- Postal code: 250 01
- Area code: 26940
- Vehicle registration: AX

Eliki (Greek: Ελίκη, before 1917: Ζευγολατιό - Zevgolatio), is a village and a community in the municipal unit of Diakopto, Achaea, Greece. It was named after the nearby ancient town Helike. Eliki is located near the river Selinountas and the Gulf of Corinth. It is 5 km (3.1 mi) southeast of Aigio and 7 km (4.3 mi) west of Diakopto. Nea Keryneia is adjacent to the east. The community includes the small village Kalanteri. The Greek National Road 8A (Athens - Corinth - Patras) passes south of the village.

== Population ==
Year	Village population	Community population
1981	621	-
1991	531	-
2001	509	565
2011	510	516
2021	487	497

== See also ==
- List of settlements in Achaea
