= Ceryneia =

Town and polis (city-state) of ancient Achaea

Coordinates: 38°09′31″N 22°08′36″E

Ceryneia or Keryneia (Ancient Greek: Κερύνεια, also Cerynia or Kerynia (Κερυνία), Ceraunia or Keraunia (Κεραυνία), Cerauneia or Kerauneia (Κεραύνεια), Caryneia or Karyneia (Καρύνεια), was a town and polis (city-state) of ancient Achaea. It was not originally one of the 12 Achaean cities, though it afterwards became so, succeeding to the place of Aegae. Its population was increased by a large body of Mycenaeans, when the latter abandoned their city to the Argives in 468 BCE. Ceryneia is mentioned as a member of the Achaean League on its revival in c. 280 BCE; and one of its citizens, Marcus, was chosen in 255 BCE as the first sole General of the League. In the time of Strabo, Ceryneia was dependent upon Aegium. It was situated inland upon a lofty height, west of the river Cerynites (Bokhusia), and a little south of Helice. Theophrastus stated that the wine of Ceryneia produced abortion.

The place is celebrated in Greek mythology as the location of the Ceryneian Hind, the capture of which was one of the Labours of Hercules.

Its ruins have been discovered on the height, which rises above the right bank of the Cerynites, just where it issues from the mountains into the plain, near modern Mamousia. The modern town of Keryneia takes its name from the ancient town.

Map of ancient Achaea (with place names in Greek)

== People ==
- Margos, (c. 300-229 BC) strategos and navarch of the Achaean League
