= Nikolaiika =

Nikolaiika Νικολαίϊκα
- Community
- Location within Greece
- Coordinates: 38°12′N 22°08′E
- Country: Greece
- Administrative region: West Greece
- Regional unit: Achaea
- Municipality: Aigialeia
- Municipal unit: Diakopto

Population (2021)
  - Community: 368
- Time zone: UTC+2 (EET)
  - Summer (DST): UTC+3 (EEST)

Nikolaiika (Greek: Νικολαίϊκα) is a village in the municipal unit of Diakopto, Achaea, Greece. It is located near the Gulf of Corinth coast, 1 km east of Rizomylos, 5 km west of Diakopto and 7 km southeast of Aigio. The Greek National Road 8A (Patras - Aigio - Corinth) passes south of the village.

== Population ==
Year	Population
1981	453
1991	458
2001	429
2011	438
2021	368

== Geometric temple ==
An archaeological site has been located and is being excavated, which includes a temple from the Geometric period and the remains of a sanctuary from the Archaic period. The Geometric period temple (8th century BC) has been excavated in its eastern half, where the entrance, including an apsidal porch, is located; the western half is still unexcavated. Small-sized votive offerings of chariot wheels have been found, suggesting that this was a temple dedicated to Poseidon, the god who, according to the belief of the time, caused earthquakes by riding in his chariot. The excavation is being led by Greek archaeologists Erofili Kolia and Anastasia Gadolu.

== See also ==
- List of settlements in Achaea
