= Rizomylos =

Rizomylos (Greek: Ριζόμυλος meaning rice mill) may refer to several places in Greece:

- Rizomylos, Achaea, a village in the municipal unit of Diakopto, Achaea
- Rizomylos, Magnesia a village in the municipal unit of Karla, Magnesia
