= Ceraunia =

Ceraunia or Keraunia (Ancient Greek: Κεραυνία) may refer to:

- Caucasian Mountains, in their Ancient Greek name
- Ceraunia or thunderstones, prehistoric stone tools
- Ceraunian Mountains, mountains of Albania
- Ceryneia, a city of ancient Achaea, Greece
