= Trapeza, Achaea =

Trapeza Τράπεζα
- Community
- Location within Greece
- Coordinates: 38°10′N 22°14′E
- Country: Greece
- Administrative region: West Greece
- Regional unit: Achaea
- Municipality: Aigialeia
- Municipal unit: Diakopto

Population (2021)
  - Community: 260
- Time zone: UTC+2 (EET)
  - Summer (DST): UTC+3 (EEST)

Trapeza (Greek: Τράπεζα) is a village and a community in the municipal unit of Diakopto, Achaea, Greece. It is located 4 km southeast of Diakopto and 8 km west of Akrata. The community includes the village Paralia Trapezis. Between 1892 and 1940, its name was Nea Voura (Νέα Βούρα).

Trapeza is located on a cliff, about 130 m above the Gulf of Corinth. The Greek National Road 8A (Patras - Corinth) and the railway Patras - Corinth run along the shore below the village. Trapeza has a well known beach called Pounta. The ancient city of Boura may have been located near present Trapeza.

== Climate ==
Trapeza has a hot-summer Mediterranean climate (Köppen climate classification: Csa). Trapeza experiences hot, dry summers and mild, wet winters.

== Population ==
Year	Population
1981	271
1991	252
2001	310
2011	314
2021	260

== See also ==
- List of settlements in Achaea
