= Diakopto =

Diakopto Διακοπτό
- Municipal unit
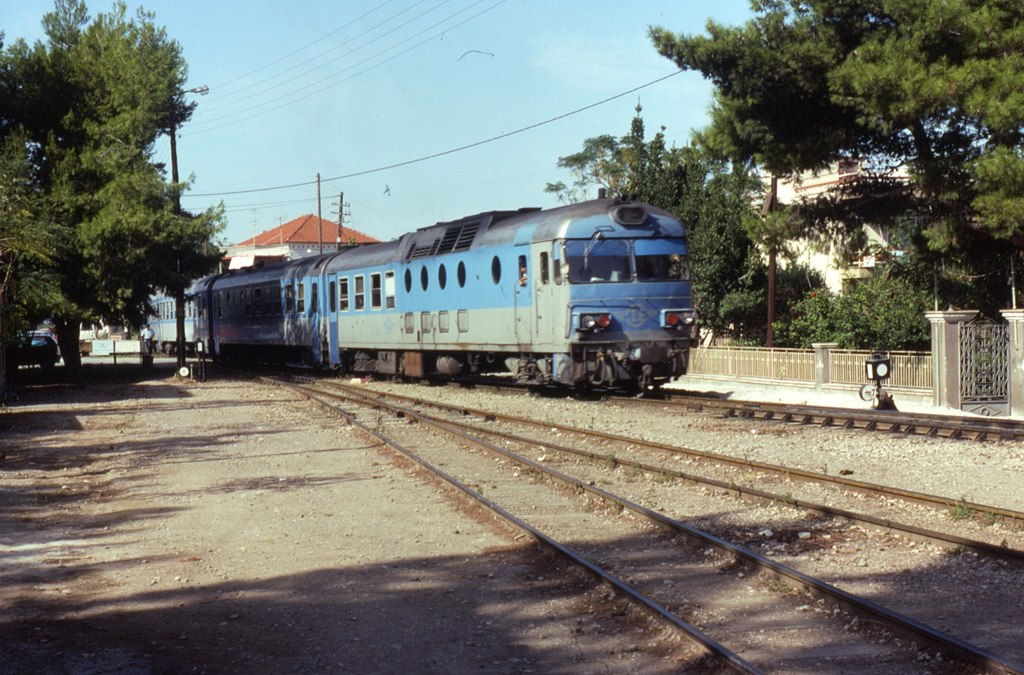
- Diakopto station in 1992 (metric gauge line no longer in use).

- Location within the regional unit

- Location within Greece
- Coordinates: 38°11′N 22°11′E
- Country: Greece
- Administrative region: West Greece
- Regional unit: Achaea
- Municipality: Aigialeia
- Districts: 12

Area
  - Municipal unit: 103.93 km^{2} (40.13 sq mi)
- Elevation: 52 m (171 ft)

Population (2021)
  - Municipal unit: 5,603
  - Municipal unit density: 53.91/km^{2} (139.6/sq mi)
  - Community: 1,977
- Time zone: UTC+2 (EET)
  - Summer (DST): UTC+3 (EEST)
- Postal code: 250 03
- Area code: 24230
- Website: www.diakopto.gov.gr

Diakopto (Greek: Διακοπτό) is a coastal town in Achaea, West Greece, Greece. Since the 2011 local government reforms it is a municipal unit of the Aigialeia municipality. The municipal unit has an area of 103.932 km^{2}. The town of Diakopto is situated on the Gulf of Corinth, near the mouth of the Vouraikos river and at the lower end of the Vouraikos Gorge. The 750 mm (2 ft 5 1/2 in) gauge Diakofto–Kalavryta Railway built in 1885 leads up to the town of Kalavryta passing the Mega Spilaio Monastery at about halfway. Diakopto is on the old Greek National Road 8 (Athens - Corinth - Patras); the new Greek National Road 8A (also Athens - Corinth - Patras) passes 1 km to the south. Diakopto is located about 40 km east of Patras, and 15 km southeast of Aigio.

== Subdivisions ==
The municipal unit Diakopto is subdivided into the following communities (constituent villages in brackets):

- Ano Diakopto (Ano Diakopto, Pounta)
- Diakopto (Diakopto, Kalyvitis, Kernitsa, Lofos)
- Eliki (Eliki, Kalanteri)
- Katholiko
- Keryneia (Keryneia, Nea Keryneia)
- Mamousia (Mamousia, Derveni, Stavria)
- Nikoleika
- Rizomylos
- Rodia
- Trapeza (Trapeza, Paralia Trapezis)
- Tripia (Tripia, Metochi, Terpsithea)
- Zachloritika

== Population ==
| Year | Municipal unit population | Community population |
|---|---|---|
| 1981 | - | 1,848 |
| 1991 | 7,023 | 2,109 |
| 2001 | 7,005 | 2,290 |
| 2011 | 6,429 | 2,183 |
| 2021 | 5,603 | 1,977 |

== History ==
In the area there were three ancient Greek cities: Boura, Helike and Keryneia. The area followed the fate of the rest of Achaea. Between 1460 and 1821 the area was ruled by the Ottoman Empire, except a brief period of Venetian rule between 1687 and 1715. As a result of the Greek War of Independence of 1821 Diakopto became part of the new Greek state. The municipality was created in 1835. The municipality was known as Voura (Βουρά).

== Persons ==
- Dionysis Papagiannopoulos (1912–1984) actor

== Sporting clubs ==
- Lykoi Diakoptou
- Floga Rodias
- Iraklis Zachloritikon
- Niki Nikoleikon
- Athlitikos Omilos Diakoptou (AOD)

== See also ==
- List of settlements in Achaea
