= Chatzis, Achaea =

Chatzis Χατζής
- Community
- Location within Greece
- Coordinates: 38°14′N 22°02′E
- Country: Greece
- Administrative region: West Greece
- Regional unit: Achaea
- Municipality: Aigialeia
- Municipal unit: Aigio

Population (2021)
  - Community: 41
- Time zone: UTC+2 (EET)
  - Summer (DST): UTC+3 (EEST)

Chatzis (Greek: Χατζής) is a village in the municipal unit of Aigio, Achaea, Greece. It is located 6 km southwest of Aigio town.Chatzis suffered damage from the 2007 Greek forest fires.

== Population ==
Year	Population
1981	74
1991	50
2001	63
2011	51
2021	41

== See also ==
- List of settlements in Achaea
