= Ano Diakopto =

Ano Diakopto Άνω Διακοπτό
- Community
- Location within Greece
- Coordinates: 38°08′N 22°14′E
- Country: Greece
- Administrative region: West Greece
- Regional unit: Achaea
- Municipality: Aigialeia
- Municipal unit: Diakopto

Population (2021)
  - Community: 147
- Time zone: UTC+2 (EET)
  - Summer (DST): UTC+3 (EEST)

Ano Diakopto (Greek: Άνω Διακοπτό, before 1940: Πέρα Μαχαλάς - Pera Machalas) is a village and a community in the municipal unit of Diakopto, Achaea, Greece. It is 6 km southeast of Diakopto. The community includes the village of Pounta. Ano Diakopto suffered damage from the 2007 Greek forest fires.

== Population ==
Year	Population	Community population
1981	280	-
1991	329	-
2001	344	373
2011	304	317
2021	134	147

== See also ==
- List of settlements in Achaea
