= Monodendri, Achaea =

Monodendri Μονοδένδρι
- Community
- Location within Greece
- Coordinates: 38°10′17″N 21°40′30″E
- Country: Greece
- Administrative region: Western Greece
- Regional unit: Achaea
- Municipality: Patras
- Municipal unit: Vrachneika
- Elevation: 5 m (16 ft)

Population (2021)
  - Community: 572
- Time zone: UTC+2 (EET)
  - Summer (DST): UTC+3 (EEST)
- Postal code: 250 02
- Area code: 2610

Monodendri (Greek: Μονοδένδρι) is a suburban village located 10 km south of Patras, Greece. It is part of the municipal unit of Vrachnaiika. It is situated on the Gulf of Patras coast, adjacent to Roitika to the north, and Vrachnaiika to the southwest. The community has a disused train station on the line form Patras to Pyrgos. The Greek National Road 9 (Patras - Pyrgos) passes east of the village.

== Historical population ==
Year	Population
1981	361
1991	522
2001	604
2011	721
2021	572

== See also ==
- List of settlements in Achaea
