= Mamousia =

Mamousia Μαμουσιά
- Community
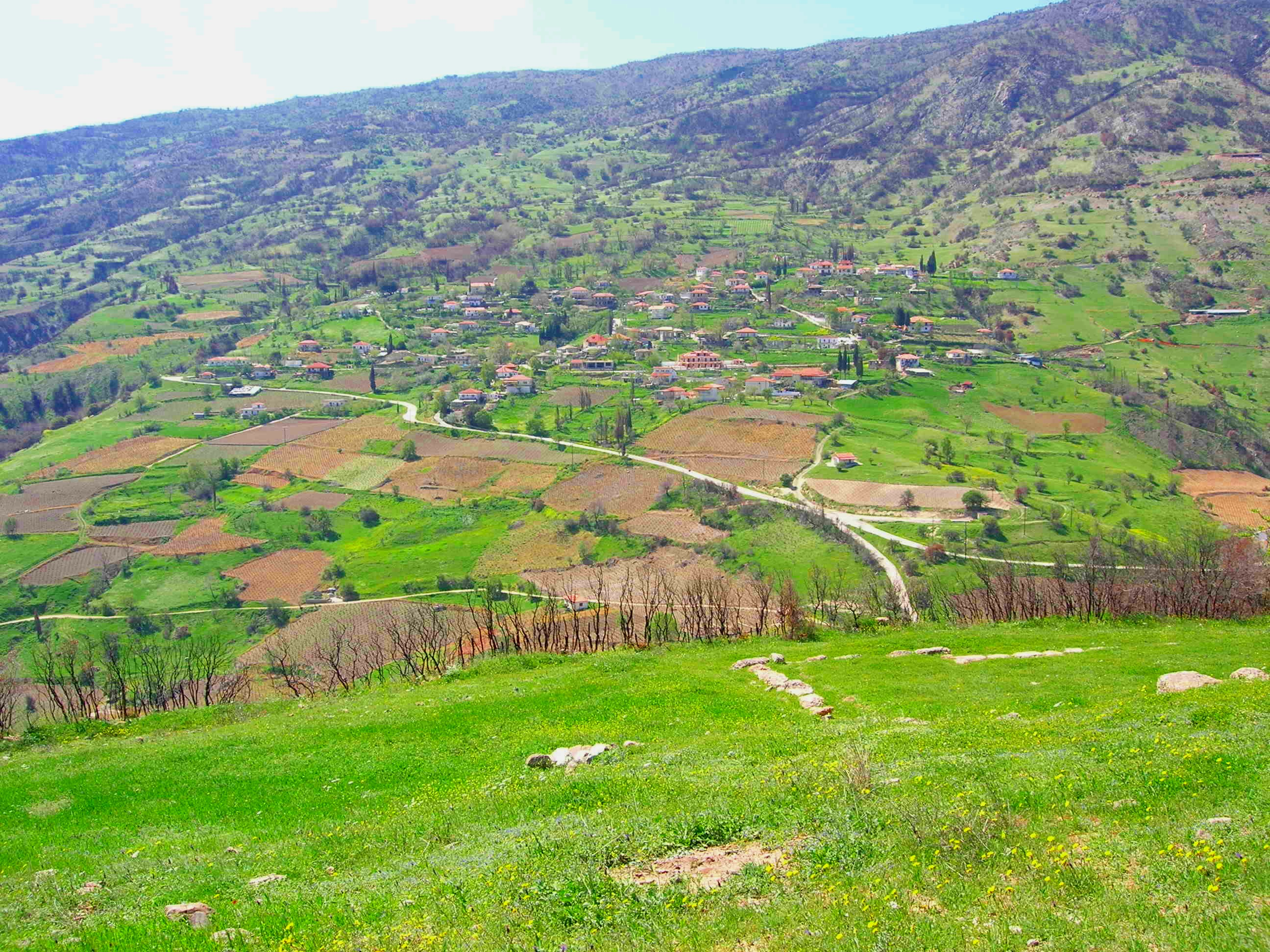
- Mamousia, 2008

- Location within Greece
- Coordinates: 38°09′N 22°08′E
- Country: Greece
- Administrative region: West Greece
- Regional unit: Achaea
- Municipality: Aigialeia
- Municipal unit: Diakopto

Population (2021)
  - Community: 195
- Time zone: UTC+2 (EET)
  - Summer (DST): UTC+3 (EEST)

Mamousia (Greek: Μαμουσιά) is a village and a community in the municipal unit of Diakopto, Achaea, Greece. It is 6 km southwest of Diakopto, on the west side of the Vouraikos gorge. The community includes the villages Derveni and Stavria.

== Population ==
Year	Village population	Community population
1981	-	382
1991	232	352
2001	177	295
2011	214	355
2021	127	195

== History ==
The ancient city Boura was located near present Mamousia. The city had an ancient theatre most of which has yet to be excavated; several artifacts are on display at the Aigio Archeological Museum. Boura was destroyed in an earthquake in 373 BC. Mamousia suffered damage from the 2007 Greek forest fires.

== See also ==
- List of settlements in Achaea
