= Elekistra =

Elekistra Ελεκίστρα
- Community
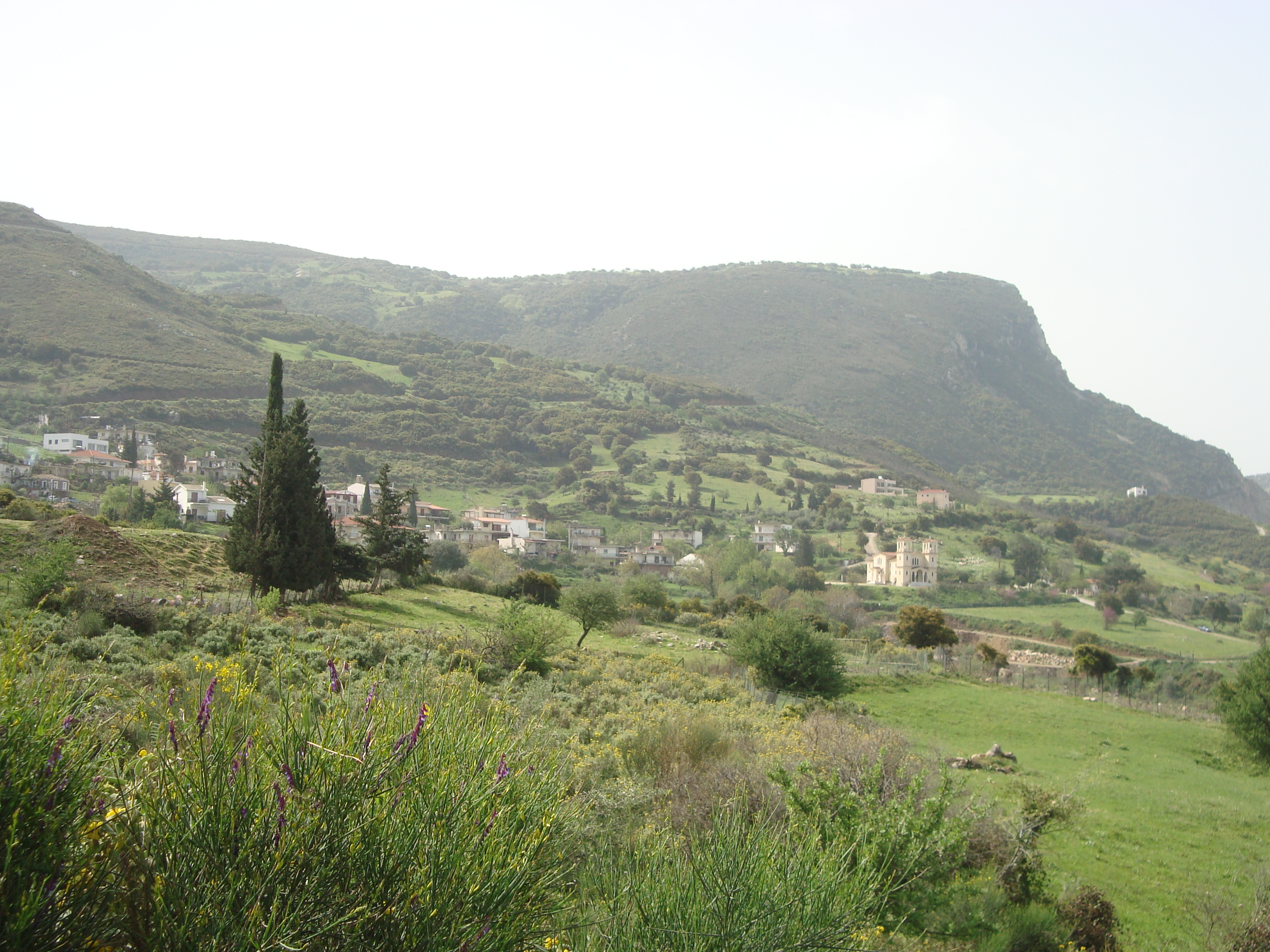

- Location within Greece
- Coordinates: 38°13′N 21°48′E
- Country: Greece
- Administrative region: West Greece
- Regional unit: Achaea
- Municipality: Patras
- Municipal unit: Patras

Population (2021)
  - Community: 1,710
- Time zone: UTC+2 (EET)
  - Summer (DST): UTC+3 (EEST)

Elekistra (Greek: Ελεκίστρα also Ελικίστρα) is a village and a community in the municipality of Patras, Achaea, Greece. It is situated in the foothills of the Panachaiko mountain, southeast of the built-up area of Patras, about 7 km from the city centre. The community consists of the Elekistra, Karya, Pournarokastro, Ryaki and Romanos.

== Population ==
Year	Population village	Population community
1981	-	1,186
1991	209	-
2001	260	1,378
2011	275	1,538
2021	276	1,710

== See also ==
- List of settlements in Achaea
