= Kaminia, Achaea =

Kaminia Καμίνια
- Community
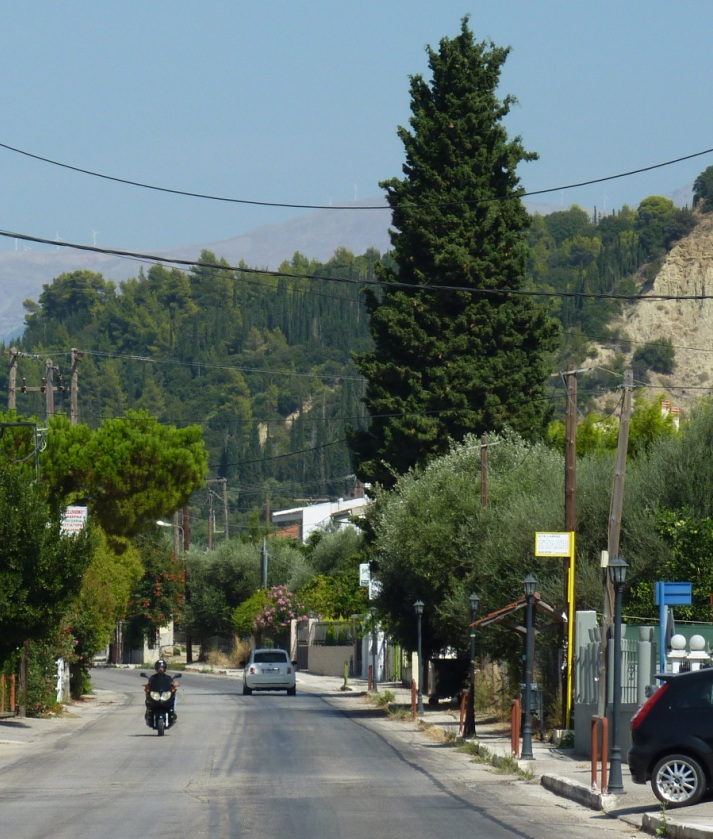
- The Old Patra-Pyrgos National Road passing through Kaminia

- Location within Greece
- Coordinates: 38°8′50″N 21°37′20″E
- Country: Greece
- Administrative region: West Greece
- Regional unit: Achaea
- Municipality: Patras
- Municipal unit: Vrachnaiika
- Elevation: 10 m (33 ft)

Population (2021)
  - Community: 703
- Time zone: UTC+2 (EET)
  - Summer (DST): UTC+3 (EEST)
- Postal code: 270 52
- Area code: 26240
- Vehicle registration: AX

Kaminia (Greek: Καμίνια) is a village in Achaea, Greece. It is part of the municipal unit of Vrachnaiika. Kaminia is situated on the Ionian Sea coast, 15 km southwest of Patras, and 6 km east of Kato Achaia. Since the 1980s, the village is bypassed by Greek National Road 9 (Patras - Pyrgos - Kyparissia). Kaminia had a small train station on the currently unexploited Patras–Pyrgos railway.

== Population ==
Year	Population
1981	546
1991	635
2001	785
2011	716
2021	703

== See also ==
- List of settlements in Achaea
