= Vrachnaiika =

Vrachnaiika Βραχναίικα
- Municipal unit
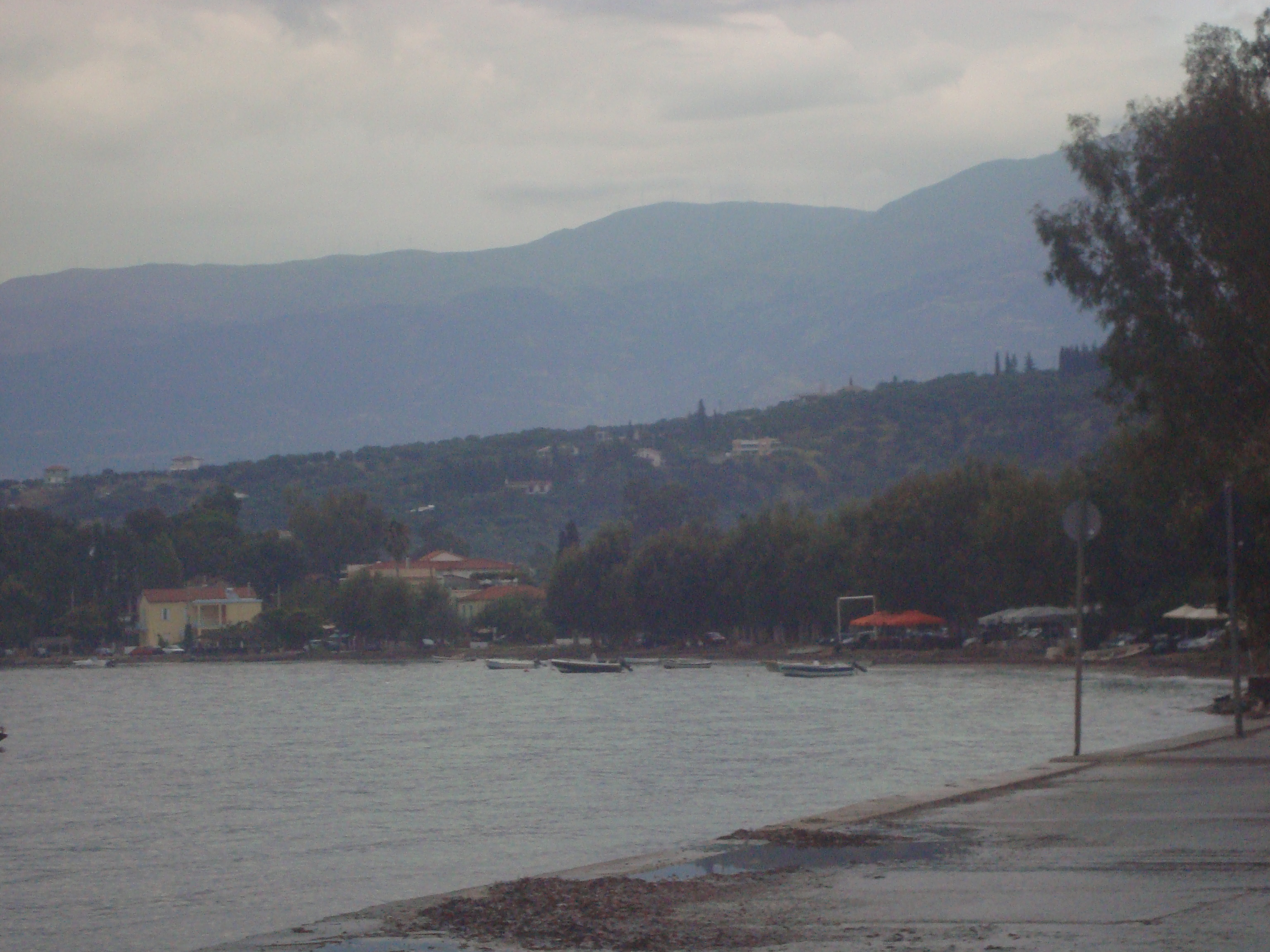
- Vrachneika seaside street and beach

- Location within the regional unit

- Location within Greece
- Coordinates: 38°9.7′N 21°40′E
- Country: Greece
- Administrative region: Western Greece
- Regional unit: Achaea
- Municipality: Patras

Area
  - Municipal unit: 32.11 km^{2} (12.40 sq mi)
- Elevation: 25 m (82 ft)

Population (2021)
  - Municipal unit: 4,834
  - Municipal unit density: 150.5/km^{2} (389.9/sq mi)
  - Community: 2,908
- Time zone: UTC+2 (EET)
  - Summer (DST): UTC+3 (EEST)
- Postal code: 250 02
- Area code: 2610
- Vehicle registration: ΑΧ

Vrachnaiika (Greek: Βραχνέικα or Βραχναίικα, Greek pronunciation: [vraxˈneika]) is a town and a former municipality in the regional unit of Achaea, Greece. Since the 2011 local government reform it is part of the municipality Patras, of which it is a municipal unit. The municipal unit has an area of 32.111 km^{2}. It is a suburb of Patras, about 11 km southwest of the city centre, on the Gulf of Patras coast. The community has a disused rail station on the line from Patras to Pyrgos. The EO9 road (from Patras to Methoni, via Pyrgos) passes south of the centre.

== Name ==
The name Vrachnaiika originates from the mountainous village of Vrachni in Kalavryta, from where the area's first inhabitants hailed. The suffix "-eika" (or "-aika") is common in Achaea and translates to "huts or houses". Accordingly, Vrachnaiika translates to "Vrachnaean huts/houses"—meaning the huts or houses of the people of Vrachni. The small town is also known by the name "Agios Vasileios", though this name is not used very frequently; the toponym dates back to the period when the then-uninhabited area belonged to the village of Dresthena. Agios Vasileios is also the name of the settlement's central church.

== Population history ==
Year	Municipal district	Municipality
1981	2,167	-
1991	2,259	4,274
2001	2,828	5,049
2011	2,664	4,627
2021	2,908	4,834

== Subdivisions ==
The municipal unit Vrachnaiika is subdivided into the following communities (constituent villages in brackets):

- Kaminia
- Monodendri
- Theriano
- Tsoukalaiika
- Vrachnaiika (Vrachnaiika, Dresthena, Moiraiika)

== See also ==
- List of settlements in Achaea
