= Margos =

Ancient Greek strategos of the Achaean League

Margos or Margus (Ancient Greek: Μάργος) of Keryneia (died 229 BC) was the first unique strategos (elected general) of the Achaean League in Ancient Greece. He served during a long period, although only one term is certain in the year 256–255 BC.

Margos started his career around 275 BC by killing the tyrant of Bura and forcing the tyrant Iseas of Keryneia to resign. After joining the Achaean League, he became the leading statesman of the Achaeans and in 256 BC put through a reform to reduce the number of generals from two to one. Margos was then the first leader elected to the post. As elder statesman he later served as navarch (admiral) of the Achaean fleet and fell in the Battle of Paxos against the Illyrians in 229 BC.

== Notes ==
New title	Strategos of the Achaean League; 256–255 BC	Succeeded by Aratus of Sicyon
