= Rakita, Greece =

Village in Greece

Coordinates: 38°8′35″N 21°57′5″E

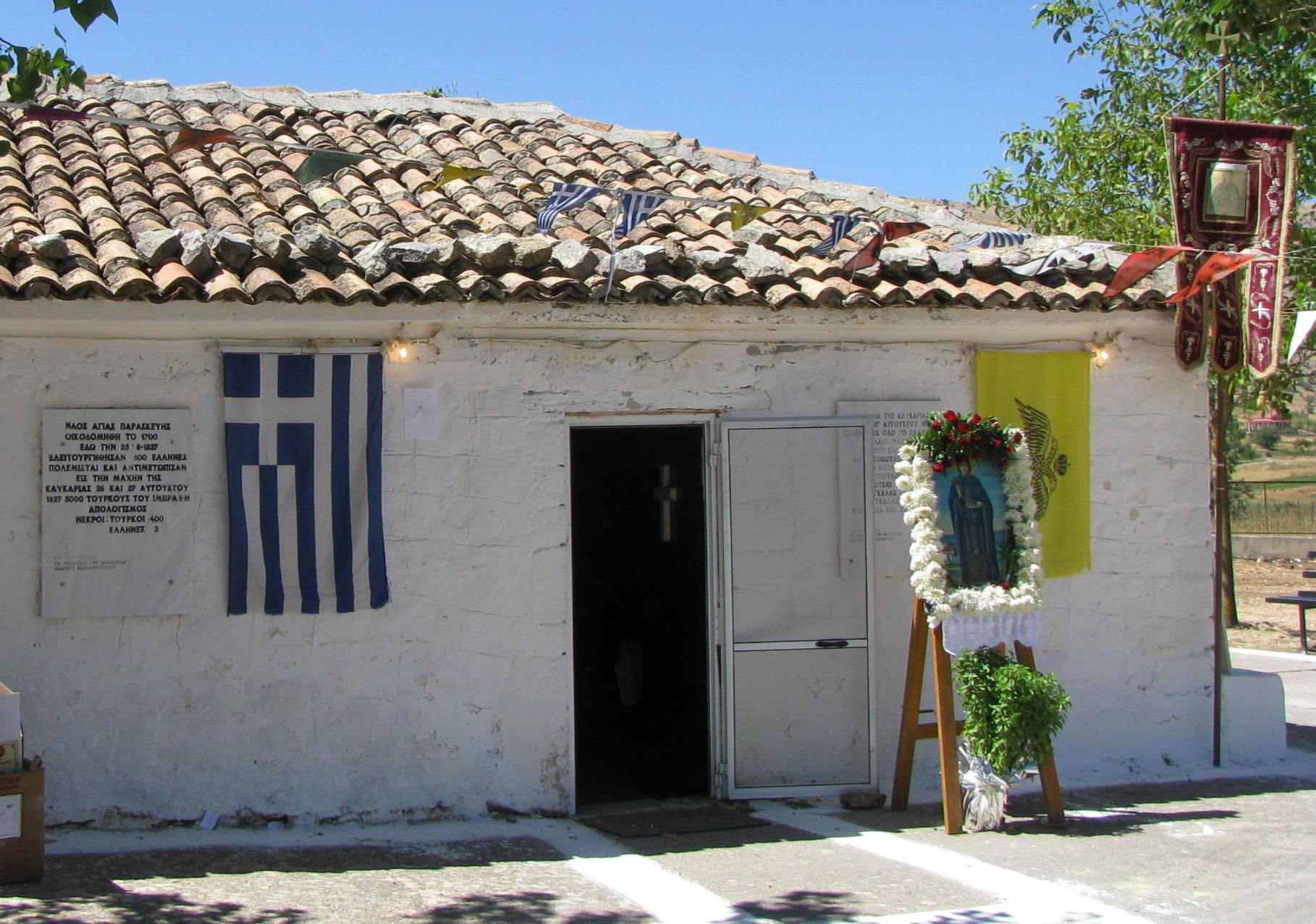
The historic old church of Agia Paraskevi

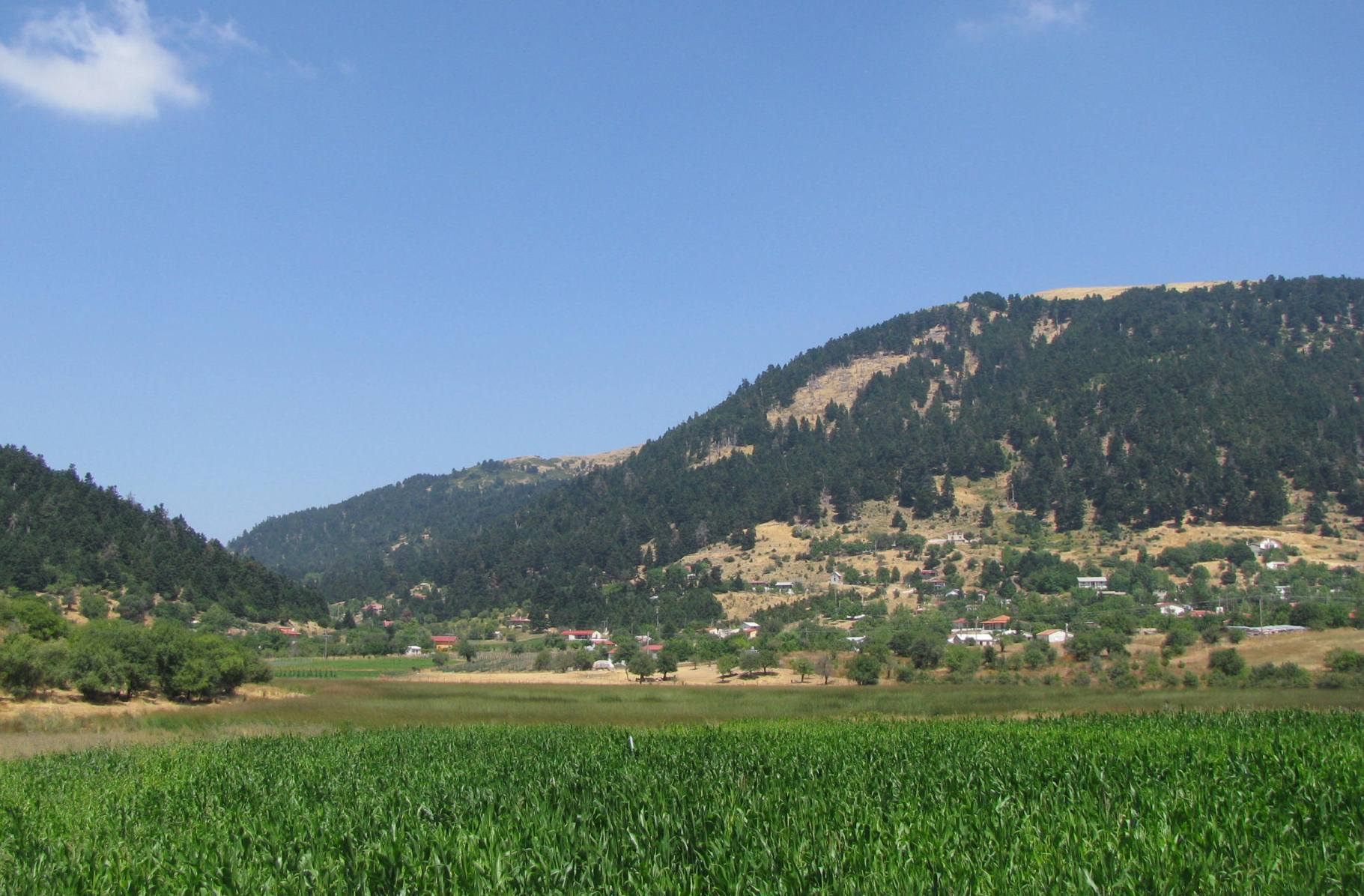
Plateau of Rakita

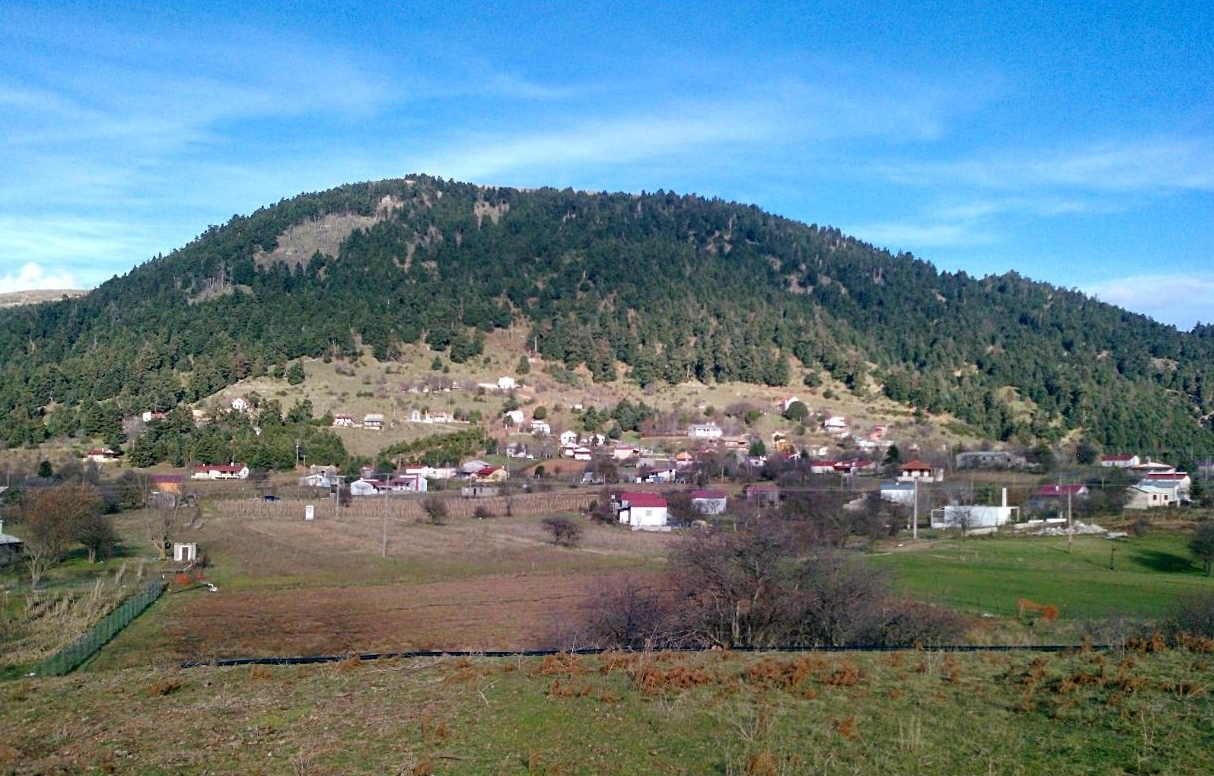
Plateau of Rakita

Rakita (Greek: Ρακίτα) is a location in the municipal unit Leontio, Achaea, Greece. It is part of the community of Ano Mazaraki. Located at an altitude of about 1,100 m in a plateau near mount Barbas, it is surrounded by fir forests and mountain views. In recent years it has seen an increase in the number of tourists visiting, partly due to improved road access.

During recent excavations in the region of Rakita an ancient temple, sacred to the Goddess Artemis, was discovered. Also in the settlement lies the historic old church of Agia Paraskevi (built in 1700) where the Greek rebels under Theodoros Kolokotronis attended the divine liturgy just before the crucial victorious battle in Kafkaria against the Turkish general Ibrahim Pasha of Egypt. (26 August 1827).

== Sources ==
- Petropoulos M., «The Geometric Temple at Ano Mazaraki (Rakita) in Achaia during the Period of Colonisation», in Em. Greco (επιμ.), Gli Achei e l’ identità etnica degli Achei d’ Occidente, Atti del Convegno Internationale di Studi (Paestum, 23-25.2.2001), Paestum-Athens 2002, p. 143-164.
- Ιωάννης Δ. Παπαδημητρίου, Το Μαζαράκι των Πειρών και της Παναχαΐας και το Μαζαράκι των Πατρών και της Ωλενίας. Από 1600 π.Χ. μέχρι σήμερον, Πάτρα 2000 (2η έκδοση) (in Greek)
