= Ceryneian Hind =

Animal from Greek mythology

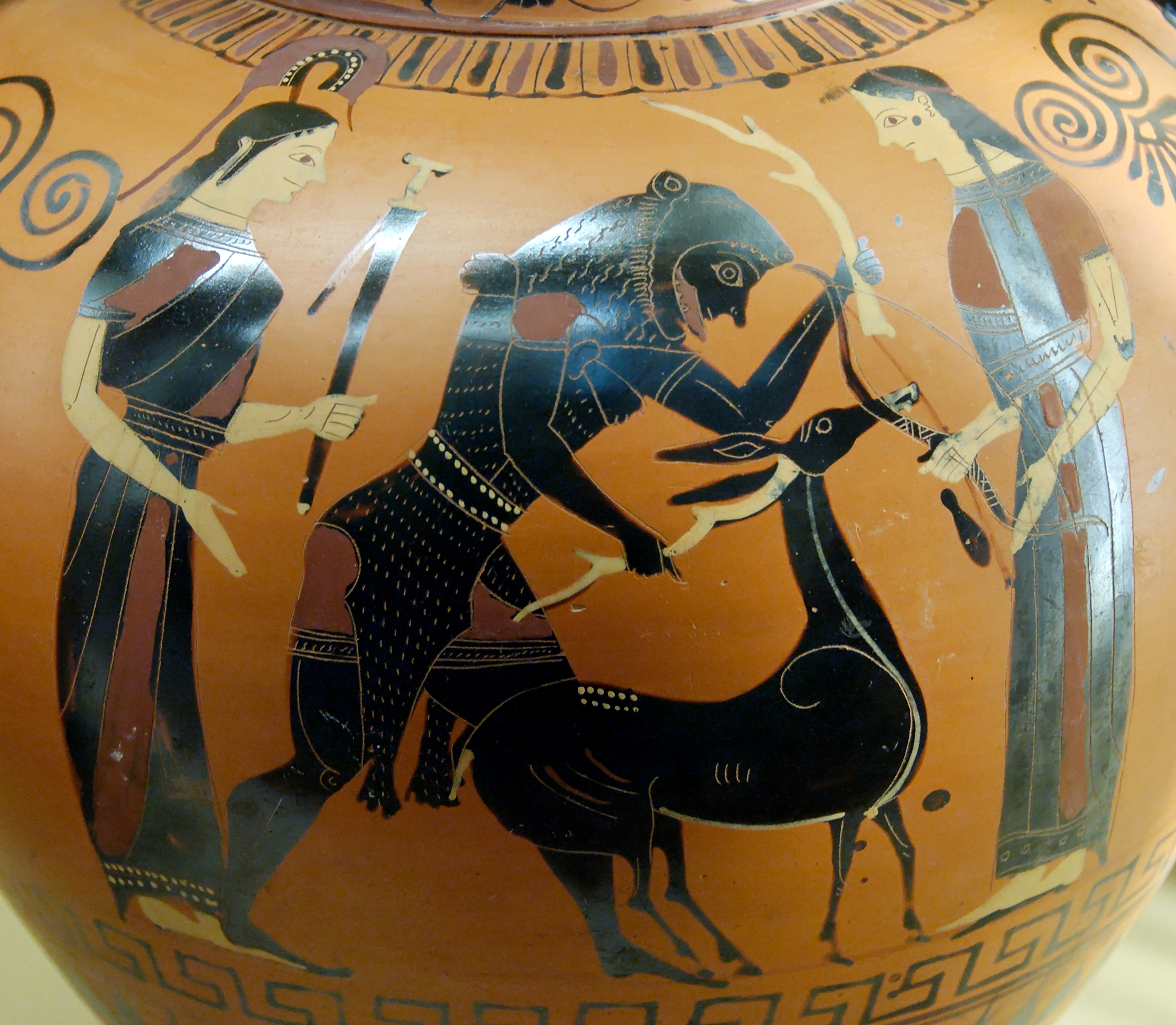
Heracles breaking off the golden antler of the Ceryneian Hind, while Athena (left) and Artemis look on (black-figure amphora, ca. 540–30 BC)

In Greek mythology, the Ceryneian hind (Ancient Greek: Κερυνῖτις ἔλαφος Kerynitis elaphos, Latin: Elaphus Cerynitis), was the enormous hind of Ceryneia, larger than a bull, with golden antlers like a stag, hooves of bronze or brass, and a "dappled hide", that "excelled in swiftness of foot", and snorted fire. To bring her back alive to Eurystheus in Mycenae was the third labour of Heracles.

Other names and descriptions for her were: doe with the golden horns, golden-horned hind, Ceryneia hind, Cerynitian hind, beast with golden antlers, Parrhasian hind, nimble hind of Maenalus and beast of Maenalus. Frazer says that the hind took her name from the river Cerynites, "which rises in Arcadia and flows through Achaia into the sea".

One tradition says that Artemis found a mighty herd of five Ceryneian hinds playing on the base of Parrhasian hill far away from the banks of the "black-pebbled Anaurus" where they always herded. Artemis was so impressed by the hinds that she yoked four of them to her golden chariot with golden bridles, but at the suggestion of Hera let one escape to the Ceryneian hill to be a future labour for Heracles. Whilst in Ceryneia, the hind chased farmers from vineyards.

The Ceryneian hind was sacred to Artemis. "The hind is said to have borne the inscription 'Taygete dedicated [me] to Artemis'." Because of her sacredness, Heracles did not want to harm the hind and so hunted her for more than a year, from Oenoe to Hyperborea, to a mountain called Artemisius, (a range which divides Argolis from the plain of Mantinea) before finally capturing the hind near the river Ladon.

Euripides says Heracles slew the hind and brought her to Artemis for propitiation. Another tradition says he captured her with nets while she was sleeping or that he ran her down, while another says he shot and maimed her with an arrow just before she crossed the river Ladon. Once Heracles captured the hind, and only after explaining to Artemis and Apollo ("who would have wrested the hind from him") that he had only hurt the sacred hind out of necessity, was he allowed to take her alive to Eurystheus in Mycenae, thus completing his third labour.

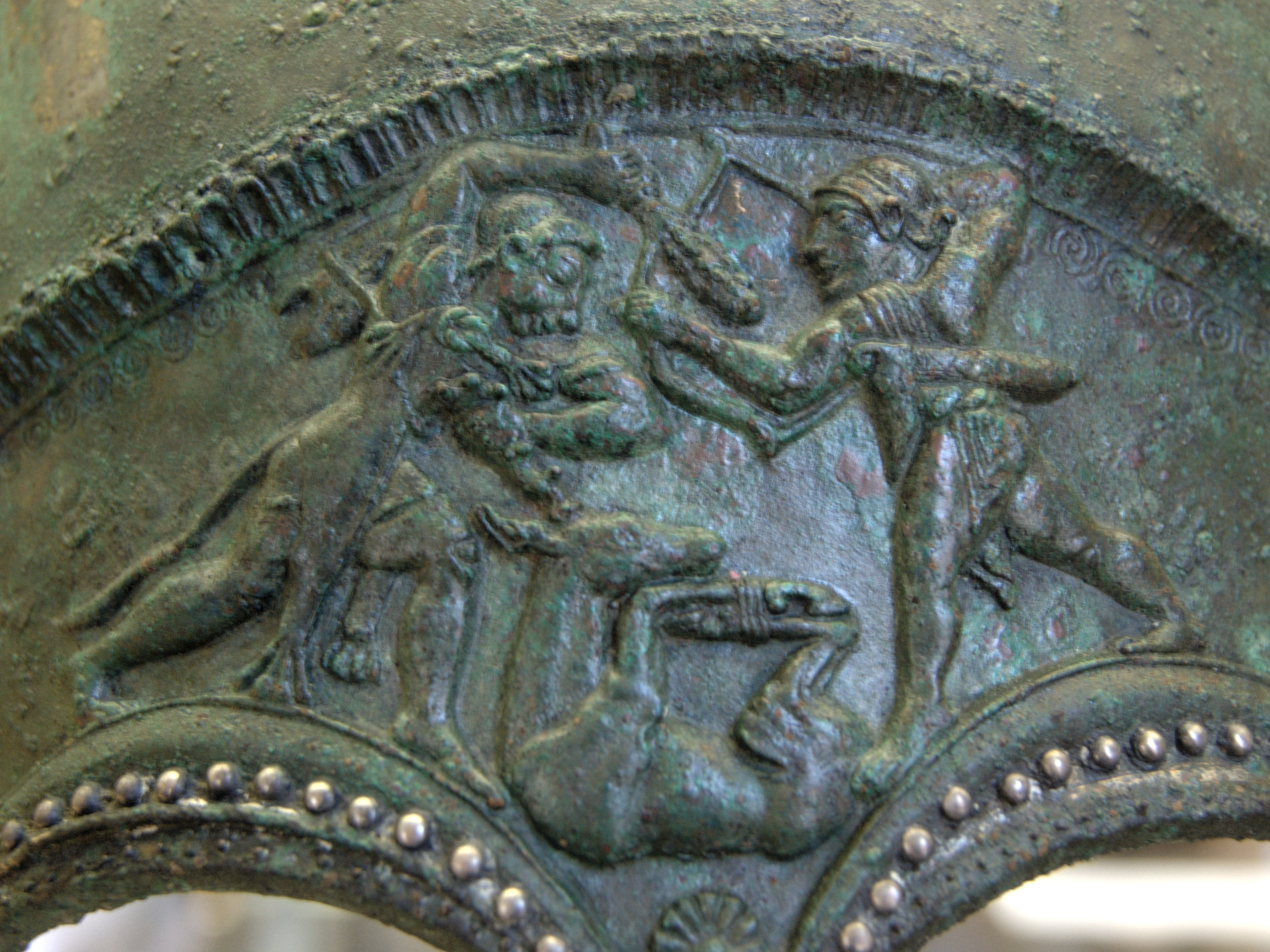
Heracles and Apollo struggling over the Hind, as depicted on a Corinthian helmet (early 5th century BC)

== Art ==
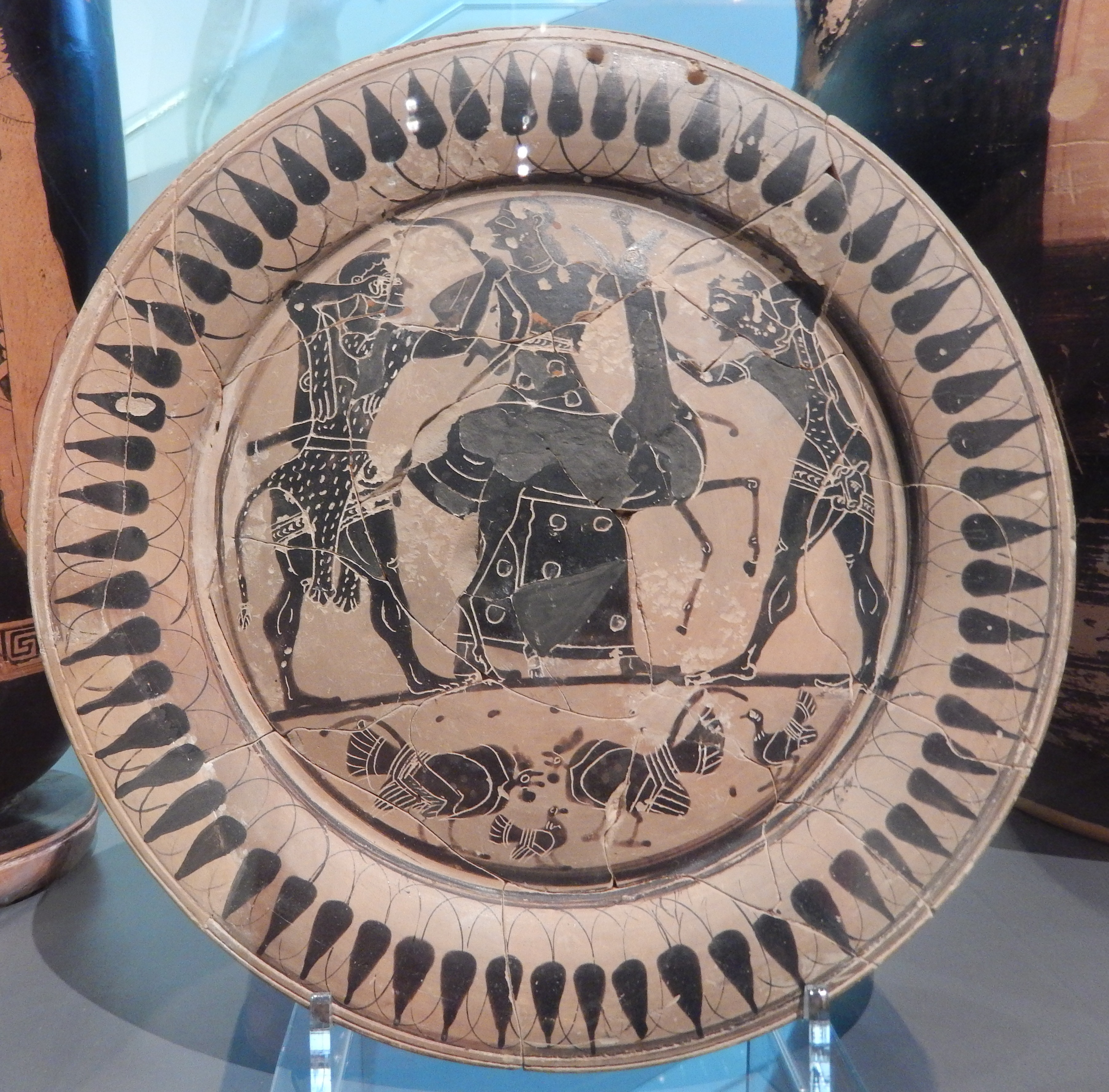
Athenian plate, c. 560 BC

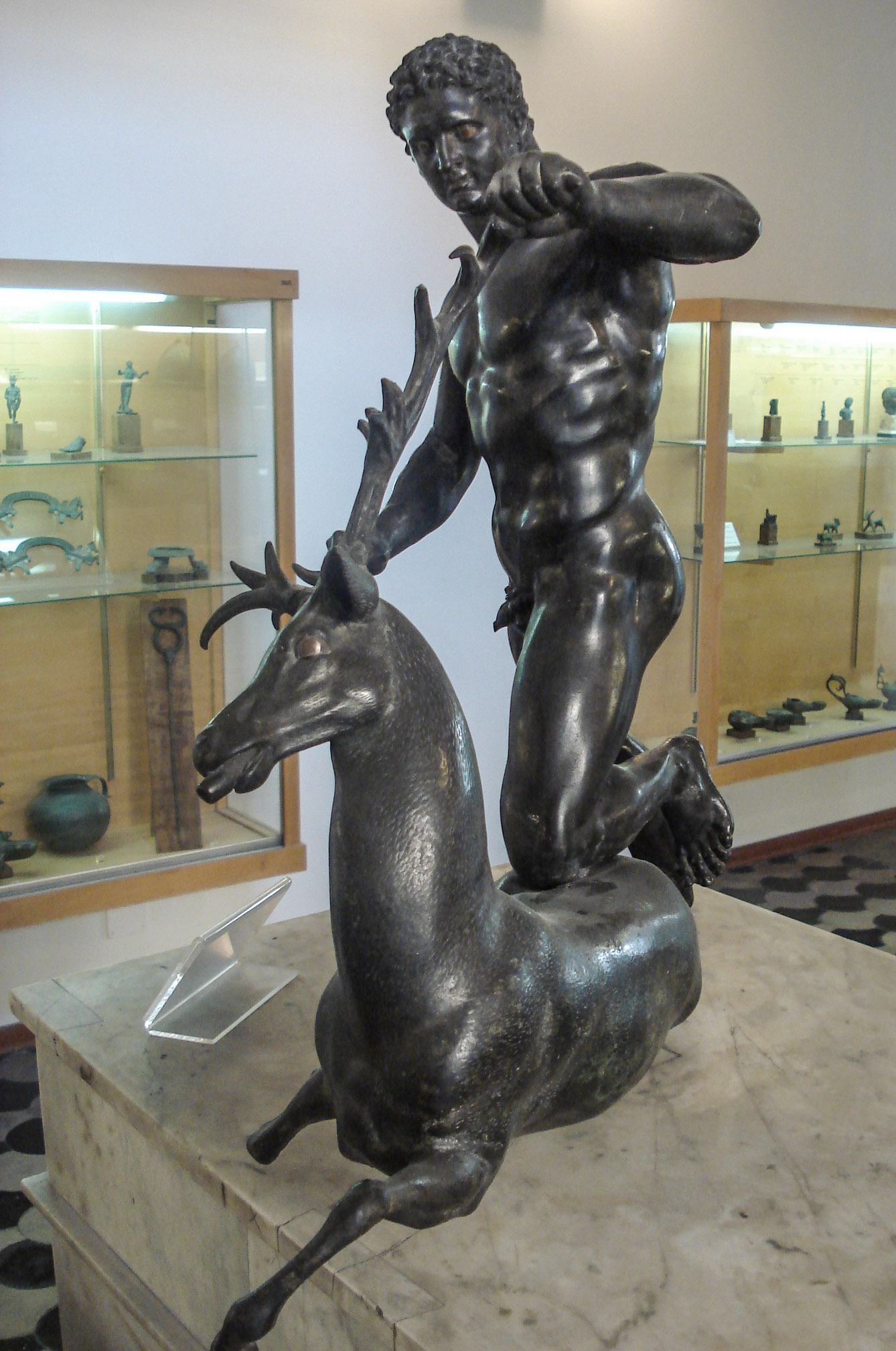
Roman bronze, 1st century BC, probably a copy from Lysippus

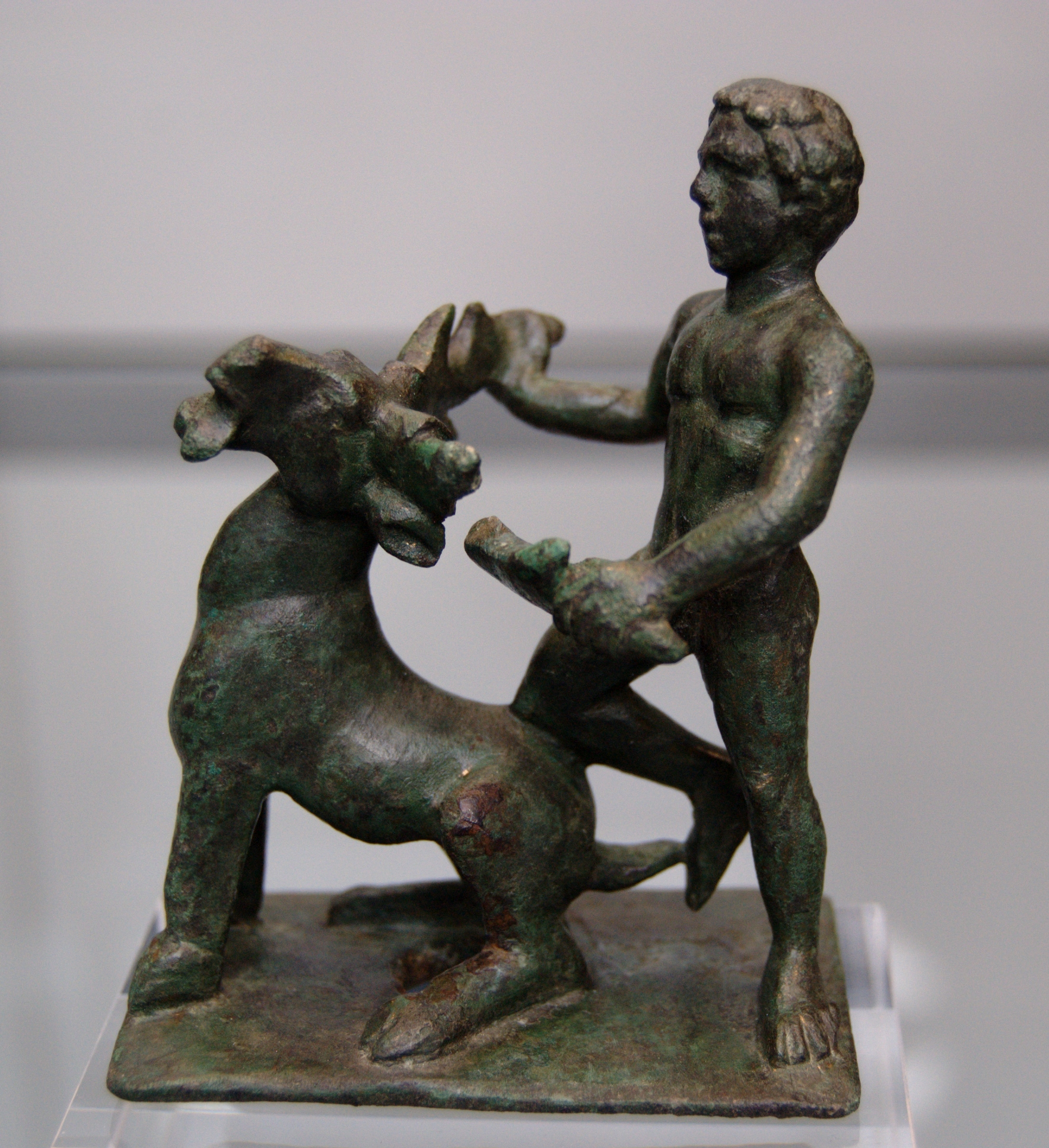
Roman-era bronze, 1st–2nd centuries AD

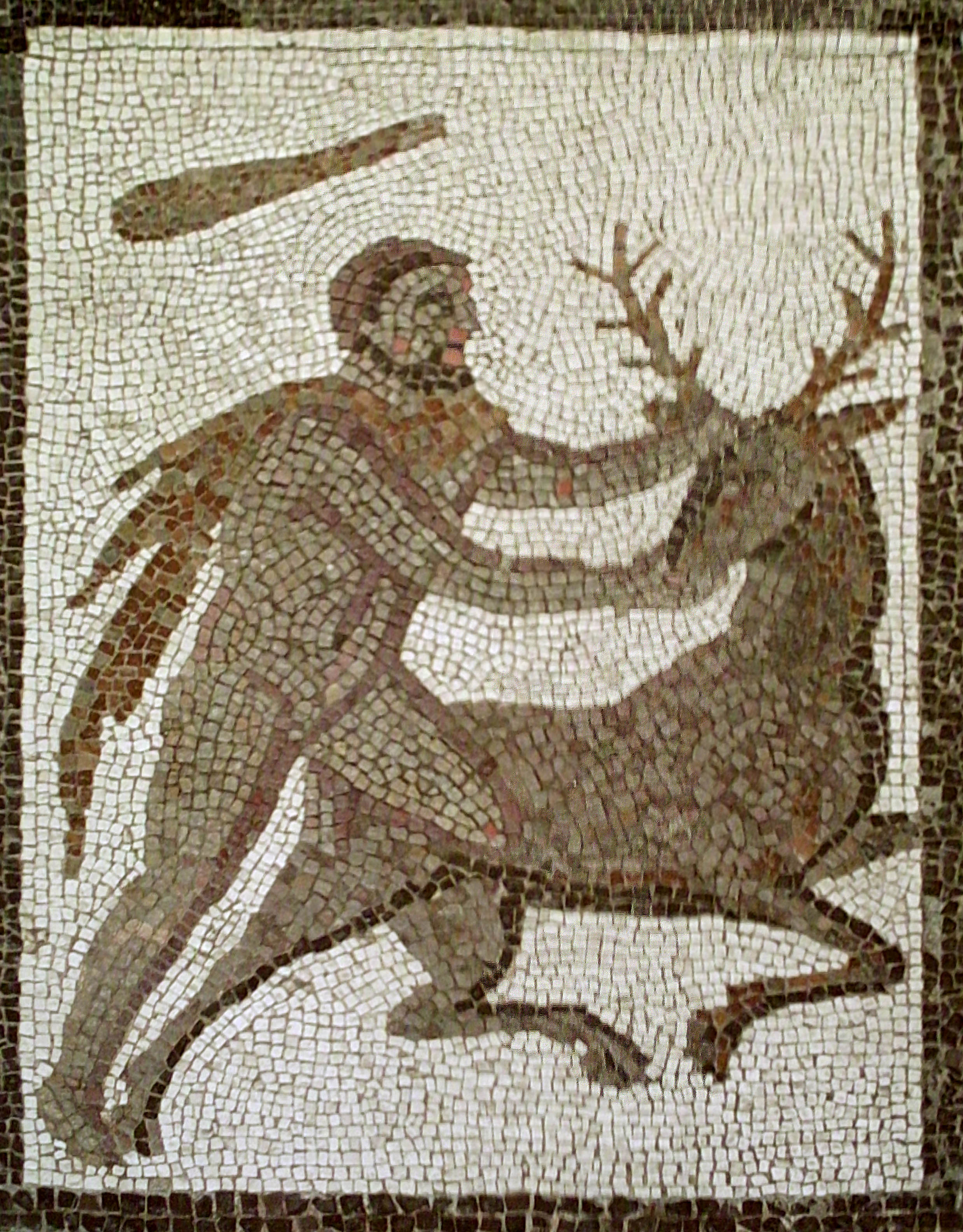
Mosaic from Roman Spain, 3rd century AD

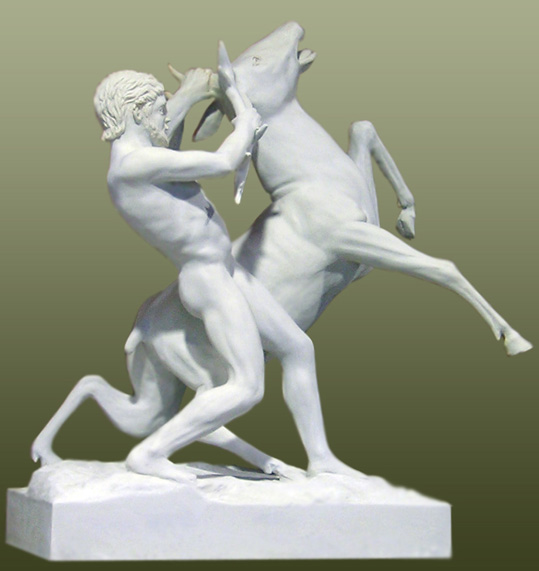
Statuette by J. M. Félix Magdalena (b. 1941)

== Stag or Hind or female deer ==
"Pindar says that in his quest of the hind with the golden horns Hercules had seen "the far-off land beyond the cold blast of Boreas. [Hyperborea]" The theory of Sir William Ridgeway argues that the hind is a reindeer, this being the only species of deer of which the female has antlers" However, Pindar is describing the length and breadth of the chase, not the origin of the deer. This female deer is unlikely to be a reference to a reindeer, since castrated male reindeer are the ones who are harnessed and used as draft animals, not females.

A European female deer bearing antlers, moreover, was not unknown in Greece. Recent scholarship documents this phenomenon both in real life and in Greek culture (with images). Although rare, female deer who experience unusual levels of testosterone, whether in utero or as a result of an injury or illness, can grow antlers. In literature such deer are usually connected in some way with Artemis, e.g. Callimachus' Hymn to Artemis lines 98-106. Further, from the Greek Bronze Age on down, there is visual evidence for female deer bearing antlers, a motif that continues into the Byzantine era, as on a relief sculpture in the Ravenna Archaeological Museum (illustrated at D-DAI-ROM 58.913).

Translations of relevant primary sources describe the creature as a doe, hind, deer, hart, stag, and beast.

== See also ==
- Deer in mythology
