= Bura (Achaea) =

Ancient polis (city-state) of Achaea, Greece

Coordinates: 38°08′31″N 22°13′52″E

Ancient Achaia.

Bura (also Boura, Bira; Ancient Greek: Βοῦρα) was an ancient polis (city-state) of Achaea, Greece, one of the 12 cities of the Achaean League.

It is said to have derived its name from Bura, a daughter of Ion and Helice.

The city was situated on a height 40 stadia from the sea, and southeast of Helike. Its name occurs in a line of Aeschylus, preserved by Strabo. It was swallowed up by the earthquake which destroyed Helike in 373 BCE, and all its inhabitants perished except those who were absent at the time. On their return they rebuilt the city, which was visited by Pausanias, who mentions its temples dedicated to Demeter, Aphrodite, Eileithyia and Isis. Strabo relates that there was a fountain at Bura called "Sybaris", from which the river and city in Magna Graecia, Italy derived its name. On the revival of the Achaean League in 280 BCE, Bura was governed by a tyrant, whom the inhabitants slew in 275 BCE, and then joined the confederacy. A little to the east of Bura was the river Buraïcus; and on the banks of this river, between Bura and the sea, was an oracular cavern of Heracles surnamed Buraicus.

The ruins of Bura have been discovered nearly midway between the rivers of Bokhusia (Cerynites), and of Vouraikos (Buraicus) near Trupia. Ovid says that the ruins of Bura (which he calls Bira), like those of Helike, were still to be seen at the bottom of the sea. Pliny the Elder makes the same assertion. Hence it has been supposed that the ancient Bura stood upon the coast, and after its destruction was rebuilt inland; but neither Pausanias nor Strabo states that the ancient city was on the coast, and their words render it improbable. Seneca claims the sea destroyed the city after a comet appeared in the sky. Modern scholars tentatively identify the ruins at the kastro near Diakofto with Bura.

== See also ==
- List of ancient Greek cities

== Sources ==
- Katsonopoulou, Dora; Soter, Steven (June 1993). "The oracular cave of Herakles of Boura". Archaeologia (in Greek) (47): 60–64.
