= Bura (mythology) =

In Greek mythology, Bura (/ˈbjʊərə/ BURE-ə; Ancient Greek: Βούρα, romanized: Boúra) was a daughter of Ion, son of Xuthus, and Helice. She was the eponym of the city Boura in Achaea.

She is possibly the same as Bura, mother of Atrax by Peneus.
