= Rodia, Achaea =

Rodia Ροδιά
- Community
- Location within Greece
- Coordinates: 38°12′N 22°09′E
- Country: Greece
- Administrative region: West Greece
- Regional unit: Achaea
- Municipality: Aigialeia
- Municipal unit: Diakopto

Population (2021)
  - Community: 436
- Time zone: UTC+2 (EET)
  - Summer (DST): UTC+3 (EEST)

Rodia (Greek: Ροδιά) is a village in the municipal unit of Diakopto, Achaea, Greece. It is located in the coastal plains near the Gulf of Corinth, 4 km northwest of Diakopto and 8 km southeast of Aigio. Rodia has a football/soccer team known as Floga (Φλόγα meaning flame) and it has a communal soccer field.

== Population ==
| Year | Population |
|---|---|
| 1981 | 409 |
| 1991 | 467 |
| 2001 | 431 |
| 2011 | 429 |
| 2021 | 436 |

== See also ==
- List of settlements in Achaea
