= Skouras =

Skouras is a surname. Notable people with the surname include:

- Andreas Skouras (born 1972), Greek-German pianist and harpsichordist
- Charles Skouras (1889–1954), American movie executive
- George Skouras (1896–1964), American movie executive
- Peter Skouras (born 1963), Greek-American soccer player
- Spyros Skouras (1893–1971), American movie executive
