= Keryneia, Greece =

Keryneia Κερύνεια
- Community
- Location within Greece
- Coordinates: 38°12′N 22°07′E
- Country: Greece
- Administrative region: West Greece
- Regional unit: Achaea
- Municipality: Aigialeia
- Municipal unit: Diakopto

Population (2021)
  - Community: 324
- Time zone: UTC+2 (EET)
  - Summer (DST): UTC+3 (EEST)

Keryneia (Greek: Κερύνεια) is a village and a community in the municipal unit of Diakopto, Achaea, Greece. The community consists of the villages Keryneia and Nea Keryneia. It is located 6 km southeast of Aigio and 7 km west of Diakopto. The Greek National Road 8A (Patras - Aigio - Corinth) passes between Keryneia and Nea Keryneia. The town takes its name from the ancient town of Ceryneia

== Population ==
Year	Population	Community population
1981	-	361
1991	112	518
2001	103	435
2011	35	362
2021	72	324

== History ==
Ceryneia was one of the twelve towns of the ancient Achaeans. The city Kyrenia in Cyprus was settled by Achaeans, probably from Ceryneia.

== People ==
- Margos, (c. 300-229 BC) strategos and navarch of the Achaean League

== See also ==
- List of settlements in Achaea
- Ceryneian Hind
