= Dora Katsonopoulou =

Greek Classicist and Archaeologist

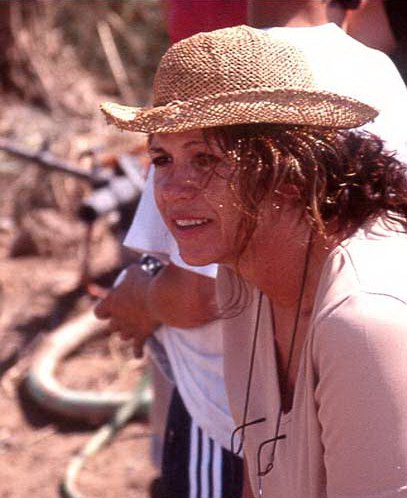
Katsonopoulou supervising excavations at Helike

Dora Katsonopoulou is a Greek archaeologist and adjunct professor at the University of Windsor, Canada. She is known for directing excavations that rediscovered the ancient city of Helike, a classical Greek city destroyed by an earthquake and tsunami in 373 BC. She serves as president of the Helike Society and director of the Helike Project.

== Early life and education ==
Katsonopoulou was born in Aigion, Achaea, Greece. She received her undergraduate degree in history and archaeology from the University of Athens and completed her PhD in classical archaeology at Cornell University in 1990.

== Archaeological work ==
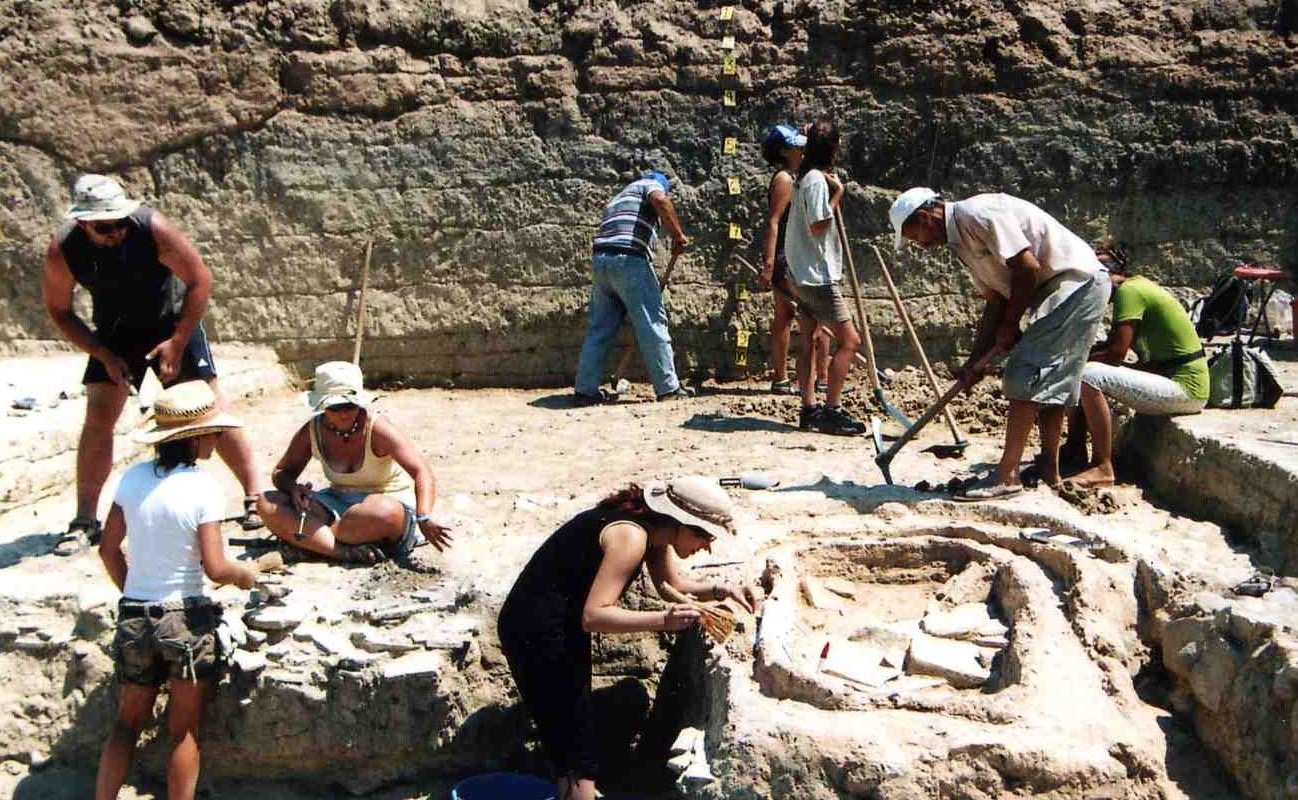
Archaeological excavations at Helike, Achaea

=== The Helike Project ===
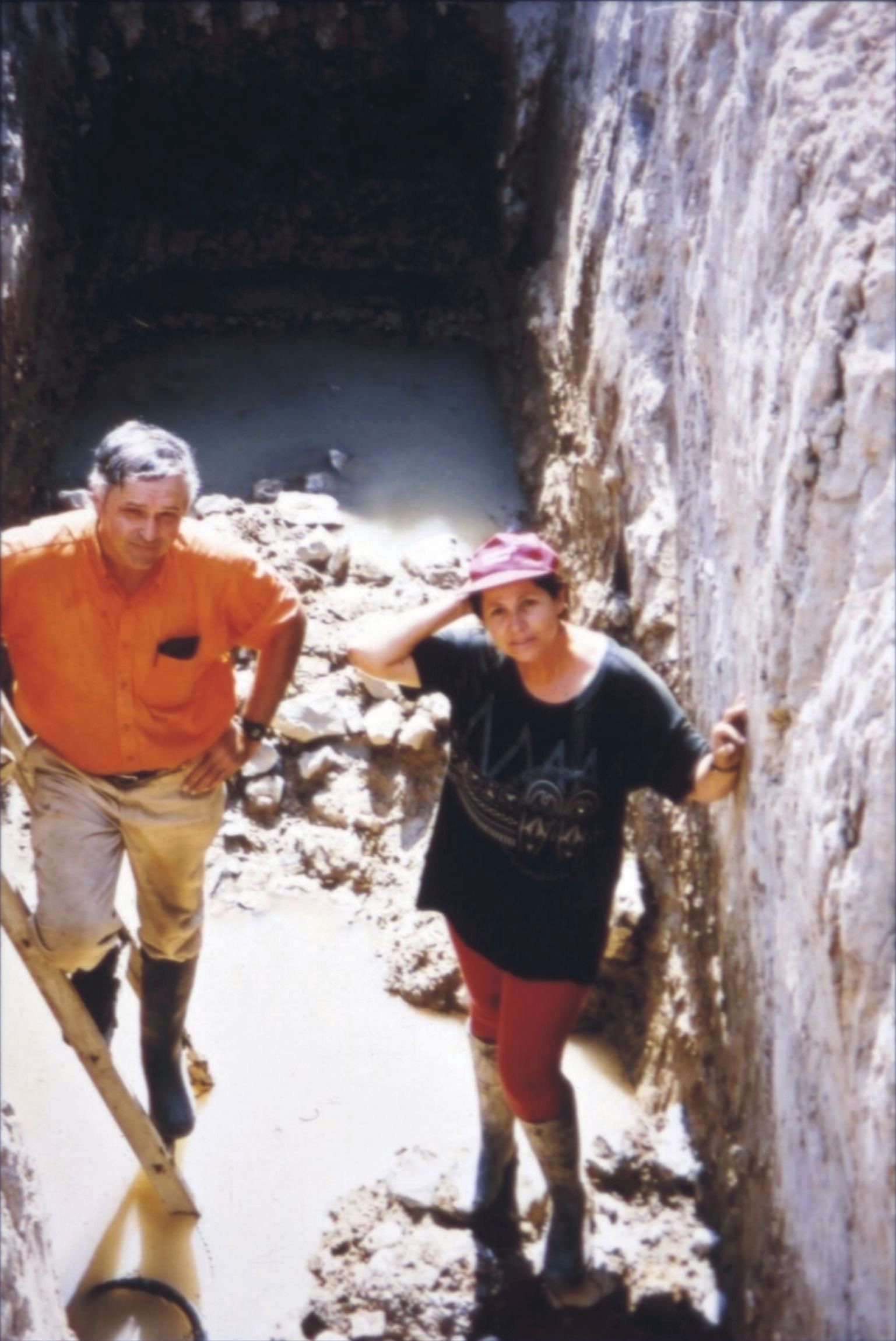
Dora Katsonopoulou (right) with Steven Soter at the Helike excavation site

Katsonopoulou established the Helike Project in 1988 with the aim of locating the lost city of Helike. According to Archaeology magazine, Katsonopoulou has been described as having "the indomitable will of a general laying siege" and "has been eager to find Helike since she was a child growing up nearby." The article noted that "while others have looked in vain, she and her partner, Steven Soter, codirector of the small Helike Project, have been closing in on its remains."

The project combined archaeological excavation with geological and geophysical surveys to locate the ancient city, which ancient sources described as being swallowed by the sea after a catastrophic earthquake in 373 BC. Using remote-sensing technology, the team surveyed buried terrain and located ancient ceramics and evidence of human occupation.

Beginning in 2000-2001, excavations directed by Katsonopoulou uncovered architectural remains, pottery, and numerous artifacts from the Early Helladic period (3rd millennium BC) down to Late Antiquity (5th-6th centuries AD) in the coastal plain near modern Aigion. The discoveries also included remains of textile workshop complexes of the post-earthquake town of Helike, containing many coins, pottery, clay and metal objects.

=== Interdisciplinary research ===
Katsonopoulou's archaeological research has been published in major international peer-reviewed journals. Her collaborative work with geologists and micropaleontologists on the geological and archaeological evidence at Helike appeared in the Journal of Coastal Research in 2008 and Geoarchaeology in 2011. These studies documented evidence of settlements spanning from the Early Bronze Age to Late Antiquity and analyzed the seismic and coastal processes that affected the ancient city.

== Recognition and media coverage ==
Katsonopoulou's work at Helike has received significant international media attention. The discovery has been featured in scientific documentaries including BBC Horizon's "Helike: The Real Atlantis" (2001), Discovery Channel's "Sunken City of Helike" (2023), and Channel 5's "Atlantis: The Discovery With Dan Snow" (2024). The project was also covered by The New York Times in 2000 and 2003, and in Archaeology magazine in 2004.

The Helike archaeological site was included on the World Monuments Fund's list of 100 Most Endangered Sites in 2004, 2005, and 2006.

In 2015, author Mark Adams featured Katsonopoulou's work in his New York Times bestselling book Meet Me in Atlantis: Across Three Continents in Search of the Legendary Sunken City, which explored various theories about the location of Atlantis.

== Other archaeological work ==
Katsonopoulou participated in the excavations of Cornell University at the site of Halai, Lokris, Central Greece. She is also president of the Institute for Archaeology of Paros and the Cyclades, where she has organized international conferences on the archaeology of Paros and its famous marble quarries and sculptural traditions.

== Publications ==
=== Books ===
- Katsonopoulou, Dora (2023). Ancient Aigialeia. Helike Society.

=== Edited volumes ===
Katsonopoulou has edited 13 collective volumes on the archaeology of Helike and Aigialeia, and of Paros and the Cyclades.

=== Selected articles ===
Katsonopoulou has published extensively in Greek and international journals and Conference proceedings. Her work includes contributions to major peer-reviewed journals in archaeology, geoarchaeology, and coastal research.
