= Rizomylos, Achaea =

Rizomylos Ριζόμυλος
- Community
- Location within Greece
- Coordinates: 38°13′N 22°08′E
- Country: Greece
- Administrative region: West Greece
- Regional unit: Achaea
- Municipality: Aigialeia
- Municipal unit: Diakopto

Population (2021)
  - Community: 346
- Time zone: UTC+2 (EET)
  - Summer (DST): UTC+3 (EEST)

The village of Rizomylos, Greece

Rizomylos (Greek: Ριζόμυλος meaning rice mill) is a village in the municipal unit of Diakopto, Achaea, Greece. Its beach on the Gulf of Corinth, 2 km northeast of the village, is well known. Aigio is 6 km to the northwest, and the village Nea Keryneia is adjacent to the west. The Greek National Road 8A (Patras - Corinth) passes south of the village.

== Population ==
| Year | Population |
|---|---|
| 1981 | 381 |
| 1991 | 375 |
| 2001 | 359 |
| 2011 | 366 |
| 2021 | 346 |

== See also ==
- List of settlements in Achaea
