= Vouraikos =

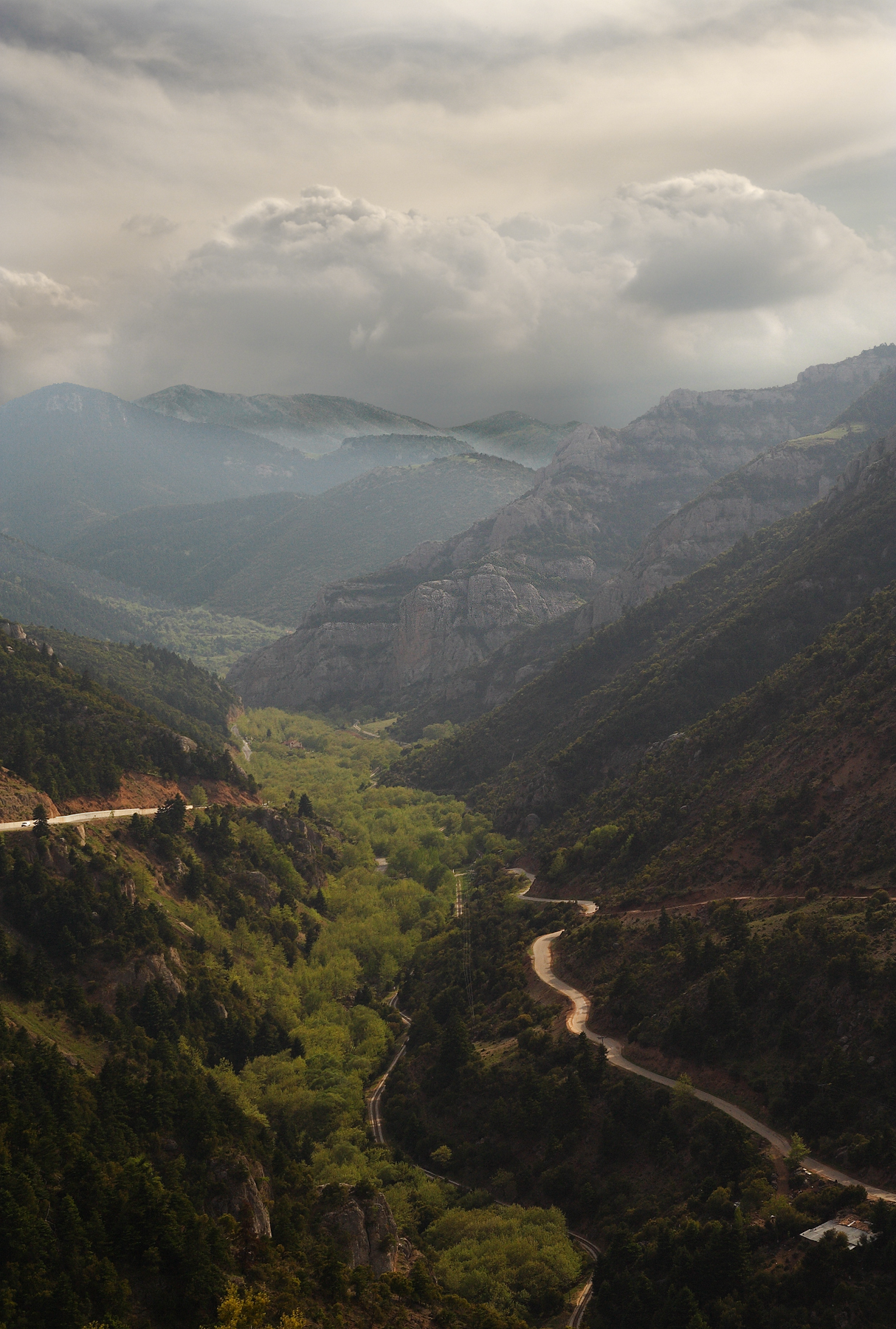
- Native name: Βουραϊκός (Greek)

Location
- Country: Greece

Physical characteristics
- Mouth
  - location: Gulf of Corinth
  - coordinates: 38.2039°N 22.1891°E
- Length: 37.5 km (23.3 mi)

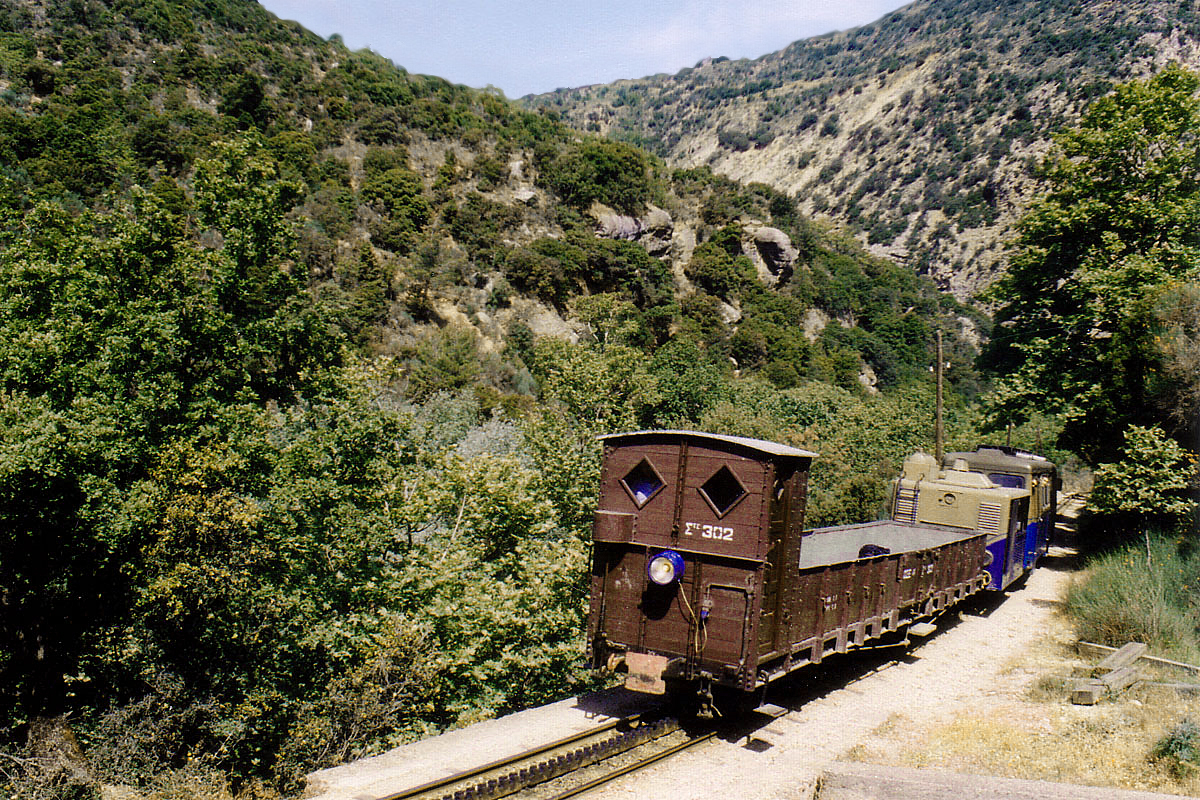
Train in the gorge

The Vouraikos (Greek: Βουραϊκός, Latin: Buraïcus, Erasinus (Ancient Greek: Ἐρασῖνος, romanized: Erasinos) according to Strabo) is a river in Achaea, Greece. In ancient times it was called Erasinos. Its source is in the Aroania mountains, near the village of Priolithos. It flows past the towns of Kalavryta and Diakopto, and flows into the Gulf of Corinth near Diakopto. It is 37.5 km (23.3 mi) long. The name is derived from Boura, a mythological daughter of Ion and Helice who was beloved by Hercules, who according to legend opened the gorge in order to get close to her. This is the Vouraikos gorge, which has a length of about 20 km. In the gorge the river passes along dense vegetation and steep cliffs, waterfalls and caves. The Diakopto–Kalavryta rack railway runs through the Vouraikos gorge.

According to legend there was a cave on the banks of the river which was dedicated to Hercules. There pilgrims came to read their fate in the Tables of Knowledge, as they were called.

The river is mentioned by Pausanias in his Description of Greece.
