= Helike =

Ancient Greek city-state

- Ἑλίκη (Ancient Greek)
- Location within Greece
- 38°13′19″N 22°07′54″E
- Type: Settlement
- Location: Achaea regional unit, Greece

Site notes
- Condition: In ruins

Helike (/ˈhɛlɪkiː/; Ancient Greek: Ἑλίκη, pronounced [heˈlikɛː], modern Greek pronunciation: [eˈlici]) was an ancient Greek polis or city-state that was submerged by a tsunami in the winter of 373 BC.

It was located in the regional unit of Achaea, northern Peloponnesos, two kilometres (12 stadia) from the Corinthian Gulf and near the city of Boura, which, like Helike, was a member of the Achaean League. Modern research attributes the catastrophe to an earthquake and accompanying tsunami which destroyed and submerged the city.

The remains of Helike were rediscovered in 2001 buried in an ancient lagoon near the village of Rizomylos. In an effort to protect the site from destruction, the World Monuments Fund included Helike in its 2004 and 2006 List of 100 Most Endangered Sites.

Recent excavations are revealing parts of the city through the Helike Project.

== History ==
Map of area. Helike marked "Ελίκη".

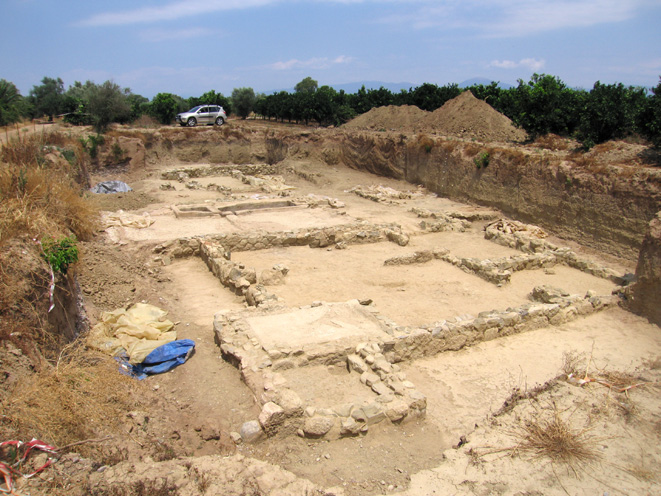
A Hellenistic-era building, possibly used as a dye-works

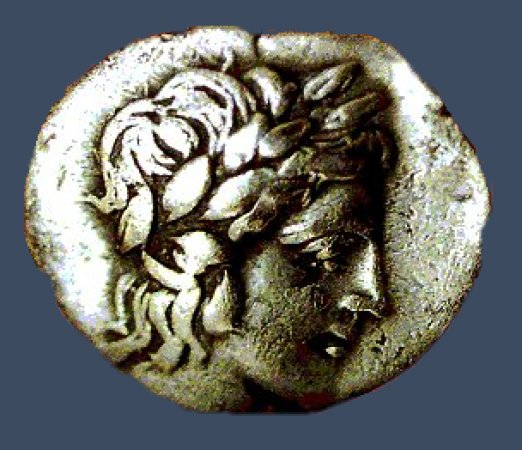
A coin from Helike

The oldest artifacts found at the ruins of Helike are dated to the Early Bronze Age (c. 3000–2200 BC). Researchers from The Helike Project, led by archaeologist Dora Katsonopoulou, excavated multiple layers dating to different periods of Greek history, including an Early Bronze Age "proto-urban town with large rectilinear buildings...[and] cobbled streets", and "walls and occupation layers rich in pottery of the Mycenaean period" (c. 1750–1050 BC). Two excavated buildings contained "religious artifacts" dating as far back as 850 BC, indicating that the buildings were once temples, possibly dedicated to the god Poseidon. In the Iliad, the poet Homer states that the city of Helike participated in the Trojan War as a part of Agamemnon's forces.

Later, following its fall to the Achaeans, Helike led the Achaean League, an association that joined twelve neighboring cities in an area including today's town of Aigio. Helike, also known as Dodekapolis (from the Greek words dodeka meaning 'twelve' and polis meaning 'city'), became a cultural and religious center with its own coinage. Finds from ancient Helike are limited to two 5th-century copper coins, now housed in Bode Museum, Berlin. The obverse shows the head of Poseidon, the city's patron, and the reverse his trident. There was a temple dedicated to the Helikonian Poseidon. Ancient Greeks would travel to Helike to be blessed by Poseidon and to trade.

Helike founded colonies including Priene in Asia Minor and Sybaris in Southern Italy. Its panhellenic temple and sanctuary of Helikonian Poseidon were known throughout the classical world, and second only in religious importance to Delphi.

=== Destruction ===
The ancient account puts Helike's destruction in 373 BC, two years before the Battle of Leuctra, during a winter night. Several events were construed in retrospect as having warned of the disaster: some "immense columns of flame" appeared, and five days previously, all animals and vermin fled the city, going toward Keryneia. The city and a space of 12 stadia below it sank into the earth and were covered over by the sea. All the inhabitants perished without a trace, and the city was obscured from view except for a few building fragments projecting from the sea. Ten Spartan ships anchored in the harbour were dragged down with it. An attempt involving 2,000 men to recover bodies was unsuccessful. Aigion took possession of its territory.

Strabo recounts how the city was submerged by a tsunami triggered by an earthquake, and argued that this was caused by "the anger of Poseidon", because the inhabitants of Helike had refused to give their statue of Poseidon to the Ionian colonists in Asia, or even to supply them with a model. According to some authorities, the inhabitants of Helike and Bura had even murdered the Ionian deputies. An account by Seneca claims the sea destroyed the city after an appearance of a comet.

About 150 years after the disaster, the philosopher Eratosthenes visited the site and reported that a standing bronze statue of Poseidon was submerged in a "poros", "holding in one hand a hippocamp", where it posed a hazard to those who fished with nets. The meaning of poros in ancient Greek is not fully clear, but could refer to an inland lagoon, lake, or narrow strait. Most archaeologists thought it referred to the Gulf of Corinth, but there was disagreement from Dora Katsonopoulou:

For the sea was raised by an earthquake and it submerged Helice, and also the temple of the Heliconian Poseidon, whom the Ionians worship even to this day, offering there the Pan-Ionian sacrifices. And, as some suppose, Homer recalls this sacrifice when he says: "but he breathed out his spirit and bellowed, as when a dragged bull bellows round the altar of the Heliconian lord."

...

Helice was submerged by the sea two years before the battle at Leuctra. And Eratosthenes says that he himself saw the place, and that the ferrymen say that there was a bronze Poseidon in the strait, standing erect, holding a hippo-campus in his hand, which was perilous for those who fished with nets. And Heracleides says that the submersion took place by night in his time, and, although the city was twelve stadia distant from the sea, this whole district together with the city was hidden from sight; and two thousand men who had been sent by the Achaeans were unable to recover the dead bodies; and they divided the territory of Helice among the neighbors; and the submersion was the result of the anger of Poseidon, for the lonians who had been driven out of Helice sent men to ask the inhabitants of Helice particularly for the statue of Poseidon, or, if not that, for the model of the temple; and when the inhabitants refused to give either, the Ionians sent word to the general council of the Achaeans; but although the assembly voted favorably, yet even so the inhabitants of Helice refused to obey; and the submersion resulted the following winter; but the Achaeans later gave the model of the temple to the lonians.

— Strabo, Geographica, 8.7.2

Around 174 AD, the traveler Pausanias visited a coastal site still called Helike, located seven kilometres southeast of Aigio, and reported that the walls of the ancient city were still visible underwater, "but not so plainly now as they were once, because they are corroded by the salt water".

For centuries after, its submerged ruins could still be seen. Roman tourists frequently sailed over the site, admiring the city's statuary. Later the site silted over and the location was lost to memory.

Adalberto Giovannini argued that the submergence of Helike might have inspired Plato to end his story about Atlantis with its submersion. Ancient scholars and writers who visited the ruins include the Greeks Strabo, Pausanias and Diodoros of Sicily, and the Romans Aelian and Ovid.

=== Subsequent events ===
On 23 August 1817, a similar disaster, an earthquake followed by a tsunami, occurred at the same spot. The earthquake was preceded by a sudden explosion, like that produced by a battery of cannon. The aftershock was said to have lasted a minute and a half, during which the sea rose at the mouth of the Selinous River and extended to cover all the ground immediately below Aigio (the ancient Αἴγιον). After its retreat, not a trace was left of some artillery depots which had stood on the shore, and the beach was carried away completely. In Aigio, 65 people died and two-thirds of its buildings were entirely ruined, as were five villages in the plain.

== Rediscovery ==
=== Previous attempts ===
The submerged town was long a mystery for underwater archaeology. People were divided in their opinions about the exact location of Helike and produced numerous works and hypotheses:

In 1826, French diplomat and archaeologist François Pouqueville, who wrote the Voyage en Grèce; in 1851 Ernst Curtius the German archaeologist and historian who speculated about its location; in 1879 J. F. Julius Schmidt, the director of Athens Observatory, issuing a study comparing the Aegeion earthquake which occurred 26 December 1861 with an earthquake which might have destroyed Helike; in 1883 Spiros Panagiotopoulos, the mayor of Aegeion city, wrote about the ancient city; in 1912 the Greek writer P. K. Ksinopoulos wrote The City of Aegeion Through the Centuries and in 1939 Stanley Casson, an English art scholar and army officer who studied classical archaeology and served in Greece as liaison officer, addressed the problem.

Other investigators include in 1948 the German archaeologist Georg Karo; in 1950 Robert Demangel, who was from 1933 to 1948 the director of the French School of Archaeology in Athens; in 1950 Alfred Philippson, German geologist and geographer; in 1952 Spiros Dontas, Greek writer and member of the Academy of Athens; in 1954 Aristos Stauropoulos, a Greek writer who published the History of the city of Aegeion; in 1956 the Greek professor N. Κ. Moutsopoulos; in 1967 Spyros Marinatos, a Greek archaeologist who wrote the Research about Helike and in 1968 Helike-Thira-Thebes; in 1962 the Greek writer George K. Georgalas; and in 1967 Nikos Papahatzis, a Greek archaeologist who published Pausanias’ Description of Greece.

Spyridon Marinatos said that only the declaration of a third world war would obscure the discovery of Helike. In 1967, Harold Eugene Edgerton worked with the American researcher Peter Throckmorton. They were convinced that Helike was to be found on the seabed of the Gulf of Corinth. Edgerton perfected special sonar equipment for this research but permission to search was not granted by the Greek authorities.

In 1967 and in 1976, Jacques Cousteau searched for Helike, with no result. In 1979 in the Corinthian Gulf, the Greek undersea explorer Alexis Papadopoulos discovered a sunken town and recorded his findings in a documentary film which shows walls, fallen roofs, roof tiles, streets, etc. at a depth of between 25 and 45 m. "Whether or not this town can be identified with Helike is a question to be answered by extensive underwater research. In any case, the discovery of this town can be regarded as an extremely interesting find", according to the Greek scientific journal Archaeology.

=== Rediscovery in 2001 ===
In 1988, the Greek archaeologist Dora Katsonopoulou, president of the Helike Society, and Steven Soter of the American Museum of Natural History launched the Helike Project to locate the site of the lost city. Ancient texts, telling the story of Helike, said that the city had sunk into a poros, which everyone interpreted as the Corinthian Gulf. However, Katsonopoulou and Soter raised the possibility that poros could have meant an inland lagoon. If an earthquake caused soil liquefaction on a large scale, the city would have been taken downward below the sea level. Also, if an earthquake caused the sections of coastline to fall into the sea, this would have created a tsunami, which in turn would have flooded the inland lagoon with the city in it. Over time, the river sediment coming down from the mountains would have filled in the lagoon hiding the city remains beneath the solid ground.

Before Helike was rediscovered, a few false starts came along the way. In 1994, in collaboration with the University of Patras, a magnetometer survey carried out in the midplain of the delta revealed the outlines of a buried building. This target (now known as the Klonis site) was excavated and a large Roman building with standing walls was found. Also a well-preserved settlement of the early Bronze Age was uncovered.

In 2001, Helike was rediscovered buried in an ancient lagoon near the village of Rizomylos. Further confirming that the discovered site belongs to Helike, the earthquake destruction layer consisting of cobblestones, clay roof tiles, and pottery was uncovered in 2012. This destruction layer is in good agreement with ancient texts on the location of Helike and earthquake effects to the city.

Excavations are being carried out in the Helike delta each summer and have brought to light significant archaeological finds dating from prehistoric times, when Helike was founded, up until its revival in Hellenistic and Roman times.

Research Published in May 2025 combined archaeological and geological data, to present the first complete seismic history of the Helike Fault over nearly three millennia, identifying previously unknown earthquakes and establishing that major disasters occurred roughly every 300 years between Geometric and Roman times. The timeline revealed a pattern of societal resilience, where inhabitants consistently resettled the catastrophe-prone area by adapting their settlement locations and building methods to the dynamically changing landscape.

== See also ==
- List of ancient Greek cities
- Heracleion
- Iliad a poem by Homer
- Atlantis
