= Movri =

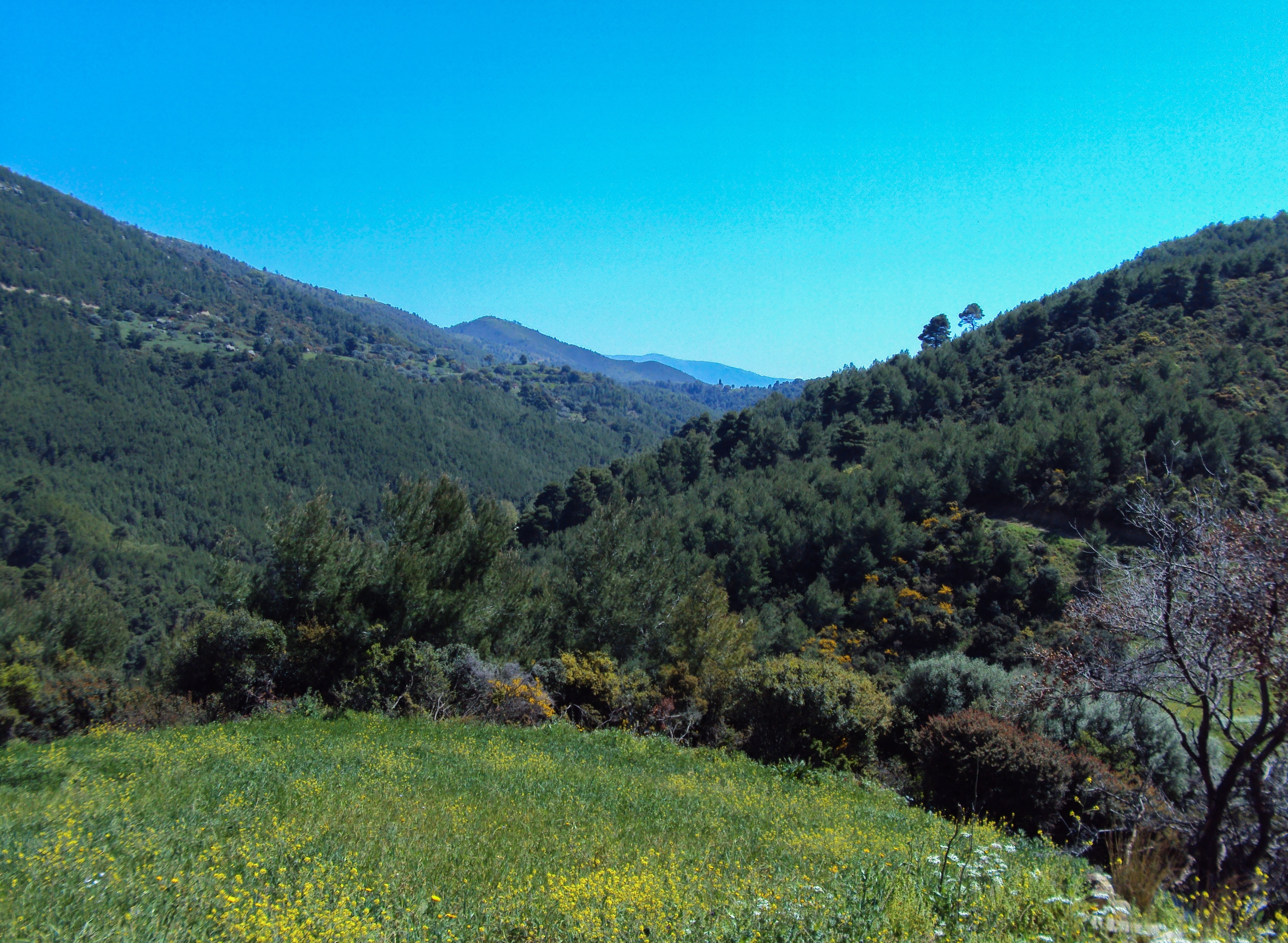

Highest point
- Elevation: 719 m (2,359 ft)
- Coordinates: 38°01′36″N 21°32′37″E

Geography
- Location within Greece
- Location: western Achaea, Greece

Movri (Greek: Μόβρη) is a forested mountain range in western Achaea, Greece. Its highest point is 719 m amsl. It covers part of the municipal units Movri (named after this mountain), Dymi, Larissos and Olenia, all in the municipality of West Achaea. It is located about 30 km southwest of Patras. The higher mountain range Skollis lies to its southeast. The river Larissos has its source in the Movri, and flows to the west.

Villages around the Movri are, from the north clockwise: Myrtos, Vythoulkas, Eleochori, Arla, Fostaina, Polylofo. Ano Velitses, Michoi, Agios Nikolaos Spaton, Mataragka, Riolos, Petas, Krinos.
