= Riolos =

Riolos Ρίολος
- Community
- Location within Greece
- Coordinates: 38°01′N 21°28′E
- Country: Greece
- Administrative region: West Greece
- Regional unit: Achaea
- Municipality: West Achaea
- Municipal unit: Larissos
- Elevation: 100 m (330 ft)

Population (2021)
  - Community: 494
- Time zone: UTC+2 (EET)
  - Summer (DST): UTC+3 (EEST)
- Postal code: 270 52
- Area code: 26930

Riolos (Greek: Ρίολος) is a village and a community in the municipal unit of Larissos, Achaea, Greece. It is located on the northwestern edge of the Movri hills, 4 km north of Mataragka, 3 km southwest of Krinos, 6 km southeast of Lappas and 32 km southwest of Patras. The community includes the small village Mazaiika. The river Larissos flows southwest of the village. During the Greek War of Independence a battle took place in Riolos in which the Greeks, led by Thallis Theodoridis the Elder, were victorious.

== Historic population ==
Year	Population
1981	757
1991	708
2001	801
2011	545
2021	494

== See also ==
- List of settlements in Achaea
