= Serdini =

Serdini Σερδινή
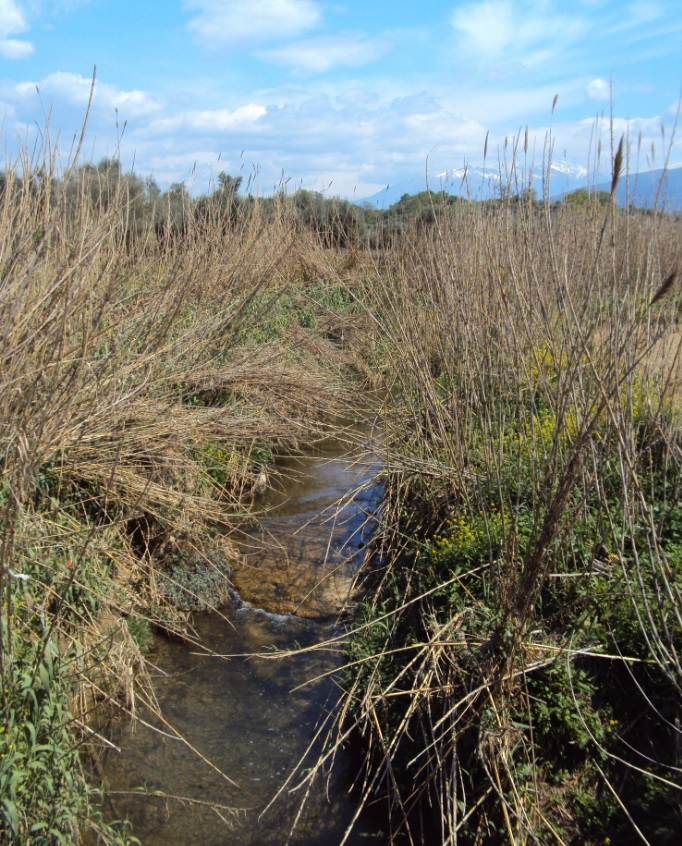

Location
- Country: Greece

Physical characteristics
- Source
  - location: Achaea
- Mouth
  - location: Peiros
  - coordinates: 38.1355°N 21.5745°E
- Length: 15.6 km (9.7 mi)

Basin features
- Progression: Peiros→ Ionian Sea

The Serdini (Greek: Σερδινή) is a small river of western Achaea, Greece. It is 15.6 km (9.7 mi) long. It is a left tributary of the Peiros near Kato Alissos.

== Geography ==
The Serdini flows through the municipal units of Olenia and Dymi, both part of the municipality West Achaea. It rises near the village of Flokas and flows generally north along the villages Arla, Ano Soudenaiika, Avgeraiika, Agios Nikolaos and Lousika. It empties into the Peiros south of Kato Alissos.

In the fertile valley of the Serdini river, several artifacts from the Mycenaean period have been excavated, including a cemetery near Spaliaraiika.
