= Santameri =

Santameri (Σανταμέρι) or Santomeri (Σαντομέρι) may refer to places in Greece:

- Santomeri, a village in Achaea
- Mount Skollis, a mountain in Achaea formerly known as Santameri
- Santameri Castle, a castle and an ancient city in Achaea
- Santameri Castle (Thebes), a castle in Thebes
