= Gomosto =

Gomosto Γομοστό
- Settlement
- Location within Greece
- Coordinates: 38°7.3′N 21°30.2′E
- Country: Greece
- Administrative region: West Greece
- Regional unit: Achaea
- Municipality: West Achaea
- Municipal unit: Movri
- Community: Kareika
- Elevation: 30 m (98 ft)

Population (2021)
  - Total: 227
- Time zone: UTC+2 (EET)
  - Summer (DST): UTC+3 (EEST)
- Postal code: 25200
- Area code: 26930

Gomosto (Greek: Γομοστό) is a village in Achaea, Greece. It is part of the community Kareika and the municipal unit Movri. It is situated 5 km (3.1 mi) southwest of Kato Achaia and 8 km (5.0 mi) northeast of Lappas.

== See also ==
- List of settlements in Achaea
