= Achaea (disambiguation) =

Achaea is a subdivision of Greece.

Achaea or Achaia may also refer to:

== History ==
- Achaeans (Homer), a collective name for the Greeks of the Mycenaean period used by Homer
- Achaeans (tribe), one of the four major tribes of Classical Greece
- Achaea (ancient region), an ancient Greek region in the north of the Peloponnese
- Achaea Phthiotis, an ancient Greek region in southeastern Thessaly
- Achaean League, a league of North Peloponnesian cities during the Hellenistic period
- Achaea (Roman province), comprising Peloponnese and central Greece
- Principality of Achaea, a medieval crusader state in the Peloponesse
- Achaea (constituency), a constituency of the Greek Parliament

== Other uses ==
- Achaea, or Demeter Achaea, an epithet of the goddess Demeter
- Achaea, or Minerva Achaea, an epithet of the goddess Minerva
- Achaea, Dreams of Divine Lands, a multi-player online computer game
- Achaea (moth), a genus of noctuid moths
- 1150 Achaia, asteroid
- Achaia Channel, a Greek local TV station
- Achaia Clauss, a Greek winery
- Achaja, a Polish fantasy series of novels (published 2002–2004)
- Achaia, the main alien race in Another Life (2019 TV series)

== See also ==
- Achaeans (disambiguation)
- Archaea
- West Achaea, a municipality in Achaea
- Kato Achaia (lit. Lower Achaea) and Ano Achaia (lit. Upper Achaea), towns in Achaea
