= 2008 Peloponnese earthquake =

Earthquake in Greece

- UTC time: 2008-06-08 12:25:29
- ISC event: 13231364
- USGS-ANSS: ComCat
- Local date: June 8, 2008
- Local time: 15:25:29 EET
- Magnitude: 6.4 M_{w}
- Depth: 16 km (10 mi)
- Epicenter: 37.96°N 21.53°E
- Type: Strike-slip
- Areas affected: Greece
- Max. intensity: MMI VIII (Severe)
- Casualties: 2 dead; 240 injured

The 2008 Peloponnese earthquake killed two people, injured more than 220 and left at least 2,000 people homeless in north western Peloponnese, Greece, on June 8. The earthquake hit the area at 1525 EET (1325 UTC), with a moment magnitude of 6.5, according to the Athens Geodynamic Institute. It was strongly felt as far away as in Athens and in parts of southern Italy. The US Geological Survey reported that the quake had a magnitude of 6.4. The epicenter of the tremor was located about 15 miles (32 km) southwest of the Greek port city of Patras, at a depth of 16 km. Interior Minister Prokopis Pavlopoulos dispatched rescue and recovery teams (including members of five government agencies), the Red Cross and units of the army in order to assess the damage and the needs of survivors in the earthquake affected areas.

== Earthquake ==
The earthquake of June 8, 2008, was generated by stresses resulting from the motion of the small Aegean Sea plate southwest with respect to the Eurasia plate with a velocity of about 30 mm/y. The boundary between the Aegean plate and the Eurasia plate in central Greece is diffuse. Seismicity is concentrated in east-trending and northeast-trending zones of deformation. The east-trending zones are characterized by predominantly normal faulting. The northeast-trending zones are characterized by predominantly strike-slip faulting earthquakes. The focal mechanism of the earthquake of June 8 is consistent with the shock having been caused by strike-slip faulting similar to that occurring within the northeast-trending zones. Since the beginning of the twentieth century, the largest crustal earthquakes of central Greece have had magnitudes of about 7.2.

=== Damage ===
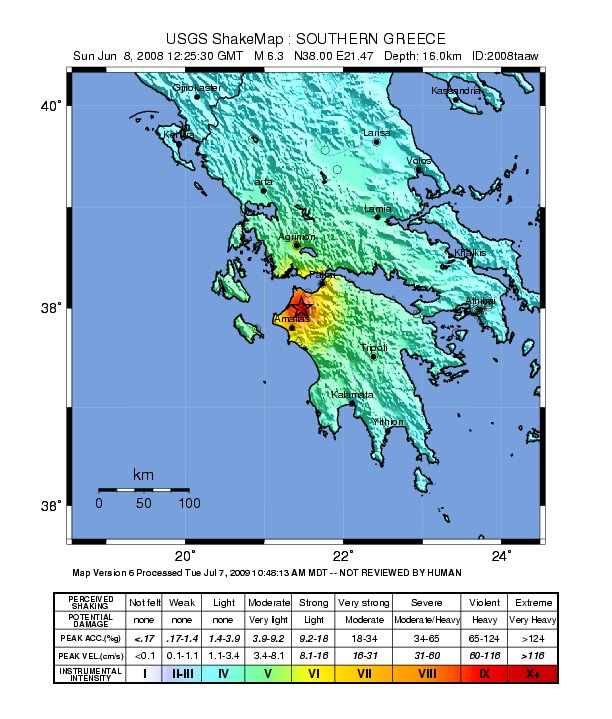
USGS ShakeMap for the event

At least 1,156 buildings damaged or destroyed in the cities of Achaea and Elis. This earthquake generated enough power to cause damage to structures over an area of 2000 square kilometers. It was reportedly felt 350 kilometers away from the epicenter. Within the 2000 square kilometers of the damaged area many landslides and rockfalls took place. Heavily affected villages by this natural disaster were Portes, Santomeri and Valmi. Although there were occurrences of rockfalls and landslides as far away as on the island of Leukas. This island is located 100 kilometers away from the epicenter. The villages of Portes and Santomeri are located at the foot of the mountain, Skollis Mountain. This is a mountain with very steep cliffs of loose rocks such as sandstone, and higher up there are cliffs of limestone. During the earthquake there was significant damage done to these cliffs of the Skollis Mountain. This damage resulted in rockslides and landslides. There is account of limestone rock falling from this mountain, which struck a house in the village of Santomeri and caused serious structural damage, but there were no casualties in this incident.

=== Ground effects ===
A search was conducted in order to locate any damage done to the Earth's surface in the form of surface ruptures. This search was heavily conducted in and around the Kato Achaea train station. The Kato Achaia Train station is located about four fifths of a kilometer from the coastline. This search took place two days after the incident of the earthquake. The search consisted of a mapping of the train station, discussion with a station operator, and a careful process of observing the ground. There was significant notable damage done to the rails of the station. In the northern part of the station there was both compression and extension damage noted on the ground. This did damage to the Kato Achaia train station's rails. Although the rails were replaced before the inspection began. This was done to continue the operation of the station immediately after the earthquake occurred. On the southern side of the station there was obvious evidence of compression damage done to the rails. The movements of the Earth caused the southern rails to buckle together, making them unusable.

== Aftermath ==
The villages of Santomeri and Portes have both been declared hazardous areas. They have been evacuated due to the damage done to the Skollis Mountain by the earthquake. The falling Limestone from the village is a major Hazard, and the government decided that no more risks are to be taken. Along with the evacuation, some of the damage done to the Kato Achaia train station has been repaired in the form of replaced rails within two days of the occurrence of the earthquake. This was to keep the train station in operation.

== See also ==
- List of earthquakes in 2008
- List of earthquakes in Greece
