= Achaiko =

Achaiko Αχαϊκό
- Community
- Interactive map of Achaiko
- Location within Greece
- Coordinates: 38°7′20″N 21°35′55″E
- Country: Greece
- Administrative region: West Greece
- Regional unit: Achaea
- Municipality: West Achaea
- Municipal unit: Olenia
- Elevation: 35 m (115 ft)

Population (2021)
  - Community: 130
- Time zone: UTC+2 (EET)
  - Summer (DST): UTC+3 (EEST)
- Postal code: 252 00
- Area code: 26240
- Vehicle registration: AX

Achaiko (Greek: Αχαϊκό, before 1928: Μπεδρόνι - Bedroni) is a village in the municipal unit of Olenia, Achaea, Greece. It is located on the left bank of the river Peiros, 2 km north of Lousika, 5 km east of Kato Achaia, and 18 km southwest of Patras.

== Population ==
Year	Population
1981	213
1991	261
2001	224
2011	192
2021	130

== See also ==
- List of settlements in Achaea
