= List of English words that may be spelled with a ligature =

This list of words that may be spelled with a ligature in English encompasses words which have letters that may, in modern usage, either be rendered as two distinct letters or as a single, combined letter. This includes AE being rendered as Æ and OE being rendered as Œ.

Until the early twentieth century, the œ and æ ligatures had been commonly used to indicate an etymological connection with Latin or Greek. Since then they have fallen out of fashion almost completely and are now only used occasionally. They are more commonly used for the names of historical people, to evoke archaism, or in literal quotations of historical sources. These ligatures are proper letters in some Scandinavian languages, and so are used to render names from those languages, and likewise names from Old English. Some American spellings replace ligatured vowels with a single letter; for example, gynæcology or gynaecology is spelled gynecology.

The fl and fi ligatures, among others, are still commonly used to render modern text in fine typography. Page-layout programs such as QuarkXPress and Adobe InDesign can be configured to automatically replace the individual characters with the appropriate ligatures. However this is a typographic feature and not part of the spelling.

== Given names ==
Note: The variants Ædith, Cœline and Matthœo were a used (see citations), hypercorrected form of the names.

Non-ligature form	Ligature form	Other forms
Alfred	Ælfred	
Ethel- Aethel- Oethel-	Æthel- Œthel-	(prefix of various names, e.g. Æthelthryth)
Aesop	Æsop	
Cecil	Cæcil	
Cecilia	Cæcilia	
Caesar	Cæsar	
Celine	Cæline, Cœline	
Cornelius	Cornælius	
Edith	Ædith	
Emilia	Æmilia	
Emilian	Æmilian	
Ethel	Œthel, Æthel	
Hephaestus; Hephaestos	Hephæstus; Hephæstos	Hephaistus, Hephestus, Hephaistos, Hephestos
Letitia	Lætitia	Leticia, Letizia
Mattheo	Matthæo, Matthœo	
Edipus	Œdipus	Oedipus
Phoebe	Phœbe	Phoebë, Phœbë

=== ß in given names ===
The grapheme ß was originally made out of the characters long s (ſ) and z, the latter of which evolved into s. In Germany, the grapheme is still used today. Throughout history, various names have been spelled with ß. Many of the spelling variations are hypercorrected variants of other spellings of the name. Nowadays, most of the spelling variations and names are considered archaic or obsolete.

Non-ligated form	Ligated form	Other forms	Gender	Etymology
Agnes	Agneß	Agnesse	f	Derived from the Greek Ἁγνή Hagnḗ, meaning 'pure' or 'holy'.
Andreas	Andreaß	Andreiß, Dreiß, Dreß	m	From the Greek word "andreios", "manly"
Ansgar	Anßgar	Ansgarius (Latinized)	m	From the Old Norse word "Ásgeirr", "god + spear"
Balthazar	Balthaßar	Balthasar, Baltazar	m	From Akkadian "𒂗𒈗𒋀", "Bel protects the king"
Bartholomäus	Bartholomeiß	Barthelmeß, Bartholomæus, Bartholomeß, Berthelmeß	m	From the Apostle Bartholomew
Klaus	Clauß	Claiß, Clauß, Clawß, Klaß	m	A contraction of "Nicholas"
Elsbeth	Elßbeth	Elßgen, Elßlin, Elße	f	Derivative of "Elisabeth"
Endres	Endreß	Enderß, Endereß, Enndreß	m	Derivative of "Andreas"
Erasmus	Eraßmus	Eraßmuß, Aßmus	m	Derived from Greek ἐράσμιος (erasmios) meaning "beloved"
Franz	Franß	Francesco	m	From Latin "Francius" meaning "Frank, Frenchman"
Gillis	Gilliß	Giles	f	From Latin "Aegidius" meaning "a wearer of goatskin"
Hans	Hanß	Hannß	m	A short form of "Johannes"
/	Heinsaß	/	m	(Unknown)
Jarosław	Jaroslauß	Jarosława	m	Composed of the elements jar meaning 'strong' or 'powerful' and sława meaning 'glory' or 'fame'
Jasper	Jaßper	/	m	From Latin iaspis, from Ancient Greek ἴασπις (íaspis)
Johannes	Johanneß	Johann	m	A variant of the Greek name (Ιωάννης) and Classical Latin (Ioannes), itself derived from the Hebrew name Yehochanan, meaning "Yahweh is gracious"
Joss	Joß	/	m/f	From the Old French name "Gosse", derived from "God"
Mathis	Mathiß	Matheß, Matheiß, Mattheiß, Matthiß	m	Means “gift of Yahweh” (from Hebrew “mattath/מַתָּת” = gift + “yah/יָה” = referring to the Hebrew God).
Niels	Nielß	Nils	m	Derived from the name Nicholas
Narziss	Narziß	/	m	From the Greek Νάρκισσος
Nicolaus	Niclauß	Nicklaß	m	Derived from the Greek name Νικόλαος (Nikolaos), understood to mean "victory of the people", being a compound of νίκη nikē "victory" and λαός Laos "people".
Oswald	Oßwald	Oßwalt	m	Composed of two Anglo-Saxon elements, Ōs meaning "god" and weald meaning "rule" or "power"
Paul	Paulß	Paulus, Pauluß	m	From Latin meaning "Small" or "Humble"
Theuss	Theuß	Schultheß, Schulthieß, Thieß	m	From Latin "Thelonius", meaning "Ruler of the people"
Thomas	Thomaß	/	m	Derived from the Aramaic personal name תאומא /tɑʔwmɑʔ/, meaning "twin" and "leader."
Thonis	Thonniß	/	m	Derivate of "Antonius"

== Æ ==
Note that some words contain an ae which may not be written æ because the etymology is not from the Greek -αι- or Latin -ae- diphthongs. These include:

- In instances of aer (starting or within a word) when it makes the sound IPA [ɛə]/[eə] (air). Comes from the Latin āër, Greek ἀήρ.
- When ae makes the diphthong /eɪ/ (lay) or /aɪ/ (eye).
- When ae is found in a foreign phrase or loan word and it is unacceptable to use the ligature in that language. For example, when in a German loan word or phrase, if the a with an umlaut (ä) is written as ae, it is incorrect to write it with the ligature.

Normal form	Ligature form	Other forms	Etymology
acanthaesthesia	acanthæsthesia	acanthesthesia	From Ancient Greek ἄκανθα (ákantha, “thorn”) + αἴσθησις (aísthēsis, “sensation”)
Achaean	Achæan	Achean, Achaian, Akhaian	From Latin Achaeus or Achaius, from Ancient Greek Ἀχαιός (Akhaiós)
Achaemenid	Achæmenid		From Ancient Greek Ἀχαιμενίδης
adhesive	adhæsive		From Latin "adhaerere"
Aeaea	Ææa	Eëä	From Greek Αἰαία (Aiaíā)
aeciospore	æciospore	aeciospore	Neo-Latin aecium from Ancient Greek αἰκία (aikía, “injury, insult”) and Neo-Latin spora from Ancient Greek σπορά (sporá, “seed, a sowing”)
aecidium	æcidium	(aecidium)	Neo-Latin aecidium, from Greek αἰκία (aikia)
aecium	æcium	(aecium)	Neo-Latin aecidium, from Greek αἰκία (aikia)
aedicule	ædicule	edicule (AmE)	From Latin aedicula (“small house”), diminutive of aedis (“a house”)
edifice	ædifice	aedifice (archaic)	From Latin aedificium (“building”), from aedificare (“to build”)
Aegis	Ægis	Egis (archaic in AmE)	Latin from Greek Αἰγίς (Aigis)
Aegyptus	Ægyptus	Egyptus (Biblical)	Latin from Greek Αἴγυπτος (Aígyptos)
emulate	æmulate	aemulate (obsolete)	From Latin "aemulare"
enigma	ænigma	aenigma	From Latin aenigma meaning "riddle"
Aenon	Ænon		From Greek, Αἰνών
Aeolian	Æolian		Latin Aeolis from Greek mythology Αἰολίς (Aiolis)
Aeolis	Æolis	—	Latin Aeolis, from Greek Αἰολίς (Aiolis)
aeon	æon	eon (AmE)	Late Latin aeon, from Greek αἰών (aion).
equal	æqual	From Latin "aequus, a, um" meaning equal	
aerugite	ærugite	(aerugo)	Latin aerugo, from aes
aerugo	ærugo	(aerugite)	Latin aerugo, from aes
aeschynite	æschynite	eschynite (AmE)	Greek αἰσχύνω (aischuno)
aesculin	æsculin	esculin (AmE)	
aesculetin	æsculetin	esculetin (AmE)	
Aespa	æspa		
aesthetic	æsthetic	esthetic (AmE - uncommon)	Greek αἰσθετικός (aisthetikos)
aestival	æstival	estival (AmE)	Latin aestivus, from aestas
aestivation	æstivation	estivation (AmE)	Latin aestivare, from aestivus, from aestas
eternity	æternity	aeternity (obsolete)	From Latin aeternus (“without beginning or end”)
Aether	Æther	ether (AmE)	Latin aether, from Greek αἰθήρ (aither)
aethereal	æthereal or ætherial	ethereal (AmE), aetherial (BrE—rare)	Greek αἰθέριος (aithérios, “of the upper air”)
Aethrioscope	Æthrioscope	Ethrioscope	Greek αἴθριον (aithrion)
aetiology	ætiology	etiology (AmE)	
algae	algæ	algas (very rare)	
Alphaeus	Alphæus		
ambilevous	ambilævous	—	From Latin ambilævus (ambi- ("both") + lævus ("left")), a calque of Ancient Greek ἀμφαρίστερος (ampharisteros).
anaemia	anæmia	anemia (AmE)	
anaesthesia	anæsthesia	anesthesia (AmE)	
anapaest	anapæst	anapest (AmE)	
antennae	antennæ	antennas	
archaeology	archæology	archeology (AmE - uncommon)	
archaebacteria	archæbacteria	archaea/archæ	
Athenaeum	Athenæum	Atheneum (AmE)	
aurorae	auroræ	auroras	
azotaemia	azotæmia	azotemia (AmE)	
bacteraemia	bacteræmia	bacteremia (AmE)	
Caedmon	Cædmon	Cadmon	
caesium	cæsium	cesium (AmE)	
ceremony	cæremony	caeremony (obsolete)	From Latin caerimonia
Chaldaea	Chaldæa	Chaldea	
chaetophorous	chætophorous	chetophorous	
chamaeleon	chamæleon	chameleon	
chimaera	chimæra	chimera (AmE)	
coaeval	coæval	coeval	
curriculum vitae	curriculum vitæ	—	Latin meaning ‘course of life’, vitæ
cyclopaedia	cyclopædia	cyclopedia	
daedal	dædal	dedal	
demon	dæmon	daemon	Greek: δαιμων (daimon)
diaeresis	diæresis	dieresis (AmE)	
Egypt	Ægypt	Aegypt (Archaic)	From the Latinised Ægyptus
encyclopaedia	encyclopædia	encyclopedia (AmE)	
Epaenetus	Epænetus	—	
equal	æqual	aequal (obsolete)	from Latin "aequus"
equasion	æquasion	aequasion (obsolete)	from Latin "aequare", "to make equal"
equator	æquator	aequator (obsolete)	The name is derived from medieval Latin word aequator, in the phrase circulus aequator diei et noctis, meaning 'circle equalizing day and night', from the Latin word aequare meaning 'make equal'.
equilateral	æquilateral	aequilateral (obsolete)	from Latin "aequus"
equinox	æquinox	aequinox (obsolete)	from Latin "aequi + nocta"
equity	æquity	aequal (obsolete)	from Latin "aequitas"
equivalent	æquivalent	aequivalent (obsolete)	from late Latin aequivalent- ‘being of equal worth’
era	æra	aera (BrE - archaic)	Late Latin aera, probably from Latin æs (plural æra)
esteem	æsteem	aesteem (obsolete)	Latin aestimare, "to guess"
estimation	æstimation	aestimation (obsolete)	Latin aestimare, "to guess"
et cetera	et cætera	et caetera, etc., &c.	Latin phrase
eternal	æternal	aeternal (obsolete)	
Ethiopia	Æthiopia	Aethiopia (archaic)	
Eudaemonic	eudæmonic	eudemonic	
faeces	fæces	feces (AmE)	
fairy	færie	faerie (archaic)	
formulae	formulæ	formulas	
fraenum	frænum	Frenum	
Gaea	Gæa	Gaia	
Graeco-Roman	Græco-Roman	Greco-Roman (AmE)	
haemoglobin	hæmoglobin	hemoglobin (AmE)	
haemolysis	hæmolysis	hemolysis (AmE)	
haemophilia	hæmophilia	hemophilia (AmE)	
haemorrhage	hæmorrhage	hemorrhage (AmE)	
haemorrhoid	hæmorrhoid	hemorrhoid (AmE)	
hyaena	hyæna	hyena	
Hymenaeus	Hymenæus	—	
hypaethral	hypæthral	hypethral	
hyperbolae	hyperbolæ	hyperbolas (AmE)	
hypnopedia	hypnopædia	—	
Idumaea	Idumæa	Idumea	From "Edom" (Esau).
Irenaeus	Irenæus	—	
ischaemia	ischæmia	ischemia (AmE)	
Ituraea	Ituræa	Iturea	
Judaeo-	Judæo-	Judeo-	
judaeophobe	judæophobe	judeophobe (AmE)	
larvae	larvæ	larvas	
leukaemia	leukæmia	leukemia (AmE)	
medieval	mediæval	mediaeval (BrE)	
nebulae	nebulæ	nebulas	plural – Neo-Latin → Latin ("mist"); akin to Old High German nebul ("fog") → Greek nephelē, nephos ("cloud")
nymphae	nymphæ	nymphs	
nymphaea	nymphæa	—	
orthopaedic	orthopædic	orthopedic (AmE)	
paean	pæan	pean (AmE)	
paeon	pæon	—	
pedagogue	pædagogue or pædagog	pedagog (AmE), (paedagogue and paedagog exist but are both somewhat archaic)	
pederasty	pæderasty	paederasty	
paediatrics	pædiatrics	pediatrics (AmE)	
paediatrician	pædiatrician	pediatrician (AmE)	
paediatrist	pædiatrist	pediatrist (AmE)	
paedophile	pædophile	pedophile (AmE)	
palaeobotany	palæobotany	paleobotany (AmE)	
palaeocene	palæocene	paleocene (AmE)	
palaeoclimatology	palæoclimatology	paleoclimatology (AmE)	
palaeography	palæography	palaeography (AmE)	
palaeolithic	palæolithic	paleolithic (AmE)	
palaeography	palæography	paleography (AmE)	
palaeontology	palæontology	paleontology (AmE)	
palaeozoic	palæozoic	paleozoic (AmE)	
Panacaea	Panacæa	Panacea (AmE)	
pandemonium	pandæmonium	pandaemonium	
Pangaea	Pangæa	Pangea (AmE)	
parabolae	parabolæ	parabolas (AmE)	
personae	personæ	personas	
Plantae	Plantæ		
premium	præmium	praemium	
pretorium	prætorium	praetorium, also prœtorium	Both forms with æ and œ seen, from Latin, praetōrium
primeval	primæval	primaeval (BrE - rare)	
Quaestor	Quæstor	—	
Rhaetia	Rhætia	—	
septicaemia	septicæmia	septicemia (AmE)	
scarabaeid	scarabæid	—	
scarabaeoid	scarabæoid	—	
subpoenae	subpœnæ	—	
supernovae	supernovæ	supernovas	
synaeresis	synæresis	syneresis (AmE)	
synaesthesia	synæsthesia	synesthesia (AmE)	
Thaddaeus	Thaddæus	Thaddeus	
toxaemia	toxæmia	toxemia (AmE)	
uraemia	uræmia	uremia (AmE)	
vertebrae	vertebræ		
viraemia	viræmia	viremia (AmE)	
Zacchaeus	Zacchæus	Zaccheus	
zoogloeae	zoöglœæ		

== Œ ==
Common form	Ligature form	Other forms	Etymology
amenorrhoea	amenorrhœa	amenorrhea (AmE)	From Greek α (a) + μένόρροια (mēnorroia)
amoeba	amœba	ameba (AmE—uncommon)	Neo-Latin amoeba, from Greek ἀμοιβή (amoibē)
apnea	apnœa	apnoea (BrE)	Neo-Latin apnoea, from Greek απνοια (apnoia)
coelacanth	cœlacanth		From Greek κοῖλος (koîlos, “hollow”) + ἄκανθα (ákantha, “spine”)
coeliac	cœliac	celiac (AmE)	Latin coeliacus, from Greek κοιλιακος (koiliakos)
coeptis	cœptis		On the Great Seal of the United States, Annuit cœptis from Latin, coeptum.
Confoederatio Helvetica	Confœderatio Helvetica		Latin for "Helvetic Confederation". The Roman and now formal name for Switzerland. The abbreviation CH is derived from the initialization of this Latin phrase.
diarrhoea	diarrhœa	diarrhea (AmE)	Middle English diaria, from Late Latin diarrhoea, from Greek διάρροια (diarroia)
dyspnea	dyspnœa	dyspnoea	
ecology	œcology	oecology (archaic)	From Greek οἶκος (oikos, “house”) + -λογία (-logia, “study of”)
economics	œconomics	oeconomics (archaic)	From Greek οἰκονομία (oikonomia, “management of a household”)
economy	œconomy	oeconomy (archaic)	From Greek οἰκονομία (oikonomia, “management of a household”)
ecumenism	œcumenism	oecumenism, rarely ocumenism	
esophagus	œsophagus	oesophagus (BrE)	
estrogen	œstrogen	oestrogen (BrE)	
estrus	œstrus	oestrus	
federal	fœderal	foederal (archaic)	Latin foedus
fetid	fœtid	foetid (BrE)	Latin fētidus
fetor	fœtor	foetor (BrE)	Middle English fetoure, from Latin fētor
fetus	fœtus	foetus (BrE)	Middle English fetus, from Latin fētus
gonorrhoea	gonorrhœa	gonorrhea (AmE)	Greek γονόρροια (gonorrhoia)
homeomorphism	homœomorphism	homoeomorphism (BrE)	From Greek ὅμοιος (homoios) + μορφος (morphos)
homeopath	homœopath	homoeopath (BrE)	From Greek ὅμοιος (homoios) + πάθος (pathos)
homeostasis	homœostasis	homoeostasis (BrE)	From Greek ὅμοιος (homoios) + στάσις (stasis)
homoeozoic	homœozoic	homeozoic (AmE)	From Greek ὅμοιος (homoios) + ζωικός (zōikos)
hors d'oeuvre	hors d'œuvre	—	French hors d'œuvre
logorrhoea	logorrhœa	logorrhea (AmE)	From Greek
maneuver	manœuvre	manoeuvre (BrE)	French manœuvre, from Old French maneuvre, from Medieval Latin manuopera, from Latin manū operārī
oedema	œdema	edema (AmE)	
oeillade	œillade		
oenology	œnology	enology (AmE)	From Greek οίνος (oinos) + λόγος (logos)
oenomel	œnomel		
oenothera	œnothera		
oesophagus	œsophagus	esophagus (AmE)	
oestrus	œstrus	estrus (AmE)	Greek οἶστρος (oistros) ‘gadfly or frenzy’
Oethelwald	Œthelwald		Œthelwald of Deira
oeuvre	œuvre	—	French œuvre, from Old French uevre, from Latin opera
onomatopoeia	onomatopœia	onomatopeia (AmE—uncommon)	Greek ὀνοματοποιία (onomatopoiía, “name-making”)
penology	pœnology		
phoenix	phœnix	phenix (AmE—uncommon)	Greek φοῖνιξ (phoînix)
pretorium	prœtorium	prætorium or praetorium	Both forms with œ and æ seen, from Latin, praetōrium.
subpoena	subpœna	subpena (AmE—uncommon)	Latin sub poena (“under penalty”)
tragedy	tragœdy	tragoedy (obsolete)	Greek τραγῳδία (tragōidía, “goat song” → “tragic drama”)
zoogloea	zoöglœa	-	

== Notes ==
1. The variants that change '-æ' or '-ae' to '-s' are not variants in spelling, but the same meaning of the word with a different way of forming plurals.
2. "caesium" (see article) is preferred by the IUPAC.

Also, ligatures may be used in personal names as well, i.e. Maecenus as Mæcenus etc.
