= Vlacheika =

Vlacheika or Vlachaiika may refer to several places in Greece:

- Vlacheika, Achaea, a village in Achaea, western Peloponnese
- Vlacheika, Troezen, a settlement in the eastern Peloponnese
