= Petrochori, Achaea =

Petrochori Πετροχώρι
- Community
- Location within Greece
- Coordinates: 38°5′N 21°32′E
- Country: Greece
- Administrative region: West Greece
- Regional unit: Achaea
- Municipality: West Achaea
- Municipal unit: Dymi

Population (2021)
  - Community: 678
- Time zone: UTC+2 (EET)
  - Summer (DST): UTC+3 (EEST)

Petrochori (Greek: Πετροχώρι meaning rock village) is a village and a community in Achaea, Greece. It is part of the municipality of West Achaea. It is located 6 km south of Kato Achaia, and 25 km southeast of Patras. The community consists of the villages Petrochori, Karya, Lampraiika, Logothetis, Veskoukaiika, Vythoulkas and Zampeteika. The nearest villages are Ano Achaia to the northeast and Elaiochori to the east.

== Population ==
Year	Village population	Community population
1981	-	849
1991	207	-
2001	443	1,072
2011	177	721
2021	129	678

== See also ==
- List of settlements in Achaea
