= European Junior Chess Championship =

The first chess youth championship in Europe was the yearly European Junior Championship for under age 20. It was played from 1971–2002. FIDE officially introduced the European Junior Championship in 1970 at their Annual Congress and so the 1971/72 edition was the first official European Junior Championship. Effectively, they adopted the 'Niemeyer Tournament', held every year in Groningen since 1962, and re-packaged it. For completeness also the winners of this Niemeyer tournament are listed. The first competition for girls was held in 1977/1978.

== List of winners ==
Year	Location	Boys winner	Location	Girls winner
Niemeyer Tournament
1962/1963	Groningen, Netherlands	(Netherlands) Coenraad Zuidema		
1963/1964	Groningen, Netherlands	(Netherlands) Robert Gijsbertus Hartoch (Denmark) Jørn Sloth		
1964/1965	Groningen, Netherlands	(Netherlands) Hans Ree (Germany) Robert Hübner		
1965/1966	Groningen, Netherlands	(England) Andrew John Whiteley (Netherlands) Hans Ree		
1966/1967	Groningen, Netherlands	(Soviet Union) Mikhail Steinberg		
1967/1968	Groningen, Netherlands	(Soviet Union) Anatoly Karpov		
1968/1969	Groningen, Netherlands	(Germany) Karl-Heinz Siegfried Maeder (Hungary) Zoltán Ribli (Soviet Union) Rafael Vaganian		
1969/1970	Groningen, Netherlands	(Hungary) András Adorján		
1970/1971	Groningen, Netherlands	(Hungary) Zoltán Ribli		
European Junior Championship
1971/1972	Groningen, Netherlands	(Hungary) Gyula Sax		
1972/1973	Groningen, Netherlands	(Soviet Union) Oleg Romanishin		
1973/1974	Groningen, Netherlands	(Soviet Union) Sergey Makarichev		
1974/1975	Groningen, Netherlands	(England) John Nunn		
1975/1976	Groningen, Netherlands	(Soviet Union) Alexander Kochyev		
1976/1977	Groningen, Netherlands	(Czech Republic) Ľubomír Ftáčnik		
1977/1978	Groningen, Netherlands	(England) Shaun Taulbut	Novi Sad, Yugoslavia	(Poland) Bożena Sikora (Hungary) Rita Kas
1978/1979	Groningen, Netherlands	(Netherlands) John van der Wiel	Kikinda, Yugoslavia	(Soviet Union) Nana Ioseliani
1979/1980	Groningen, Netherlands	(Soviet Union) Alexander Chernin	Kula, Serbia	(Soviet Union) Nana Ioseliani
1980/1981	Groningen, Netherlands	(Sweden) Ralf Åkesson	Senta, Yugoslavia	(Poland) Agnieszka Brustman
1981/1982	Groningen, Netherlands	(Denmark) Curt Hansen	Panonia, Yugoslavia	(Soviet Union) Elena Stupina
1982/1983	Groningen, Netherlands	(Soviet Union) Jaan Ehlvest		
1983/1984	Groningen, Netherlands	(Soviet Union) Valery Salov		
1984/1985	Groningen, Netherlands	(Sweden) Ferdinand Hellers	Katowice, Poland	(Hungary) Ildikó Mádl
1985/1986	Groningen, Netherlands	(Soviet Union) Alexander Khalifman		
1986/1987	Groningen, Netherlands	(Soviet Union) Vassily Ivanchuk	Băile Herculane, Romania	(Hungary) Ildikó Mádl
1987/1988	Arnhem, Netherlands	(Soviet Union) Boris Gelfand		
1988/1989	Arnhem, Netherlands	(Soviet Union) Alexey Dreev (Soviet Union) Boris Gelfand	not played	
1989/1990	Arnhem, Netherlands	(Soviet Union) Grigory Serper	Dębica, Poland	(Soviet Union) Svetlana Matveeva
1990/1991	Arnhem, Netherlands	(Norway) Rune Djurhuus		
1991/1992	Aalborg, Denmark	(Bulgaria) Aleksander Delchev		
1992	Sas van Gent, Netherlands	(Belarus) Aleksej Aleksandrov	Hradec Králové, Czechoslovakia	(Georgia (country)) Nino Khurtsidze
1993	Vejen, Denmark	(Russia) Vladislav Borovikov	Svitavy, Czech Republic	(Azerbaijan) Ilaha Kadimova
1994	not played		Svitavy, Czech Republic	(Bulgaria) Silvia Aleksieva
1995	Holon, Israel	(Belarus) Yury Shulman	Zanka, Hungary	(Bulgaria) Maria Velcheva
1996	Siofok, Hungary	(Russia) Andrey Shariyazdanov	Tapolca, Hungary	(Georgia (country)) Maia Lomineishvili
1997	Tallinn, Estonia	(Israel) Dimitri Tyomkin	Tallinn, Estonia	(Georgia (country)) Sofiko Tkeshelashvili
1998	Yerevan, Armenia	(Armenia) Levon Aronian	Yerevan, Armenia	(Georgia (country)) Sofiko Tkeshelashvili
1999	Niforeika, Greece	(Netherlands) Dennis de Vreugt	Niforeika, Greece	(Slovakia) Regina Pokorná
2000	Avilés, Spain	(Hungary) Ádám Horváth	Avilés, Spain	(England) Jovanka Houska
2001	Rion, Greece	(Georgia (country)) Zviad Izoria	Rion, Greece	(Poland) Iweta Radziewicz
2002	Baku, Azerbaijan	(Georgia (country)) Zviad Izoria	Baku, Azerbaijan	(Azerbaijan) Zeinab Mamedyarova

== Notes ==
The main source of reference is indicated beneath each year's entry.

1962/63 - Groningen, Netherlands - (January 1963) - One of the earliest junior international tournaments held at Groningen under the sponsorship of tobacco firm T. Niemeyer. The event was later informally recognised as the European Junior Championship and later still, adopted by FIDE as the official contest. In this edition, there was a strong showing from the Benelux countries, but England's Keith Richardson (7 points), a student at Durham University, managed to take a good second place, after the Netherlands' Coenraad Zuidema (7½). There followed three players on 5½; E. C. Scholl, E. W. R. Abbing (both Netherlands) and P. Ostermeyer (West Germany).

Boys U-20 - 1. Coenraad Zuidema (NED) 2. Keith Richardson (ENG) 3. Eddy Scholl (NED)

--- CHESS magazine No. 430, Vol. 28 p. 193

1976/77 - Groningen, Netherlands - (December 21, 1976 - January 5, 1977) - The event was shared with the contest to determine the World Junior Champion, that particular title going to the top placed player overall, namely Mark Diesen (see World Junior Chess Championship). Ľubomír Ftáčnik finished top European player and therefore took the title European Junior Champion. Tied for 4th-8th places were Daniel Campora from Argentina, Leslie Leow from Singapore, Marcel Sisniega from Mexico and Evgeny Vladimirov from the USSR. Also in the chasing pack - Ian Rogers (AUS), Krum Georgiev (BUL), Attila Grószpéter (HUN), Jonathan Mestel (ENG), Petar Popović (YUG), Reynaldo Vera (CUB), Murray Chandler (NZL) and Margeir Petursson (ISL). Jonathan Speelman (ENG) played one game and was then disqualified, following protests from other countries that England had more than one representative. Of course, his entry had been previously ratified by FIDE.

Boys U-20 - 1. Mark Diesen (USA) 2. Ľubomír Ftáčnik (CZE) 3. Nir Grinberg (ISR)

--- British Chess Magazine No. 5, Vol. 97 p. 222

1977/78 - Groningen, Netherlands - (December 20, 1977 - January 5, 1978) - Taulbut of England won the event on tie-break and the result was also good enough to earn him the IM title. In close contention for a place in the first three were, 4th O. Foisor (ROM) and sharing 5th-8th places, A. Grószpéter (HUN), D. Goodman (ENG), K. Mokry (CZE) and T. Upton (SCO).

Boys U-20 - 1. Shaun Taulbut (ENG) 2. Sergey Dolmatov (USSR) 3. Krum Georgiev (BUL)

--- British Chess Magazine No. 3, Vol. 98 p. 114

1978/79 - Kikinda, Yugoslavia - (January 21 - February 1, 1978) - Among the competitors were last year's champion Bozena Sikora of Poland, the promising 15-year-old Soviet Nana Ioseliani, and the Yugoslav Junior Champion, Dusica Cejic. 14-year-old Swede Pia Cramling beat the second placed Klimova, but was too erratic to join the leading group.

Girls U-20 - 1. Nana Ioseliani (USSR) 2. Eliska Klimova (CZE) 3. Viorica Ilie (ROM)

--- British Chess Magazine No. 3, Vol. 98 pp. 117-118

1978/79 - Groningen, Netherlands - (December 21, 1978 - January 5, 1979) - Sponsored by the Gasunie Company for the fourth successive year. The players found the organisation and playing conditions to their liking. World Junior Champion, Sergey Dolmatov was tipped to win, but was edged into second by home favourite John van der Wiel, a 19-year-old law student. Third placed James Plaskett (ENG) looked like he might catch the leading pair, but lost to Margeir Petursson (ISL) in round 11.

Boys U-20 - 1. John van der Wiel (NED) 2. Sergey Dolmatov (USSR) 3. James Plaskett (ENG)

--- British Chess Magazine No. 2, Vol. 99 pp. 72 - 75

1986/87 - Groningen, Netherlands - (December 1986 - January 1987) - The winner Ivanchuk began with 5 straight wins, and gave early notice of his natural talent. In the last round, he drew with Blatny (CZE) and this allowed home nation representative Piket (NED) to leapfrog into second place by beating Ninov (BUL). Ivan Sokolov (BIH) took a share of 3rd-5th places. There was a lower than normal entry of 30.

Boys U-20 - 1. Vasily Ivanchuk (USSR) 2. Jeroen Piket (NED) 3. Jacek Gdański (POL)

--- British Chess Magazine No. 2, Vol. 107 p. 69

== See also ==
- European Individual Chess Championship
- European Senior Chess Championship
- European Youth Chess Championship
- European Team Chess Championship
- World Junior Chess Championship
- World Senior Chess Championship
