= Patrini =

Patrini may refer to:

- Patrini, area around Santameri Castle, Greece
- Patrini, character in In the French Style
