= Elaiochori, Achaea =

Elaiochori Ελαιοχώρι
- Community
- Location within Greece
- Coordinates: 38°5′N 21°34′E
- Country: Greece
- Administrative region: West Greece
- Regional unit: Achaea
- Municipality: West Achaea
- Municipal unit: Dymi

Population (2021)
  - Community: 187
- Time zone: UTC+2 (EET)
  - Summer (DST): UTC+3 (EEST)

Elaiochori (Greek: Ελαιοχώρι) is a village in the municipality of West Achaea in Greece. It is located about 7 km south of Kato Achaia and 23 km southwest of Patras. The nearest larger village is Petrochori, 3 km to the west. Elaiochori is the birthplace of the leader of the military government that ruled the country from 1967 to 1973, Georgios Papadopoulos.

== Population ==
Year	Population
1981	243
1991	307
2001	298
2011	238
2021	187

== See also ==
- List of settlements in Achaea
