= Kapeli =

Kapeli Κάπελη
- Settlement
- Location within Greece
- Coordinates: 38°7.6′N 21°33.2′E
- Country: Greece
- Administrative region: West Greece
- Regional unit: Achaea
- Municipality: West Achaea
- Municipal unit: Dymi
- Community: Agiovlasitika
- Elevation: 40 m (130 ft)

Population (2021)
  - Total: 60
- Time zone: UTC+2 (EET)
  - Summer (DST): UTC+3 (EEST)
- Postal code: 252 00
- Area code: 26930
- Vehicle registration: AX

Kapeli (Greek: Κάπελη), is a village in the municipal unit of Dymi in Achaea. The village lies 2 km south from Kato Achaia and 1 km northwest of Agiovlasitika.

== Historical population ==
Year	Population
1991	68
2001	76
2011	36
2021	60

== See also ==
- List of settlements in Achaea
