= Niforeika =

Niforeika Νιφορέικα
- Community
- Location within Greece
- Coordinates: 38°9′N 21°31′E
- Country: Greece
- Administrative region: West Greece
- Regional unit: Achaea
- Municipality: West Achaea
- Municipal unit: Dymi
- Elevation: 28 m (92 ft)

Population (2021)
  - Community: 611
- Time zone: UTC+2 (EET)
  - Summer (DST): UTC+3 (EEST)
- Postal code: 252 00
- Area code: 26930

Niforeika (Greek: Νιφορέικα, also Νιφοραίικα) is a village and a community in the municipality of West Achaea in northwestern Achaea, Greece. It is located near the Gulf of Patras, 4 km east of Limnochori, 3 km west of Kato Achaia and 22 km southwest of Patras. The distance from the Greek National Road 9 (Patras - Pyrgos) is about 4 km. The community consists of the villages Niforeika and Paralia Niforeikon.

== See also ==
- List of settlements in Achaea
