= Limnochori, Achaea =

Limnochori Λιμνοχώρι
- Community
- Location within Greece
- Coordinates: 38°8′N 21°29′E
- Country: Greece
- Administrative region: West Greece
- Regional unit: Achaea
- Municipality: West Achaea
- Municipal unit: Movri
- Elevation: 20 m (66 ft)

Population (2021)
  - Community: 1,300
- Time zone: UTC+2 (EET)
  - Summer (DST): UTC+3 (EEST)
- Postal code: 250 05
- Area code: 26930
- Vehicle registration: AX

Limnochori (Greek: Λιμνοχώρι, before 1928: Στριγκλέικα - Strigkleika) is a village and a community in the municipal unit of Movri in Achaea, Greece. The community consists of the villages Limnochori, Kalamaki, Kato Limnochori and Paralia Kalamakiou. It is located in the plains near the Gulf of Patras. It is 4 km north of Sageika, 4 km southeast of Lakkopetra, 6 km west of Kato Achaia and 4 km east of Araxos Airport.

== Population ==
Year	Village population	Community population
1981	-	1,285
1991	337	-
2001	373	1,213
2011	278	965
2021	411	1,300

== See also ==
- List of settlements in Achaea
