= Apideonas =

Apideonas Απιδεώνας
- Community
- Location within Greece
- Coordinates: 38°04′N 21°25′E
- Country: Greece
- Administrative region: West Greece
- Regional unit: Achaea
- Municipality: West Achaea
- Municipal unit: Larissos

Population (2021)
  - Community: 314
- Time zone: UTC+2 (EET)
  - Summer (DST): UTC+3 (EEST)

Apideonas (Greek: Απιδεώνας) is a village in the municipal unit of Larissos, in Achaea, Greece. It is located in the plains near the Ionian Sea, 3 km southeast of Lappas, 7 km northeast of Varda and 33 km southwest of Patras. The name comes from απιδιά (apidia) meaning "wild pear". The village was founded in 1924, when the government of Greece brought in forty families of refugees from Asia Minor. Before, the area was part of a royal estate.

== Population ==
Year	Population
1981	329
1991	411
2001	635
2011	309
2021	314

== See also ==
- List of settlements in Achaea
