= Larissos (river) =

Location
- Country: Greece
- Region: Achaea

Physical characteristics
- Source
  - location: Movri
- Mouth
  - location: Ionian Sea
  - coordinates: 38.1619°N 21.3651°E
- Length: 19.5 km (12.1 mi)

The Larissos (Greek: Λάρισσος, also Riolitiko, Latin: Larisus) is a river in the western part of Achaea, southern Greece. Its source is on the western slope of the mountain Movri, near the village of Mataragka. It flows through the Prokopos lagoon, and empties into the Ionian Sea in the village of Kalogria. Other villages along its course are Kagkadi, Apideonas and Lappas. Its entire course lies within the municipal unit Larissos, which took its name from the river. It is 19.5 km (12.1 mi) long.

== History ==
In antiquity it was the boundary between Achaea and Elis. Near the river the ancient city Dyme was located.
