= Sageika =

Sageika Σαγέικα
- Community
- Location within Greece
- Coordinates: 38°6′N 21°28′E
- Country: Greece
- Administrative region: West Greece
- Regional unit: Achaea
- Municipality: West Achaea
- Municipal unit: Movri
- Elevation: 29 m (95 ft)

Population (2021)
  - Community: 2,161
- Time zone: UTC+2 (EET)
  - Summer (DST): UTC+3 (EEST)
- Postal code: 250 05
- Area code: 26930
- Vehicle registration: AX

Sageika (Greek: Σαγέικα, also: Σαγαίικα - Sagaiika) is a village and a community in the municipal unit of Movri, western Achaea, Greece. It is located in the plains between the Movri hills and the Gulf of Patras. It is 3 km west of Kareika, 6 km east of Metochi, 9 km southwest of Kato Achaia and 28 km southwest of Patras. The Greek National Road 9 (Patras - Pyrgos) runs through the village.

Sageika was the seat of the municipality of Movri, named for the Movri hills south of the village. The municipality was created under the Kapodistrias reform in 1998. The community Sageika consists of the villages Sageika, Apostoloi, Bouteika, Vrachneika, Gerouseika and Stathmos.

== Population ==
Year	Village population	Community population
1981	1,319	-
1991	1,188	-
2001	1,012	1,776
2011	1,038	1,868
2021	1,210	2,161

== See also ==
- List of settlements in Achaea
