= Kareika =

Kareika Καρέικα
- Community
- Location within Greece
- Coordinates: 38°6′N 21°30′E
- Country: Greece
- Administrative region: West Greece
- Regional unit: Achaea
- Municipality: West Achaea
- Municipal unit: Movri
- Elevation: 45 m (148 ft)

Population (2021)
  - Community: 661
- Time zone: UTC+2 (EET)
  - Summer (DST): UTC+3 (EEST)
- Postal code: 250 05
- Area code: 26930
- Vehicle registration: AX

Kareika (Greek: Καρέικα, also: Καράιικα - Karaiika) is a village and a community in the municipal unit of Movri, Achaea, Greece. The community consists of the villages Kareika, Gomosto, Karamesineika and Rachi. It is located north of the Movri hills, 3 km east of Sageika, 6 km southwest of Kato Achaia and 25 km southwest of Patras. The Greek National Road 9/E55 (Patras - Pyrgos) passes through the community.

== Population ==
Year	Population village	Population community
1981	-	829
1991	225	-
2001	237	947
2011	174	726
2021	147	661

The population in 2021 by village:

- Kareika, pop. 147
- Gomosto, pop. 227
- Karamesineika, pop. 151
- Rachi, pop. 136

== See also ==
- List of settlements in Achaea
