= Agiovlasitika =

Agiovlasitika Αγιοβλασίτικα
- Community
- Location within Greece
- Coordinates: 38°7′N 21°33′E
- Country: Greece
- Administrative region: West Greece
- Regional unit: Achaea
- Municipality: West Achaea
- Municipal unit: Dymi
- Elevation: 31 m (102 ft)

Population (2021)
  - Community: 263
- Time zone: UTC+2 (EET)
  - Summer (DST): UTC+3 (EEST)
- Postal code: 252 00
- Area code: 26240
- Vehicle registration: AX

Agiovlasitika (Greek: Αγιοβλασίτικα) is a village in Achaea, Greece. Agiovlasitika is in the municipality of West Achaea. It is located about 3 km southeast of Kato Achaia, and 20 km southwest of Patras. The river Peiros flows northeast of the village. The community consists of the villages Agiovlasitika, Kapeli, Lefkos and Stenaitika.

== Population ==
| Year | Village | Municipal district |
|---|---|---|
| 1981 | - | 338 |
| 1991 | 68 | - |
| 2001 | 115 | 363 |
| 2011 | 84 | 241 |
| 2021 | 99 | 263 |

== See also ==
- List of settlements in Achaea
