= Agios Nikolaos Spaton =

Agios Nikolaos Spaton Άγιος Νικόλαος Σπάτων
- Community
- Location within Greece
- Coordinates: 38°0′20″N 21°30′45″E
- Country: Greece
- Administrative region: West Greece
- Regional unit: Achaea
- Municipality: West Achaea
- Municipal unit: Larissos

Population (2021)
  - Community: 209
- Time zone: UTC+2 (EET)
  - Summer (DST): UTC+3 (EEST)

Agios Nikolaos Spaton (Greek: Άγιος Νικόλαος Σπάτων) is a village and former community of Achaea, southwestern Greece. It is part of the municipal unit of Larissos within the municipality West Achaea. As of 2021, the community Agios Nikolaos Spaton had 209 inhabitants, of which 145 in the village Agios Nikolaos, 56 in the village Agios Konstantinos and 8 in the Monastery of Saint Nicholas. The name of the village was Spata until 17 January 1957. The Monastery of St. Nicholas is a short distance from the village, which gave it its current name. Agios Nikolaos Spaton was an independent community until 1997, when it became part of Larissos.

The monastery was built about 200 years ago, on the site of where they found the holy image of Saint Nicholas, causing further development. There are two versions that tell the story of how the icon was found. The first is that the icon was found by a single shepherd who followed one of his animals, leading him to the source of saint from which it drank water. The second that other shepherds were herding their animals across the monastery mountain when they suddenly saw a flash that traveled from west to east, ending at the location the monastery now stands. Upon investigation, they found the icon at that site.

== Celebration ==
In Orthodox Christianity the day of honor to Saint Nicholas is 6 December. Orthodox Christians honour saint Nicholas on 10 May and in some places on 20 May. Saint Nicholas of Spata celebrates two of those days (6 December and 10 May). The great pilgrimage is during May.

== Pilgrimage ==
The road to Saint Nicholas of Spata is widely famous in Greece and especially in Western Greece. Every year a week before and a week after of the celebration of Saint Nicholas on 10 May, many people from all around Greece travel the route of Saint Nicholas. The pilgrimage of Saint Nicholas is also famous in Italy and Cyprus.
