= Krinos, Achaea =

Krinos Κρίνος
- Community
- Location within Greece
- Coordinates: 38°4′N 21°30′E
- Country: Greece
- Administrative region: West Greece
- Regional unit: Achaea
- Municipality: West Achaea
- Municipal unit: Movri

Population (2021)
  - Community: 313
- Time zone: UTC+2 (EET)
  - Summer (DST): UTC+3 (EEST)
- Vehicle registration: AX

Krinos (Greek: Κρίνος) is a village in the municipal unit of Movri, Achaea, Greece. It is located 5 km southeast of Sageika and 30 km southwest of Patras, on the northwestern slope of mount Movri.

== Population ==
| Year | Population |
|---|---|
| 1981 | 370 |
| 1991 | 393 |
| 2001 | 326 |
| 2011 | 303 |
| 2021 | 313 |

== See also ==
- List of settlements in Achaea
