= Fostaina =

Fostaina Φώσταινα
- Community
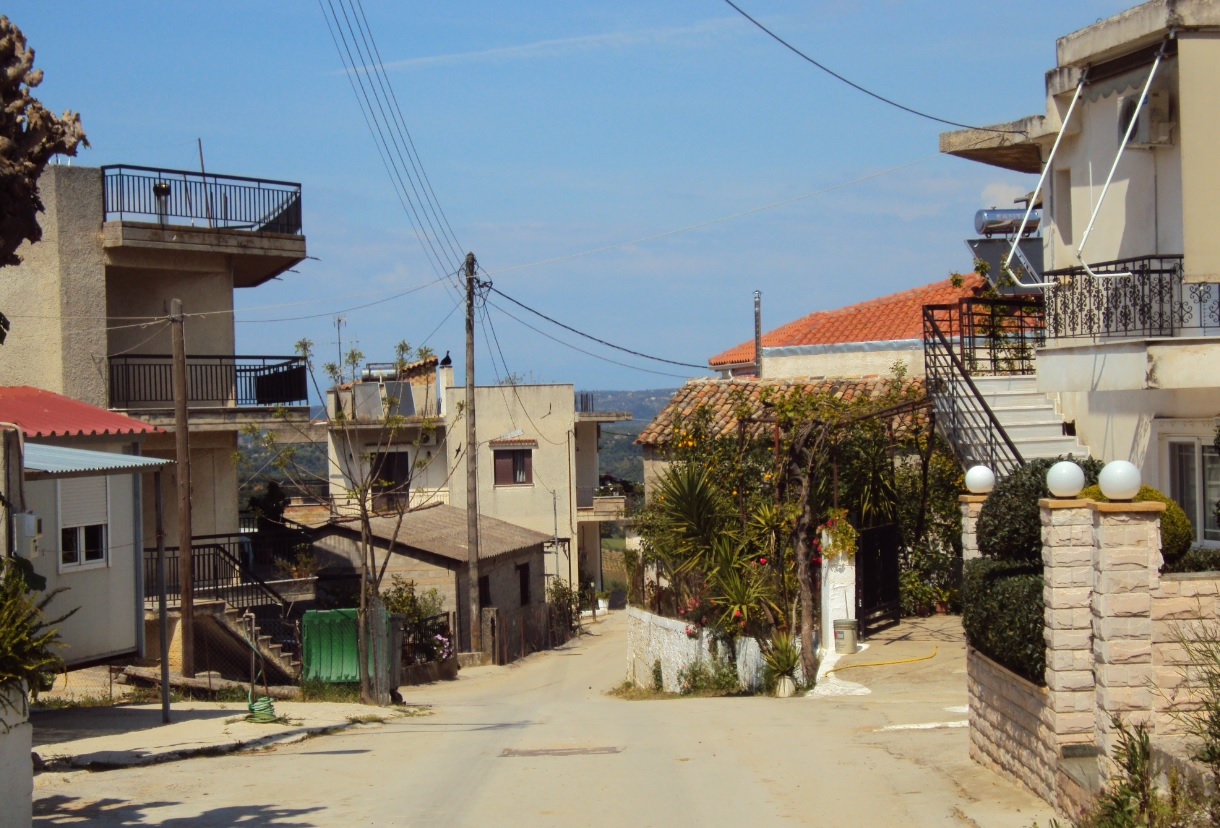

- Location within Greece
- Coordinates: 38°4′N 21°35′E
- Country: Greece
- Administrative region: West Greece
- Regional unit: Achaea
- Municipality: West Achaea
- Municipal unit: Olenia
- Elevation: 90 m (300 ft)

Population (2021)
  - Community: 183
- Time zone: UTC+2 (EET)
  - Summer (DST): UTC+3 (EEST)
- Postal code: 252 00
- Area code: 26240
- Vehicle registration: AX/AZ

Fostaina (Greek: Φώσταινα) is a village in the municipal unit of Olenia, Achaea, Greece. It is located in low hills, 3 km south of Lousika and 8 km southeast of Kato Achaia.

== Population ==
Year	Population
1981	253
1991	259
2001	309
2011	219
2021	183

== See also ==
- List of settlements in Achaea
