= Agios Stefanos, Achaea =

Agios Stefanos Άγιος Στέφανος
- Community
- Location within Greece
- Coordinates: 38°6′N 21°38′E
- Country: Greece
- Administrative region: West Greece
- Regional unit: Achaea
- Municipality: West Achaea
- Municipal unit: Olenia
- Elevation: 81 m (266 ft)

Population (2021)
  - Community: 813
- Time zone: UTC+2 (EET)
  - Summer (DST): UTC+3 (EEST)
- Postal code: 252 00
- Area code: 26240
- Vehicle registration: AX

Agios Stefanos (Greek: Άγιος Στέφανος meaning Saint Stephen) is a village and a community in the municipality West Achaea, Greece. It is located on both sides of the river Tytheus, 17 km southwest of Patras. The community includes the villages Palaia Peristera and Fylakes. Agios Stefanos is part of the municipal unit of Olenia.

== Population ==
Historical population
Year	Pop.	±%
2001	945	—
2011	901	−4.7%
2021	813	−9.8%

== See also ==
- List of settlements in Achaea
