= Dimitrios Indares =

Member of the Filiki Eteria

- Native name: Δημήτριος Ινδαρές
- Born: around 1777; Leivartzi
- Allegiance: (Greece) First Hellenic Republic

Dimitrios or Dimitrakis Indares (Greek: Δημήτριος Ινδαρές/Δημητράκης Ινταρές) was a fighter of the Greek War of Independence.

== Biography ==
Indares was born in Leivartzi, a village in Achaea, around 1777, to family expatriated from Mystras. His family name was Papadopoulos, but he was nicknamed 'Indares' from the Turkish idare (= administration, direction, management), Indares (= commander, chief of a military corps). Until the final adoption of this surname, he signed as Spiliopoulos ('son of Spilios').

As a young man he went to Zakynthos, where he joined the British Army for a short time. There he was initiated into the Filiki Eteria and then undertook the initiation of the 33 villages of the Leivarzi-Kapeli area. On March 16, 1821, he organized the attack against the Turks of Mostenitsa and set fire to the tower of the Muslim Albanian landowner from Lalas, Elmaz Agha, where he found plenty of ammunition, part of which he contributed to the siege of the towers of Kalavryta. This fact is probably the first attack at the beginning of the revolution against an inhabited settlement, since the attack to the city of Kalavryta and Kalamata took place later.

The attack on Elmaz Agha's tower was in part motivated by revenge against Elmaz for having abducted his cousin Eleni, daughter of the local magnate Christodoulos Papadopoulos. The romance between the Muslim Elmaz Agha and the Christian Eleni around the year 1800, was a major local event and became a legend, which survived as a folk song with various variations.

At the battle of Pyrgos, on April 3, 1821, as the leader of a group from Kalavryta he hurried to strengthen the defense of the rebels under Charalambos Vilaetis against the attack of the numerous Albanians of Lala.

While the Lalaians had already entered the city looting and destroying, and the body-to-body conflict was now raging in the area of Agios Charalambos (Kanoulia), the arrival of the Kalavryta rebels took the Turks by surprise. Attacked in their rear, they were forced to withdraw.

Indares offered great services in the battle of Lalas, at Pousi, where, among other things, he provided the tools used by the Greek rebels to entrench themselves. He showed great zeal as he went alone from outpost to outpost, expecting a night attack from the Turks.

He fought in the battle of Agios Vlasis (July 1827), as the leader of a contingent from his home area and contributed to the effort of Theodoros Kolokotronis, to recover the villages of Achaea that had submitted to the Ottomans. Some 1,100 Greeks, led by Vassilios Petimezas, Dagres from Argos and Indares, were attacked by 6,000 Turks under Deli Ahmed and 2,000 turncoat Greeks under D. Nenekos. Indares was seriously injured.

His activity is also mentioned in other military operations: in Patras, Akrata, Alonistaina, Piana, Chrepa, Kremasti (Monemvasia), Gerakovouni.

In 1825 the Provisional Administration of Greece promoted him to chiliarch. After the end of the war, he became an officer of the Royal Phalanx, with his final promotion on August 27, 1845, to the rank of Captain of the Phalanx (equivalent to Colonel).

He is registered in the Archive of the Struggle Committee (EBE) as Spiliopoulos / Indares, with several reports on his activities and important signatures.

In a memorandum that Indares submitted to King Otto of Greece in 1844, he includes a brief account of his participation in the war but also of his subsequent activity in the community of the wider area of Kalavryta. The memorandum is in the General Archives of the State.

His grandson was Lambros Indares.

== Sources ==
- Fotios Chrysanthopoulos-Fotakos, Βίοι Πελοποννησίων ανδρών και των εξώθεν εις την Πελοπόννησον ελθόντων κληρικών, στρατιωτικών και πολιτικών των αγωνισαμένων τον αγώνα της επαναστάσεως, 1888. Retrieved April 10, 2010
- Konstantinos D. Bitas, Ανέκδοτον υπόμνημα του αγωνιστού Δημητράκη Σπήλιου Ινταρέ. Επετηρίς Καλαβρύτων, vol. 8, 1976
- Pericles P. Doudoumis, Ιστορία της κωμοπόλεως Λειβαρζίου των Καλαβρύτων, Αθήνα, 1941
- Athanasios Theod. Lelos, Ιστορία αρχαίας Ψωφίδος και Λειβαρζίου, Αθήνα, 1953
- George Arist. Chrysanthakopoulos, Η Ηλεία επί Τουρκοκρατίας, Αθήνα, 1950
