= Zviad Izoria =

Georgian-American chess grandmaster (born 1984)

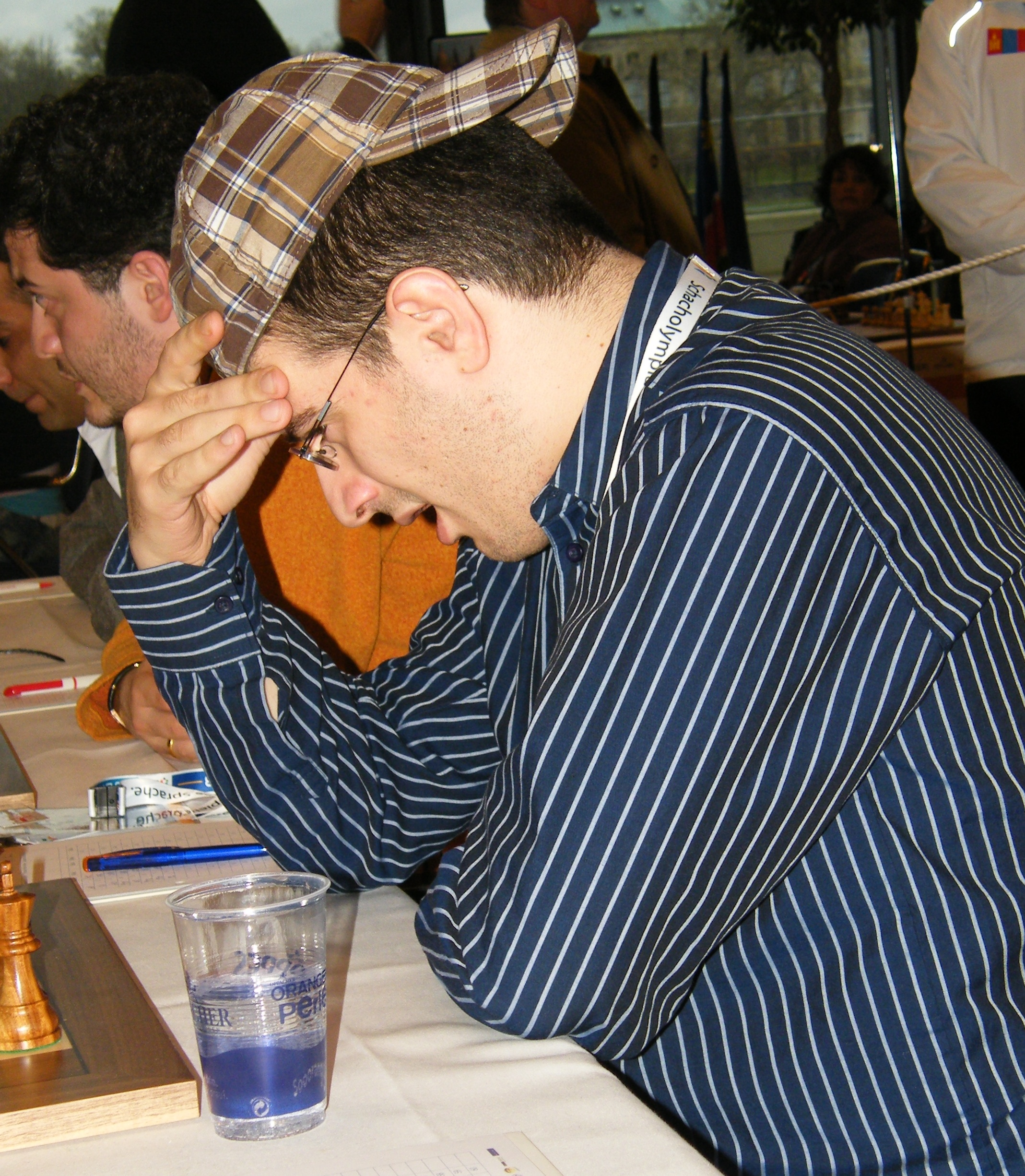
- Izoria in 2008

Personal information
- Born: 6 January 1984 (age 42) Khoni, Georgian SSR, Soviet Union

Chess career
- Country: Georgia (until 2013); United States (from 2013)
- Title: Grandmaster (2002)
- FIDE rating: 2602 (October 2026)
- Peak rating: 2660 (July 2006)
- Peak ranking: No. 48 (October 2006)

Zviad Izoria (Georgian: ზვიად იზორია; born 6 January 1984) is a Georgian chess grandmaster playing for the United States. Zviad is a winner of HB Global Chess Challenge and a $50,000 in prize money. He played on the Georgian team at 2002, 2004, and 2008 chess olympiad. Zviad was a 2005 World Cup participant and 2007 World Cup qualifier.

== Selected tournament victories ==
- 2000: Victory at the World Youth Chess Championship for U16.
- 2000: Winner of the Moscow Kasparov Cup.
- 2001: Victory at the European Youth Chess Championship for U18. Victory at the European Junior Chess Championship for U20.
- 2002: Victory at the European Junior Chess Championship for U20.
- 2005: Winner of the HB Global Chess Challenge 2005, and a prize of $50,000 (USD), along with a valuable jeweled watch.
- 2018: Victory over Fabiano Caruana (2018 World Championship Challenger) and Hikaru Nakamura at the US Chess Championship.
- 2020: First place in the 29th annual North American Open along with Hovhannes Gabuzyan.
