= Nikolaos Kontopoulos =

Greek writer

Nikolaos Kontopoulos Νικόλαος Κοντόπουλος
- Born: 1889; Lousika, Greece
- Died: 1958 (aged 68–69); Athens, Greece
- Occupation: Writer

Nikolaos Kontopoulos (Greek: Νικόλαος Κοντόπουλος, 1889–1958) was a Greek writer.

He was born in the village of Lousika in Achaea, Greece. He studied in Athens and later studied as a student and as a professor at the polytechnical school. He wrote many books.
