= Ano Achaia =

Ano Achaia Άνω Αχαΐα
- Community
- Location within Greece
- Coordinates: 38°6′N 21°34′E
- Country: Greece
- Administrative region: West Greece
- Regional unit: Achaea
- Municipality: West Achaea
- Municipal unit: Dymi

Population (2021)
  - Community: 170
- Time zone: UTC+2 (EET)
  - Summer (DST): UTC+3 (EEST)

Ano Achaia (Greek: Άνω Αχαΐα meaning Upper Achaea) is a village in the municipality of West Achaea, Greece. It is located 4 km south of Kato Achaia and 2 km west of Lousika.

== Population ==
Year	Population
1981	248
1991	233
2001	238
2011	229
2021	170

== See also ==
- List of settlements in Achaea
