= Larissos =

Larissos Λαρίσσος
- Municipal unit
- Location within the regional unit

- Location within Greece
- Coordinates: 38°6′N 21°25′E
- Country: Greece
- Administrative region: West Greece
- Regional unit: Achaea
- Municipality: West Achaea

Area
  - Municipal unit: 225.73 km^{2} (87.15 sq mi)
- Elevation: 98 m (322 ft)

Population (2021)
  - Municipal unit: 4,813
  - Municipal unit density: 21.32/km^{2} (55.22/sq mi)
- Time zone: UTC+2 (EET)
  - Summer (DST): UTC+3 (EEST)
- Postal code: 270 52
- Area code: 26930
- Vehicle registration: ΑΧ
- Website: www.larissos.gov.gr

Larissos (Greek: Λαρίσσος) is a former municipality in Achaea, West Greece, Greece. Since the local government reform in 2011, it a unit within the municipality West Achaea. The municipal unit has an area of 225.729 km^{2}. Its seat of administration was in the village Lappas, part of the community Metochi. The municipal unit was named after the river Larissos, which flows through it. It is the westernmost municipal unit of Achaea, stretching along the Ionian Sea coast and the border with Elis to the southern part of the Movri hills. It is about 32 km southwest of Patras and 50 km north of Pyrgos.

The area is mostly flat, except the Movri hills in the southeast and the lower Mavra Vouna hills in the northwest, near Cape Araxos. Araxos Airport (GPA).

== Subdivisions ==
The municipal unit Larissos is subdivided into the following communities (constituent villages in brackets):

- Agios Nikolaos Spaton (Agios Nikolaos, Agios Konstantinos)
- Apideonas
- Araxos (Araxos, Kalogria, Paralimni)
- Kagkadi
- Lakkopetra (Lakkopetra, Ioniki Akti, Karnari, Limanaki)
- Mataragka (Mataragka, Kafalaiika)
- Metochi (Metochi, Lappas, Neo Vouprasio, Vouprasio)
- Michoi (Michoi, Kandalos, Tsamaiika, Psefteika)
- Petas
- Riolos (Riolos, Mazaiika)
- Velitses (Ano Velitses, Kato Velitses)

== Population history ==
Year	Population
1991	7,414
2001	8,858
2011	5,650
2021	4,813

== Football (soccer) clubs ==
- Akadimos Larissou
- Atromitos Lappa, a football (soccer) club currently playing in the Fourth Division
- Ikaros Lakkopetra
- Metochi FC

== See also ==
- List of settlements in Achaea
