= Arla, Greece =

Arla Άρλα
- Community
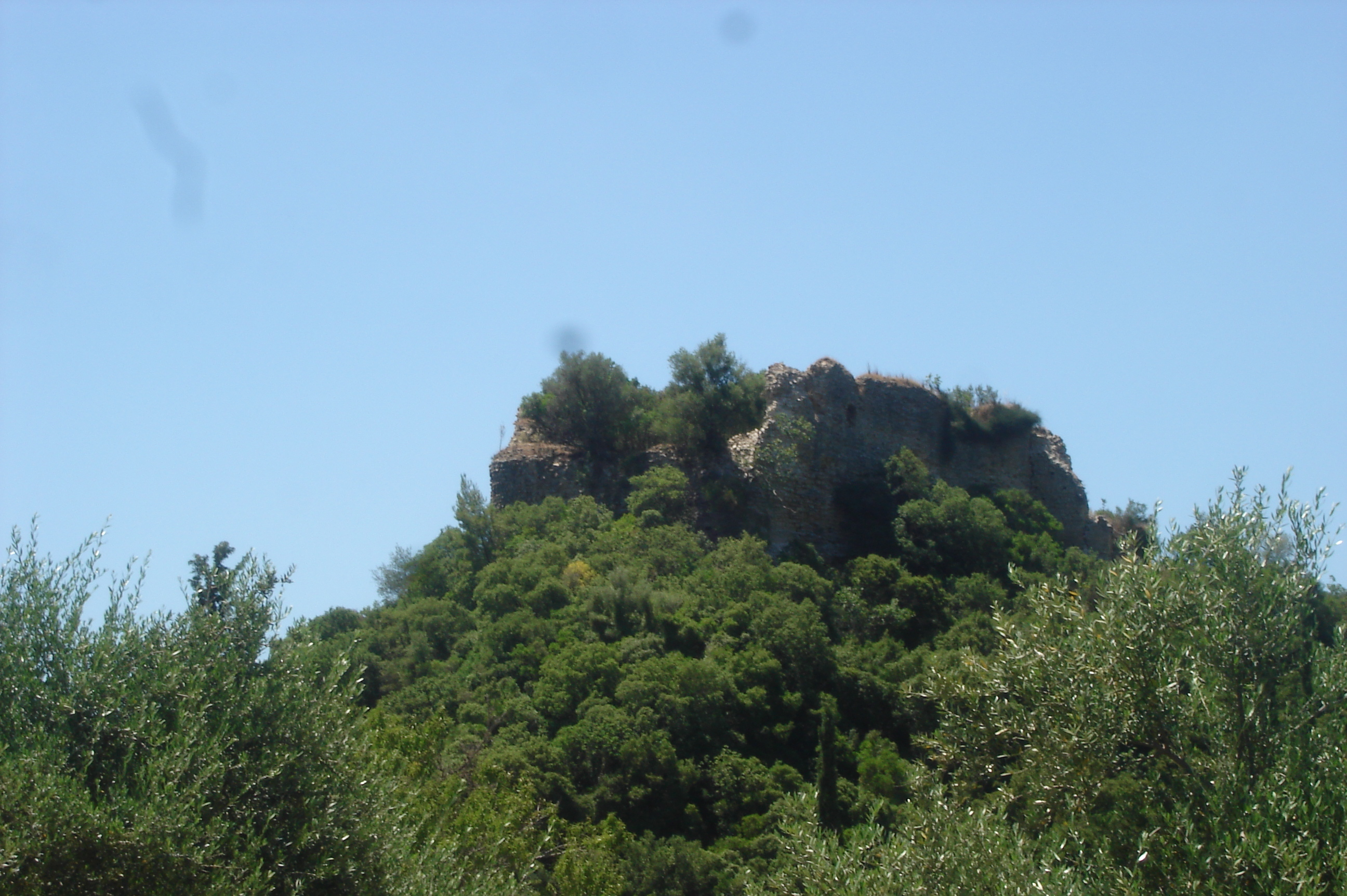
- Gyftokastro, Arla

- Location within Greece
- Coordinates: 38°3′N 21°36′E
- Country: Greece
- Administrative region: West Greece
- Regional unit: Achaea
- Municipality: West Achaea
- Municipal unit: Olenia
- Elevation: 190 m (620 ft)

Population (2021)
  - Community: 318
- Time zone: UTC+2 (EET)
  - Summer (DST): UTC+3 (EEST)
- Postal code: 252 00
- Area code: 26240
- Vehicle registration: AX

Arla (Greek: Άρλα) is a village in the municipal unit of Olenia, Achaea, Greece. It is located in a hilly area, 6 km south of Lousika and 25 km southwest of Patras.

== Population ==
Year	Population
1981	395
1991	350
2001	392
2011	335
2021	318

== See also ==
- List of settlements in Achaea
