= Rita Kas =

Hungarian and German chess player

Personal information
- Full name: Rita Kas-Fromm
- Born: 8 October 1956 (age 69)

Chess career
- Country: Hungary; Germany
- Title: Woman International Master (1984)
- Peak rating: 2260 (July 1990)

Rita Kas (born 8 October 1956), also known as Rita Kas-Fromm, is a Hungarian and German chess player who holds the FIDE title of Woman International Master (WIM, 1984).

== Biography ==
In 1977, in Novi Sad Kas shared first place in the European Junior Chess Championship, and also shared the first place in the International Women's Chess tournament in Nałęczów. In 1982, she shared second place in the International Women's Chess tournament in Piotrków Trybunalski. In 1984, Kas was awarded the FIDE Woman International Master (WIM) title.

Kas played for Hungary in the Women's Chess Olympiads:

- In 1978, at first reserve board in the 8th Chess Olympiad (women) in Buenos Aires (+2, =4, -0) and won team silver medal,
- In 1984, at first reserve board in the 26th Chess Olympiad (women) in Thessaloniki (+3, =2, -3).

In the middle of the 1980s, Kas married and moved to West Germany. In 1988, she won the Federal Republic of Germany Women's Chess Championship. From the late 1990s, she has rarely participated in chess tournaments.
