= Portes, Achaea =

Portes Πόρτες
- Community
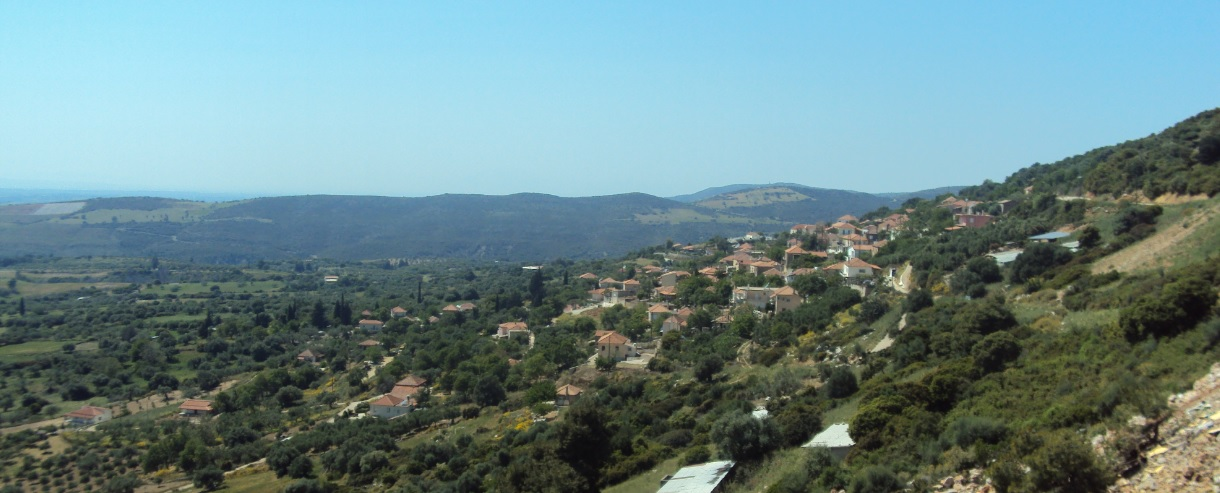
- Portes Achaias

- Location within Greece
- Coordinates: 37°56′N 21°34′E
- Country: Greece
- Administrative region: West Greece
- Regional unit: Achaea
- Municipality: West Achaea
- Municipal unit: Olenia

Population (2021)
  - Community: 169
- Time zone: UTC+2 (EET)
  - Summer (DST): UTC+3 (EEST)
- Vehicle registration: ΑΧ

Portes (Greek: Πόρτες meaning doors) is a village in the municipal unit of Olenia, Achaea, Greece. It is located on the southern end of Mount Skollis, 5 km south of Santomeri, 23 km south of Kato Achaia and 37 km southwest of Patras.

== Population ==
Year	Population
1981	476
1991	393
2001	397
2011	256
2021	169

== See also ==
- List of settlements in Achaea
