= Mataragka, Achaea =

Mataragka Ματαράγκα
- Community
- Location within Greece
- Coordinates: 38°01′N 21°28′E
- Country: Greece
- Administrative region: West Greece
- Regional unit: Achaea
- Municipality: West Achaea
- Municipal unit: Larissos

Population (2021)
  - Community: 259
- Time zone: UTC+2 (EET)
  - Summer (DST): UTC+3 (EEST)

Mataragka (Greek: Ματαράγκα, also Mataranga) is a Greek village and a community in the municipal unit of Larissos, Achaea, Greece. It is located on the western edge of the Movri hills, 4 km south of Riolos, 5 km east of Neapoli and 34 km southwest of Patras. The community includes the village Kefalaiika. Until 1974, Mataragka was part of the Elis Prefecture.

== Population ==
| Year | Village population | Community population |
|---|---|---|
| 1981 | 366 | - |
| 1991 | 166 | - |
| 2001 | 363 | 692 |
| 2011 | 117 | 282 |
| 2021 | 99 | 259 |

== See also ==
- List of settlements in Achaea
