= Santomeri =

Santomeri Σαντομέρι
- Community
- Location within Greece
- Coordinates: 37°59′N 21°34′E
- Country: Greece
- Administrative region: West Greece
- Regional unit: Achaea
- Municipality: West Achaea
- Municipal unit: Olenia

Population (2021)
  - Community: 223
- Time zone: UTC+2 (EET)
  - Summer (DST): UTC+3 (EEST)
- Vehicle registration: AX

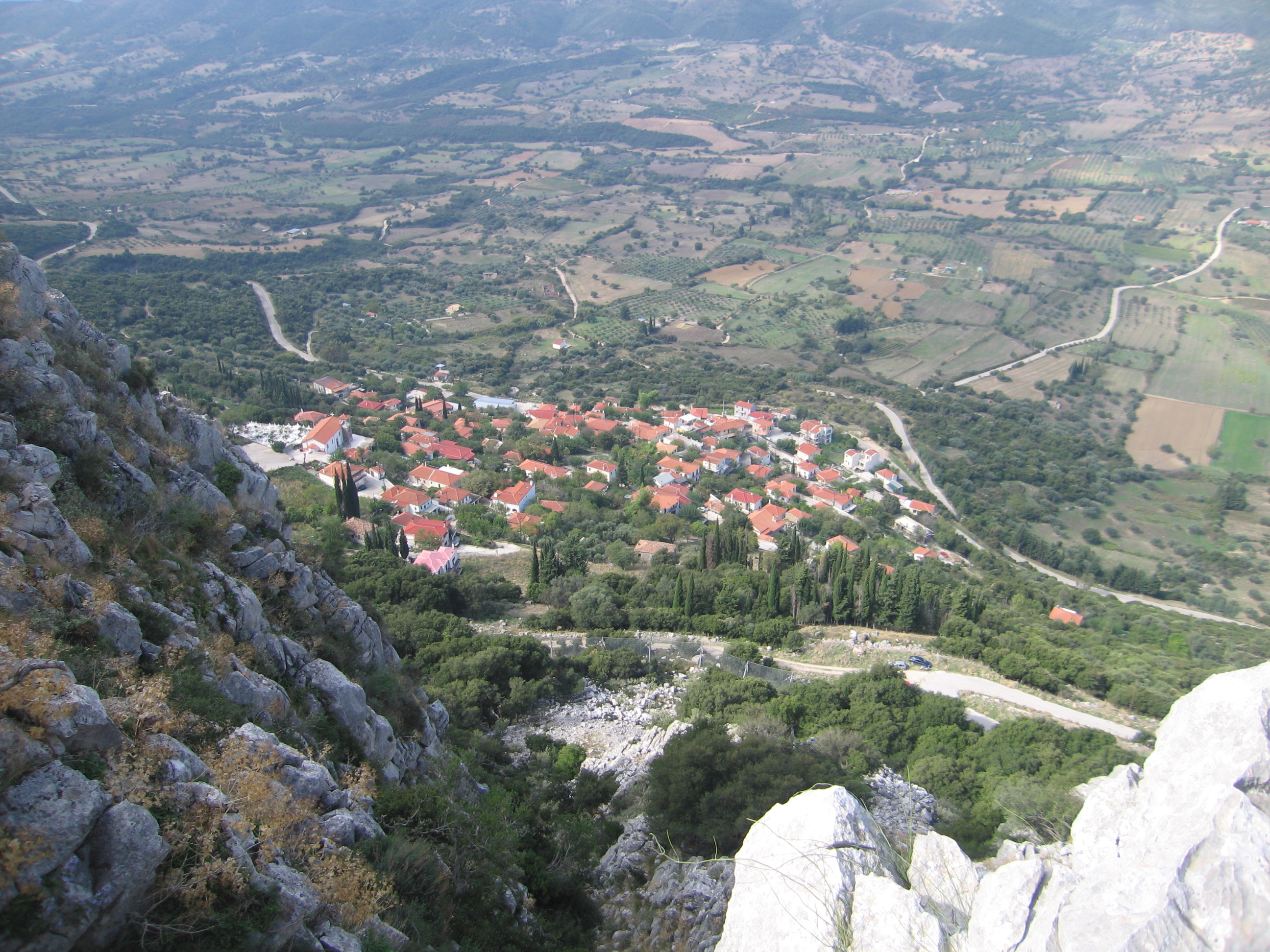

Santomeri (Greek: Σαντομέρι) is a village and a community in the municipal unit of Olenia, Achaea, Greece. It is located on the northern end of Mount Skollis, 5 km north of Portes, 18 km south of Kato Achaia and 32 km southwest of Patras. The community includes the villages Ampelakia and Polylofo.

== Population ==
| Year | Population | Community population |
|---|---|---|
| 1981 | 560 | - |
| 1991 | 291 | - |
| 2001 | 306 | 477 |
| 2011 | 164 | 314 |
| 2021 | 136 | 223 |

== History ==
Santomeri is named after Nicholas III of Saint Omer, a French baron of Thebes who gave his name to the castle Santameri and the nearby mountain, now known as Skollis. Venetians called it Edrolcamo?.

== See also ==
- List of settlements in Achaea
