= Movri (municipality) =

Movri Μόβρη
- Municipal unit
- Location within the regional unit

- Location within Greece
- Coordinates: 38°6′N 21°28′E
- Country: Greece
- Administrative region: West Greece
- Regional unit: Achaea
- Municipality: West Achaea

Area
  - Municipal unit: 86.48 km^{2} (33.39 sq mi)
- Elevation: 71 m (233 ft)

Population (2021)
  - Municipal unit: 5,044
  - Municipal unit density: 58.33/km^{2} (151.1/sq mi)
- Time zone: UTC+2 (EET)
  - Summer (DST): UTC+3 (EEST)
- Postal code: 250 05
- Area code: 26930
- Vehicle registration: ΑΧ

Movri (Greek: Μόβρη) is a former municipality in Achaea, West Greece, Greece. Since the 2011 local government reform, it is part of the municipality of West Achaea, of which it is a municipal unit. It has a population of 5,044 as of 2021, and is named after the mountain range Movri. The seat of the municipality is in Sageika. Its area is 86.484 km².

== Subdivisions ==
The municipal unit Movri is subdivided into the following communities (constituent villages in brackets):

- Fragka (Fragka, Spaneika, Tsakonika)
- Kareika (Kareika, Gomosto, Karamesineika, Rachi)
- Krinos
- Limnochori (Limnochori, Kalamaki, Kato Limnochori, Paralia Kalamakiou)
- Myrtos (Myrtos, Giouleika, Pournari)
- Sageika (Sageika, Apostoli, Bouteika, Gerouseika, Vrachneika, Stathmos)
