= 1150 Achaia =

Main-belt asteroid

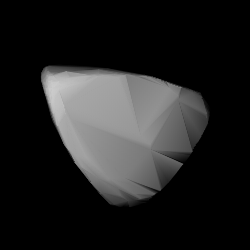
- Shape model of Achaia from its lightcurve

Discovery
- Discovered by: K. Reinmuth
- Discovery site: Heidelberg Obs.
- Discovery date: 2 September 1929

Designations
- Pronunciation: /əˈkaɪə/, /əˈkeɪə/
- Named after: Achaea (Greek region)
- Alternative designations: 1929 RB · 1955 SZ_{1}
- Minor planet category: main-belt · (inner); background

Orbital characteristics
- Epoch 16 February 2017 (JD 2457800.5)
- Uncertainty parameter 0
- Observation arc: 86.78 yr (31,696 days)
- Aphelion: 2.6392 AU
- Perihelion: 1.7424 AU
- Semi-major axis: 2.1908 AU
- Eccentricity: 0.2047
- Orbital period (sidereal): 3.24 yr (1,184 days)
- Mean anomaly: 348.01°
- Mean motion: 0° 18^{m} 14.04^{s} / day
- Inclination: 2.3929°
- Longitude of ascending node: 206.54°
- Argument of perihelion: 139.58°
- Earth MOID: 0.7366 AU

Physical characteristics
- Mean diameter: 7.689±0.020 km 7.82 km (calculated); 7.928±0.036 km 7.96±0.25 km 8.16±0.25 km
- Synodic rotation period: 60.99±0.05 h (Note: Pravec (2007) web: rotation period 60.99±0.05 hours with a brightness amplitude of 0.72 mag. Quality code of 3. Summary figures at Collaborative Asteroid Lightcurve Link (CALL) for (1150) Achaia and Pravec, P.; Wolf, M.; Sarounova, L. (2007))
- Pole ecliptic latitude: (5.0°, −65.0°) (λ_{1}/β_{1}); (20.0°, −69.0°) (λ_{2}/β_{2})
- Geometric albedo: 0.2343±0.0479; 0.239±0.017; 0.24 (assumed); 0.242±0.029; 0.251±0.017
- Spectral type: S (S3OS2-TH); Sl (S3OS2-BB)
- Absolute magnitude (H): 12.60 · 12.7

1150 Achaia (/əˈkaɪə/); prov. designation: 1929 RB) is a stony background asteroid from the inner regions of the asteroid belt. It was discovered by Karl Reinmuth at Heidelberg Observatory on 2 September 1929. The S-type asteroid has a notably long rotation period of hours 61 hours and measures approximately 7.8 kilometers (4.8 miles) in diameter. It is named for the Greek region of Achaia.

== Discovery ==
Achaia was discovered on 2 September 1929, by German astronomer Karl Reinmuth at Heidelberg Observatory in southwest Germany. Ten nights later, it was independently discovered by Friedrich Schwassmann and Arno Wachmann at Bergedorf. The body's observation arc begins at Heidelberg, five days after its first and official discovery observation.

== Orbit and classification ==
Located in the orbital region of the Flora family, one of the largest, yet disputed families of the main-belt, Achaia is a non-family asteroid of the main belt's background population when applying the hierarchical clustering method to its proper orbital elements. It orbits the Sun at a distance of 1.7–2.6 AU once every 3 years and 3 months (1,184 days). Its orbit has an eccentricity of 0.20 and an inclination of 2° with respect to the ecliptic.

== Naming ==
This minor planet is named for the region Achaea (or "Achaia") in Western Greece. It is located in the northern part of the Peloponnese peninsula and borders on the gulfs of Patras and Corinth. Naming citation was first mentioned in The Names of the Minor Planets by Paul Herget in 1955 (H 107).

== Physical characteristics ==
In the Tholen-like taxonomy of the Small Solar System Objects Spectroscopic Survey (S3OS2), Achaia is a common, stony S-type asteroid, while in the survey's SMASS (Bus–Binzel)-like taxonomic variant, it is an Sl-subtype, which transitions from the S-type to the uncommon L-type asteroid.

=== Photometry ===
A rotational lightcurve of Achaia was obtained from photometric observations by Czech astronomer Petr Pravec at Ondřejov Observatory in October 2007. (Note: (1150) Achaia: Lightcurve Plot analysis on 23 October 2007 by Pravec and Galad. ProjectID: Modra, Kharkiv. Comment: Error of 0.02 h is formal, real error perhaps a couple times greater.) It gave a well-defined rotation period of 60.99 hours with a brightness variation of 0.72 magnitude (U=3).

Published in 2016, two additional lightcurves were derived from modeled photometric data using various sources. They gave a sidereal rotation period of 61.071±0.001 and 61.072±0.005 hours, as well as a spin axis of (5.0°, −65.0°) and (20.0°, −69.0°) in ecliptic coordinates, respectively.

While not being a slow rotator, Achaia has a notably longer period than the vast majority of asteroids, which typically rotate every 2 to 20 hours once around their axis. Also, the body's changes in brightness are relatively high and indicate that it has a non-spheroidal shape.

=== Diameter and albedo ===
According to the surveys carried out by the Japanese Akari satellite and NASA's Wide-field Infrared Survey Explorer with its subsequent NEOWISE mission, Achaia measures between 7.689 and 8.16 kilometers in diameter, and its surface has an albedo between 0.234 and 0.251. The Collaborative Asteroid Lightcurve Link assumes an albedo of 0.24 – taken from 8 Flora, the Flora family's principal body and namesake – and calculates a diameter of 7.82 kilometers based on an absolute magnitude of 12.7.
