= Achaeans =

Achaeans are the inhabitants of Achaea in Greece. However, the meaning of Achaea changed during the course of Ancient history, and thus Achaeans may refer to:

- Achaeans (Homer), a name used by Homer in the Iliad for Mycenaean-era Greeks in general
- Achaeans (tribe), one of the major tribes of Greece according to the Hesiodic foundation myth
- Achaea (ancient region)
- Achaea Phthiotis, a region of ancient Thessaly
- Achaean League
- Achaea, the modern Greek administrative unit

== See also ==
- Achaea (disambiguation)
- Achaean War
