= Oenomel =

Oenomel or Oenomeli, derived from the Greek words oinos (wine) and meli (honey), is an ancient Greek beverage consisting of honey and unfermented grape juice. It is sometimes used as a folk remedy for gout and certain nervous disorders.

Many drinks are prepared using honey. Mead is a fermented alcoholic beverage made of honey, water and yeast. Oxymel is made of honey, vinegar, sea salt, and rainwater. Hydromel is another name for mead. Rhodomel is a mixture of roses and honey. Omphacomel is made from the juice of unripe grapes mixed with honey. Oenomel comes from unfermented grape juice and honey. However, according to the Geoponica, oenomeli is prepared either by blending honey with wine and spices (such as costus) or by mixing honey with must.

Oenomel has the connotation of being a blend of strength and sweetness, which can mean something positive (as in a personality trait) or negative (as in a carrot-and-stick approach).

== See also ==
- Mulsum (drink)
- Ancient Greece and wine
