= Santameri Castle =

Castle in Achaea, Greece

Coordinates: 37.995°N 21.580°E

Santameri Castle (Greek: Σανταμέρι) is a castle on the mountain Skollis near the boundary of Achaea and Elis in southwestern Greece. It was one of the strongest castles, controlling the Elean fields and the mountain passes to Tritaia.

It was built in 1311 by the Frankish Nicholas of Saint-Omer, who gave his name to the castle. In Venetian records it was listed as Edrolcamo (Εντρόλκαμο). Saint-Omer was lord of Thebes.

Around the castle developed a large city, that had 1,500 houses at its peak. The Byzantines had tried many times to besiege the castle without succeeding. According to the Aragonese version of the Chronicle of the Morea, the Byzantines lost 1,500 men and 500 horses in a large battle between the Byzantines and Navarrese, that ruled the castle at the time.

It was handed over as dowry to the Despot of the Morea Constantine Palaeologus in 1429 along with Chlemoutsi castle, when he married Theodora Tocco, daughter of Leonardo II Tocco. Theodora died the following year during childbirth and was buried in Santameri. After many years, her remains were transferred to Mystras. The Ottomans captured the castle in 1460, and many of its inhabitants were killed or sold into slavery.

Today, the walls of the castle and ruins of many buildings and a Byzantine church remain. Outside the castle is the locality Patrini where the tomb of Theodora Tocco was located.

== Sources ==
- Andrews, Kevin A. (2006). Castles of the Morea. American School of Classical Studies at Athens. ISBN 978-0-87661-406-8.
- Bon, Antoine (1969). La Morée franque. Recherches historiques, topographiques et archéologiques sur la principauté d'Achaïe [The Frankish Morea. Historical, Topographic and Archaeological Studies on the Principality of Achaea] (in French). Paris: De Boccard. OCLC 869621129.
- Nikos E. Politis, Paradoseis (Παραδόσεις) Folklores, Grammata publishers
- Thomas Delvaux, Le sang des Saint-Omer des croisades à la quenouille en Artois, Flandre, Normandie, Angleterre et dans les Etats Latins d'Orient, Tatinghem, 2007
