= Olenia =

Municipal unit in West Achaea, Greece

Olenia Ωλενία
- Municipal unit
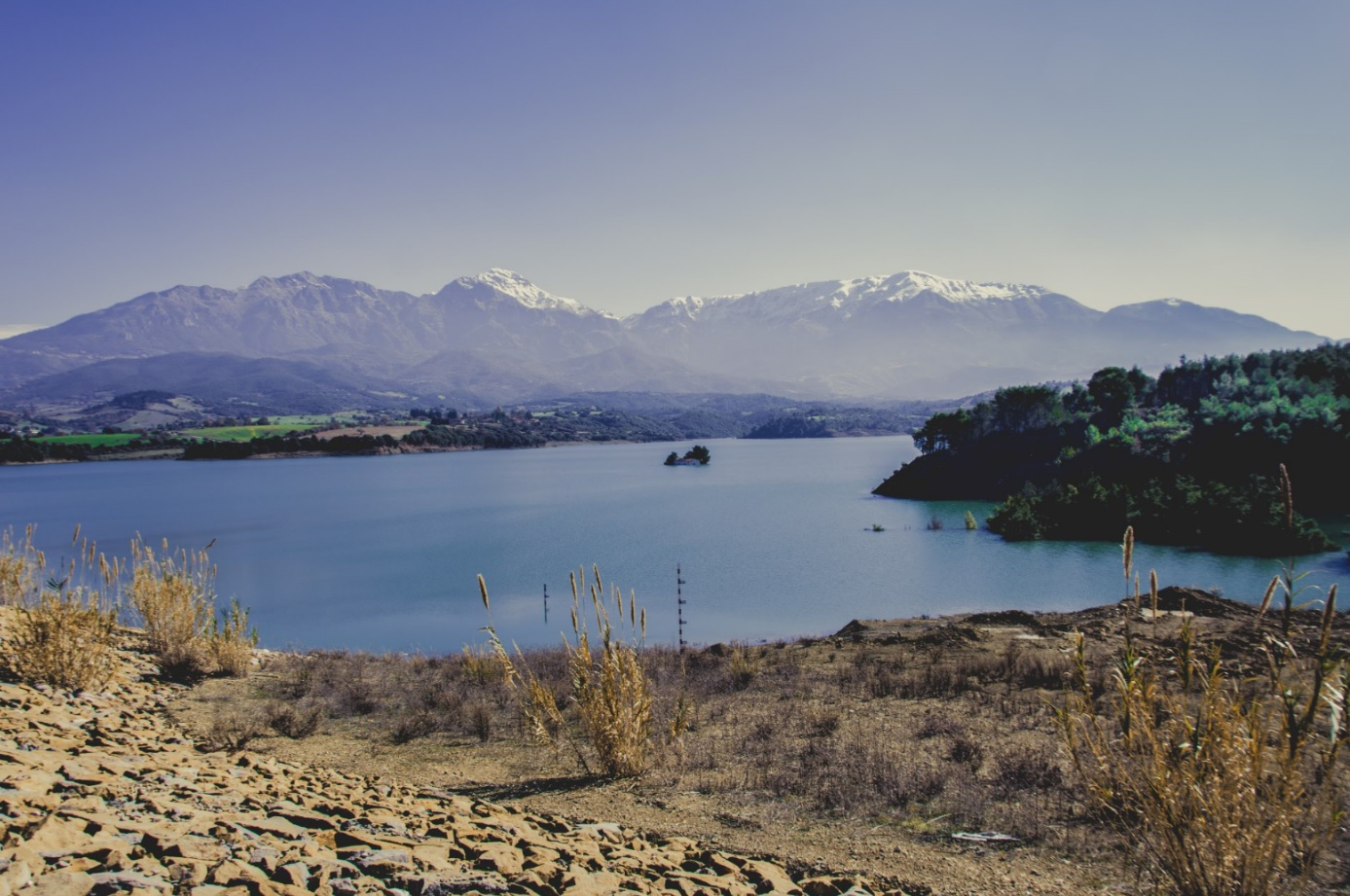
- View of the lake formed by Asteri Dam (also called Parapeiros Dam) on the Farres–Olenia boundary, with the temporary sinking islet bearing Saint Theodore's chapel of Mitopoli village in the foreground and Mount Erymanthos in the background.

- Location within the regional unit

- Location within Greece
- Coordinates: 38°6′N 21°35′E
- Country: Greece
- Geographic region: Peloponnese
- Administrative region: West Greece
- Regional unit: Achaea
- Municipality: West Achaea

Area
  - Municipal unit: 189.5 km^{2} (73.2 sq mi)
- Elevation: 163 m (535 ft)

Population (2021)
  - Municipal unit: 4,303
  - Municipal unit density: 22.71/km^{2} (58.81/sq mi)
- Time zone: UTC+2 (EET)
  - Summer (DST): UTC+3 (EEST)
- Vehicle registration: ΑΧ

Olenia (Greek: Ωλενία) is a municipal unit of the municipality of West Achaea in the Peloponnese peninsula of Greece. Until the 2011 local government reform, it was a separate municipality with the village of Lousika as its seat. It covers an area of 189.534 km^{2} and has a population of 4,303 according to the 2021 census. Olenia is named after the ancient Achaean town of Olenus.

== Subdivisions ==
The municipal unit Olenia is subdivided into the following communities (constituent villages in brackets):

- Achaiko
- Agios Nikolaos Kralis (Kalamaki, Agios Nikolaos, Avgeraiika, Thomaiika, Poimenochori)
- Agios Stefanos (Agios Stefanos, Palaia Peristera, Fylakes)
- Ano Soudenaiika
- Arla
- Chaikali (Chaikali, Katsaitaiika, Kounelaiika)
- Charavgi (Charavgi, Neochori, Pigadia)
- Flokas (Flokas, Zisimaiika)
- Fostaina
- Galanaiika
- Gkaneika
- Kato Mazaraki
- Lousika (Lousika, Spaliaraiika, Ypsili Rachi)
- Mitopoli (Mitopoli, Komi, Souvaliotaiika)
- Portes
- Santomeri (Santomeri, Ampelakia, Polylofo)
