= Lousika =

Village in Achaea, Greece

Lousika Λουσικά
- Community
- Location within Greece
- Coordinates: 38°6′N 21°36′E
- Country: Greece
- Administrative region: West Greece
- Regional unit: Achaea
- Municipality: West Achaea
- Municipal unit: Olenia
- Elevation: 65 m (213 ft)

Population (2021)
  - Community: 519
- Time zone: UTC+2 (EET)
  - Summer (DST): UTC+3 (EEST)
- Postal code: 252 00
- Area code: 26930
- Vehicle registration: ΑΧ

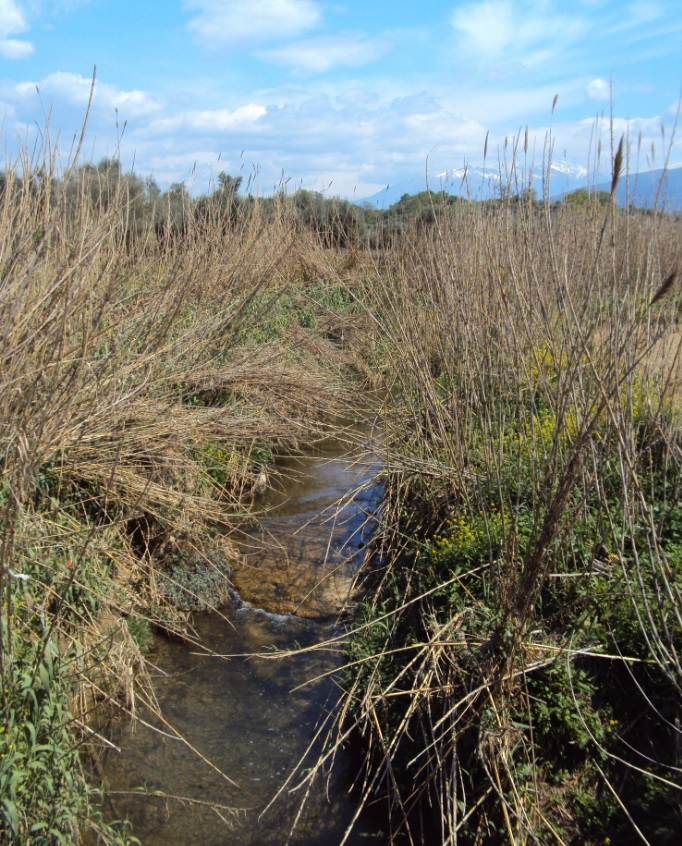
Serdini River near Lousika

Lousika (Greek: Λουσικά) is a village and a community in Achaea, Greece. It is located 5 km southeast of Kato Achaia, 3 km south of Alissos, and 20 km southwest of Patras. The community includes the villages Ypsili Rachi and Spaliaraiika. Lousika was the seat of the former municipality of Olenia. The river Serdini flows through the village.

== Population ==
Year	Village population	Community population
1981	-	894
1991	642	-
2001	604	793
2011	454	632
2021	378	519

== Notable people ==
- Stamatios Douvos, (1983-), writer, philosopher, historian
- Nikolaos Kontopoulos, (1889–1958 in Athens), writer

== See also ==
- List of settlements in Achaea
