= Metochi, Larissos =

Metochi Μετόχι
- Community
- Location within Greece
- Coordinates: 38°07′N 21°24′E
- Country: Greece
- Administrative region: West Greece
- Regional unit: Achaea
- Municipality: West Achaea
- Municipal unit: Larissos
- Elevation: 5 m (16 ft)

Population (2021)
  - Community: 1,435
- Time zone: UTC+2 (EET)
  - Summer (DST): UTC+3 (EEST)
- Postal code: 270 52
- Area code: 26930

Metochi (Greek: Μετόχι) is a village and a community in the municipal unit of Larissos, western Achaea, Greece. The community consists of the villages Metochi, Vouprasio, Neo Vouprasio and Lappas. Lappas was the seat of the former municipality of Larissos. Metochi is located in the plains near the Ionian Sea coast, 5 km south of Araxos, 3 km southwest of Araxos Airport, 14 km west of Kato Achaia and 32 km west of Patras. The Prokopos lagoon, which is fed by the river Larissos, is 1 km north of Metochi. Lappas is on the Greek National Road 9 (Patras - Pyrgos) and on the railway from Patras to Pyrgos.

== Historical population ==
Year	Village population	Community population
1981	-	1,723
1991	571	-
2001	644	2,110
2011	349	1,483
2021	383	1,435

== See also ==
- List of settlements in Achaea
