= Dymi, Achaea =

Dymi Δύμη
- Municipal unit
- Location within the regional unit

- Location within Greece
- Coordinates: 38°8′N 21°33′E
- Country: Greece
- Administrative region: West Greece
- Regional unit: Achaea
- Municipality: West Achaea

Area
  - Municipal unit: 71.55 km^{2} (27.63 sq mi)
- Elevation: 48 m (157 ft)

Population (2021)
  - Municipal unit: 11,473
  - Municipal unit density: 160.3/km^{2} (415.3/sq mi)
- Time zone: UTC+2 (EET)
  - Summer (DST): UTC+3 (EEST)
- Postal code: 252 00
- Area code: 26930
- Vehicle registration: ΑΧ
- Website: www.dymi.gr

Dymi (Greek: Δύμη) is a former municipality in Achaea, West Greece, Greece. Since the 2011 local government reform it is part of the municipality West Achaea, of which it is a municipal unit. The municipal unit has an area of 71.553 km^{2}. Its seat of administration was the town of Kato Achaia. It is located 20 km southwest of Patras.

== Population history ==
Year	Municipality Dymi
1991	8,765
2001	10,664
2011	10,227
2021	11,473

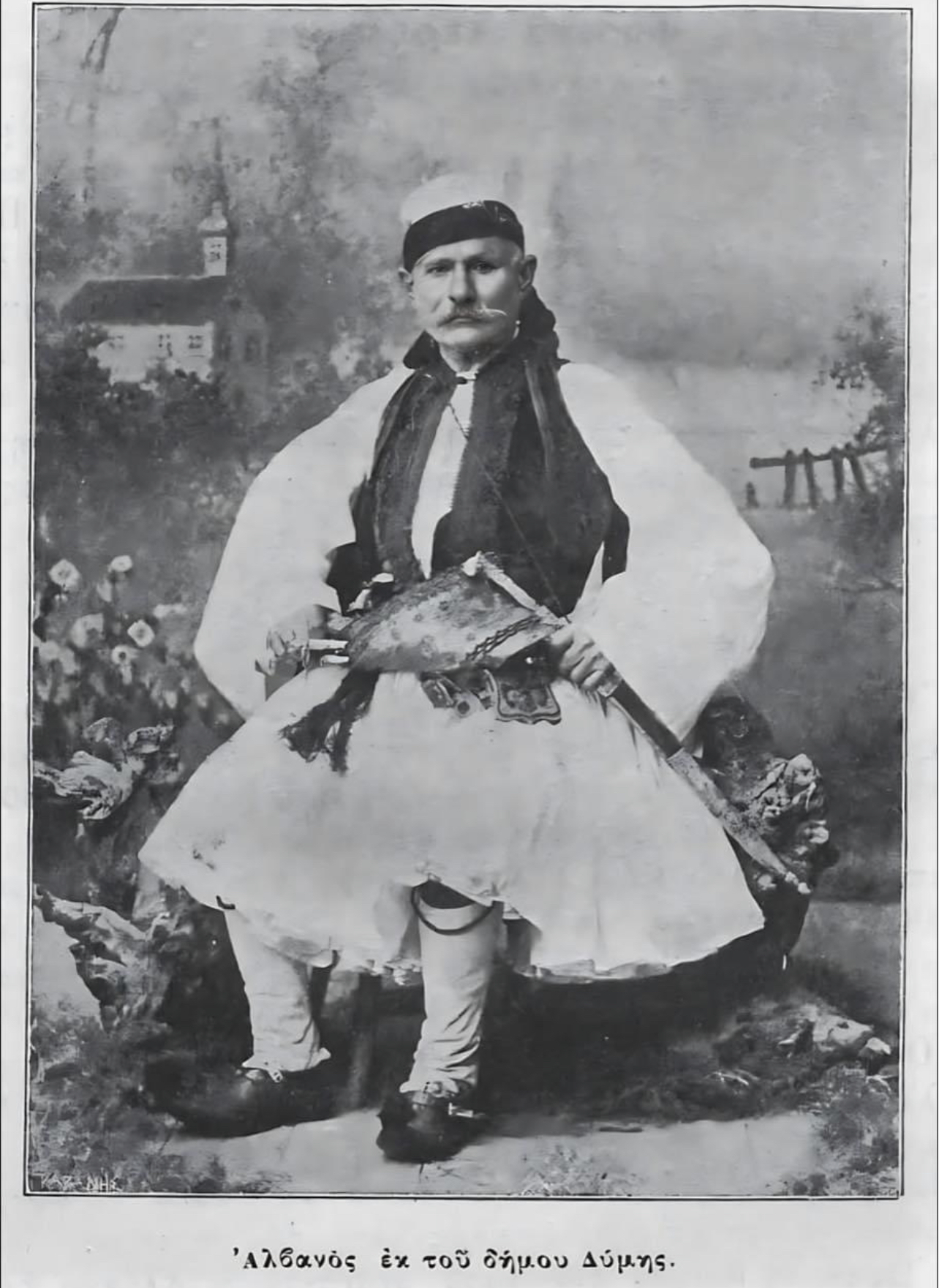
An Albanian from Dymi, Achaea

== Subdivisions ==
The municipal unit Dymi is subdivided into the following communities (constituent villages in brackets):

- Kato Achaia (Kato Achaia, Alykes, Manetaiikia, Paralia Kato Achaias, Piso Sykea)
- Agiovlasitika (Agiovlasitika, Kapeli, Lefkos, Stenaitika)
- Alissos (Alissos, Kamenitsa, Paralia Alissou, Profitis Elissaios)
- Ano Achaia
- Elaiochori
- Kato Alissos (Kato Alissos, Gialos)
- Niforeika (Niforeika, Paralia Niforeikon)
- Petrochori (Petrochori, Veskoukaiika, Vythoulkas, Zampeteika, Karya, Lampraiika, Logothetis)

== See also ==
- Dyme, ancient city
- List of settlements in Achaea
