= Skollis =

Mountain in West Achaea municipality, Greece

Coordinates: 37.968°N 21.577°E

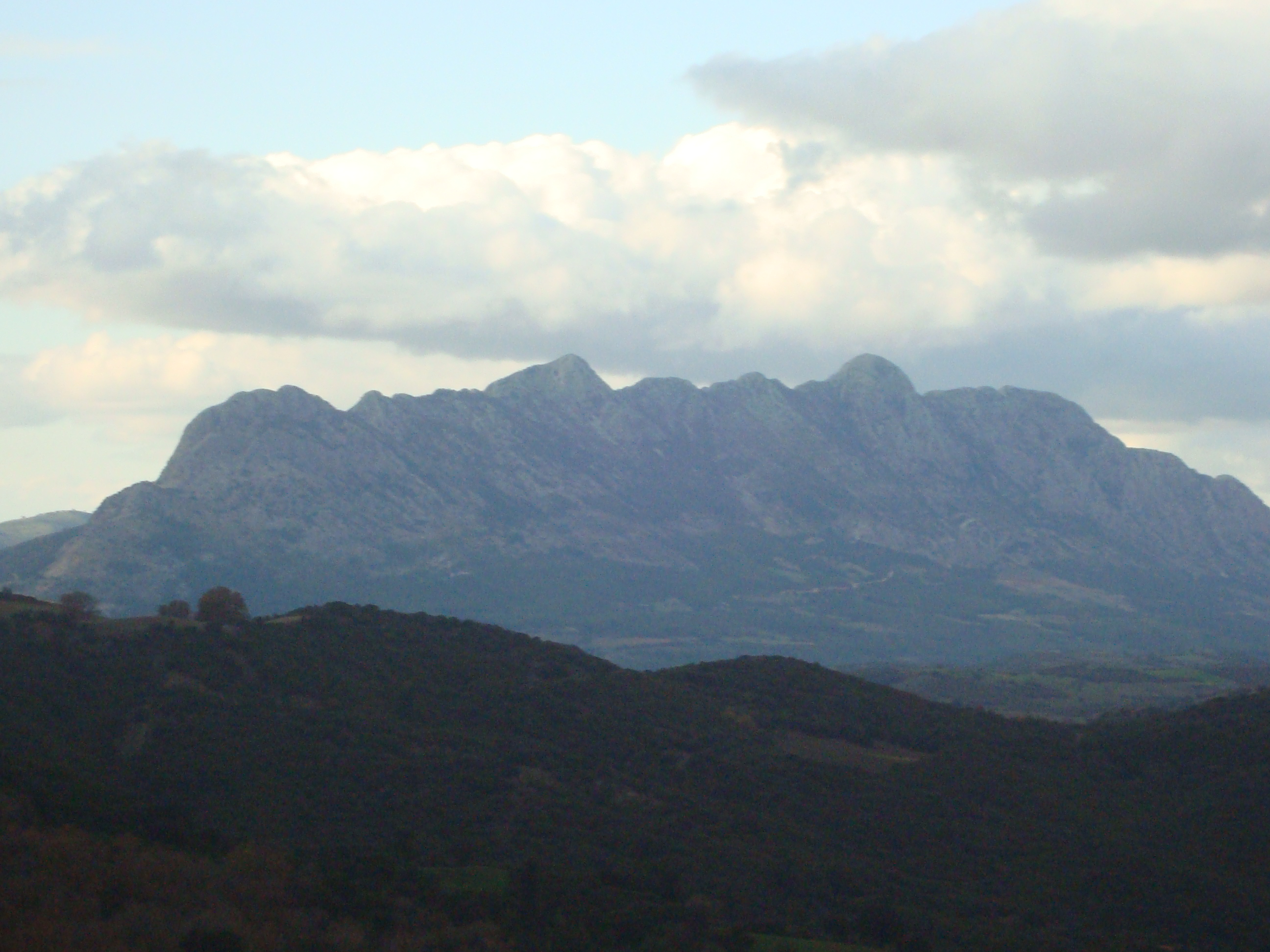
Santameri (Skollis) mountain

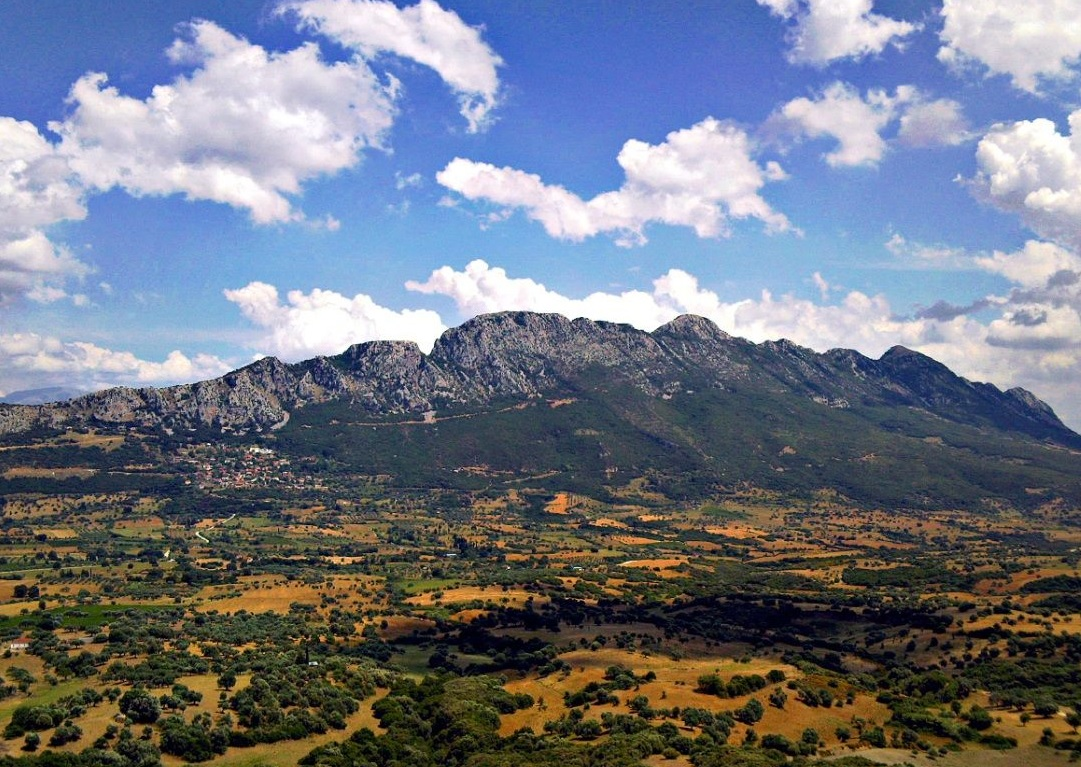
Mt. Skollis

Skollis (Greek: Σκόλλις), also known as Santameri, is a mountain in southwestern Achaea in the Peloponnese in western Greece. Its elevation is 1,016 metres (3,333 ft). It is situated between the villages Santomeri to the north and Portes to the south.
