= West Achaea =

Municipality in the Peloponnese, Greece

West Achaea Δυτική Αχαΐα
- Municipality
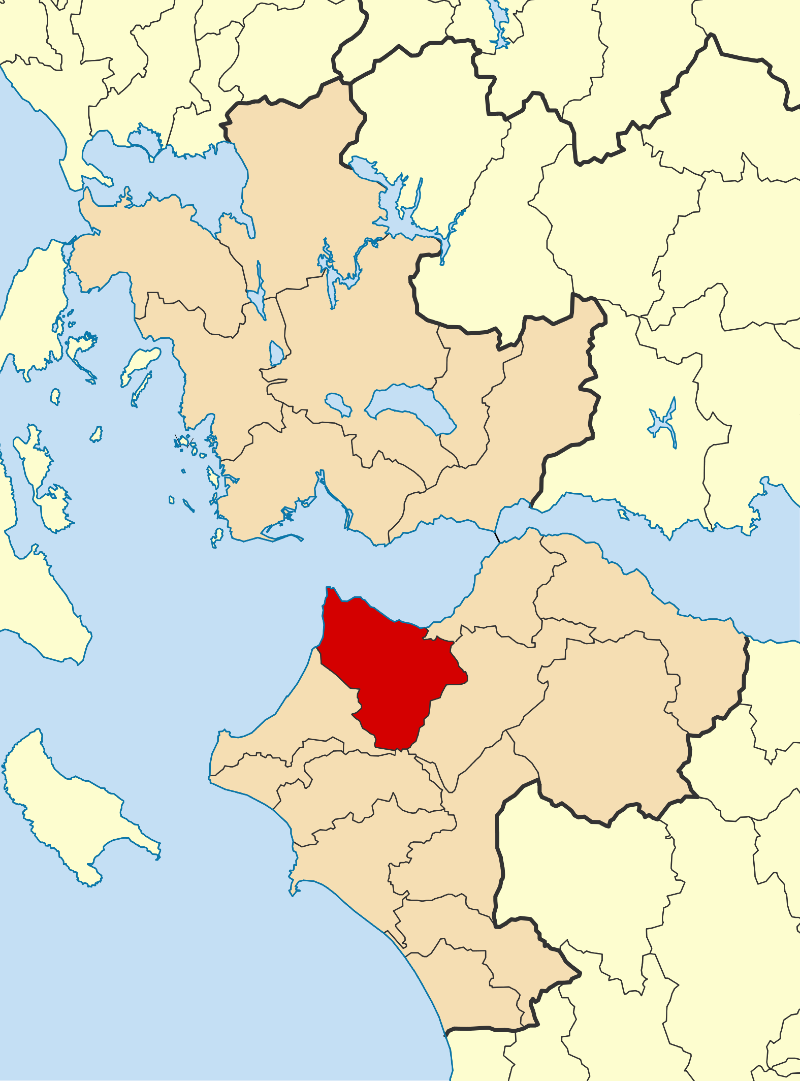

- Location within Greece
- Coordinates: 38°8′N 21°33′E
- Country: Greece
- Geographic region: Peloponnese
- Administrative region: West Greece
- Regional unit: Achaea

Area
  - Municipality: 573.3 km^{2} (221.4 sq mi)

Population (2021)
  - Municipality: 25,633
  - Density: 44.71/km^{2} (115.8/sq mi)
- Time zone: UTC+2 (EET)
  - Summer (DST): UTC+3 (EEST)

West Achaea (Greek: Δυτική Αχαΐα – Dytiki Achaia) is a municipal subdivision within greater Achaea – an ancient region of West Greece which forms part of the modern territory of larger Greece. The seat of the municipality is the town Kato Achaia. The municipality has an area of 573.30 km^{2}.

== Municipality ==
The municipality West Achaea was formed at the 2011 local government reform by the merger of the following 4 former municipalities, that became municipal units:

- Dymi
- Larissos
- Movri
- Olenia
