= Argyra (disambiguation) =

Argyra may refer to:

- Argyra, an insect genus
- A plant genus currently considered a synonym of Croton
- Argyra (mythology), a Greek nymph, one of the Naiads
- Argyra, Greece, a village in Achaea, Greece
- Argyra (Achaea), an ancient town of Achaea, Greece
- Argyra (Euboea), an ancient city of Euboea, Greece
- Argyra (Pontus), an ancient town of Pontus, now in Turkey
- Feminine form of Argyros
