= Burnum =

Roman ruins in Croatia

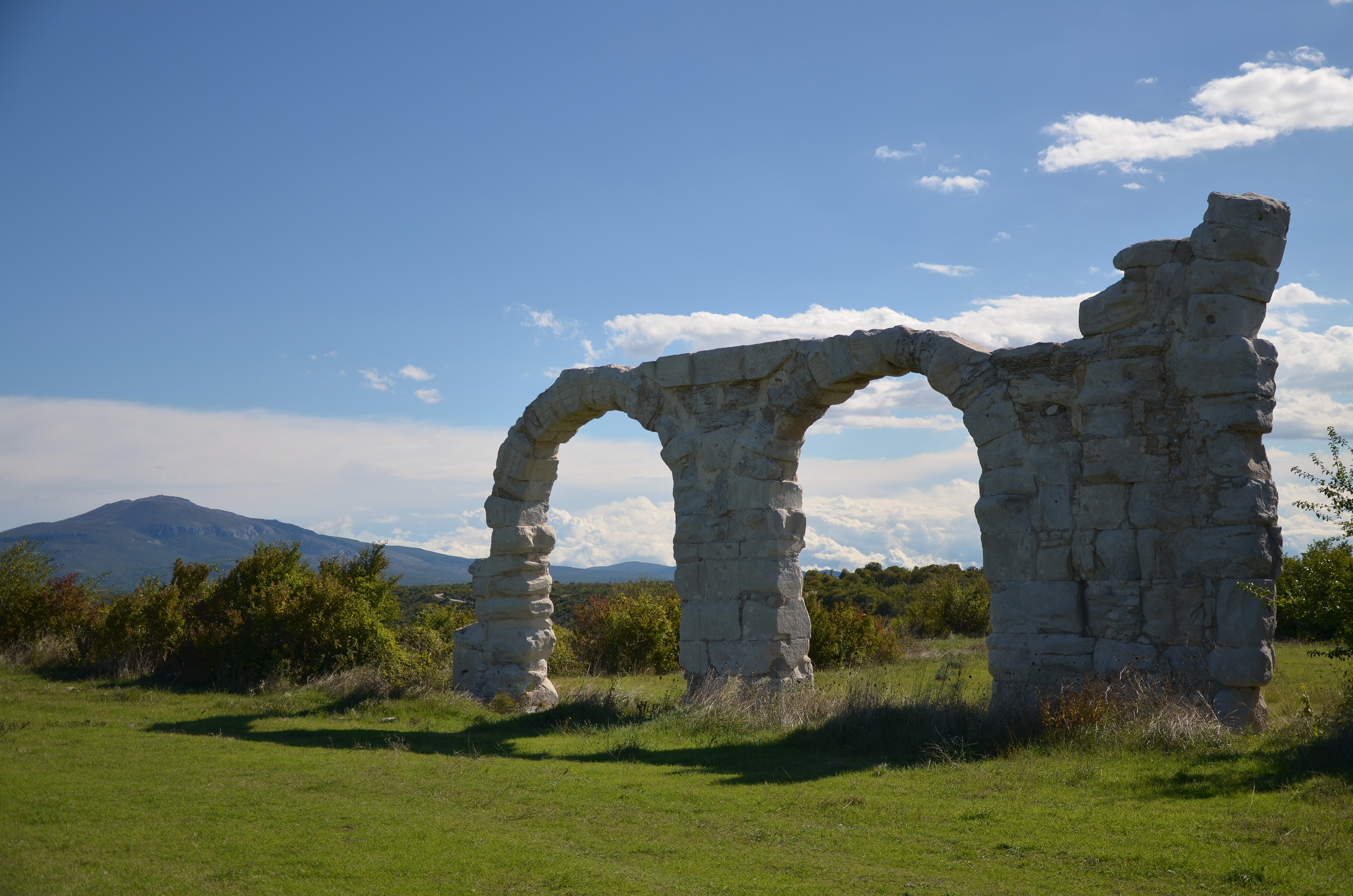
- The arches at Burnum, Croatia
- Interactive map of Burnum
- 44°1′5.16″N 16°1′32.88″E
- Type: Settlement
- Location: Šibenik-Knin County, Croatia
- Region: Dalmatia

Site notes
- Condition: In ruins

Burnum (/ˈbɜːrnəm/; or Burnum Municipium) was a Roman Legionary fortress, later converted to a town. It is located 2.5 km north of Kistanje, in inland Dalmatia, Croatia. The remains include a principia (principal building, or headquarters), the amphitheatre, and the aqueduct.

Burnum is also popularly called Hollow Church (Šuplja Crkva) and is one of many ruins in the Balkans identified in folklore as Traianus' Town (Trojanov Grad).

== History ==
The Roman writer Plinius wrote about Burnum as "fortress distinguished in wars." - "In hoc tractu sunt Burnum, Andetrium, Tribulium nobilitata proeliis castella." The Pagana chart from the 16th century presented marked traits of Burnum as the ancient locality, but it did not reach archeological interest until the 19th century, when it occupied the attention of renowned Croatian archaeologists, father Lujo Marun and father Frane Bulić. The first excavations were conducted by Austrian archaeologists.

Burnum dates from the middle of the reign of Augustus (27 BC-14 AD). Several Roman legions were located there in succession, and the first one was Legio XX Valeria Victrix from the beginning of the Great Illyrian Revolt in AD 6-9. The reason for its location was the need for the control of traffic around the Krka River. Building was initiated by the Roman governor for Dalmatia Publius Cornelius Dolabella and continued by the Emperor Claudius.

After Legio XX moved to Germania Inferior in 9 AD, Legio XI took its place. The fortress gained its final shape during the reign of Claudius around 50 AD. The legion left the camp around 68 AD and was succeeded by the new Legio IIII Flavia Felix in 70 AD.

According to some sources, a rebellion of Lucius Arruntius Camillus Scribonianus against the emperor Claudius in AD 42 was started at this camp as well. After the rebellion all of Burnum, including the legionary camp, experienced major urban and architectural changes.

After the last Roman legions had left the camp, it developed into an urban settlement.

The camp was completely destroyed when the emperor Justinian attempted to take it back from the Ostrogoths in the 6th century.

== Features ==
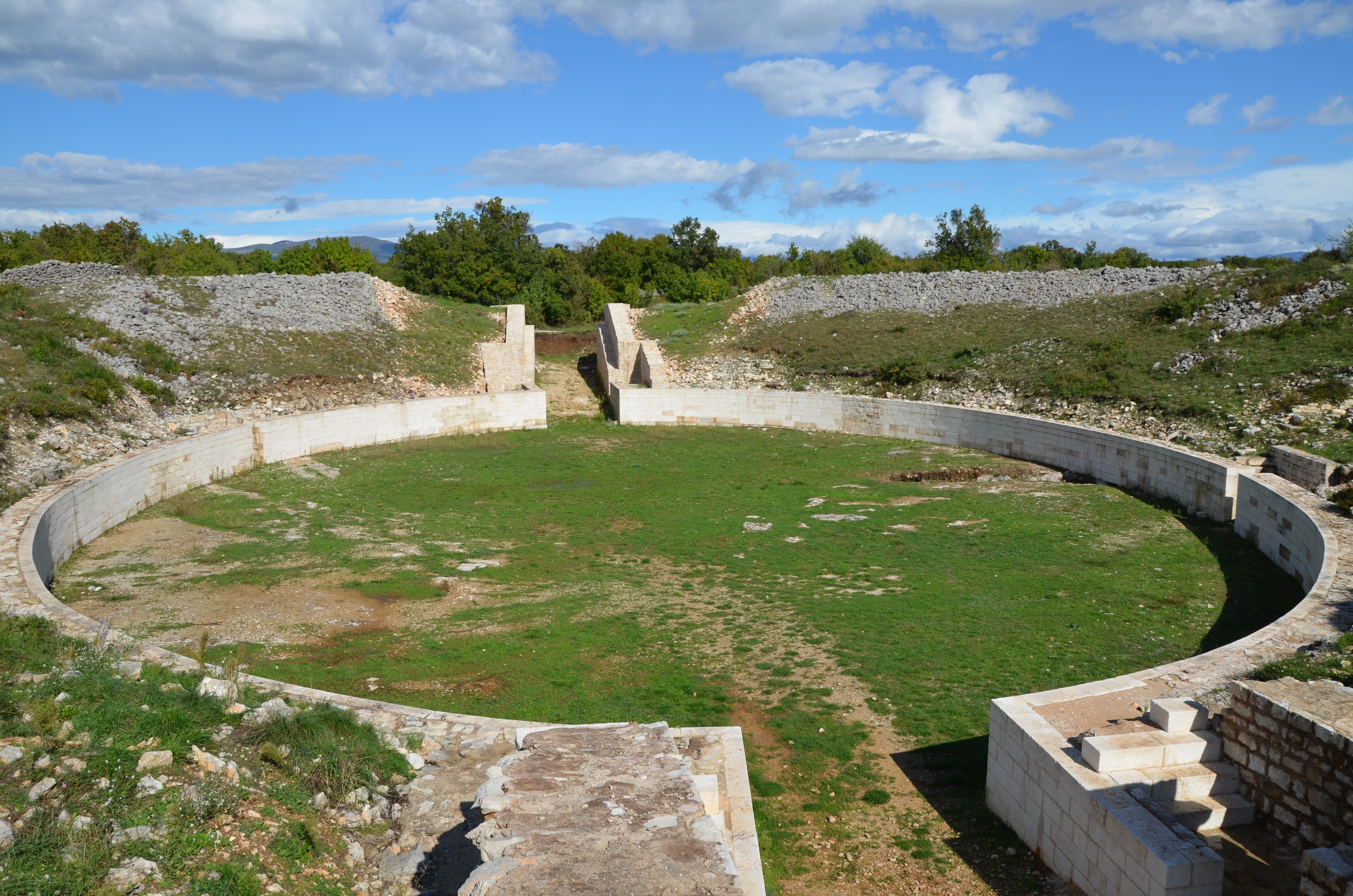
The amphitheatre

Traces of the ramparts of the Legionary fortress can still be seen. Also a smaller military training camp nearby has been excavated.

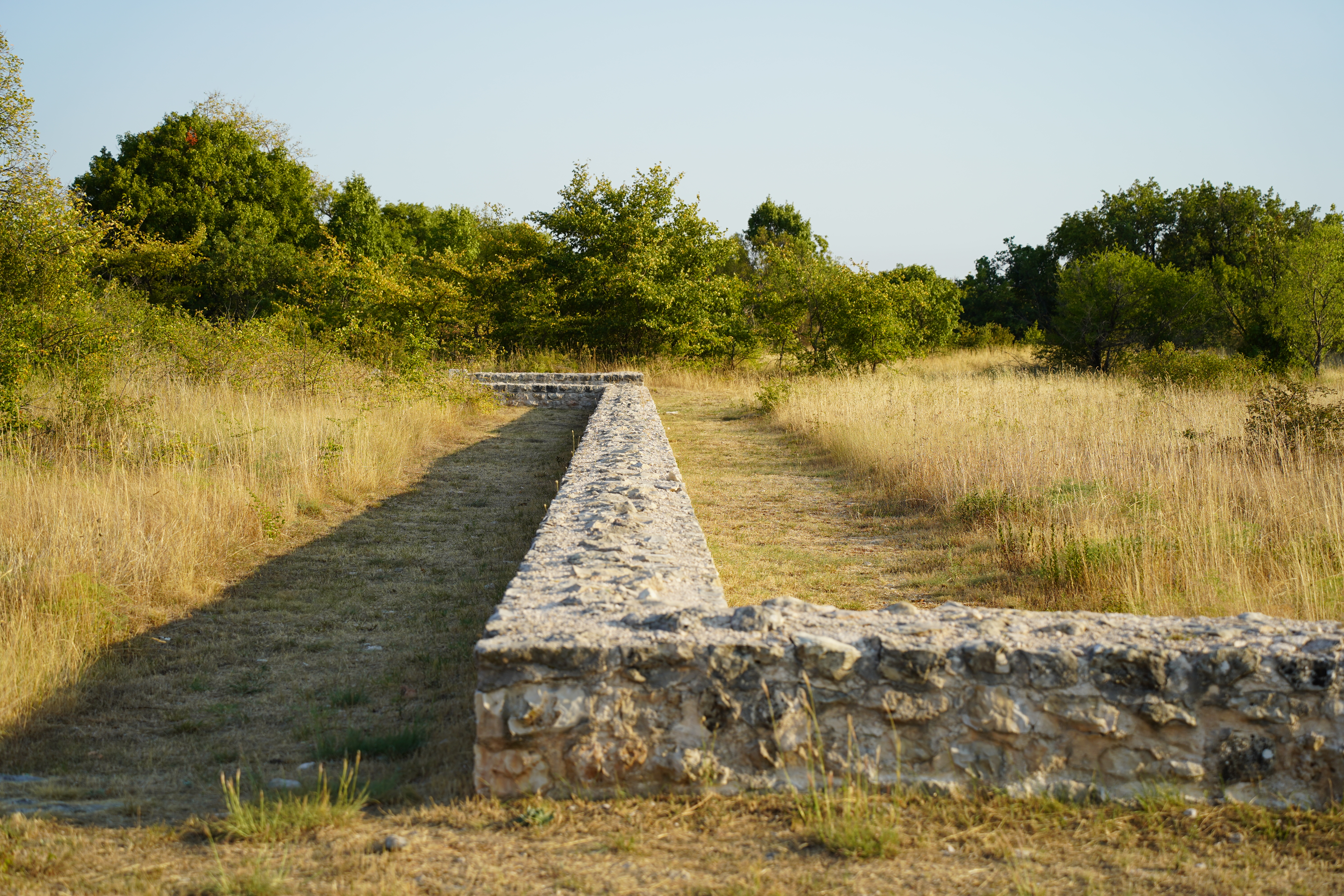
Burnum Military training Camp

=== Amphitheatre ===
The military amphitheatre at Burnum is estimated to have been able to accommodate 6,000 spectators. It had four entrances and used the natural terrain, being cut into the bedrock of the karst by soldiers from Legio XI, but it was later turned over to civilian use. Coins found there enable parts to be dated to the reign of the Emperor Claudius. The amphitheatre eventually collapsed through disuse and neglect.

=== The Principia ===
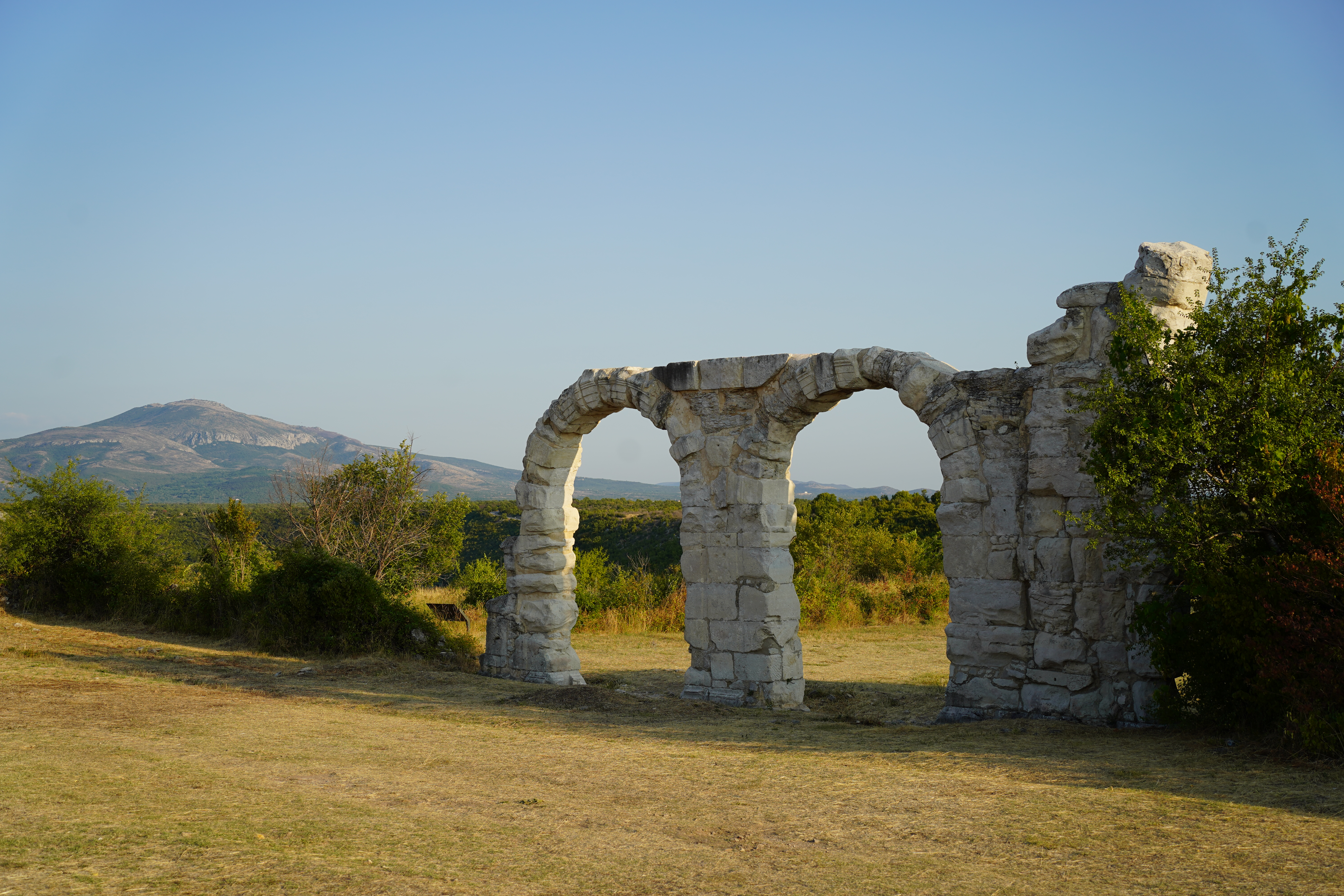
Principia

This headquarters building at the centre of the fortress with dimensions of 46 x 53 m was completed during the reign of Tiberius (14-37 AD). After the rebellion it was extended to approximately 104 x 73 m. It consisted of two long wings (with the legionary offices) around an interior courtyard, with arched arcades and at the rear a shorter wing that contained the legionary shrine where the battle standards were kept. During the reign of Hadrian (117-138 AD) after the garrison had departed, the building was converted into a civil basilica with courtroom, market and meeting place.

=== Aqueduct ===
The Plavno Polje is an entirely underground aqueduct as it did not need delivery at a high level, and had the benefit that the water stayed cool in the summer and could not freeze in the winter. It is about 32.6 km long, with 170m height difference between the source and the town. It flowed at 86 litres per second.

The location is only partially archaeologically investigated.

==== Legends ====
There are two old legends about the construction of this aqueduct. The first story is:

Two men courted a woman. One man should build a town, the other man should build an aqueduct to this town. And who would be first, he would receive her as his wife. Both done simultaneously, but that one, who had built the town, judged, that his town was not finished yet, and so the other one should marry her. With the earth, which was dugged out at the building of the aqueduct, was built a hill and on the hill a village. The name of that one, who built the aqueduct, was Rade and so is the village also called Radučka glavica.

Another old legend about this aqueduct is:

Selemnus, a beautiful young shepherd in those parts, was beloved by Argyra, the Nymph, from whom the town and fountain of that name were called; but the flower of his age being over, the Nymph deserted him, upon which he pined away, and was transformed into a river by Venus; after this he still retained his former passion, and for some time conveyed his waters, through a subterraneous passage, to Argyra's fountain. And because they both had separated, but their story was never forgotten, the names remained in memory in Argyra and Selemnos near Korinth and in Argyruntum and Zrmanja. So the aqueduct stayed in memory. The major harbour of Liburnian navy since 5th century BC was Corynthia at eastern cape of Krk island.

== Literature ==
- Marin Buovac: O natpisnoj građi rimskih amfteatara na prostoru istočnojadranske obale / On the inscriptions of Roman amphitheatres in the Eastern Adriatic seaboard, Vjesnik za arheologiju i povijest dalmatinsku, Vol. 105, No. 1, 2012.
- Marin Buovac: Duhovni svijet i božanstva gladijatora u sklopu rimskih amfiteatara na tlu današnje Hrvatske / The spiritual world and deities of gladiators in Roman amphitheatres in the territory of present-day Croatia, Vjesnik Arheološkog muzeja u Zagrebu, Vol. 46 - 2014., str. 135 - 157.
- Marin Buovac: Rimski amfiteatri na tlu istočnog Jadrana i zaobalja / Römische Amphitheater auf dem ostadriatischen Gebiet und Hinterland, Histria Antiqua, vol. 22, Pula, 2013., str. 129 - 156.
