= Plataneiko =

- Native name: Πλατανέικο (Greek)

Location
- Country: Greece

Physical characteristics
- Source
  - location: Achaia prefecture
- Mouth
  - elevation: Gulf of Patras
- Length: approx. 15 km (9.3 mi)
- Basin size: Ionian Sea

Plataneiko (Greek: Πλατανέικο) is a river in the northern part of the Achaia prefecture. It is part of the Kladeos River watershed. The river flows entirely in municipalities of Rio and empties into the Gulf of Patras.

== Geography ==
The river begins near Ano Kastritsi. At the course of the river passes near the town of Platani where it receives the river's name, it empties into the Gulf of Corinth. The area receives water every year and during the winter, it faces floods and causes damages.

== Nearby ==
- Platani
