= Argyra (Achaea) =

Argyra (Ancient Greek: Ἀργυρᾶ) was a town or village in ancient Achaea, in the neighbourhood of Patrae. It was located near the river Selemnus, the spring Argyra and the town of Bolina. Pausanias says it was on the road from Patrae to Aegium, following the Caradrus river. Pausanias relates a local legend that Argyra was a sea-nymph, who fell in love with a shepherd boy named Selemnus and used to come up out of the sea to visit him, sleeping by his side, but when Selemnus lost its beauty, the nymph stopped visiting him and Selemnus died of a broken heart. Then, Aphrodite transformed Selemnus into a river, the Selemnos. In the war between the Achaeans and the Romans Patrae suffered so severely, that the greater part of the inhabitants abandoned the city and took up their abodes in the surrounding villages of Mesatis, Antheia, Bolina, Argyra, and Arba. A long time later, the Emperor Augustus forced the inhabitants of these places to abandon them to repopulate the city of Patrae. In the time of Pausanias (2nd century) the town was in ruins.

Its site is unlocated. The modern village of Argyra takes its name from the ancient place.

Map of ancient Achaea (with place names in Greek)
