= Mesatis =

Mesatis (Ancient Greek: Μεσάτις) was a town of ancient Achaea, in the neighbourhood of Patrae. It is said to have been founded by the Ionians, when they occupied the country. After their expulsion,, the Achaean hero Patreus withdrew the inhabitants from Antheia and Mesatis to Aroë, which he enlarged and called Patrae after himself. The city's acropolis probably continued to be called Aroë, which was often synonymous with Patrae. In the war between the Achaeans and the Romans, Patrae suffered so severely that most residents left for the surrounding villages of Mesatis, Antheia, Bolina, Argyra, and Arba.

Map of ancient Achaea (with place names in Greek)

Its site is unlocated. The modern Messatida takes its name from the ancient place.
