= Argyra, Greece =

Argyra Αργυρά
- Community
- Location within Greece
- Coordinates: 38°17′N 21°52′E
- Country: Greece
- Administrative region: West Greece
- Regional unit: Achaea
- Municipality: Patras
- Municipal unit: Rio

Population (2021)
  - Community: 210
- Time zone: UTC+2 (EET)
  - Summer (DST): UTC+3 (EEST)
- Vehicle registration: AX

Argyra (Greek: Αργυρά, before 1928: Άβερνα - Averna) is a village in the municipal unit of Rio, Achaea, Greece. It is situated in the northern foothills of the Panachaiko, at about 450 m elevation. It is 2 km west of Sella and 7 km east of Rio. A wind energy facility has been built about 4 km to the south.

== Population ==
Year	Population
1981	305
1991	275
2001	370
2011	288
2021	210

== History ==
The ancient town Argyra was located near the river Selemnos, the spring Argyra and the town Boline. Both towns were already ruined in Pausanias' days (2nd century AD). According to local legend, Argyra was a sea-nymph, who fell in love with Selemnus and used to come up out of the sea to visit him, sleeping by his side. The exact location of the ancient town is unknown. The current village was renamed after the ancient town in 1928.

== See also ==
- List of settlements in Achaea
