= Kastritsi =

Kastritsi may refer to:

- Ano Kastritsi, a village in Achaea, Greece
- Kato Kastritsi, a village in Achaea, Greece
- Charikleia Kastritsi (born 1983), Greek female weightlifter who competed in the 2004 Summer Olympics

== See also ==
- Kastritsa, a village in Epirus, Greece
