= Kato Rodini =

Kato Rodini Κάτω Ροδινή
- Settlement
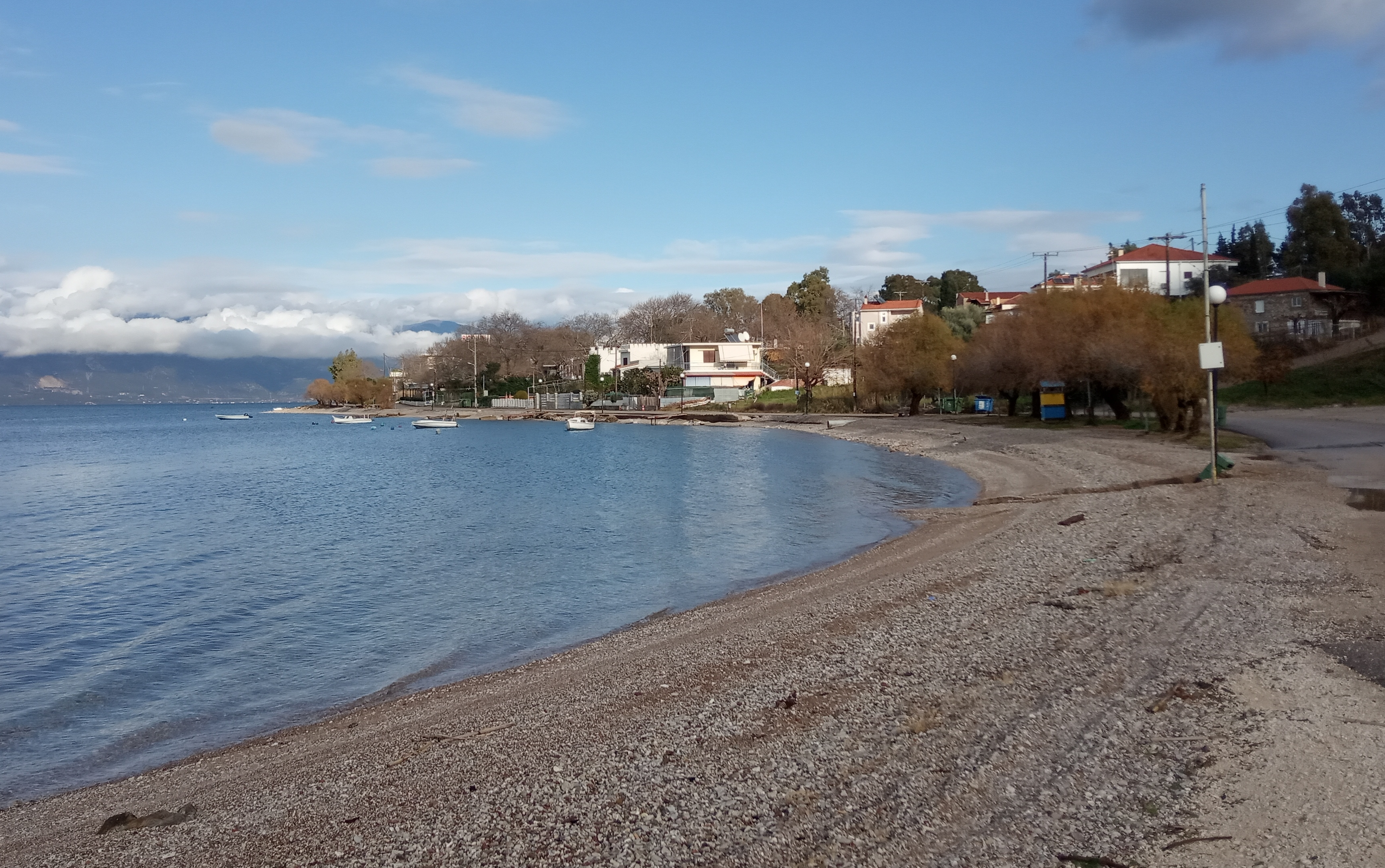
- The small beach of Kato Rodini

- Location within Greece
- Coordinates: 38°19′34″N 21°53′35″E
- Country: Greece
- Administrative region: Western Greece
- Regional unit: Achaea
- Municipality: Patras
- Municipal unit: Rio
- Community: Psathopyrgos
- Elevation: 20 m (66 ft)

Population (2021)
  - Total: 112
- Time zone: UTC+2 (EET)
  - Summer (DST): UTC+3 (EEST)
- Postal code: 26504
- Vehicle registration: AX, AZ

Kato Rodini (Greek: Κάτω Ροδινή) is a small coastal settlement in the municipal unit of Rio in the northern part of Achaea, Greece. It is located 2 km north east of Psathopyrgos and 18 km north east of Patras. The Greek National Road 8A (Patras - Aigio - Corinth) pass south of the village. In 1996 the settlement was attached to the neighboring village of Psathopyrgos. The sea and the beach of Rodini is similar to all the beaches of north Peloponnese, 3–5 meters wide with peebles and clean, fresh waters.

== Gallery ==
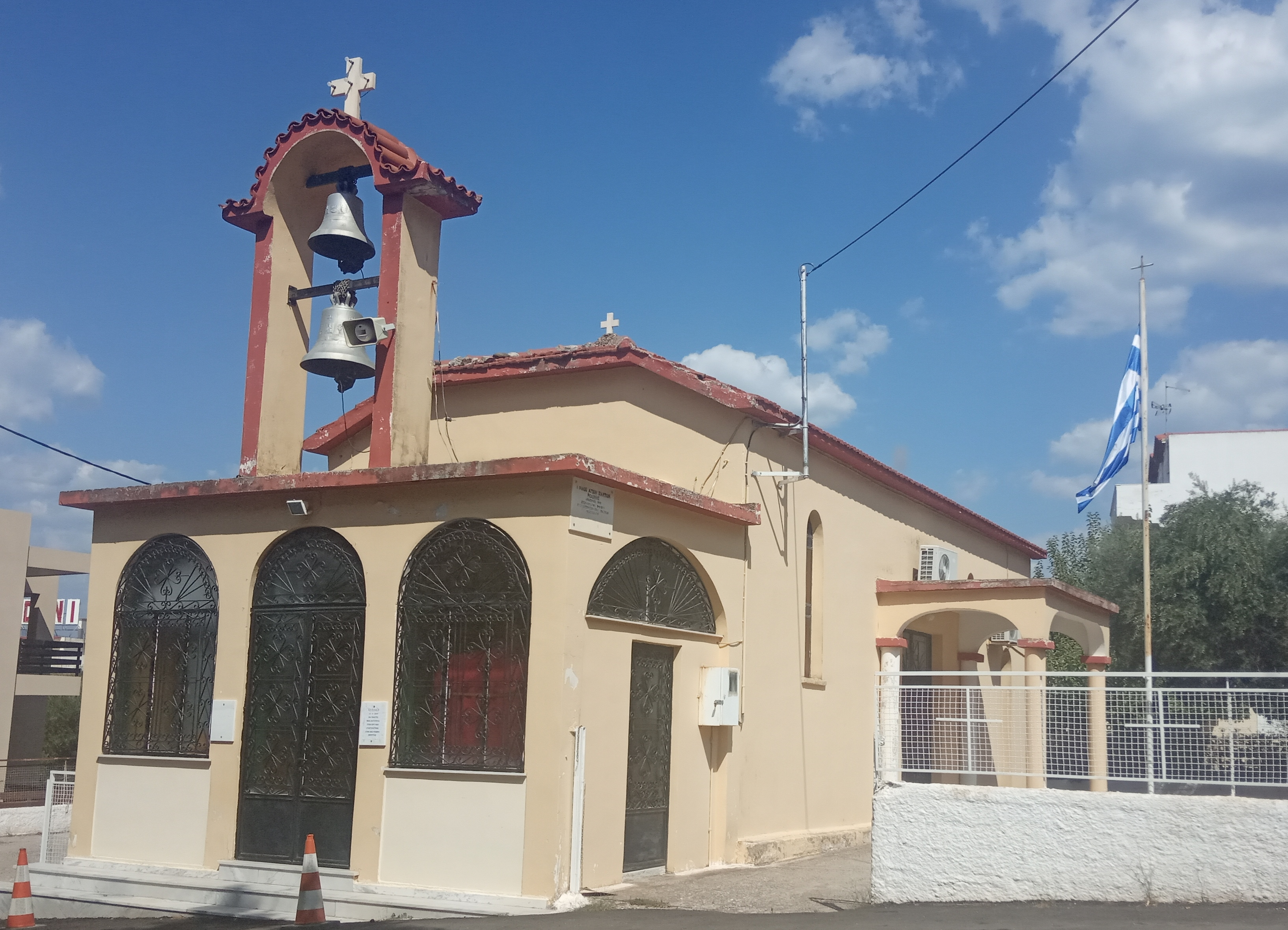
The small Greek Orthodox Church of All Saints in Kato Rodini (2019)

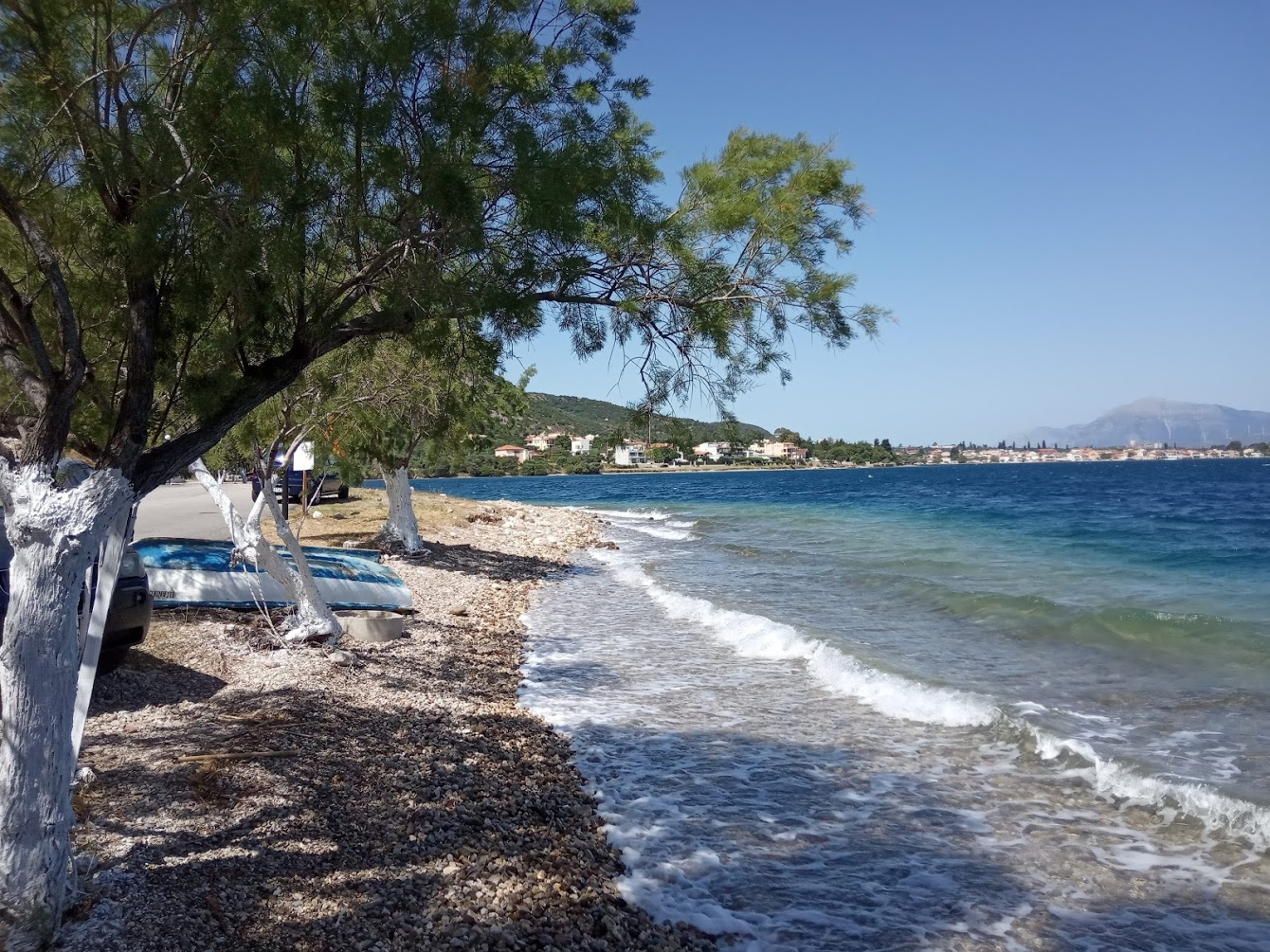
View of Kato Rodini beach during summer (2020)

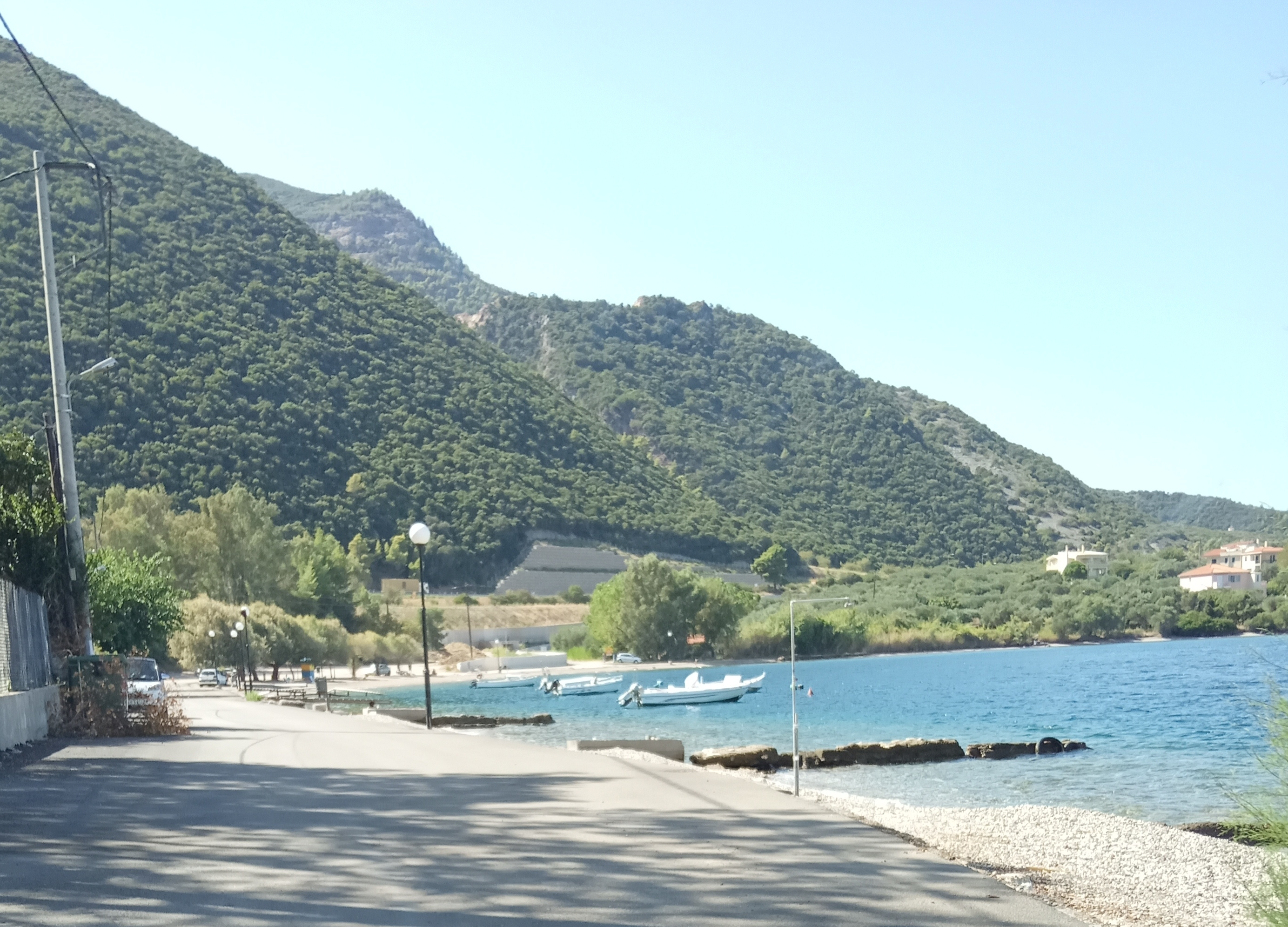
The coastal road and the beach of Kato Rodini (2019)

== See also ==
- List of settlements in Achaea
