= Cynus =

Greek port attested by ancient authors

Coordinates: 38°43′24″N 23°03′44″E

Cynus (Ancient Greek: Κῦνος, romanized: Kynos) was the principal sea-port of the Opuntian Locrians, situated on a cape at the northern extremity of the Opuntian Gulf in Greece.

== Historical mentions ==
Cynus was an ancient town, being mentioned in the Homeric Catalogue of Ships in the Iliad. It was reported to have been the residence of Deucalion and Pyrrha; the tomb of the latter was shown there. Beside Livy and Homer, Cynus is mentioned by other ancient authors, including Strabo, Pomponius Mela, Pliny the Elder, and Ptolemy.

Colonists from Cynus were said to have founded Autocane in Aeolis, situated opposite the island of Lesbos. It was one of the places that suffered the destruction caused by a tsunami that took place after an earthquake in 426 BCE. In 207 BCE, during the First Macedonian War, Cynus, which appears defined as an emporium of Opus, was the place to which the fleet of Publius Sulpicius Galba Maximus retired after failing in its attack against Chalcis.

== Location ==
Ancient sources describe Cynus as sitting opposite Aedepsus in Euboea, and at the distance of 60 stadia from Opus. Livy describes it as situated on the coast, at the distance of a mile from Opus.

== Name ==
It took its name from Cynus, son of Opus and father of Hodoedocus and Larymna.

== Archaeology ==
The site is marked by a tower, called Paleopyrgo (or Pyrgos), and some Hellenic remains, about a mile to the south of the village of Livanates. The archaeological site is thus also referred to as Pyrgos Livanaton. The site was excavated between 1985 and 1995 by the 14th Ephorate of Prehistoric and Classical Antiquities in Lamia. As of 2007, the findings of these excavations had only been made known in preliminary reports, but archaeologists have found items from the Bronze and Early Iron Age.

Kynos, like nearby Mitrou, Kalapodi, Elateia, and Lefkandi, shows continuous occupation throughout the transition from the Mycenaean palatial period to the Early Iron Age.
