= Drepano =

Drepano (Greek: Δρέπανο) may refer to the following places in Greece:

- Drepano, Argolis a place in Argolis
- Drepano, Achaea, village in the municipality of Patras, Achaia
- Drepano, Kozani, a place in the Kozani regional unit
