= Pititsa =

Pititsa Πιτίτσα
- Community
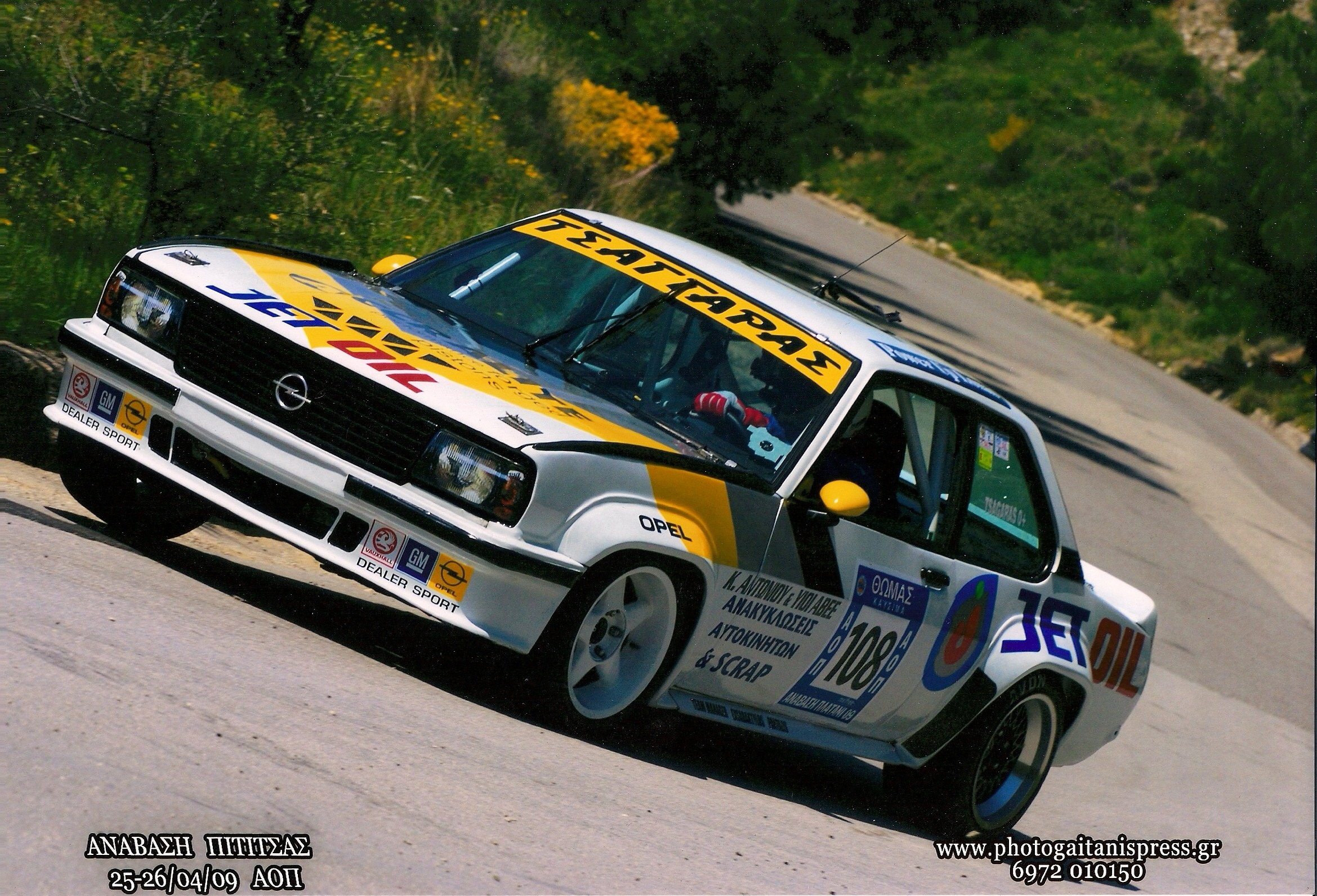
- Pititsa hill climb, 2009

- Location within Greece
- Coordinates: 38°16′N 21°54′E
- Country: Greece
- Administrative region: West Greece
- Regional unit: Achaea
- Municipality: Patras
- Municipal unit: Rio

Population (2021)
  - Community: 20
- Time zone: UTC+2 (EET)
  - Summer (DST): UTC+3 (EEST)
- Vehicle registration: AX

Pititsa (Greek: Πιτίτσα) is a mountain village in the municipal unit of Rio, Achaea, Greece. It is situated in the northern foothills of the Panachaiko, at about 700 m elevation. It is 2 km southeast of Sella and 11 km east of Rio. It is known for the Pititsa hill climb, an uphill car race.

== Population ==
Year	Population
1981	78
1991	168
2001	82
2011	26
2021	20

== See also ==
- List of settlements in Achaea
