= Argyre =

Argyre (meaning silver in Greek) may refer to:

- Chryse and Argyre, a pair of legendary islands, mentioned by ancient writers
- Argyre, the metropolis of the island Iabadius or Sabadius (most probably modern Java), mentioned by ancient writers
- Argyre Planitia, is a plain located within the impact basin Argyre[a] in the southern highlands of Mars.
- Argyre quadrangle, a cartographic quadrangle of Mars
- Feminine form of Argyros
