= Arachovitika =

Arachovitika Αραχωβίτικα
- Community
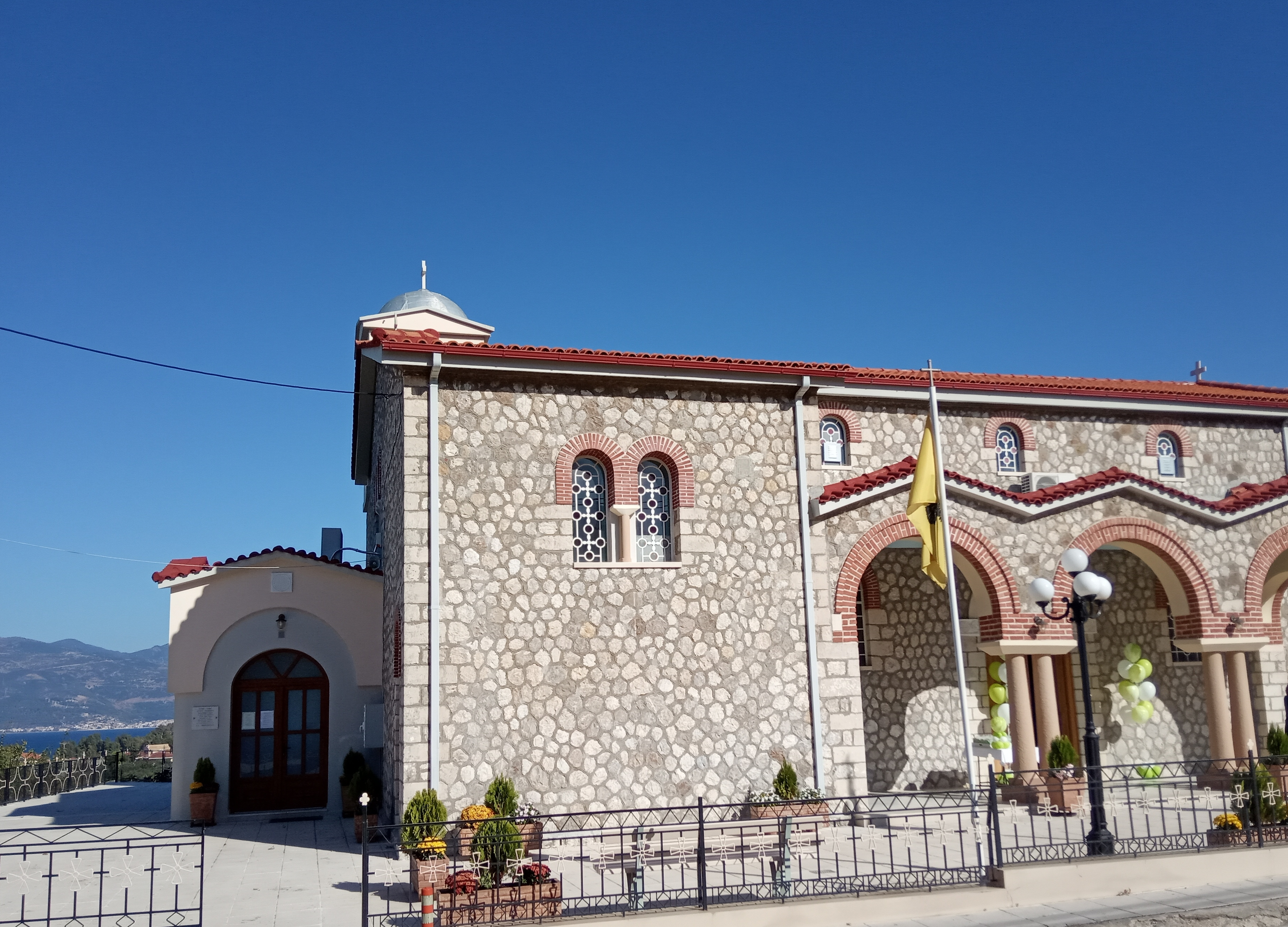
- The main church of Arachovitika dedicated to Saint Andrew

- Location within Greece
- Coordinates: 38°19′N 21°50′E
- Country: Greece
- Administrative region: West Greece
- Regional unit: Achaea
- Municipality: Patras
- Municipal unit: Rio
- Elevation: 18 m (59 ft)

Population (2021)
  - Community: 746
- Time zone: UTC+2 (EET)
  - Summer (DST): UTC+3 (EEST)
- Postal code: 265 00
- Area code: 2610
- Vehicle registration: AX

Arachovitika (Greek: Αραχωβίτικα) is a village and a community in the municipal unit of Rio in the northern part of Achaea, Greece. It is situated on the Gulf of Corinth, 1 km northwest of Drepano and 6 km northeast of Rio. The Greek National Road 8A (Patras - Corinth) passes south of the village, and the railway Patras - Corinth runs through the village. The community consists of the villages Arachovitika and Kato Arachovitika. There is a port next to Cape Drepano.

== Historical population ==
Year	Population village	Population community
1981	-	519
1991	400	734
2001	492	743
2011	305	902
2021	396	746

== See also ==
- List of settlements in Achaea
