= Platani =

Platani may refer to:

- Platani, Cyprus, a village in the Famagusta District, Cyprus
- Platani, Achaea, a village in the municipal unit of Rio, Achaea, Greece
- Platani, Pella, a village in Edessa, Pella, Greece
- Platani (river), a river in southern Sicily, Italy

== See also ==
- San Biagio Platani, a municipality in the Province of Agrigento, Sicily, Italy
