= Bolina =

Nymph in Greek mythology

In Greek mythology, Bolina (/boʊˈlaɪnə/; Ancient Greek: Βολίνα) or Boline (Βολίνη) was a nymph. According to Pausanias, Bolina was once a mortal maiden of Achaea. She was loved by the god Apollo, and when he attempted to approach her, Bolina fled from him and threw herself into the sea to escape his advances. Thereupon the god made her immortal. On the spot where Bolina fell into the sea, the town Bolina was founded.
