= Aedepsus =

Town in ancient Euboea

Coordinates: 38°51′33″N 23°02′44″E

Aedepsus or Aidepsos (Ancient Greek: Αἴδηψος) was a town upon the northwestern coast of ancient Euboea, 160 stadia from Cynus on the opposite coast of the Opuntian Locris. It contained warm baths sacred to Heracles, which were used by the Roman dictator Sulla. These warm baths are still found about a mile (1.5 km) above the modern town of Aidipsos.

Its site is located near the modern village of Loutra Aidipsou.
