= Pititsa hill climb =

Greek automobile hillclimbing competition

The Pititsa hill climb is an automobile hillclimbing competition which occurs in the village of Pititsa, about 15 km northeast of Patras in Achaea regional unit, Greece.

It began in 1973 with the champion named Leonidas who drove a Porsche Carrera RSR; the length was then 3.8 km. The Pititsa hill climb is a competition of the Greek Hill Climb Championship; it is the oldest and the most historic event along with the Ritsona hill climb in Ritsona. For many years two championship events were held in the track near Pititsa. In 1998 there were some problems with the road, so the hill climb moved to Omplos until 2007, when it returned again to Pititsa.

== Winners (best time) ==
Year	Driver	Car
1973	Leonidas	Porsche 911 Carrera RSR
1974	Scirocco	Renault
1975	Giorgos Moschous	Alfa Romeo Tipo 33
1975	Iaveris	Alfa Romeo 2000
1976	Giorgos Moschous	Alfa Romeo Tipo 33
1977	M. Saliaris	Lola
1977	M. Saliaris	Lola
1978	Melas	Chevron
1979	M. Saliaris	Ford
1979	M. Saliaris	Ford
1980	J. Ragusa	Chevron
1980	M. Saliaris	Ford
1981	Nino	Lola
1982	M. Saliaris	ΑΒΜ 001
1982	M. Saliaris	ΑΒΜ
1983	M. Saliaris	ΑΒΜ 001
1983	M. Saliaris	ΑΒΜ 001
1984	Nino	Lola Super
1984	M. Saliaris	ΑΒΜ 001
1985	M. Saliaris	ΑΒΜ 001
1985	M. Saliaris	ΑΒΜ 001
1986	M. Saliaris	ΑΒΜ 001
1987	James	ΑΒΜ
1988	M. Saliaris	ΑΒΜ
1989	Nino	Ralt-Alfa Romeo
1990	Nino	Ralt-Alfa Romeo
1991	Leonidas Kyrkos	Ford Sierra RS Cosworth
1992	Leonidas Kyrkos	Ford Sierra RS Cosworth
1993	Leonidas Kyrkos	Ford Cosworth
1994	Nikos Aggloupas	Ford Escort RS Cosworth
1995	Leonidas Kyrkos	Ford Escort RS Cosworth
1996	Leonidas Kyrkos	Ford Escort RS Cosworth
1997	Leonidas Kyrkos	Ford Escort WRC
1998	Leonidas Kyrkos	Ford Escort WRC
2007	(abandoned)	-
2008	Lambros Kyrkos	Ford Escort WRC
2009	Marios Iliopoulos	Ford Escort WRC
2010	Anthony Chatzivasileiou	Seat Cordoba WRC
2011		
2012	Michalis Efthymiou	Ford Escort WRC

== Sources ==
- The first version of this article has been based in the text of el:Ανάβαση Πιτίτσας of the Greek Wikipedia published under GFDL.
