= Volinaios =

- Native name: Βολιναίος (Greek)

Location
- Country: Greece
- Region: Achaea

Physical characteristics
- Source
  - location: Panachaiko
- Mouth
  - location: Gulf of Corinth
  - coordinates: 38.3368°N 21.8676°E
- Length: approx. 20 km (12 mi)

The Volinaios (Greek: Βολιναίος, also Δρεπανέικο Drepaneiko, Latin: Bolinaeus) is a river in the northern part of Achaea, Greece. It empties into the Gulf of Corinth. The river is named after the ancient town of Boline. The river begins in the northern part of the Panachaiko mountains, it flows through the village Drepano where it has water all year round. The river flows into the Gulf of Corinth near Psathopyrgos.
