= Mitrou =

Archaeological site in Greece

The archaeological site of -Mitrou is located on a tidal islet in the Gulf of Atalanti, in East Lokris in Central Greece. Excavation of the site is conducted under the direction of the American School of Classical Studies, and as of 2007 was ongoing.

== Findings ==
Finds from surface survey indicate humans were already present in the Neolithic period; occupation continued throughout the Bronze Age and into the Early Iron Age. In addition to the settlement, a Bronze Age boat and burials dating to the Bronze and Early Iron Ages have been found close to the settlement. Part of the site's importance derives from the apparently continuous habitation here after the end of the Mycenaean palatial Bronze Age, with no gap apparent between the post-palatial Bronze Age and the Early Iron Age. This situation is mirrored in other Central Greek sites, such as Lefkandi, Kalapodi, Elateia, and Pyrgos Livanaton/Kynos.

== See also ==
- Elijah Mitrou-Long (born 1996), Canadian-Greek basketball player for Hapoel Holon of the Israeli Basketball Premier League
