= Sella, Greece =

Sella Σελλά
- Community
- Location within Greece
- Coordinates: 38°17′N 21°53′E
- Country: Greece
- Administrative region: West Greece
- Regional unit: Achaea
- Municipality: Patras
- Municipal unit: Rio

Population (2021)
  - Community: 268
- Time zone: UTC+2 (EET)
  - Summer (DST): UTC+3 (EEST)
- Vehicle registration: AX

Sella (Greek: Σελλά) is a village in the municipal unit of Rio, Achaea, Greece. It is located in the northern foothills of the Panachaiko, at 500 m above sea level. The river Volinaios flows east and north of the village. It is 2 km east of Argyra and 9 km east of Rio.

== Population ==
| Year | Population |
|---|---|
| 1981 | 313 |
| 1991 | 384 |
| 2001 | 388 |
| 2011 | 302 |
| 2021 | 268 |

== See also ==
- List of settlements in Achaea
