= Kladeos =

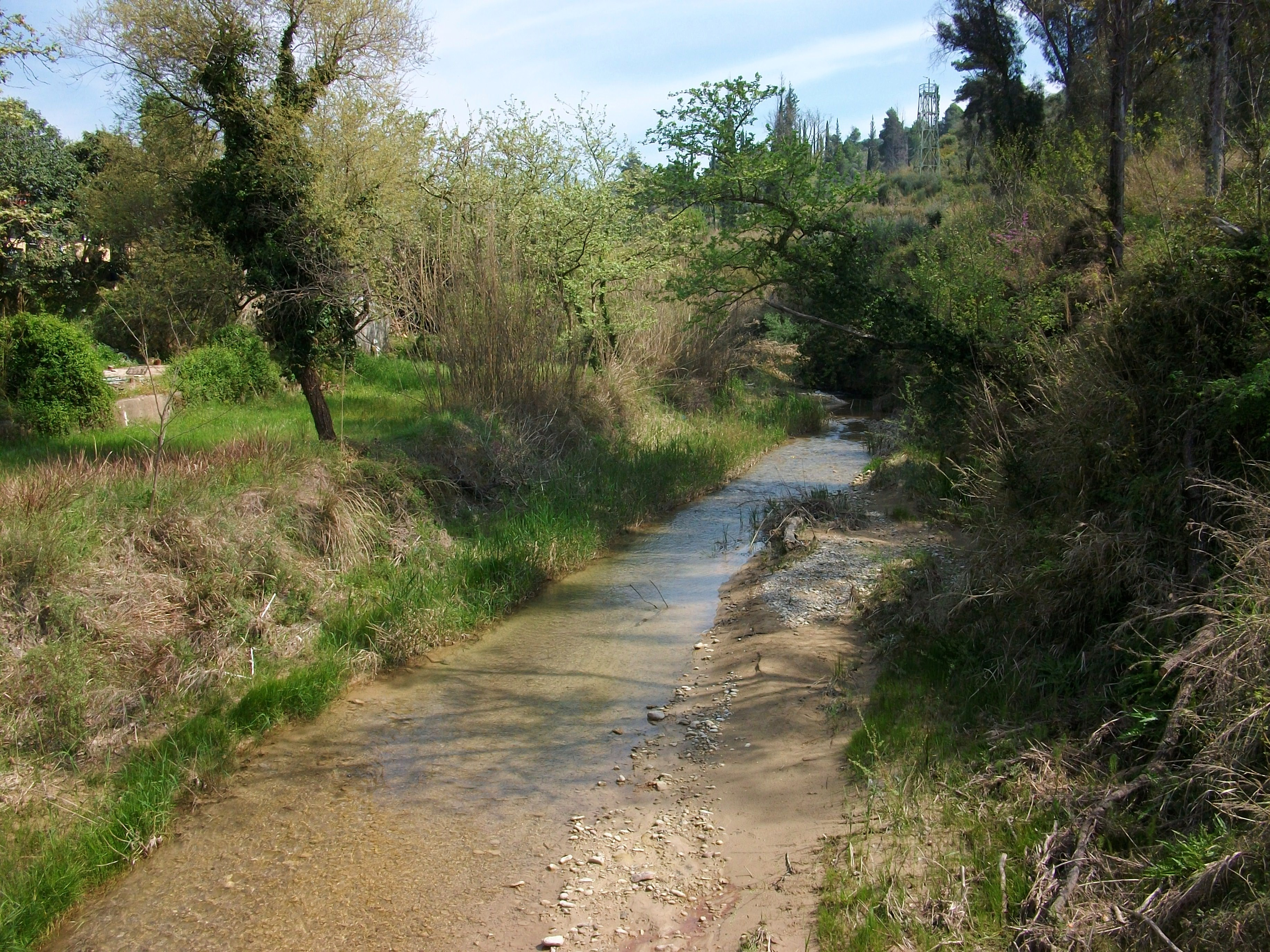

Location
- Country: Greece

Physical characteristics
- Source
  - location: Peloponnese
- Mouth
  - location: Alfeios
  - coordinates: 37°37′59″N 21°37′34″E

Basin features
- Progression: Alfeios→ Ionian Sea

The river Kladeos flows through Olympia in Elis, Southern Greece, and empties into the river Alfeios. As a tributary of the Alfeios, the Kladeos is fed by the Plataneiko, Lagadino, Gani, and Liakoto streams. Already in classical antiquity, the river was diverted near Olympia in order to prevent flooding in winter. However, the sanctuary of Olympia was covered by a 4 m thick layer of sediment when it was excavated in 1875.

The river is named after Kladeos (Greek: Κλάδεος, Latin: Cladeus), a river god in Greek mythology who was one of the sons of Oceanus and Tethys.
