= Selemnus (god) =

River-god in Greek mythology

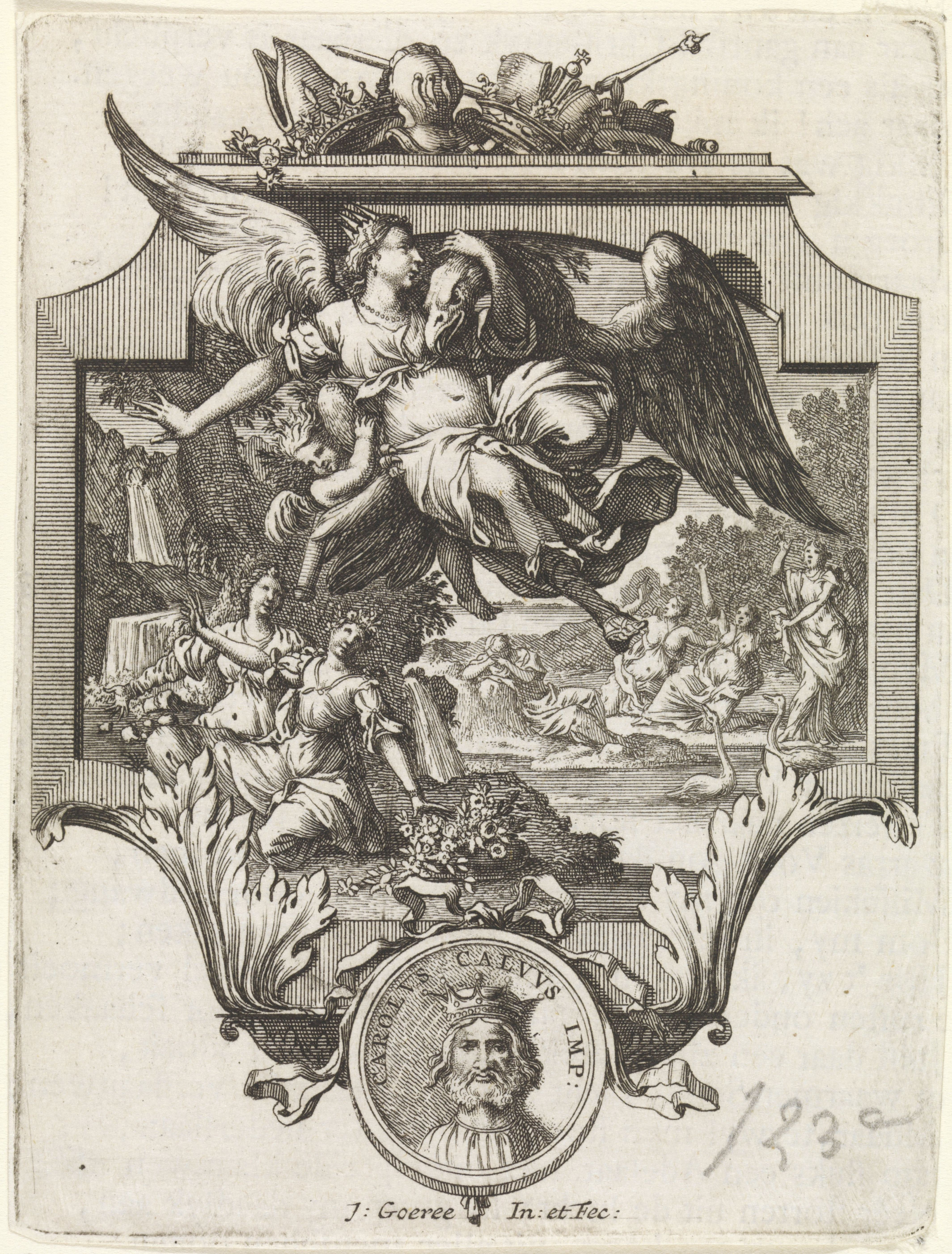
Selemnus is changed into a river-god (detail), 1710 engraving by Jan Goeree, Rijksmuseum Amsterdam.

In Greek mythology, Selemnus (Ancient Greek: Σέλεμνος, romanized: Sélemnos) is a young shepherd boy turned river god from the Peloponnese in southern Greece. He was traditionally the divine personification of the Selemnos, a river which flows in the region of Achaea, northern Peloponnese. Selemnus is notable for his brief and tragic love story with the nymph Argyra, preserved in the Description of Greece, a travel guide by Pausanias, an ancient Greek traveller of the second century AD.

== Family ==
Traditionally, the 3,000 river gods were said to be the children of the Titans Oceanus and his sister-wife Tethys, although in the Achaean tradition Selemnus having been a mortal man originally means he would have had different parents, who are not given names in the surviving texts.

== Mythology ==
According to a local Patraean myth, the river Selemnus was originally a mortal man, a young and handsome shepherd who used to feed his flock by the Argyra spring near the town of Argyra. The sea-nymph of that spring, Argyra, fell in love with him and would often visit him and sleep by his side. But as the years passed and Selemnus grew older and less handsome, Argyra ceased to visit him with the same frequency as before. Eventually she stopped coming to him altogether and withdrew to her liquid home.

Selemnus was heartbroken over her desertation. In his despair he wasted away and eventually died of grief. Aphrodite, the goddess of love, pitied the unfortunate man so she turned him into a river which took his name, Selemnos. But even in his new aquatic form he still pined for Argyra and missed her terribly, so Aphrodite further helped him out by wiping out all of his memories of Argyra and his love for her.

For that reason, men and women of Achaea would wash themselves in the waters of the Selemnus in order to rid themselves of their erotic passions. Pausanias, who rarely makes remarks on the legends he relates, comments that if true, this would make the river more valuable to mankind than any wealth.

== Culture ==
Selemnus and Argyra's myth seems to have been modelled on the myth of the river-god Alpheus and the nymph-turned-spring Arethusa, to which it is explicitly compared. The myth also serves as a doublet to the story of Tithonus and Eos, as both feature an immortal goddess who falls in love with a mortal man, but ceases to love and visit him the more he ages and loses his beauty, though Selemnus' fate is a bit less grim in the end compared to Tithonus'. In Propertius's telling, he wrote that Eos did not forsake Tithonus, old and aged as he was, and would still embrace him and hold him in her arms rather than leaving him deserted in his cold chamber, while cursing the gods for his cruel fate.

Due to the scarcity of preserved historical evidence, it cannot be determined with certainty whether Selemnus was a prominent river-god, as merely one mythological tale concerning him survives, and it focuses on his mortal, pre-fluvial life. The legend was probably invented to offer an aetiological explanation for the name of the spring and its unique, magical properties.

Today the Selemnos is all but dried up, only a narrow torrent remains. The exact location of the ancient town near which the story took place remains unidentified.

== See also ==
Other transformations in Greek mythology include:

- Echo
- Rhodopis and Euthynicus
- Arethusa of Ithaca

== Bibliography ==
- Avery, Catherine B., ed. (1962). New Century Classical Handbook. New York, US: Appleton-Century-Crofts.
- Bell, Robert E. (1991). Women of Classical Mythology: A Biographical Dictionary. ABC-Clio. ISBN 9780874365818.
- Brewster, Harry (1997). The River Gods of Greece. London, New York: I.B. Tauris Publishers. ISBN 1-86064-207-1.
- Forbes Irving, Paul M. C. (1990). Metamorphosis in Greek Myths. Clarendon Press. ISBN 0-19-814730-9.
- Grimal, Pierre (1987). The Dictionary of Classical Mythology. Wiley-Blackwell. ISBN 0-631-13209-0.
- Hard, Robin (2004). The Routledge Handbook of Greek Mythology: Based on H. J. Rose's "Handbook of Greek Mythology". Routledge. ISBN 9780415186360.
- Hesiod, Theogony, in The Homeric Hymns and Homerica, with an English translation by Hugh G. Evelyn-White, Cambridge, MA., Harvard University Press; London, William Heinemann Ltd. 1914. Online version at the Perseus Digital Library.
- Hutton, William (2010). "Pausanias and the Mysteries of Hellas". Transactions of the American Philological Association. 140 (2): 423–459. doi:10.1353/apa.2010.a402239. JSTOR 40890985.
- Hutton, William (May 20, 2009). "Pausanias the Novelist". In Grammatiki, Karla (ed.). Fiction on the Fringe: Novelistic Writing in the Post-Classical Age. doi:10.1163/ej.9789004175471.i-194.45. ISBN 978-90-04-17547-1.
- Keightley, Thomas (1838). The Mythology of Ancient Greece and Italy (2nd ed.). London, UK: Whittaker and Co.
- March, Jennifer R. (May 31, 2014). Dictionary of Classical Mythology. Oxbow Books. ISBN 978-1-78297-635-6.
- Pausanias, Description of Greece with an English translation by W.H.S. Jones, Litt.D., and H.A. Ormerod, M.A., in 4 Volumes. Cambridge, MA, Harvard University Press; London, William Heinemann Ltd. 1918. Online version at the Perseus Digital Library.
- Potter, John (1840). James Boyd (ed.). Archaeologia Graeca or the Antiquities of Greece. London, UK: T. Tegg.
- Smith, William (1873). A Dictionary of Greek and Roman Biography and Mythology. London, UK: John Murray, printed by Spottiswoode and Co. Online version at the Perseus.tufts library.
- Talbert, Richard (2000). Barrington Atlas of the Greek and Roman World. Princeton University Press. ISBN 978-0-691-03169-9.
- Tripp, Edward (June 1970). Crowell's Handbook of Classical Mythology (1st ed.). Thomas Y. Crowell Co. ISBN 069022608X.
