= Lefkandi =

Village in Euboea, Greece

Coordinates: 38°24′45″N 23°40′31″E

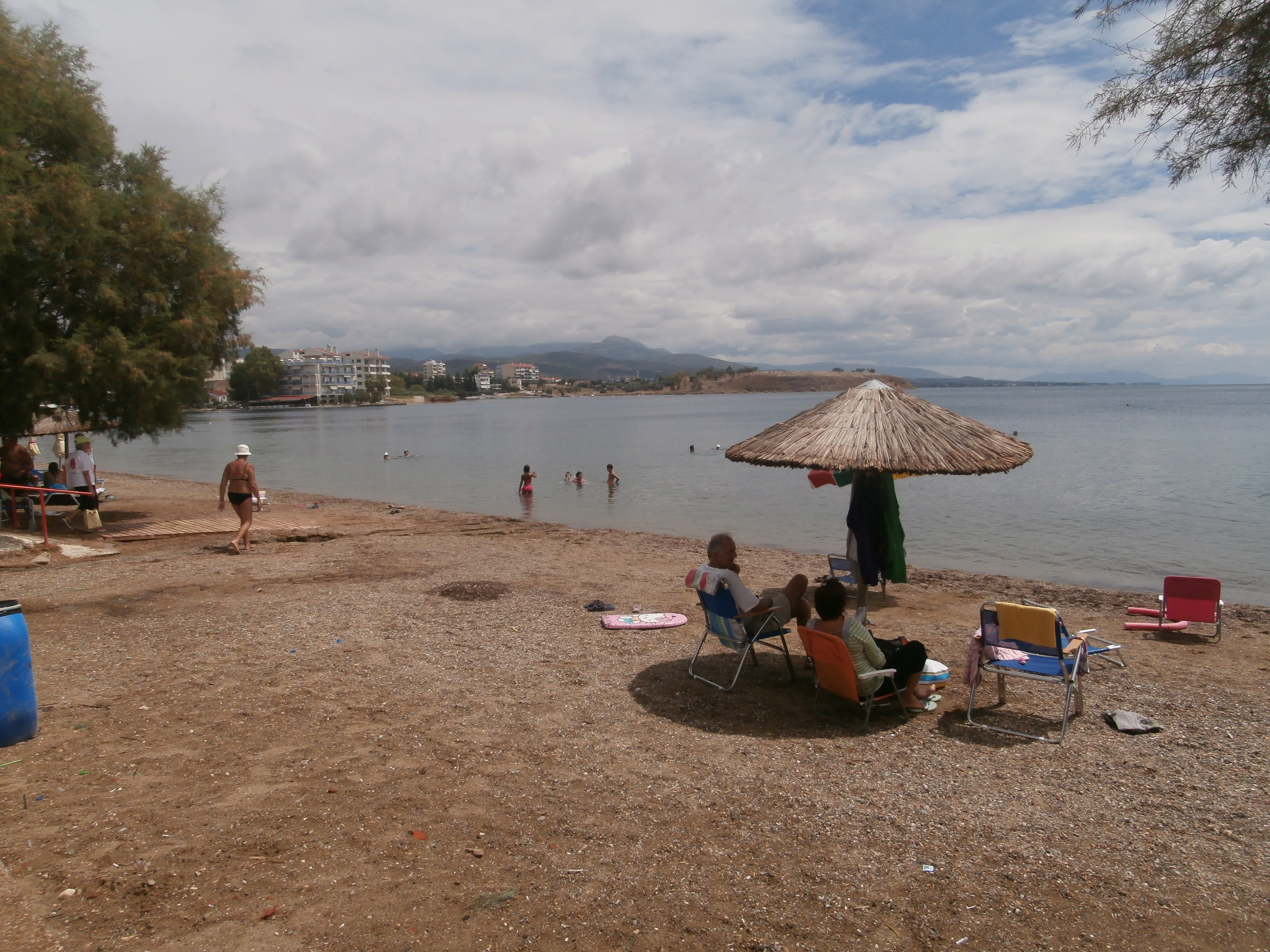
Beach at Lefkandi

Lefkandi (Greek: Λευκαντί) is a coastal village on the island of Euboea, Greece. Archaeological finds attest to a settlement on the promontory locally known as Xeropolis, while several associated cemeteries have been identified nearby. The settlement site is located on a promontory overlooking the Euripos Strait, with small bays forming natural harbours east and west of the site. The cemeteries are located on the hillslopes northwest of the settlement; the plots identified so far are known as the East Cemetery, Skoubris, Palia Perivolia, Toumba, in addition to further smaller groups of burials. The site is located between the island's two main cities in antiquity, Chalkis and Eretria.

== History ==
Occupation at Lefkandi can be traced back to the Early Bronze Age, and continued throughout the Bronze and Iron Ages, to end at the beginning of the Archaic period (early 7th century BCE). The known cemeteries cover only part of the periods attested in the settlement, dating to the Submycenaean through Subgeometric periods (c. 1050–800 BCE, the "Greek Dark Ages"). The abandonment of Lefkandi coincides with a rise in settlement activity in nearby Eretria, and it has been argued by the excavators that the site is, in fact, Old Eretria. Some scholars have identified Lefkandi as the site of the ancient city of Argura.

=== Early Bronze Age ===
==== Early Helladic IIB (2500-2350 BC) ====
The Lefkandi culture was a distinct culture in parts of Greece in Early Helladic IIB, concurrent with the Korakau culture.

=== Iron I - Late Helladic IIIC ===
The site's importance is due to a number of factors. First, substantial occupation strata of the Late Helladic IIIC period (c. 1200–1100/1075 BCE) excavated in the 1960s allowed the establishment of a ceramic sequence for this period, which at that time was insufficiently attested. The IIIC settlement furthermore stands in contrast to sites in the other parts of Greece, such as the Peloponnese, where many sites were abandoned at the end of LHIIIB (i.e. the end of the Mycenaean palatial period). This situation places Lefkandi within a group of sites in Central Greece with important post-palatial occupation, such as Mitrou (settlement), Kalapodi (sanctuary), and Elateia (cemetery). Additionally, artifacts uncovered from the many cemeteries in the area show evidence for trade with Cyprus and the Levant.

=== Iron II ===
==== Geometric period ====
The village of Lefkandi in Euboea is considered one of the most representative sites of the Early Protogeometric style.

==== Potential Heroon ====
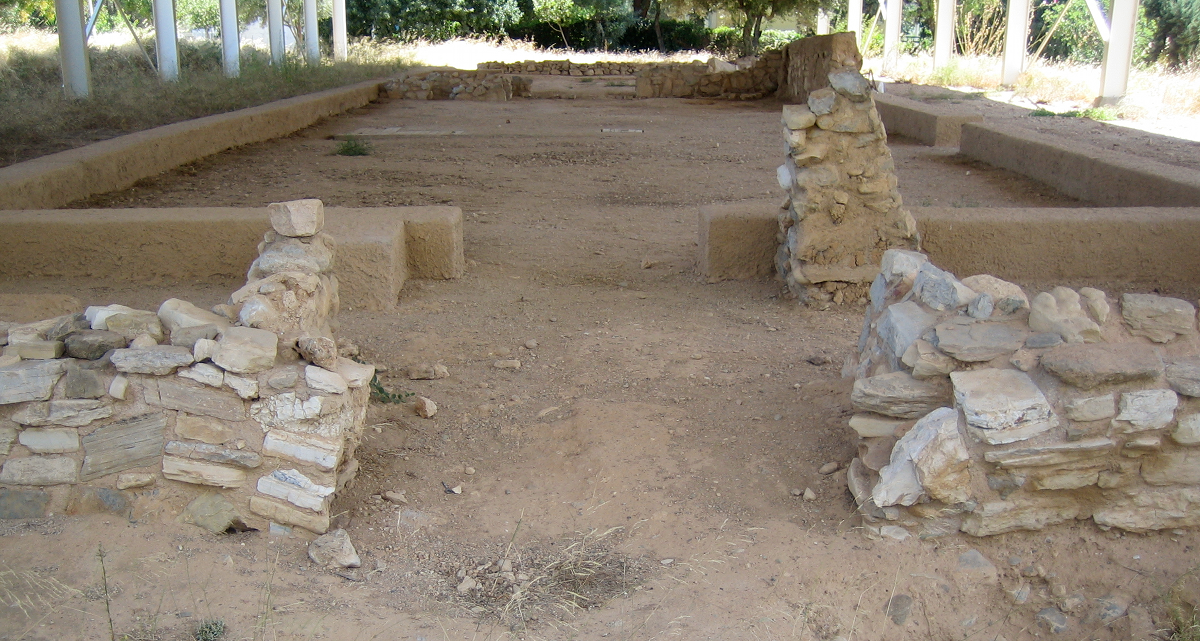
Heroon of Lefkandi, as seen from the main door.

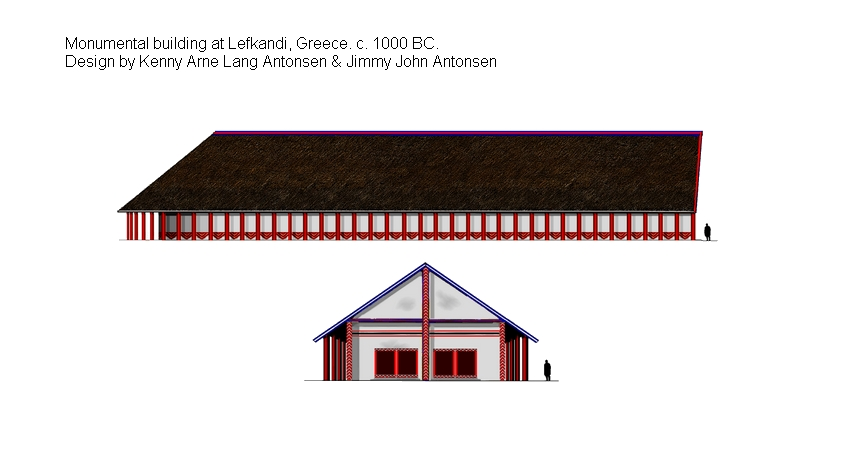
Reconstruction, heroon of Lefkandi c. 1000 BCE.

The archaeological significance of the site was revealed in 1980, in excavations conducted by Evi Touloupa in collaboration with the British School at Athens, when a large mound was discovered to contain two shaft graves. One grave held the remains of a man and a woman under a large structure called by some a hērōön (ἡρῷον) or "hero's grave." The other grave held four horses which appear to have been sacrificed and were included in the grave. Two of the horses were found with iron bits still in their mouths. There is some dispute as to whether the structure was truly a hērōön built to commemorate a hero, or whether it was instead the grave of a couple who were locally important for other reasons.

There are different theories of how the building was constructed. The older and structurally questionable version of this monumental building, built c. 950 BCE, envisages it to be 50 meters long and 13.8 meters wide. The main feature of this solution is with a wooden verandah, foreshadowing the peristasis of the temple architecture that started to appear with regularity some two centuries later. A structurally more probable solution is recently published in the annual of the British school at Athens, which reduces the height of the building and thus reducing the so-called veranda to a fence that surrounded the house.

One of the bodies in the grave had been cremated, the ashes being wrapped in a fringed linen cloth then stored in a bronze amphora from Cyprus. The amphora was engraved with a hunting scene and placed within a still larger bronze bowl. A sword and other grave goods were nearby. It is believed that the ashes were those of a man.

The woman's body was not cremated. Instead, she was buried alongside a wall and adorned with jewelry, including a ring of electrum, a bronze brazier, and a gorget believed to have come from Babylonia and have already been a thousand years old when it was buried. An iron knife with an ivory handle was found near her shoulder. It is unknown whether this woman was buried contemporaneously with the man's remains, or at a later date. Scholars have suggested that the woman was slaughtered to be buried with the man, who may have been her husband, in a practice reminiscent of the Indian custom of sati. Other scholars have pointed to the lack of conclusive evidence for her being sacrificed, suggesting instead that this woman may have been an important person in the community in her own right, who was interred with the man's ashes after her death.

=== Xeropolis ===
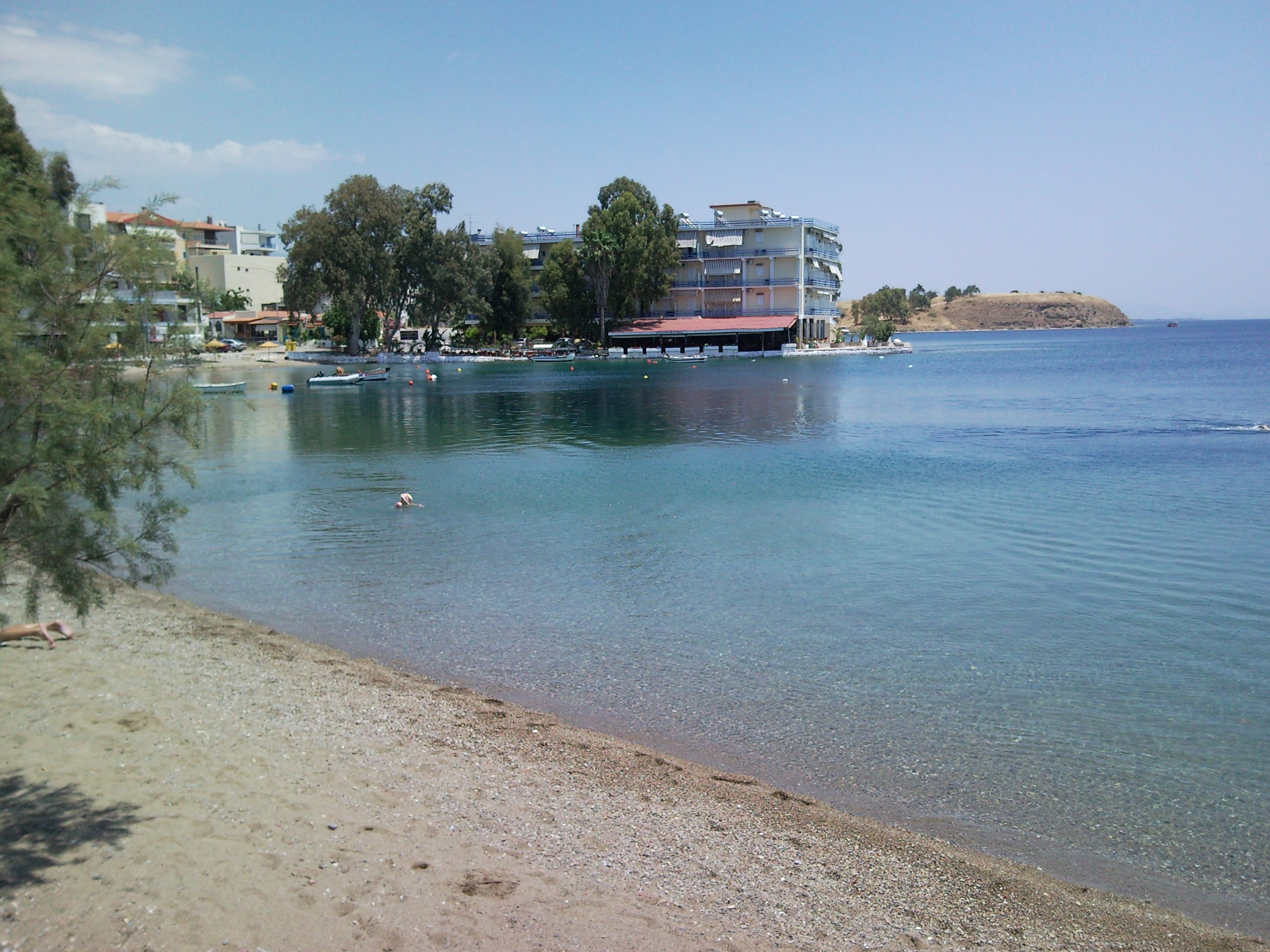
Xeropolis promontory

Archaeological research brought to light a settlement where continuous occupation can be demonstrated from the Mycenaean period through the Dark Ages and into historic times. It has been suggested by the excavators that the site can be identified as the old Eretria, which was forced to uproot and move farther from Chalkis as a result of the Lelantine War.

== Excavations ==
Excavation here is conducted under the direction of the British School at Athens and is ongoing as of 2015 (previous campaigns in 1964–1968, 1981–1984).
