= Argura (Euboea) =

Town of ancient Euboea

Argura (Ancient Greek: Ἄργουρα) also called Argyra (Ἀργυρᾶ) was a town of ancient Euboea near Chalkis, but its exact location is unknown. Modern scholars differ as to its location, with the current village of Lefkandi in the estuary of the Lilas River being identified by Denis Knoepfler Tritle places his remains on the hill of Vrachos in Vasiliko. The editors of the Barrington Atlas of the Greek and Roman World tentatively accept the Lefkandi location, as do the editors of the Digital Atlas of the Roman Empire (38°24′16″N 23°39′47″E).

Harpocration and Stephanus of Byzantium assert that the town had the status of a polis, but Hansen and Nielsen have found no evidence supporting the assertion.
