= Selemnos =

River in Greece

- Native name: Σέλεμνος (Greek)

Location
- Country: Greece

Physical characteristics
- Source
  - location: Panachaiko
- Mouth
  - location: Gulf of Corinth
  - coordinates: 38.3120°N 21.7921°E
- Length: approximately 20 km (12 mi)

Selemnos (Ancient Greek: Σέλεμνος, Latin: Selemnus) is a river in the northern part of Achaea, Greece. The river flows entirely in the municipal unit of Rio and empties into the Gulf of Corinth.

== Geography ==
The river begins on the northwest side of the Panachaiko mountain. It passes along the villages Ano Kastritsi and Kato Kastritsi. It empties into the Gulf of Corinth, east of the Rio-Antirrio bridge. The lower course of the river is also called Kastritsianiko (Καστριτσιάνικο).

== Mythology ==
In Greek mythology, Selemnus was a shepherd who loved the nymph Argyra, who eventually abandoned him and Selemnus died of grief. That time, the goddess Aphrodite made him a river, the waters of which were believed to cure of unrequited love.

The story of Selemnus is referenced in a tale by Rena Galanaki in Mnimi tou erota, lithi tou erota (Μνήμη του έρωτα, λήθη του έρωτα) in the book Ena schedon galazio cheri (Ένα σχεδόν γαλάζιο χέρι) (Kastaniotis, 2004) and one poem Sto Kastritsianiko potami (Στο Καστριτσιάνικο ποτάμι = By The Kastritsianiko River) by Thodoris Gkonia and Nikos Xydakis.
