= Psathopyrgos =

Psathopyrgos Ψαθόπυργος
- Community
- Location within Greece
- Coordinates: 38°20′N 21°52′E
- Country: Greece
- Administrative region: West Greece
- Regional unit: Achaea
- Municipality: Patras
- Municipal unit: Rio
- Elevation: 5 m (16 ft)

Population (2021)
  - Community: 752
- Time zone: UTC+2 (EET)
  - Summer (DST): UTC+3 (EEST)
- Postal code: 265 04
- Area code: 261
- Vehicle registration: AX, AZ

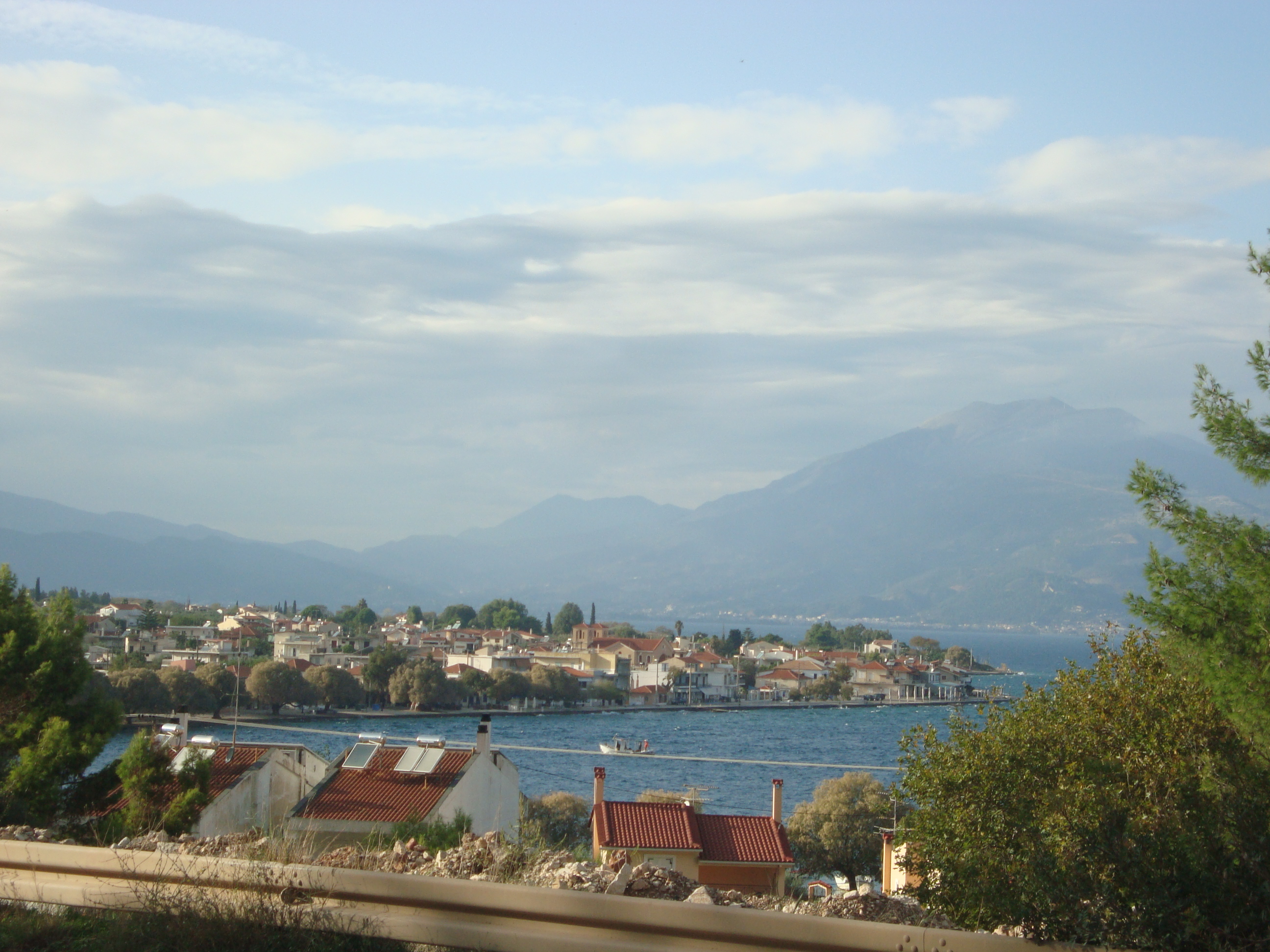
Psathopyrgos village in Achaia

Psathopyrgos (Greek: Ψαθόπυργος) is a tourist village and community in the municipal unit of Rio in the northern part of Achaea, Greece. Psathopyrgos is located on the Gulf of Corinth, south east of Cape Drepano, the northernmost point of the Peloponnese peninsula. The village has a small pebble beach and it is known to the locals and tourists for its fish taverns and nice views of the green mountains south of the village.

It is located 2 km north east of Drepano and 9 km north east of Rio. The Greek National Road 8A (Patras - Aigio - Corinth) pass south of the village. In the new railway line Athens-Corinth-Patras, which is currently under construction (June 2018), a railway stop is planned. The community Psathopyrgos consists of the villages Psathopyrgos and Kato Rodini.

== Historical population ==
Year	Population village	Population community
1981	479	-
1991	550	669
2001	670	834
2011	663	796
2021	640	752

== See also ==
- List of settlements in Achaea
