= Arba (Achaea) =

Map of ancient Achaea (with place names in Greek)

Arba (Ancient Greek: Άρβα) was a settlement somewhere in northern Achaea, Ancient Greece. Pausanias mentioned it was a refuge for Patrinos during the Achaean War.
