= Kato Kastritsi =

Kato Kastritsi Κάτω Καστρίτσι
- Community
- Location within Greece
- Coordinates: 38°17′N 21°48′E
- Country: Greece
- Administrative region: West Greece
- Regional unit: Achaea
- Municipality: Patras
- Municipal unit: Rio
- Elevation: 96 m (315 ft)

Population (2021)
  - Community: 798
- Time zone: UTC+2 (EET)
  - Summer (DST): UTC+3 (EEST)
- Postal code: 265 00
- Area code: 2160
- Vehicle registration: AX

Kato Kastritsi (Greek: Κάτω Καστρίτσι) is a village and a community in the municipal unit of Rio, Achaea, Greece. The community consists of the villages Kato Kastritsi and Magoula. It is situated at about 100 m elevation in the northwestern foothills of the Panachaiko, 2 km southeast of Rio town centre, and adjacent to the campus of the University of Patras. Ano Kastritsi is 4 km to the southeast.

== Historical population ==
Year	Population village	Population community
1981	-	518
1991	380	677
2001	514	712
2011	758	1,046
2021	545	798

== See also ==
- List of settlements in Achaea
