= Bolina (Achaea) =

Ancient city in Achaea, Greece

Map of ancient Achaea (with place names in Greek)

Bolina (Βολίνα) or Boline (Βολίνη) was an ancient city in Achaea, Greece. The city, already ruined when Pausanias visited it in the 2nd century AD, was located near cape Drepanum, near the river Bolinaeus. The name originates from the maiden Bolina, who fled to the sea here and threw herself into it, and by the favour of Apollo became an immortal. Bolina was one of the places where the Patreans took refuge after the defeat of the Achaean League by the Romans.
