= Platani, Achaea =

Platani Πλατάνι
- Community
- Location within Greece
- Coordinates: 38°18′N 21°49′E
- Country: Greece
- Administrative region: West Greece
- Regional unit: Achaea
- Municipality: Patras
- Municipal unit: Rio

Population (2021)
  - Community: 459
- Time zone: UTC+2 (EET)
  - Summer (DST): UTC+3 (EEST)
- Vehicle registration: AX

Platani (Greek: Πλατάνι) is a village in the municipal unit of Rio, Achaea, Greece. It is situated in the northern foothills of the Panachaiko mountain. It is 4 km east of Rio, and 2 km south of Agios Vasileios.

== Population ==
Year	Population
1981	235
1991	370
2001	460
2011	481
2021	459

== See also ==
- List of settlements in Achaea
