= Antheia (Achaea) =

Town in ancient Achaea

Antheia or Anthea (Ancient Greek: Ἄνθεια) was a town in ancient Achaea, which was said to have been depopulated by the mythical Patreus to populate Patrae. During the war between the Achaeans and the Romans, Patrae suffered so severely, that the greater part of the inhabitants abandoned the city and took up abodes in the surrounding villages, including Antheia. Here, Demeter Poteriophoros was worshiped.

According to Greek mythology, Antheia was founded by Eumelos, the native king of Aegialis, and King of Arous.

Map of ancient Achaea (with place names in Greek)
