= Argyros =

Argyros (Ancient Greek: Ἀργυρός, from the Greek word for "silver"), Latinized as Argyrus, can refer to:

- Argyros (Byzantine family), prominent Byzantine noble clan
- Argyrus (Catepan of Italy) (c. 1000–1068), Byzantine general of Lombard origin
- Isaac Argyros (born about 1312), Byzantine mathematician
- Billy Argyros, Greek-Australian professional poker player
- George Argyros (born 1937), Greek-American ambassador and businessman
- The fictional character Basil Argyros

== See also ==
- Argyropoulos
