= Rio, Greece =

Suburb of Patras, Greece

Rio Ρίο
- Municipal unit
- Location within the regional unit

- Location within Greece
- Coordinates: 38°18′05″N 21°46′55″E
- Country: Greece
- Administrative region: Western Greece
- Regional unit: Achaea
- Municipality: Patras

Area
  - Municipal unit: 98.983 km^{2} (38.218 sq mi)
- Elevation: 40 m (130 ft)

Population (2021)
  - Municipal unit: 14,219
  - Municipal unit density: 143.65/km^{2} (372.05/sq mi)
  - Community: 5,430
- Time zone: UTC+2 (EET)
  - Summer (DST): UTC+3 (EEST)
- Postal code: 265 xx
- Area code: 2610
- Vehicle registration: ΑΧ

Rio (Greek: Ρίο, Río, formerly Ῥίον, Rhíon; Latin: Rhium) is a town in the suburbs of Patras and a former municipality in Achaea, Western Greece, Greece. Since the 2011 local government reform it is part of the municipality Patras, of which it is a municipal unit. The municipal unit has an area of 98.983 km^{2}. The municipal unit had a population of 14,219 in 2021. The campus of the University of Patras and the Casino Rio is located in Rio.

== Geography ==
Rion is the northernmost municipal unit of the Peloponnese peninsula. It stretches along the southeastern coast of the Gulf of Patras, about 7 km northeast of Patras city centre. The nearby Strait of Rio, crossed by the Rio–Antirrio bridge, separates the Gulf of Patras from the Gulf of Corinth to the east. The town is dominated by the Panachaiko mountain to the southeast.

== Town layout ==
The town centre is also known as Agios Georgios Riou. This is where the Rio railway station, on the line from Patras to Corinth, is located. The quarter Kastellokampos lies to the southwest of the centre. The ferry terminals, with services to Antirrio, are in the north, on both sides of the Rio–Antirrio bridge. There is a large fortress with bastions next to the bridge. The campus of the University of Patras and the hospital lie in the southeast, across the Greek National Road 8A. There are sandy beaches along the coast, and a port north of town centre.

=== Subdivisions ===
The municipal unit Rio is subdivided into the following communities (constituent villages in brackets):

- Agios Vasileios
- Aktaio
- Ano Kastritsi
- Arachovitika (Arachovitika, Kato Arachovitika)
- Argyra
- Drepano
- Kato Kastritsi (Kato Kastritsi, Magoula)
- Pititsa
- Platani
- Psathopyrgos (Psathopyrgos, Kato Rodini)
- Rio
- Sella

== History ==
The name Rio (and its older form Rhion) derives from the Greek ῥίον (rhion), generally meaning "jutting part", perhaps from ῥίς (rhis), meaning "nose", but also "spur of land". The earliest attested form of the word is the Mycenaean Greek 𐀪𐀍, ri-jo, written in Linear B syllabic script.

The site of Rio has been a strategic point since antiquity. Early 19th century, there stood an old Turkish castle (the "Castle of the Morea") at the cape, with a small settlement outside its walls.

== Government ==
The mayors of the municipality were:

- Vasileios Zervas (1998–2006)
- Christos Liakopoulos (2006–2010)

== Population ==
Year	Municipal district	Municipality
1981	2,012	-
1991	3,496	10,280
2001	5,231	13,291
2011	5,252	14,622
2021	5,430	14,219

== Transport ==
=== Road ===
Rio is served by the A5 and A8 motorways, and the EO5 and EO8 roads: the A5 leads to Ioannina in the north and Pyrgos in the west, while the A8 leads to Corinth and Athens in the east; the EO8 also leads to Athens in the east and central Patras in the west, while the EO5 connects the EO8 with the Rio–Antirrio ferry, which still operates for non-motorway traffic.

The town is served by urban transport buses with lines 6 and 9 and the Patras Suburban Railway, via the "Rio" stop & the " Kastellokampos - University/Hospital" bus line .

=== Rail ===
Rio Railway Station, opened as a station in 1887 and since 2010 served by the local trains to Agios Andreas and Patras by Suburban Railway of Patras. Rio Station is currently under reconstruction as part of the construction of the new Athens-Patras railway line, which (when finished) will connect the area with Athens. In order to ensure these needs, a new temporary station has been operating since 26 March 2019, at the height of Zaimi & Iroon Polytechneiou streets.

== Gallery ==
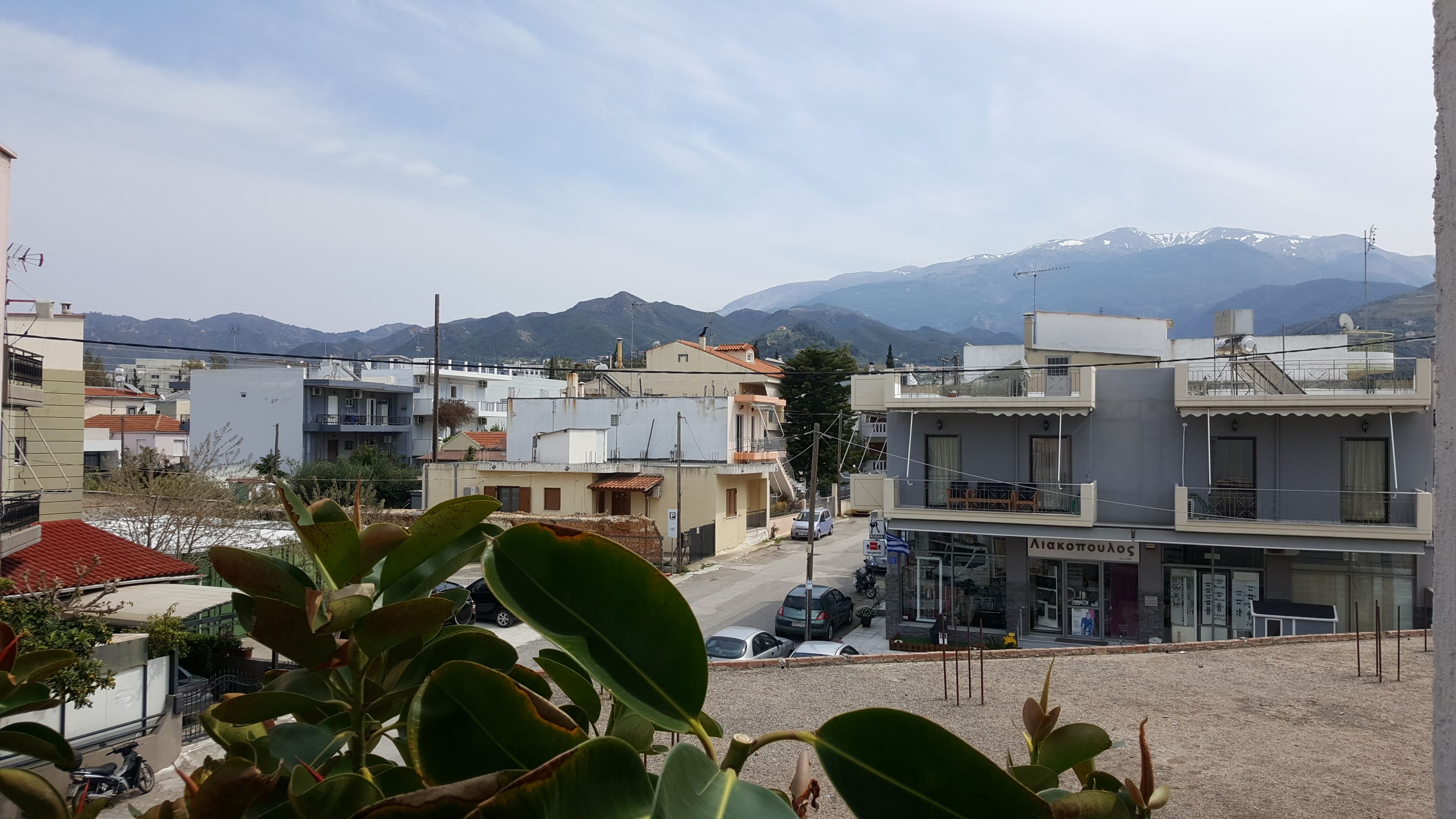
Neighborhood and Panachaiko mountain

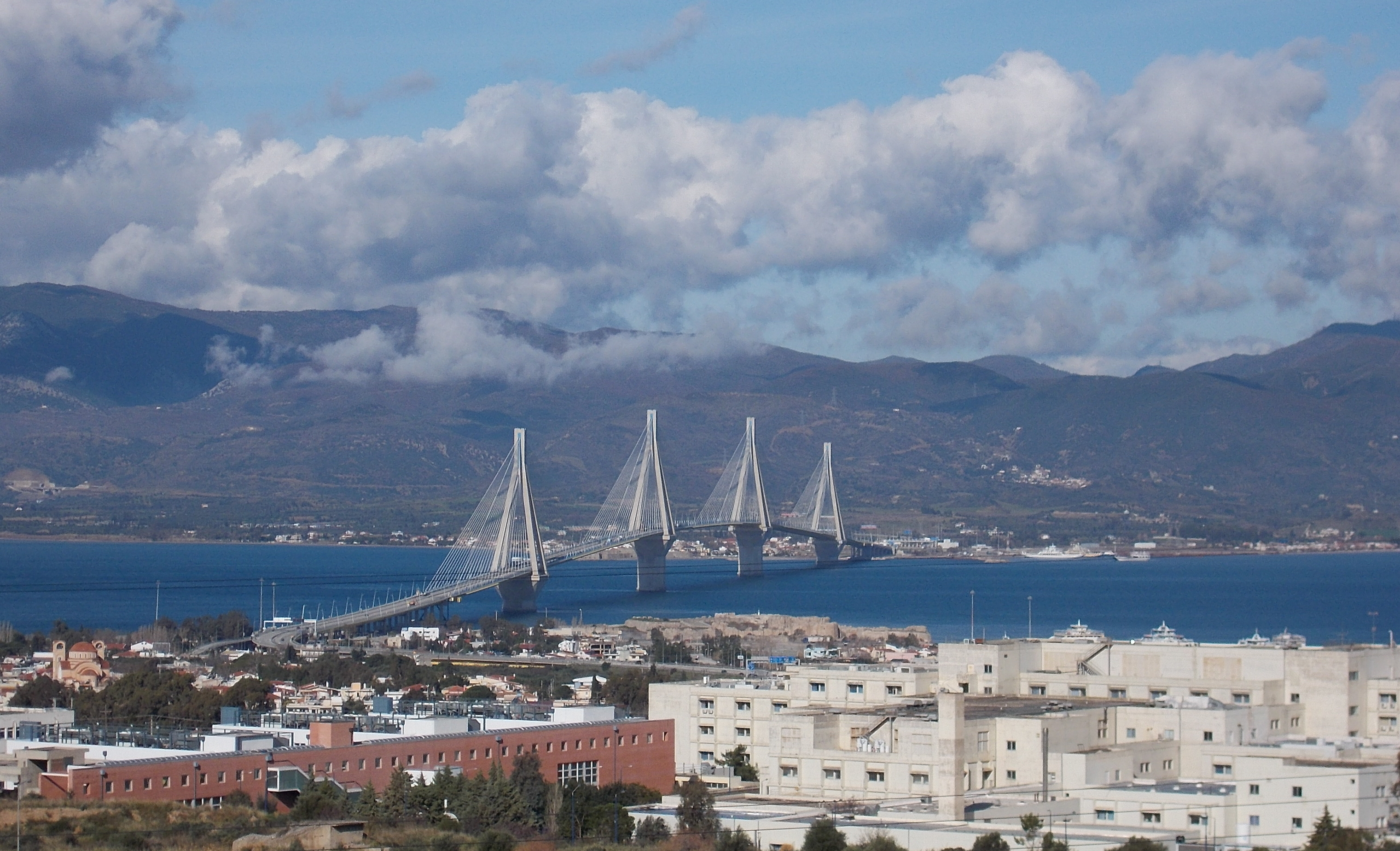
Hospital and bridge

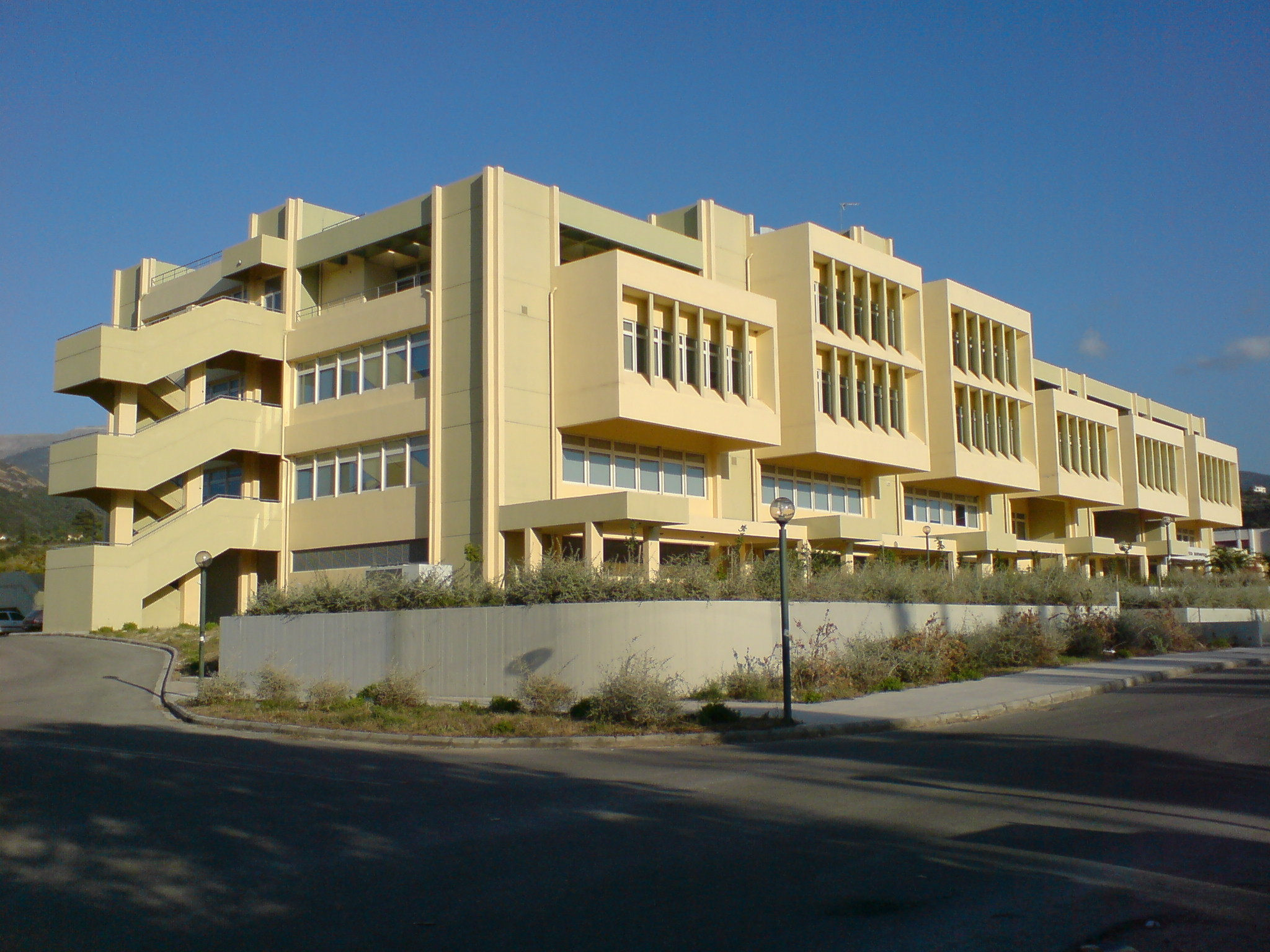
University library

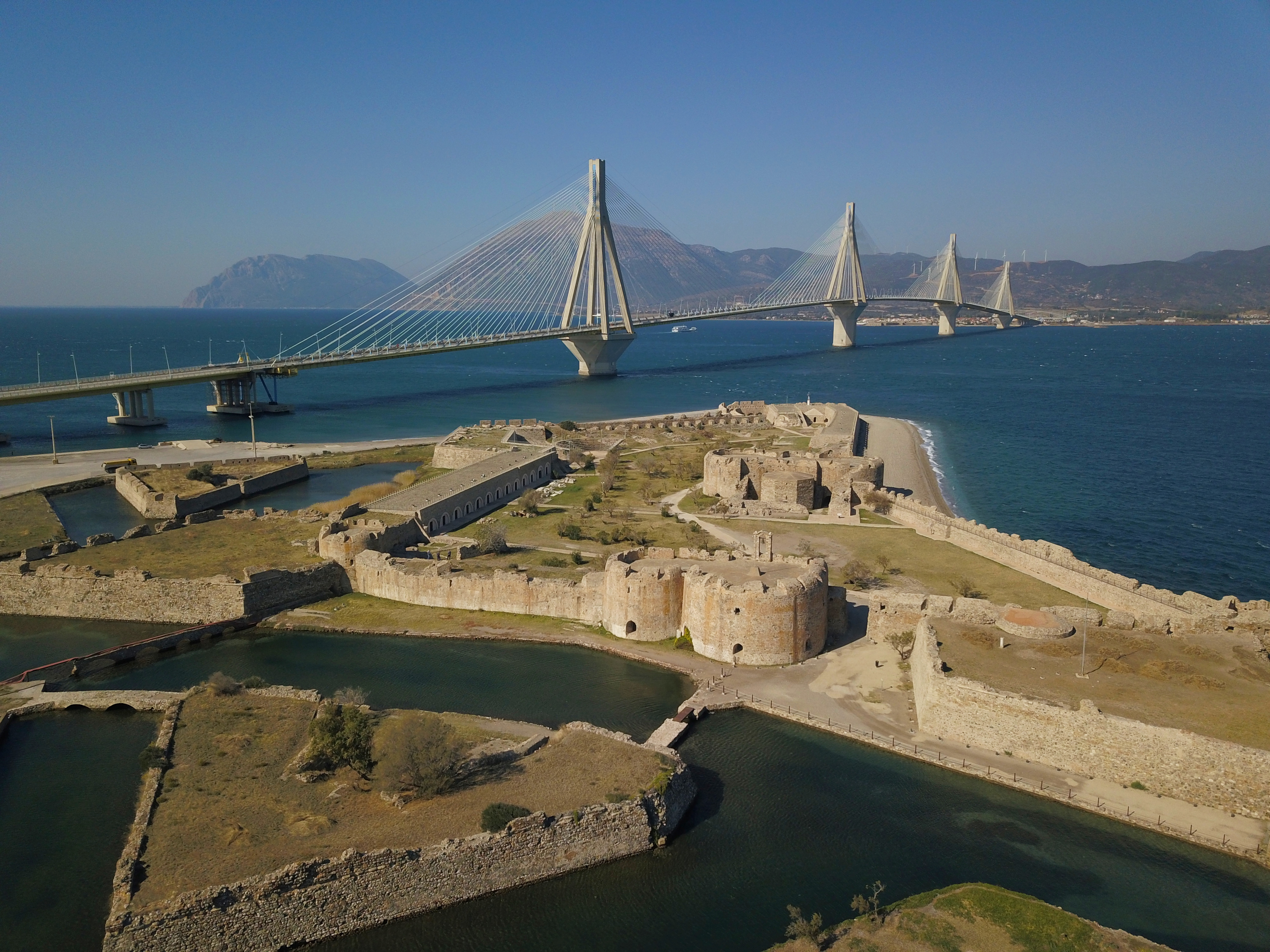
Castle

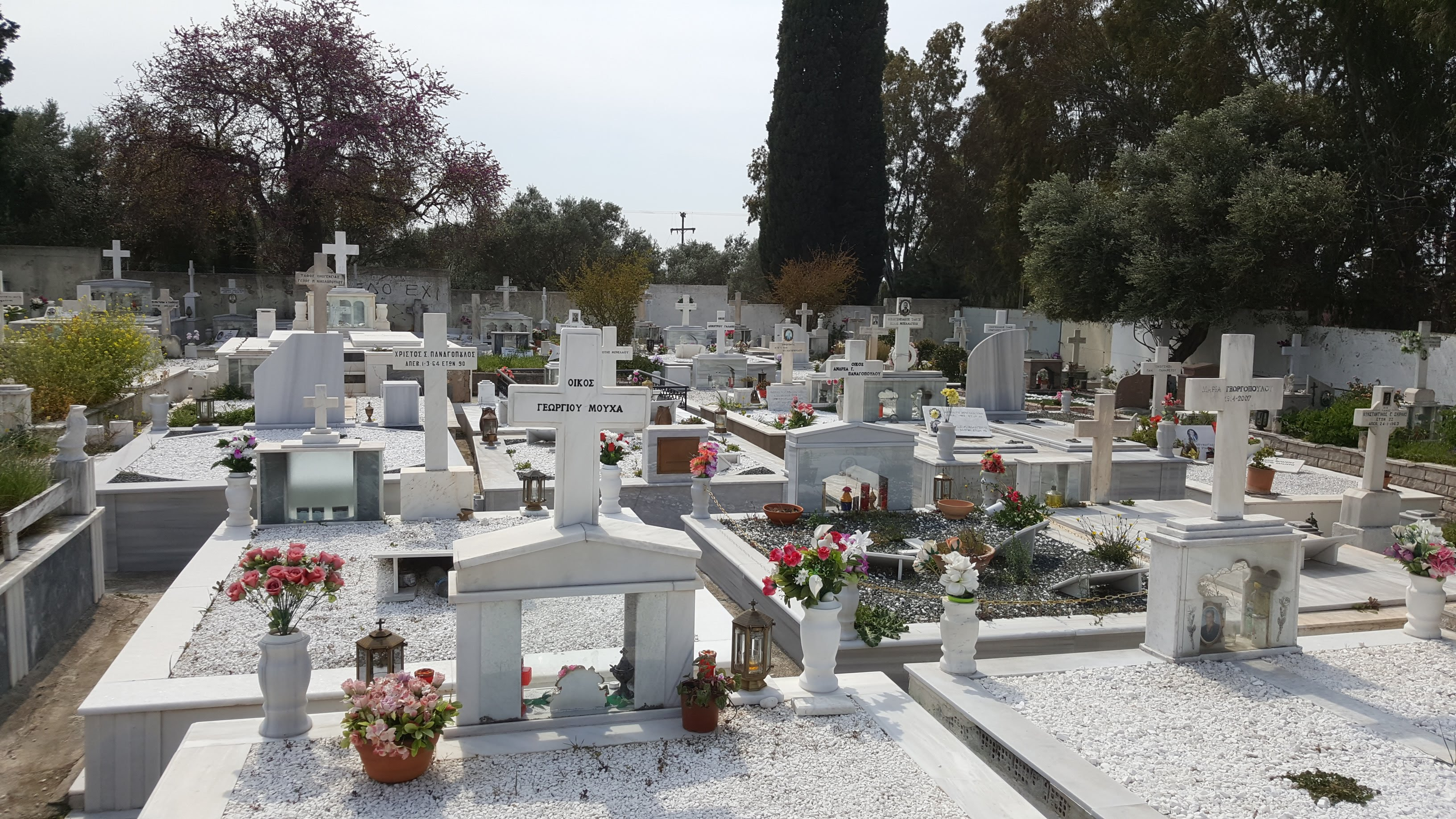
Cemetery

== See also ==
- List of settlements in Achaea
