= Argyra (mythology) =

Mythological Geek nymph

In Greek mythology, Argyra (/ˈɑːrdʒɪrə/; Ancient Greek: Ἀργυρᾶ, romanized: Argurã, lit. 'silvery') was one of the Naiads, a nymph who lived in a well. There was a city in ancient Achaea, also named Argyra, that was the site of a spring.

== Mythology ==
According to legend, the nymph Argyra was in love with a shepherd named Selemnus whom she visited frequently. But when he aged and his youthful beauty vanished, she forsook him. When the boy died of grief, the goddess Aphrodite out of pity changed him into a river, the Selemnos. There was a popular belief in Achaia that a forsaken lover who bathes in this river will forget their pain.
