= Drepano, Achaea =

Drepano Δρέπανο
- Community
- Location within Greece
- Coordinates: 38°19′N 21°51′E
- Country: Greece
- Administrative region: West Greece
- Regional unit: Achaea
- Municipality: Patras
- Municipal unit: Rio
- Elevation: 70 m (230 ft)

Population (2021)
  - Community: 451
- Time zone: UTC+2 (EET)
  - Summer (DST): UTC+3 (EEST)
- Postal code: 265 00
- Vehicle registration: AX

Drepano (Greek: Δρέπανο) is a village in the municipality of Patras, Achaea, Greece. It is situated on the river Volinaios, about 60 m above sea level. It is 2 km west of Psathopyrgos and 7 km northwest of Rio. The Greek National Road 8A (Athens – Corinth – Patras) passes north of the village.

== Population ==
Year	Population
1981	461
1991	601
2001	557
2011	541
2021	451

== See also ==
- List of settlements in Achaea
