= Ano Kastritsi =

Ano Kastritsi Άνω Καστρίτσι
- Community
- Location within Greece
- Coordinates: 38°16′N 21°50′E
- Country: Greece
- Administrative region: West Greece
- Regional unit: Achaea
- Municipality: Patras
- Municipal unit: Rio
- Elevation: 500 m (1,600 ft)

Population (2021)
  - Community: 745
- Time zone: UTC+2 (EET)
  - Summer (DST): UTC+3 (EEST)
- Postal code: 265 00
- Area code: 2160
- Vehicle registration: AX

Ano Kastritsi (Greek: Άνω Καστρίτσι) is a village in the municipal unit of Rio, Achaea, Greece. It is situated at about 500 m elevation in the forested northwestern foothills of the Panachaiko, 6 km southeast of Rio town centre, Kato Kastritsi is 4 km to the northwest. It is known for the views to the east part of Patras, the Corinthian Gulf, the Rio-Antirio Bridge, and for its taverns and food.

== Historical population ==
Year	Population
1981	691
1991	764
2001	931
2011	832
2021	745

== See also ==
- List of settlements in Achaea
