= Arcadian Cults of the Mistresses =

Ancient cults of Arcadia

The Arcadian Cults of the Mistresses are ancient cults that were practised in the region of Arcadia (or Arkadia). Religious cults across Greece took on regional characteristics according to their location. As such, though the Arcadian Mistresses, Demeter and Kore, were worshipped elsewhere in Greece, their worship in Arcadia was distinctive to the region, with the third Arcadian Mistress, Despoina, being a goddess whose cults were geographically limited to Arcadia.

== The Mistresses ==
=== Black Demeter ===
The worship of Demeter is well attested across Arcadia, through various epithets and sanctuaries. One particularly distinctive epithet she bore was Demeter Melaina (Ancient Greek: Δημητηρ Μελαινα), meaning “Black Demeter” and referring to an Arcadian version of her mythology. The ancient Greek travel writer Pausanias records a myth where, whilst searching for her lost daughter Kore, Demeter was pursued by the god Poseidon. Attempting to evade his violent intentions, Demeter took the form of a mare; Poseidon then transformed into a stallion and assaulted the goddess. Following this event, Demeter dressed herself all in black and withdrew into a cave to mourn her succession of misfortunes:

“angry with Poseidon and grieved at the abduction of Persephone, she put on black apparel and shut herself up in this cavern for a long time.”

Similar to the myth recorded elsewhere (such as the Homeric Hymn to Demeter), Pausanias recounts how the earth perished for the duration of Demeter's stay in the cave. Eventually she was discovered by the Arcadian god Pan, who reported her location to Zeus and sent the Fates to convince her to restore the earth's fertility.

As a result of the encounter above, the Arcadian cults believed that Demeter gave birth to a second daughter, and a son: Arion (Ancient Greek: Ἀρίων), a divine horse, and Despoina (Ancient Greek: Δεσποινη), whose name means “the Mistress”. Although the veneration of Demeter is clearly attestable throughout Arcadia, scholars such as Madeleine Jost have argued that her daughters Kore and Despoina (especially the latter) took precedence.

=== Kore and Despoina ===
According to ancient Greek mythology, Kore (Ancient Greek: κόρη), whose name translates to "Maiden", was the first born daughter of Demeter. Following the abduction of Kore by the Underworld God, Hades, Demeter went in desperate search for her lost daughter, who would later come to be known as Persephone (Ancient Greek: Περσεφονη). In Arcadia, however, it appears to have been more common to refer to this daughter of Demeter as Kore or through various other epithets.

According to the Arcadian version of Demeter's mythology, whilst Demeter was searching for Kore she was assaulted by Poseidon, resulting in the birth of her second-born daughter Despoina (as well as a son named Arion). Kore and Despoina were known together with their mother Demeter as Despoinai, "the Mistresses", or Megalai Theai, "Great Goddesses". Sometimes Demeter's daughters are conflated by ancient and modern writers; however, Arcadian cults infer that there was a clear a differentiation. Pausanias, for example, explains:

“whereas the real name of the Maid [Kore] is Persephone, as Homer and Pamphos before him say in their poems, the real name of the Mistress [Despoina] I am afraid to write to the uninitiated.”

This indicates that Despoina's true name was restricted to those initiated into the Arcadian mystery cults and thus eludes scholars today.

Pausanias claims that Despoina was worshipped more than any other deity by the Arcadians, making her a significant figure in the region's religious history. The first written record of her name dates to the closing of the third century BCE at her sanctuary in Lykosura; outside of Arcadia Despoina's name only appears after the Hellenistic period.

Unlike her sister Kore, Despoina does not appear to have been associated with agriculture and the seasons; instead, what little is known about points towards an affiliation with animals. For example, iconography survives depicting cult participants wearing animal masks or images of misanthropic beings performing cult activities. This association marks Despoina as more similar to Artemis, the goddess of the hunt and wilderness, who accompanies her in iconography from Lykosura; furthermore, Despoina's name appears in the Arcadian sanctuary of Artemis Lykoatis in Lykoa. In the 1980s Loucas posoted that Despoina's secret name and identity was in fact that of Artemis, although others have contested this idea since.

According to Pausanias, deer were especially sacred to Despoina.

Animals would be sacrificed to Despoina, although rather than having their throat cut (as was customary in many ancient Greek cults), limbs were severed from torsos.

== Arcadian Sanctuaries of the Mistresses ==
Though surviving literature (especially from Pausanias) makes reference to a number of sacred places and icons relating to the Arcadian cults of the Mistresses, many do not survive in the archaeological record. A selection of those that do are provided below.

=== Agios Sostis ===
Amidst the village of Agios Sostis is the (now obscured) remains of the sanctuary of Demeter (Thesmophorio), dating to the 7th-3rd centuries BCE. Here, Demeter and Kore were known by the epithet, Karapophoroi (Ancient Greek: Καρποφόροι), "Fruitbearers". Many cult artefacts and architectural fragments were found here during excavations in 1860 and 1910, some of which are exhibited in the Archaeological Museum of Tegea.

=== Lykosura ===
The remains of a very significant sanctuary dedicated to Despoina are located in Lykosura. This sanctuary was presumably important across Arcadia as it is the only one known to have been dedicated to Despoina, a goddess allegedly venerated by all Arcadians. Pausanias spends lot of time describing this site and his descriptions align well with the excavated archaeology. Three altars reside outside of the sanctuary, dedicated to Demeter, Despoina, and "the Great Mother". The sanctuary itself opens with a portico on the right decorated in white marble reliefs depicting the Fates, Zeus, Heracles, and Apollo; between these was a tablet detailing the mysteries of the sanctuary; additional reliefs depict various other deities and mythical figures. Cults statues in the form of Despoina and Demeter were crafted from stone (which now reside in the Archaeological Museum of Lykosura):

“Demeter carries a torch in her right hand; her other hand she has laid upon the Mistress. The Mistress has on her knees a staff and what is called the box, which she holds in her right hand.”

Archaeology belonging to the Lykosura sanctuary remain 10m below the Terzi ridge, facing eastward. Votive offerings and inscriptions have been uncovered attesting to Despoina's worship at the site.

=== Mantinea ===
Priestesses known as Koragoi would have hosted ceremonies on the thirtieth day of every month in the Mantinean sanctuary of Demeter and Kore, where they kept a holy fire burning at all times.

=== Megalopolis ===
Pausanias also reports that there was a sanctuary dedicated to the Great Goddesses, Demeter and Kore, located in Megalopolis, similar to Lykosura above, with additional distinctive features. He describes how the sanctuary was decorated with stone reliefs of Demeter and wooden images of Kore Soteira (Saviour), reaching up to fifteen feet, and table carved with depictions of the seasons, the god Pan, Apollo, and various other scenes. An enclosed grove of trees resides to the rear of the sanctuary, containing icons of the goddesses that cannot be seen.

=== Mount Elaius ===
According to Pausanias, there was a real cave in Arcadia, located upon Mount Elaius which was believed to be the place where Demeter sought refuge according to the Arcadian myth, making it sacred to Demeter Melaina. Allegedly inside this cave was a wooden image of Demeter which was later destroyed by fire:

“It was seated on a rock, like to a woman in all respects save the head. She had the head and hair of a horse, and there grew out of her head images of serpents and other beasts. Her tunic reached right to her feet; on one of her hands was a dolphin, on the other a dove.”

This imagery relates to the myth described above; it also relates her powers to Underworld (serpents), the sky (dove), and the sea (dolphin), in addition to her power over the earth. Unfortunately, the cave's location or reality has yet to be confirmed.

=== Tegea ===
Pausanias writes of sanctuaries in Tegea:

“There is also at Tegea a temple of Demeter and Kore (the Maiden), whom they surname Karpophoroi (the Fruit-bringers). . . Not far from it are two sanctuaries of Dionysos, an altar of Kore (the Maiden).” “Along the straight road [from Tegea in Arkadia to Argos] there are many oaks, and in the grove of oaks is a temple of Demeter called ‘in Korythenses’”

== Festivals and Mysteries ==
We read from Herodotus that there was a version of the Mysteries and their associated festivals, such as the Thesmophoria, which were practised by people in Arcadia - the only Peloponnesian region to celebrate the festival:

“The daughters of Danaus were those who brought this rite out of Egypt and taught it to the Pelasgian women; afterwards, when the people of the Peloponnese were driven out by the Dorians, it was lost, except in so far as it was preserved by the Arcadians, the Peloponnesian people which was not driven out but left in its home.”

=== Agios Sostis ===
Owing to the discovery of many cult artefacts, including figurines of water carriers (hydrophoroi) and women carrying pigs, it is likely that rituals of the Thesmophoria would have taken place at the sanctuary of Demeter in Agios Sostis. The sacrifice of piglets and the burial and retrieval of their decaying remains were a distinctive aspect of the Thesmophoria's proceedings.

=== Pheneos ===
The Mysteries of Pheneos provides an example of this which combined chthonic (underworld) and agrarian (agricultural) themes and claimed that the rituals performed in Eleusis originated from themselves - although this is contested by others. Describing the Greater Rites at Pheneos, Pausanias writes:

“Beside the sanctuary of Eleusinia has been set up Petroma, as it is called, consisting of two large stones fitted one to the other. When every other year they celebrate what they call the Greater Rites, they open these stones. They take from out them writings that refer to the rites, read them in the hearing of the initiated, and return them on the same night. Most Pheneatians, too, I know, take an oath by the Petroma in the most important affairs. On the top is a sphere, with a mask inside of Demeter Kidarie [or Cidaria]. This mask is put on by the priest at the Greater Rites...”

=== Mantinea ===
Festivals honouring the Mistresses took place in Mantinea. Pausanias describes a sanctuary located “after the ruins of Nestane”, and another dedicated to Demeter and Kore which held an annual festival named the Koragia. This festival involved processions, offerings, and secret rites hidden from view.

Pausanias reports that the mysteries of the Great Goddesses (or the Mistresses) took place every two years in Trapezus, with artefacts depicting Demeter and Kore found in the area attesting to this history.

== See also ==
- Arcadia
- Eleusinian Mysteries
- Demeter
- Despoina
- Persephone

== Bibliography ==
- Cronkite, Susan-Marie (1997) The Sanctuary of Demeter At Mytilene: A Diachronic and Contextual Study, vol. 2 Catalogue. University College London, https://discovery.ucl.ac.uk/id/eprint/1317638/2/263732_vol2.pdf
- Dillon, Matthew (2002) Girls and Women in Classical Greek Religion. London. Routledge
- Herodotus, Histories, Book 2
- Homeric Hymn to Demeter; trans. by Martin West. Harvard University Press.
- Jost, Madeleine (2007) 'The Religious System in Arcadia', in A Companion to Greek Religion, ed. by D. Ogden. John Wiley & Sons
- Kerenyi, Karl (1967) Eleusis. Archetypal image of mother and daughter. Princeton University Press
- Loucas, E. (1987–1988) 'Le nom de la Théa Despoina (Tatien, Ad Graec. 29 – Paus. VIII, 37, 6 et 9)', in Πρακτικά Γ’ διεθνούς συνεδρίου πελοποννησιακών σπουδών. Καλαμάτα, 8-15 Σεπτεμβρίου 1985 (Athens 1987–1988), 401–419
- Farnell, Lewis Richard (2010) The Cults of the Greek States. Cambridge University Press. Reissue edn
- Palamidis, Alaya (2018) 'The Sanctuary of Despoina at Lykosoura: A Megalopolitan Creation?', in Arkadien im Altertum / Ancient Arcadia: Geschichte und Kultur einer antiken Gebirgslandschaft / History and Culture of a Mountainous Region, ed. by Klaus Tausend. Graz: Unipress Verlag
- Pausanias, Description of Greece, Book 7 and 8
- Martin Nilsson (1967) Die Geschichte der Griechiesche Religion, vol. 1 . Berk
