= Kiveri =

Kiveri Κιβέρι
- Community
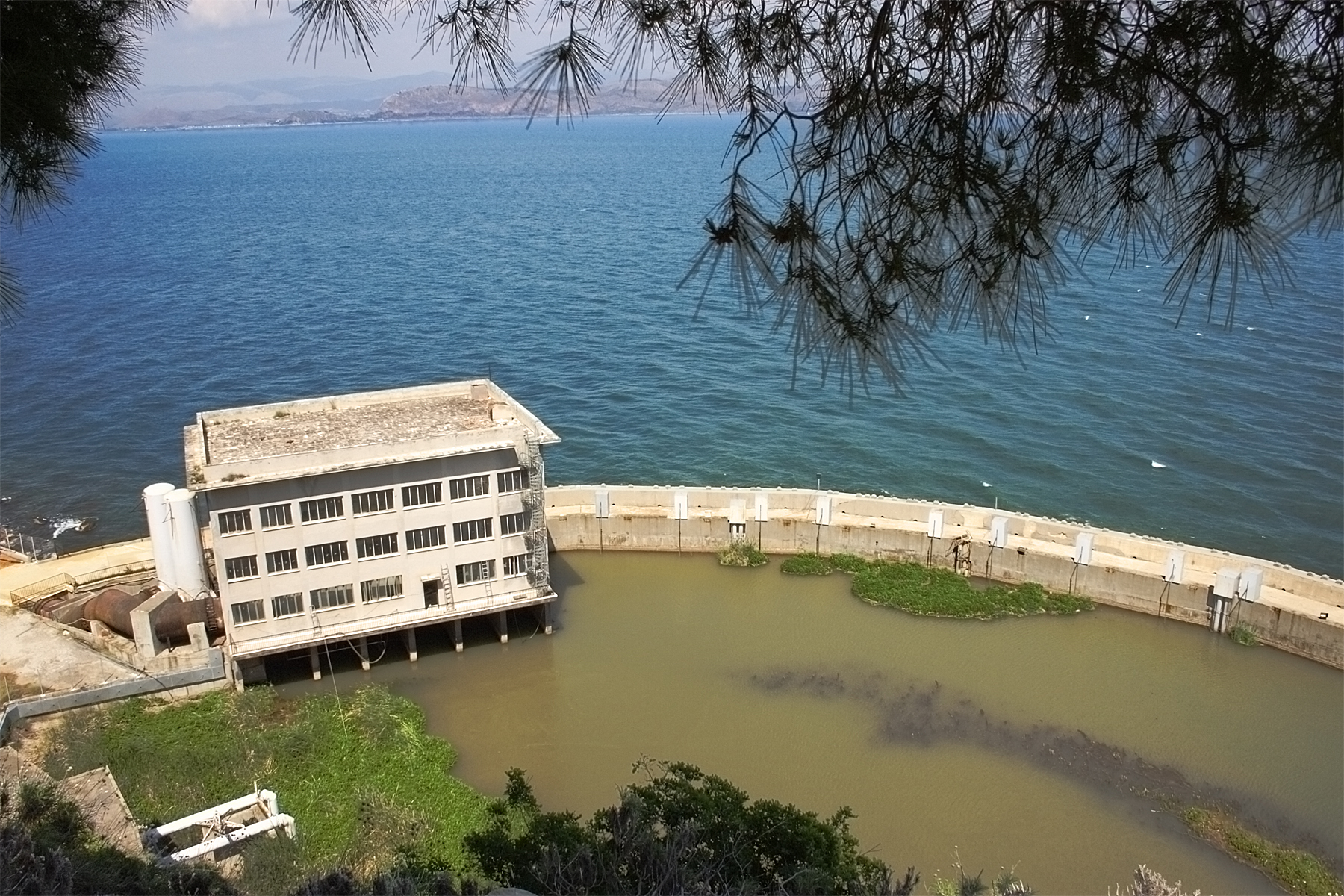
- Karst spring near Kiveri

- Location within Greece
- Coordinates: 37°31′28″N 22°43′48″E
- Country: Greece
- Administrative region: Peloponnese
- Regional unit: Argolis
- Municipality: Argos-Mykines
- Municipal unit: Lerna

Population (2021)
  - Community: 960
- Time zone: UTC+2 (EET)
  - Summer (DST): UTC+3 (EEST)

Kiveri (Greek: Κιβέρι) is a small village in the municipal unit of Lerna, Argolis, Greece. It is situated on the bay of Argos across from the tourist center of Nafplio. It has a population of approximately 1000. According to legend it was founded in 1600 BC by some of the first Dorian invaders of the Peloponnese. Scholarly research finds that the village has been continuously occupied since antiquity, its ancient name being Apovathmi. The recent unearthing of ancient graves (dates still to be determined) do lend at least a little credence to the legend. Kiveri has a predominantly agricultural economy revolving around the growth and distribution of oranges and olives. There is also a small fishing industry.

At the villages southern border, where Kiveri's Orchards of the rivers floodplain ends, a large submarine coastal Karst spring (Greek: Καρστική πηγή) was walled to catch the sweet water for irrigating its orchards and those of the very huge Coastal Plain of Argos. The sweet water (karst water) comes from Lake Stymphalia, from Argon Pedion (a stand-alone side-basin of Arcadia's big "Tripoli Basin" next to village Nestani) and from the "Kapsas Ponor" in the Tripoli Basin (one of ca. 40 ponors in the basin!). The water descends gradually through katavothres (Greek: καταβόθρές) and is drained subsurface through several hydrotectonic structures towards the spring.
