= Lycomedes (disambiguation) =

Lycomedes was the most prominent king of the Dolopians in the island of Scyros near Euboea during the Trojan War.

Lycomedes may also refer to:

- Lycomedes (mythology), the name of a number of mythological figures
- Lycomedes of Comana
- Lycomedes of Mantinea
- 9694 Lycomedes
- Lycomedes (beetle), a genus of Rhinocerus Beetle in subfamily Dynastinae
