= Nestane =

Coordinates: 37°36′58″N 22°27′41″E

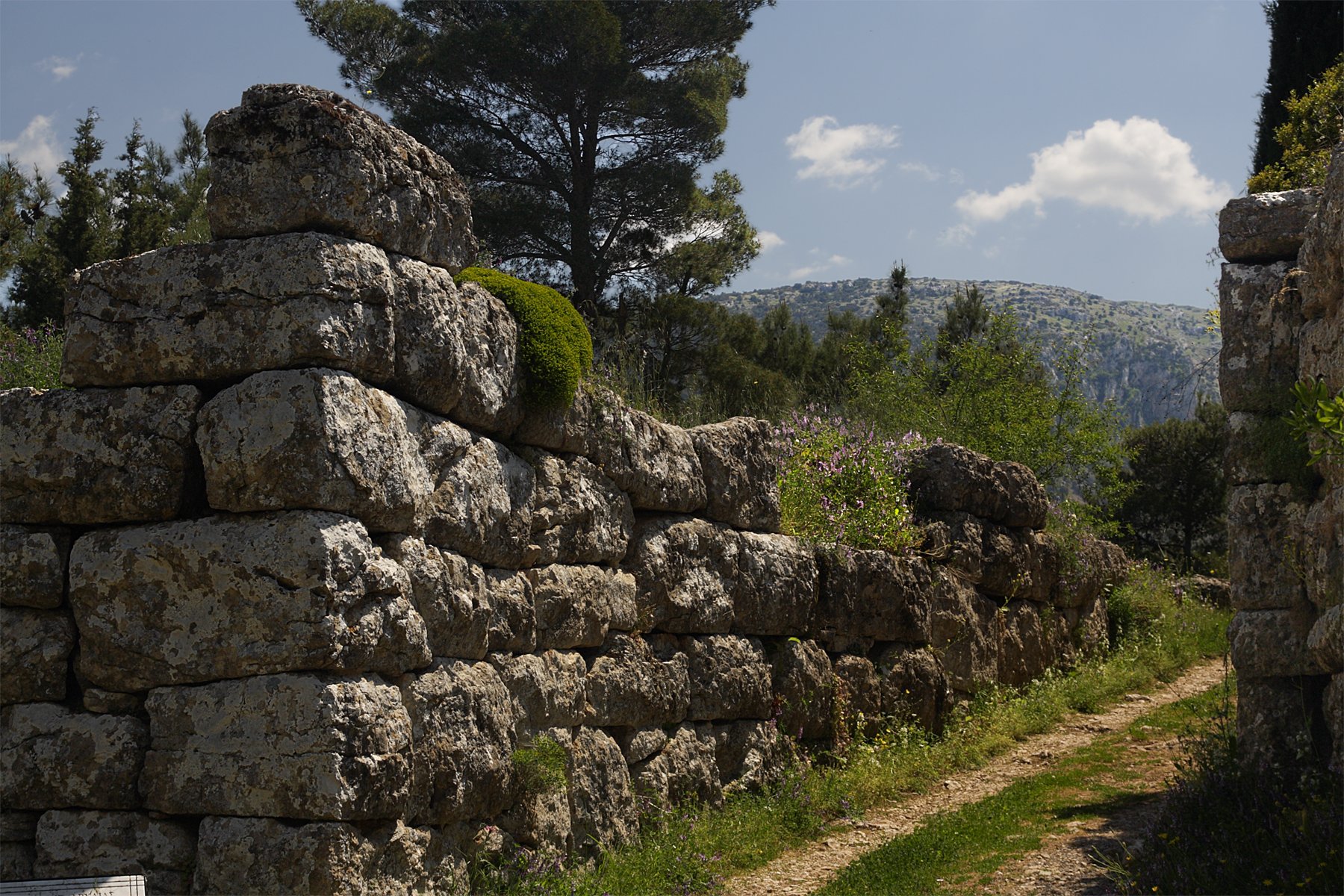
Rests of the ancient palace of Nestane. The palace controlled “Argon Pedion” and the most important entry to the Arcadian highlands

Nestane (Ancient Greek: Νεστάνη) was a town of ancient Arcadia. Nestane was the place where Philip II of Macedonia camped on an expedition, in the year 338 BCE, when he tried to attract the alliance of the Arcadians to separate them from the other Greeks. It was located on the side of a hill in a plain called "Argon Pedion" (untilled plain), and in the time of Pausanias (2nd century) the ruins of the town as well as those of Philip's tent were shown. Near the town there was a sanctuary of Demeter, where the inhabitants of Mantineia celebrated an annual feast.

Its site is associated with the modern village of Nestani. In this village there is a fountain called “Philip's Fountain” (Greek: Φιλίππειος Κρήνη).
