= Kapsas (disambiguation) =

Kapsas is a community in Greece

Kapsas may also refer to:

- Kapsas, a person of Kapsai ethnic subgroup of Lithuanians

== People with the surname ==
- Vincas Kapsas or Vincas Kudirka, a Lithuanian poet
