= Diagoras of Melos =

5th-century BCE Greek poet and sophist

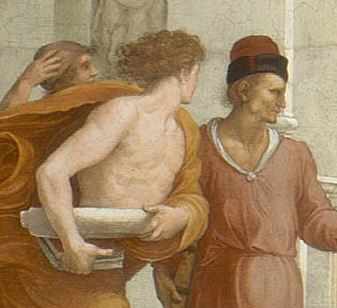
- Diagoras of Melos depicted in the 16th century painting The School of Athens by Raphael.
- Born: 5th century BCE; Melos
- Died: 5th century BCE; Corinth

Philosophical work
- Era: Ancient Greek philosophy
- Region: Western philosophy
- School: Sophists
- Main interests: Religious skepticism

Diagoras of Melos (Greek: Διαγόρας ὁ Μήλιος) or Diagoras "the Atheist" was a Greek poet and sophist of the 5th century BC. Throughout antiquity, he was regarded as an atheist, but very little is known for certain about what he actually believed. Anecdotes about his life indicate that he spoke out against ancient Greek religion. He allegedly chopped up a wooden statue of Heracles and used it to boil his turnips and revealed the secrets of the Eleusinian Mysteries. The Athenians accused him of asebeia (impiety) and banished him from their city. He died in Corinth.

== Life ==
Diagoras was the son of Telecleides or Teleclytus, and was born in the island of Melos, one of the Cyclades. According to the Suda, he was a disciple of Democritus after Democritus had paid 10,000 drachmas to free Diagoras from captivity following the cruel subjugation of Melos (416 BC); however no early sources mention an association with Democritus. The Suda also states that in his youth Diagoras had acquired some reputation as a lyric poet, and this is probably the cause of his being mentioned with the lyric poets Simonides, Pindar, and Bacchylides. Among his encomia is mentioned in particular a eulogy on Arianthes of Argos, who is otherwise unknown, another on Nicodorus, a statesman of Mantineia, and a third upon the Mantineians. Nicodorus was celebrated as a statesman and lawgiver in his native place; Aelian informs us that Diagoras was the lover of Nicodorus, and assisted Nicodorus in his legislation. The constitution of Mantineia was later praised by Aristotle and Polybius as a rare example of democratic moderation and equilibrium.

In his Clouds, the Athenian comic playwright Aristophanes alludes to Diagoras as a well-known figure of the time, with the second, extant version of this play probably falling around 419–417 BC. Diodorus informs us that a few years later, c. 415 BC, he was accused of impiety, and he thought it best to escape Athens to avoid prosecution, and classical sources speak of a reward for either catching or killing him. Religion may have been only the pretext for the accusation, for being a Melian made him an object of suspicion with the people of Athens. In 416 BC, Melos had been conquered and cruelly treated by the Athenians, and it is not at all impossible that Diagoras, indignant at such treatment, may have taken part in the party-strife at Athens, and thus have drawn upon himself the suspicion of the democratic party. Diagoras subsequently went to Corinth, where, as the Suda states, he died.

== Philosophy ==
Little is known for certain concerning his philosophical views or the nature of his alleged atheism. All that is known for certain on the point is that Diagoras was offended by the worship of the Athenian national gods.

=== Ancient anecdotes ===
Cicero, writing in the 1st century BC, tells of how a friend of Diagoras tried to convince him of the existence of the gods, by pointing out how many votive pictures tell about people being saved from storms at sea by "dint of vows to the gods", to which Diagoras replied that "there are nowhere any pictures of those who have been shipwrecked and drowned at sea." And Cicero goes on to give another example, where Diagoras was on a ship in hard weather, and the crew thought that they had brought it on themselves by taking this ungodly man on board. He then wondered if the other boats out in the same storm also had a Diagoras on board.

This and similar anecdotes accurately describe the relation in which he stood to the popular religion. That he maintained his own position with great firmness, and perhaps with more freedom, wit, and boldness than was advisable, seems to be attested by the fact that he in particular obtained the epithet of atheist in antiquity. It is possible that he merely denied the direct interference of gods with the world, but that, since he did not believe in the personal existence of the Athenian gods and their human mode of acting, the Athenians could hardly have regarded him as other than an atheist.

The Christian writer Athenagoras of Athens (2nd century AD) writes about Diagoras:

With reason did the Athenians adjudge Diagoras guilty of atheism, in that he not only divulged the Orphic doctrine, and published the mysteries of Eleusis and of the Cabiri, and chopped up the wooden statue of Hercules to boil his turnips, but openly declared that there was no God at all.

To return to the accusation against Diagoras which obliged him to quit Athens, the time was one in which scepticism was beginning to undermine the foundations of the ancient popular belief. The trial of those who had broken down the statues of Hermes, the profanation of the mysteries, and the accusation of Alcibiades, are symptoms which show that the unbelief, nourished by the speculations of philosophers and the sophists, began to appear very dangerous to the conservative party at Athens. There is no doubt that Diagoras paid no regard to the established religion of the people, and he may occasionally have ridiculed it; but he also ventured on direct attacks upon public institutions of the Athenian worship, such as the Eleusinian Mysteries, which he endeavoured to lower in public estimation, and he is said to have prevented many persons from becoming initiated in them. These at least are the points of which the ancients accuse him, and the historian Melanthius, in his work on the mysteries, mentions the decree passed against Diagoras. There were undoubtedly political motives in all these religious disputes. Diagoras was a Melian, and consequently belonged to the Dorian race; he was a friend of the Dorian Mantineia, which was hated by Athens, and had only recently given up its alliance with Athens; the Dorians and Ionians were opposed to each other in various points of their worship, and this spark of hostility was kindled into a growing hatred by the Peloponnesian War. Diagoras fled from Athens in time to escape the consequences of the attacks which his enemies had made upon him. He was therefore condemned, and the psephisma was engraved on a column, promising a prize for his head, and one talent to the person who should bring his dead body to Athens, and two talents to him who should deliver him up alive to the Athenians.

=== Modern appraisal ===
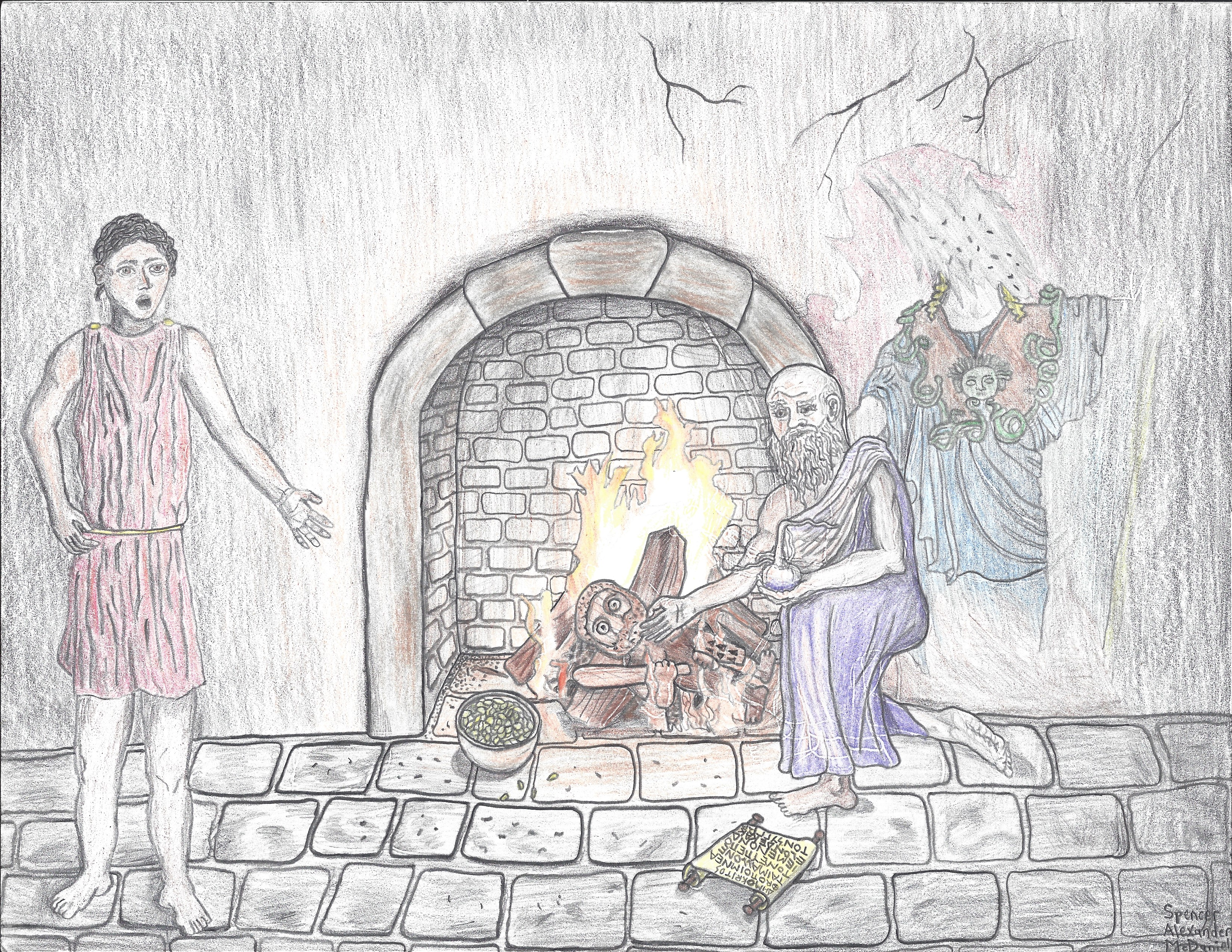
Pencil illustration drawn between 2018 and 2020 representing the artist's interpretation of the legend of Diagoras of Melos burning the statue of Herakles

J. M. Robertson writes on Diagoras that:

It was about that time [415 BC] that the poet Diagoras of Melos was proscribed for atheism, he having declared that the non-punishment of a certain act of iniquity proved that there were no gods. It has been surmised, with some reason, that the iniquity in question was the slaughter of the Melians by the Athenians in 416 B.C., and the Athenian resentment in that case was personal and political rather than religious. For some time after 415 the Athenian courts made strenuous efforts to punish every discoverable case of impiety; and parodies of the Eleusinian Mysteries were alleged against Alkibiades and others. Diagoras, who was further charged with divulging the Eleusinian and other mysteries, and with making firewood of an image of Herakles, telling the god thus to perform his thirteenth labour by cooking turnips, became thenceforth one of the proverbial atheists of the ancient world, and a reward of a silver talent was offered for killing him, and of two talents for his capture alive; despite which he seems to have escaped.

The relation of Diagoras to the popular religion and theology of his age can not be explained without going back to the opinions of the Natural philosophers, and the intellectual movement of the time. The Pre-Socratic philosophers had increasingly explained natural phenomena in terms of natural laws without the need for divine intervention. In particular, the atomism of Democritus had substituted for a world-governing god the relation of cause and effect as the sources of all things. Democritus explained the widespread belief in gods as the result of fear of unusual and unaccountable phenomena in nature; and, starting from this principle, Diagoras, at a time when the ancient popular belief had already been shaken, especially in the minds of the young, came forward with the doctrine that there were no gods at all. His attacks seem to have been mainly directed against the dogmas of Greek theology and mythology, as well as against the established forms of worship. According to the fashion of the sophists, which is caricatured by Aristophanes in The Clouds, he substituted the active powers of nature for the activity of the gods; and some isolated statements that have come down to us render it probable that he did this in a witty manner.

Jennifer Michael Hecht writes on Diagoras that:

The poet Diagoras of Melos was perhaps the most famous atheist of the fifth century. Although he did not write about atheism, anecdotes about his unbelief suggest he was self-confident, almost teasing, and very public. He revealed the secret rituals of the Eleusinian mystery religion to everyone and "thus made them ordinary," that is, he purposefully demystified a cherished secret rite, apparently to provoke his contemporaries into thought. In another famous story, a friend pointed out an expensive display of votive gifts and said, "You think the gods have no care for man? Why, you can see from all these votive pictures here how many people have escaped the fury of storms at sea by praying to the gods who have brought them safe to harbor." To which Diagoras replied, "Yes, indeed, but where are the pictures of all those who suffered shipwreck and perished in the waves?" A good question. Diagoras was indicted for profaning the mysteries, but escaped. A search was out for him throughout the Athenian empire, which indicated that the charges were serious, but he was not found.

== Editions ==
- Marek Winiarczyk (ed.), Diagorae Melii et Theodori Cyrenaei reliquiae, Leipzig, 1981 (Bibliotheca Scriptorum Graecorum et Romanorum Teubneriana).

== See also ==
- Theodorus the Atheist
