= Euphron =

Ancient Greek tyrant

Euphron was a tyrant of the ancient Greek city-state of Sicyon between 368 and 364 BC.

Euphron was a citizen of Sicyon, who held the chief power during the period of its subjection to Sparta. In 368 BC the city was compelled by Epaminondas to join the Theban alliance, and though its constitution appears to have remained unchanged, the influence of Euphron was considerably diminished. In order to regain it, he took advantage of the dissatisfaction of the Arcadians and Argives with the oligarchical line of Epaminondas, and representing to them that the supremacy of Lacedaemon would surely be restored in Sicyon if matters continued as they were, he succeeded in establishing democracy. In the election of generals which followed, he himself was chosen, with four colleagues. He then procured the appointment of his own son, Adeas, to the command of the mercenary troops in the service of the republic and he further attached these to his cause by an unsparing use, not only of the public money and the sacred treasures, but of the wealth also of many whom he drove into banishment on the charge of Laconism.

His next step was to rid himself of his colleagues and having effected this by the exile of some and the murder of the rest, he became tyrant of Sicyon. He was not, however, entirely independent, for the citadel was occupied by a Theban harmost, sent there, as it would seem, after the democratic revolution. We find Euphron co-operating with that officer in a campaign against Phlius, probably in 365 BC.

Not long after this, oligarchy was again established in Sicyon, by Aeneas of Stymphalus, the Arcadian general, and apparently with the concurrence of the Theban harmost. Euphron upon this fled to the harbour, and, having sent to Corinth for the Spartan commander Pasimelus, delivered it up to him, making many professions at the same time of having been influenced in all he had done by attachment to the interests of Lacedaemon, to which however little credit seems to have been given.

Meanwhile party-strife still continued at Sicyon, and so he was enabled, by help from Athens, to regain possession of the city. But he was aware that he could not hold it in the face of opposition from the Theban garrison (to say nothing of his having now decisively incurred the enmity of Sparta), and he therefore betook himself to Thebes, hoping to obtain, by corruption and intrigue, the banishment of his opponents and the restoration of his own power. Some of his enemies, however, followed him thither, and when they found that he was indeed advancing towards the attainment of his object, they murdered him in the Cadmea, while the council was actually assembled there. Being arrested and brought before the council, they pleaded their cause boldly, justified their deed, and were acquitted. But Euphron's partisans were numerous at Sicyon, and having brought home his body, they buried it in the Agora, an unusual honour (cfr. Plutarch, Aratus 53) and paid worship to him as a hero and a founder.

In 323 BC Euphron the Younger, son of Adeas and grandson of the tyrant Euphron, reintroduced democracy in Sicyon, but was soon conquered by the Macedonians.
