= Arcadian League =

League of city-states in ancient Greece

League of the Arcadians Κοινὸν τῶν ʼΑρκάδων Koinon ton Arkadon
- 370 BC
- Common languages: Arcadian Greek
- Religion: Ancient Greek religion
- Government: Federation
- Strategos
- Legislature: Arcadian assembly
- Historical era: Classical Antiquity
  - Re-founded: 370 BC
- Currency: Drachma
Preceded by	Succeeded by
Peloponnesian League	Achaean League
- Today part of: Greece

The Arcadian League (Ancient Greek: Κοινὸν τῶν Ἀρκάδων) was a league of city-states in ancient Greece. It combined the various cities of Arcadia, in the Peloponnese, into a single state. The league was founded in 370 BC, taking advantage of the decreased power of Sparta, which had previously dominated and controlled Arcadia. Mantinea, a city that had suffered under Spartan dominance, was particularly prominent in pushing for its founding. The league was responsible for the foundation of Megalopolis.

Although initially successful in resisting Spartan influence in Arcadia, the league was soon divided in the power struggles that engulfed Greece in the 4th century BC. Thebes, which had been instrumental in the founding of the league, soon came into conflict with Mantinea. At the Battle of Mantinea (362 BC), the cities of the league fought against each other, Mantinea fighting alongside Sparta and Athens, while Tegea and others sided with Thebes.

== Arcadia and the Peloponnese before 370 ==
Beginning in the 6th century BC and continuing through the 5th and early 4th centuries, Sparta dominated the Peloponnese, and compelled its neighbors to join its Peloponnesian League and fight in its wars. This dominance naturally aroused anger amongst these neighboring states, and Sparta's allies proved themselves willing to rise up against their overlord on several occasions. In 418 BC, Mantinea joined a league of Peloponnesian democratic states that briefly pursued an anti-Spartan policy before being defeated at the Battle of Mantinea (418 BC).

After the end of the Peloponnesian War in 404 BC, Sparta, under king Agesilaus, took several opportunities over the ensuing years to discipline a number of restive allies. In 385 BC, the Spartans attacked Mantinea and forced the city to dissolve, splitting it into five separate villages, each of which was governed by a Spartan-backed oligarchy. Oligarchic governments throughout the rest of Arcadia also received Spartan support.

The Spartan military dominance that enabled this interference in Arcadian affairs was suddenly ended in 371 BC, when Epaminondas and his Boeotian army decisively defeated a Spartan army at Leuctra, killing a sizable portion of the elite Spartiate class. This development upset the balance of power in the Peloponnese and opened new possibilities for action by anti-Spartan factions.

== Formation of the league ==
The first sign of rebellious activity in Arcadia came in the spring of 370 BC, when the city of Mantinea began reassembling from the villages it had been divided into, under democratic leadership. Shortly after this, a number of Arcadian communities began to assemble into a league for mutual protection against Sparta, an effort led by Lycomedes, a Mantinean. Substantial resistance was encountered at Tegea, where an oligarchic government was in power, but Tegean democrats overthrew this government with the aid of Mantinean troops, and the formation of the league proceeded. A Spartan army under Agesilaus was sent to attempt to restore the oligarchs, but achieved nothing. After driving off the Spartans, the Arcadians began work on the new city of Megalopolis, a strongly fortified capital city positioned to serve as a bulwark against Sparta.

Although this first attempt to break up the new league had ended without success, the threat of further military intervention prompted the Arcadians to dispatch ambassadors to Athens, requesting protection. The Athenians were theoretically bound by the terms of a treaty signed in late 371 BC to protect the autonomy of all Greek states, but their desire to maintain the strength of Sparta as a check on the ambitions of the Thebans led them to refuse the Arcadians' request. Continuing to Thebes, however, the Arcadians soon obtained the assistance they sought. A massive Boeotian army, led by Epaminondas and Pelopidas, was dispatched to the Peloponnese.

Reaching Arcadia, this army was swelled to some 50,000 to 70,000 men by the arrival of Argive, Elean, and Arcadian forces. For the Spartans to challenge such a massive force in the field would have been little short of suicidal; accordingly, over the next several months, Epaminondas twice led the army south into Spartan territory, first to ravage Laconia and then to liberate Messenia. This latter action, by depriving Sparta of much of her territory and placing a new hostile state on her borders, essentially ended any serious threat to the Arcadians. As the Theban army returned north, the Arcadians were free to go on with organizing their league without fear of Spartan interference. By 369 BC, most if not all Arcadian states had joined the league.

== Government and structure ==
Cities entering the Arcadian league seem to have surrendered a large degree of their autonomy to the federal government. The league maintained a standing army, and a section of the new capital at Megalopolis was filled with federal buildings and barracks for that army. The league conducted a unified foreign policy, either led by a chief executive or executives (which is not clear) holding the title of strategos.

The league had a democratic constitution, although how widely the franchise was extended is unclear. The body of voting citizens was known as the myrioi, or "ten thousand." If this number is taken as a rough estimate of the actual size of the body, the body would have consisted only of citizens of hoplite class or higher (the upper-middle class and up). If, on the other hand, the word is interpreted in its figurative meaning of "a very large number," it is possible that the body may have been much larger, possibly including all free males. A smaller council, the Boule, was composed of an unknown number of representatives from the various cities of the federation. This council probably handled administrative matters, and, if it served a similar function to the council of the same name at Athens, may have prepared resolutions to be debated by the myrioi. Finally, 50 officials known as demiourgoi probably served as a working committee of the Boule.

The league created the Epariti, a military unit with the role to preserve the independence of the Arcadian towns and defend the common interests of the league. They were 5,000 and were paid by the state.

== History after 370 BC ==
After its establishment in 370 BC, the Arcadian League took an active role in the politics of the Peloponnese. Arcadian soldiers campaigned with a Theban army during Epaminondas's second invasion of the Peloponnese in 369 BC, and continued to campaign in 368 BC, defeating a joint Athenian and Corinthian force, then raiding successfully into Spartan territory, but in the summer of 368 BC, a Spartan force invaded Arcadia and wiped out an Arcadian force without suffering a single casualty, in what became known as the "tearless battle." Xenophon asserts that the Arcadians' allies, the Thebans and Eleans, "were almost as well pleased as the Lacedaemonians at the misfortune of the Arcadians – so vexed had they become by this time at their presumption." After this defeat, the Arcadians hurried the completion of the fortifications at Megalopolis to prevent further Spartan incursions. The league's military fortunes revived over the next few years, however, and in 365 BC the league fought and won a war against Elis.

A Theban army had invaded the Peloponnese in 366 BC, but the purpose of that expedition was to establish Achaea as a counterweight to Arcadian influence; although this effort was largely a failure, it antagonized leading Arcadians. Accordingly, in that same year, Lycomedes persuaded the myrioi to make an alliance with Athens; the Athenians, although reluctant to ally with enemies of their allies the Spartans, could not pass up such a chance to undermine Theban influence. In 364 BC, the Arcadian strategos Aeneas of Stymphalos intervened in Sicyon, expelling the tyrant of that city.

The split of the Confederacy in 363 BC was rooted in both financial and ideological disputes. The immediate trigger was a conflict over the financing of the eparitoi (a standing force). After the Confederacy’s war against Elis in 365 BC for control of Lasion, a war which saw Arcadian forces occupy Olympia, establish Pisa as a puppet state, and even conduct the Olympic Games themselves, the confederate magistrates controversially used Olympic funds to maintain the eparitoi. Mantinea objected strongly, preferring to contribute its share from its own treasury, and rejected the magistrates’ summons to appear before the assembly. When the eparitoi were sent to arrest Mantineian leaders, Mantinea refused them entry, escalating tensions further. Although the assembly later decreed that Olympic funds should no longer be used for the eparitoi, this did little to repair the rift. As poorer citizens dropped out of the eparitoi due to lack of funds, wealthier volunteers took their place, effecting what was essentially an oligarchic takeover of confederate control.

The political consequences were profound. Mantinea’s resistance, combined with a wider appeal of the oligarchic shift, led the magistrates to seek Theban intervention to prevent the confederacy from aligning with Sparta. Despite these efforts, the newly composed eparitoi did ally with Sparta, culminating in the Battle of Mantinea in 362 BC. There, Arcadian unity was visibly fractured: Mantinea, aligned with Sparta and Athens, opposed Tegea and Megalopolis, who fought alongside the Boeotians. This battle marked the definitive end of a united Arcadia.

Although it never regained the prominence it had held during the 360s BC, an Arcadian league in some form, whether a continuation or a recreation of the original league is unclear, continued to exist in the years after the Battle of Mantinea. Various references indicate that the league endured at least into the 3rd century BC. According to an obscure passage in Pausanias, the Arcadian League may have experienced a short period of revival between 250 and 245 BC, after the liberation of Megalopolis from tyranny. The date of its final disappearance is uncertain, but at the latest it had dissolved by the 230s BC, as at that point the Arcadian cities joined the Achaean League.

Modern scholarship, particularly the analysis of Thomas Heine Nielsen, nuances this narrative. As Nielsen concludes, while the Confederacy did indeed survive beyond 362 BC, it evolved into an organization increasingly centered on Mantinea, which likely never succeeded in uniting the whole of Arcadia again. Notably, Nielsen raises doubts as to whether Megalopolis ever rejoined the Confederacy. In fact, both Megalopolis and Mantinea may have each led rival confederacies after 362 BC, resulting in the curious possibility that two parallel Arcadian Confederacies existed simultaneously. Unfortunately, the available evidence is too fragmentary to reconstruct this situation in detail: “After 362 and at least until 322 there existed one or two organizations claiming to be the Arkadian Confederacy, but neither of them united the entire region”.

Further developments in the Hellenistic period also suggest that some form of the Confederacy persisted even after 323 BC. Scholar J. Roy argued that the continued use of the regional ethnic Arkas in inscriptions, particularly when used in a way that reflects constitutional matters, indicates the Confederacy’s survival until approximately 235 BC. Roy posits that this later league gradually dissolved as more Arcadian communities joined the Achaean League. W.W. Tarn similarly maintained that the Arcadian League demonstrated cohesion well into the Hellenistic period, observing that “In the Lamian War, Arcadia acts as a unit; and the League was in existence from 320/9 to 304/3, even if Cassander sometimes deprived it of a city. It must have entered Demetrios’ Panhellenic League of 303 as a unit.”
