= Moschofilero =

Variety of grape

- Grape (Vitis)
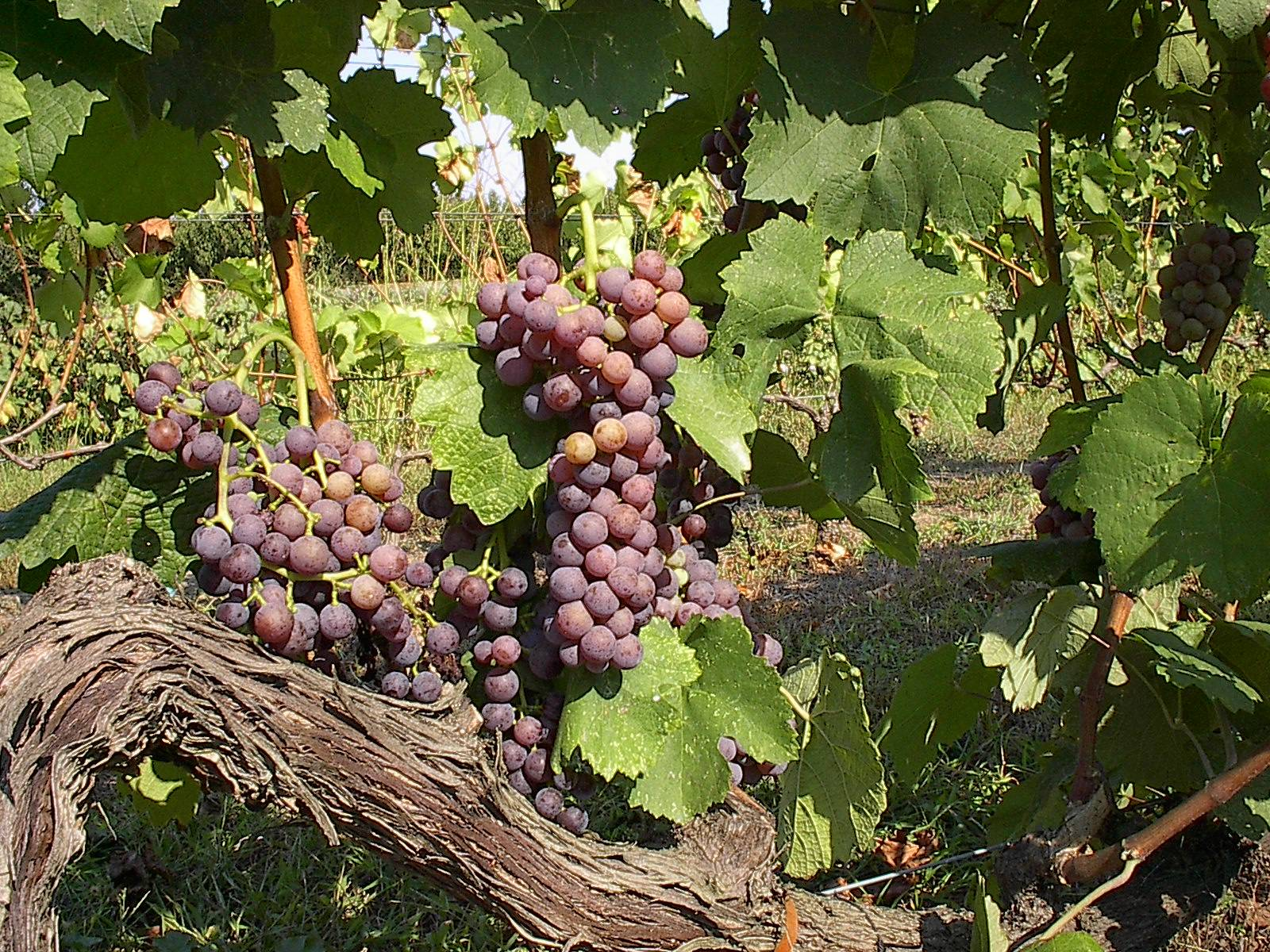
- Moschofilero grapes
- Color of berry skin: Rose
- Species: Vitis vinifera
- Also called: see list of synonyms
- Origin: Greece
- VIVC number: 8068

Moschofilero (Greek: Μοσχοφίλερο) is an aromatic white grape of Greek origins with a pink/purple skin and quite spicy flavor with good acidity. Grown throughout much of Greece and primarily in Peloponnese where it is traditionally used to make a dry and bold wine with much spice and perfume. It is characterized by a "rose garden" bouquet and is usually paired with fresh fruit or fruit-based desserts. It makes still, sparkling, and dessert wines, and can have characteristics similar to the Muscat. It ripens late and can have problems with hot weather. It is the grape required to make the "Mantineia" PDO blanc de gris wines.

Moschofilero grows in Northern California at the Abbey of New Clairvaux since 2011. The original Moschofilero cuttings were imported in 1948 by Harold Olmo, grape breeder at the University of California, Davis, where they were stored until the abbey of New Clairvaux took interest in the early 2000s.

== Synonyms ==
Moschofilero is also known under the synonyms Fileri Tripoleos, Filleri Tripoleos, Moschophilero, Moscophilero, Mosxofilero, Phileri Tripoleos. The Filéri family of cultivars also includes the white and black Filéri varietals.
