= Nicodorus of Mantineia =

5th-century BC Greek statesman and lawgiver

Nicodorus (Ancient Greek: Νικόδωρος, fl. 425 BC) was an ancient Greek statesman of Mantineia. He was a notable lawgiver in his hometown and praised for his work by the controversial sophist Diagoras of Melos. Diagoras, who was later condemned as an atheist by the Athenians, reportedly assisted Nicodorus in his legislation. Both men wrote a constitution for Mantineia which was described by Aristotle and Polybius as a rare example of democratic moderation and equilibrium. When the Spartan conqueror Cleomenes III restored the ancient laws of the Mantineians in 226 BC, this probably referred to the constitution of Nicodorus.
