= Vin gris =

Type of wine

Vin gris (French: [vɛ̃ gʁi]), also called grey wine, is a variant of rosé wine made from red grapes, in particular Pinot noir and Pinot gris. Pinot noir is a black grape, but can also be used to make rosé or white wine. When the grapes are brought to the winery and crushed, the juice is run off and removed from contact with the skin, leaving the color and flavor compounds from the skin behind. The juice is then typically fermented in stainless steel tanks before being bottled shortly after, without any aging in oak barrels.

Producing a small volume of vin gris (or rosé) can also be used as a technique to improve Pinot noir. Removing some clear juice increases the concentration of colors and flavor compounds from the skins in the remaining juice intended for making red wine; the resulting rosé is known as a saignée (bled).

== Grape varieties ==
Another grape used to produce vin gris is Gamay, particularly in Lorraine, where the Côtes de Toul zone produces a light vin gris. The vinification is the same as with Pinot noir (short contact of the white juice with the red skins during the pressing), but the fruity flavor of Gamay greatly changes the taste of the wine.

Champagne is often made using this process, when it is known as blanc de noirs.

The Moschofilero, an indigenous grape of Arcadia, Greece, is a grape with pink-to-purple skin and white flesh, and makes blanc de gris wines of the Mantineia appellation of origin.

== See also ==
- Wine color
