= Epariti =

Epariti (Ancient Greek: ἐπάριτοι), was an elite military unit of the Arcadian League. The name was of Arcadian origin and meant "selected", "picked". Diodorus Siculus called them ἐπίλεκτοι ("selected", "picked", "elite"). Hesychius of Alexandria called them ἐπαρόητοι. Stephanus of Byzantium called them ἐπαρῖται but is a misquotation and also misunderstood them as an Arcadian tribe from the town Eparis (Ἔπαρις).

This unit was formed after the defeat of the Spartans at the Battle of Leuctra and its role was to preserve the independence of the Arcadian towns and defend the common interests of the League. They were 5,000 and were paid by the state. Xenophon wrote in detail about this unit.
