= Lycomedes of Mantinea =

4th-century BC Greek Mantinean politician

Lycomedes (died 366 BC), known through Xenophon, was a Mantinean politician, who led the effort to found the Arcadian League in 371 and 370 BC, and was the dominant political figure of that league until his death in 366 BC; John Fine has described him as the most effective leader of the league. Xenophon records that he won the support of the Arcadians by reminding them that they were the only autochthonous people of the Peloponnese, and by praising their bravery and strength. Throughout his career, he supported policies intended to free Arcadia from dependence on outside forces.

In 366 BC, Lycomedes persuaded the Arcadians to seek an alliance with Athens, attempting to balance the strength of Thebes. Lycomedes was sent to Athens to negotiate this alliance; during his return, his ship landed at a spot where a number of Arcadian exiles were living. Lycomedes was then killed by these exiles.
