= Nestani =

Nestani Νεστάνη
- Community
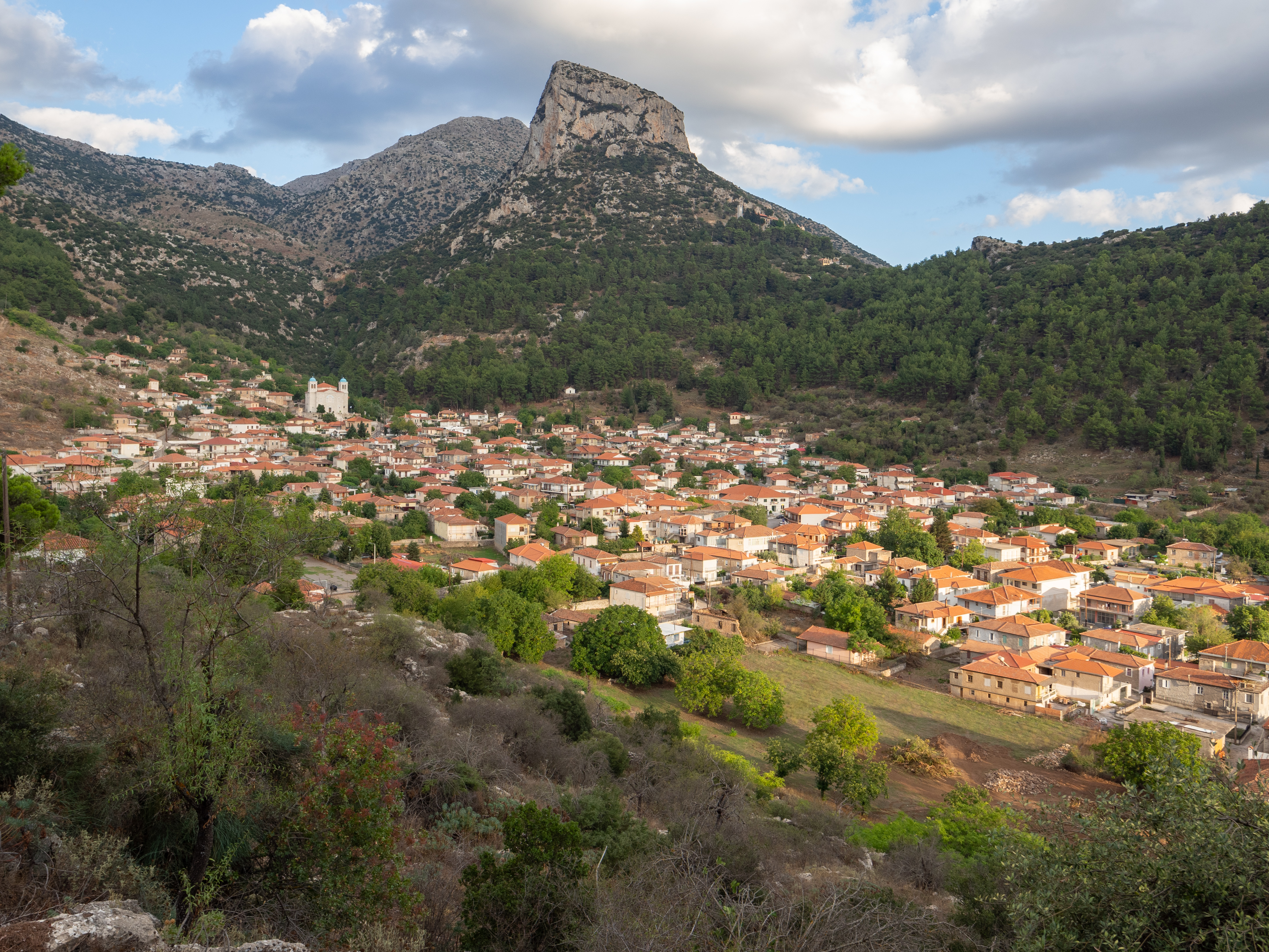

- Location within Greece
- Coordinates: 37°37′N 22°28′E
- Country: Greece
- Administrative region: Peloponnese
- Regional unit: Arcadia
- Municipality: Tripoli
- Municipal unit: Mantineia

Population (2021)
  - Community: 580
- Time zone: UTC+2 (EET)
  - Summer (DST): UTC+3 (EEST)
- Postal code: 220 05
- Area code: 2710

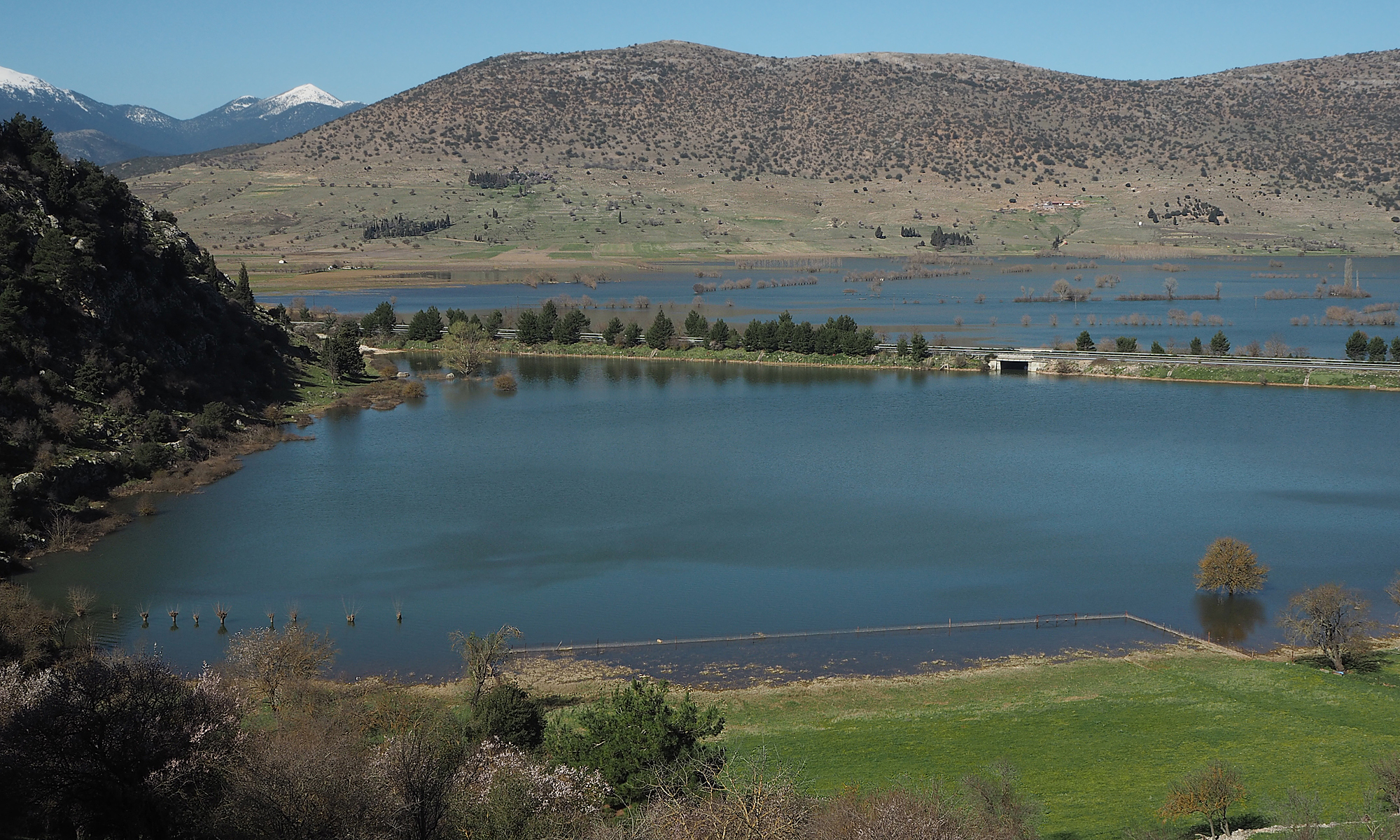
Temporary lake in karst basin Argon Pedion

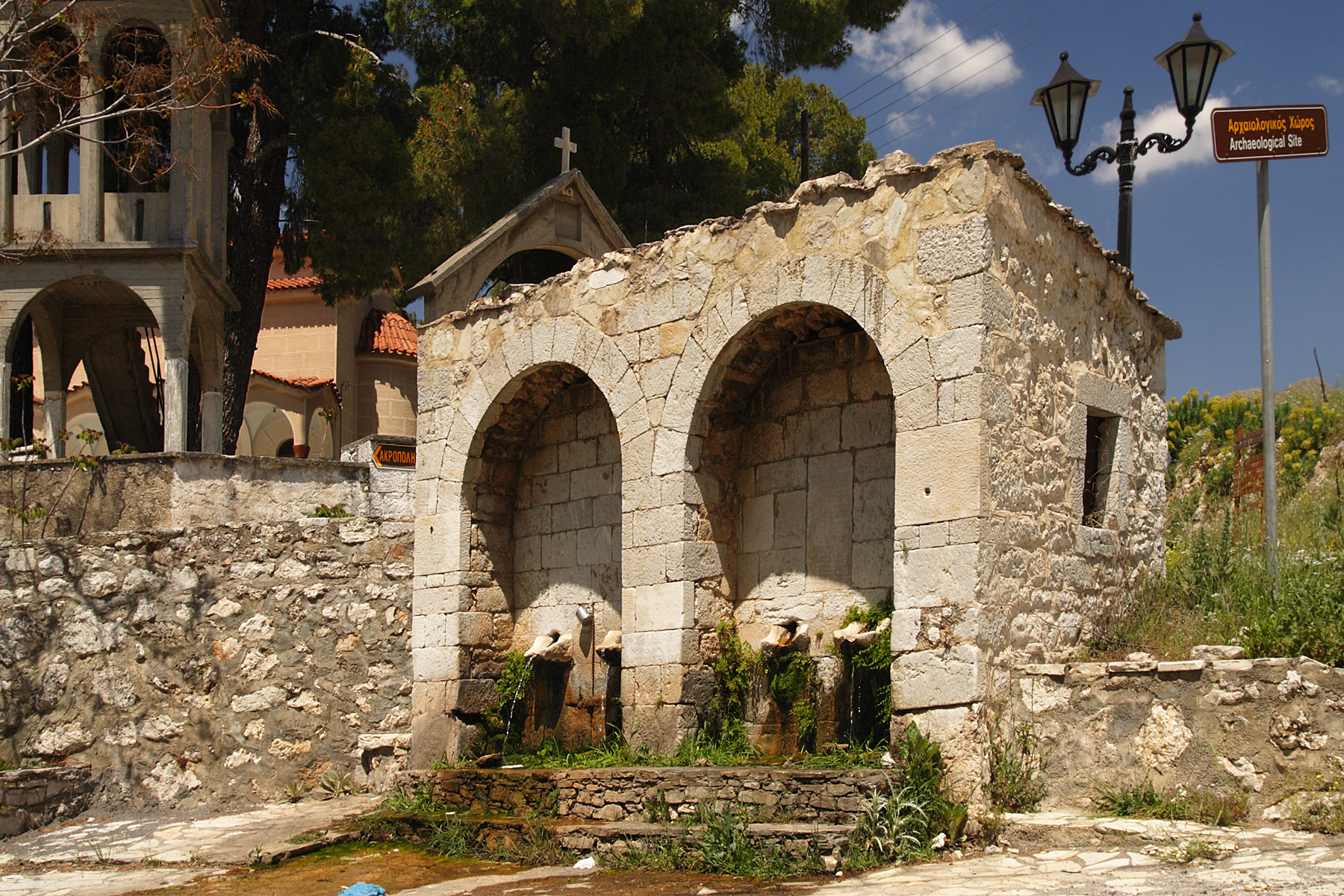
Remnant of a fountain of "Philip II of Macedon” (φιλίππεοις Κρήνη)

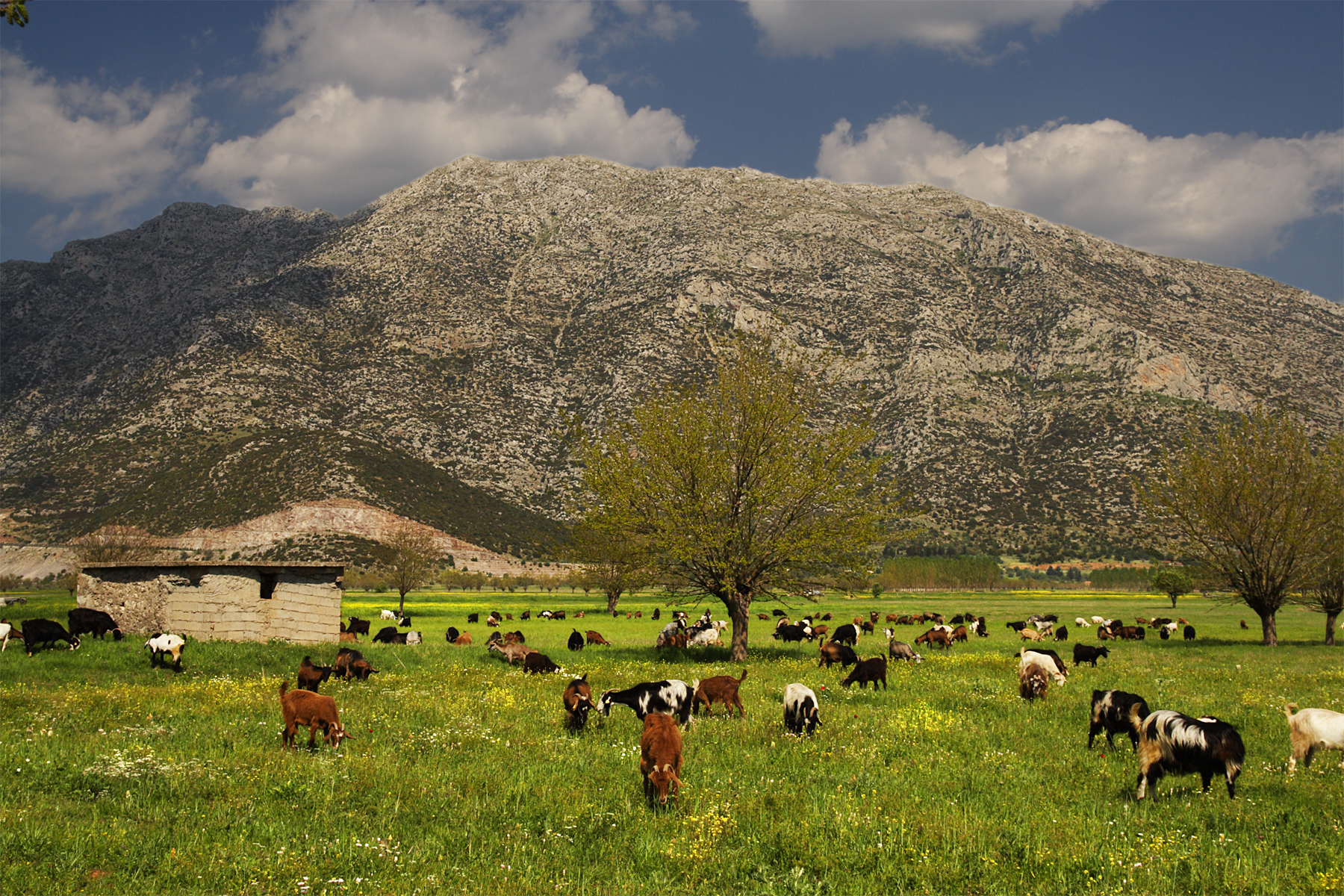
Argon Pedion in springtime

Nestani (Greek: Νεστάνη, before 1927: Τσιπιανά Tsipiana) is a village and a community in the municipal unit Mantineia, Arcadia, Greece.

== Geography ==
It is situated at the foot of the mountain Artemisio, at about 700 m elevation. It was the seat of the former municipality Mantineia. The community Nestani also contains the village of Milea. Nestani is 11 km east of Kapsas, 13 km southwest of Lyrkeia (Argolis) and 14 km northeast of Tripoli. The Moreas Motorway (Corinth–Tripoli-Kalamata/Sparta) passes west of the village.

The monastery of Panagia Gorgoepikοos is situated on a hill immediately southeast of the village. The Holy Mother of God is venerated there, with a celebration on 15 August. The present building dates from 1740. It is now a nunnery.

=== Environment ===
In many Greek villages styled fountains are dedicated, vivid symbols of rural identification and tradition. The spring water fountain (φιλίππεοις Κρήνη) is a well kept, rebuilt remnant of the fountain King Philip II of Macedon (382-336 BC) built, when he camped next to the ancient town of Nestane.

However, the plain Argon Pedion below the village with its peculiar properties, will be of relevance for the villages existence and further development for the years to come.

== History ==
Nestani was named after the ancient settlement Nestane, that was situated at the same place. Ancient Nestane was a village in the territory of the town Mantineia. The ruined acropolis of Nestani and the remnant of Philipps fountain can still be found in the village.

The village of Tsipiana, which grew near the ancient ruins of Nestane, was renamed Nestani in 1927.

=== Historical Legends ===
According to locals in Nestani, at one point in history a large boulder began to roll down the hill southeast of the village. This boulder was going to roll over several children, when the Theotokos, (Mary, mother of Jesus), appeared and miraculously stopped the boulder. She stopped it by stretching out her hand, and it's said the handprint is still there today.

=== Current day ===
In Arcadia agriculture, raising and herding livestock, some trading are the dominant occupations. The same is true for most residents of the village. But securing livelihood in accordance with what is locally facilitated is on the decline, as migration, particularly significant since 1945 and mainly to the Americas, promises a better life. This is one reason, why the population of Nestani is diminishing. Urbanization is another, more recent phenomenon, since better roads, improved mobility and job opportunities in Arcadias capital Tripoli and in the environment are better. The village has an annual festival on 15 August to celebrate the Virgin Mary during which many visitors from abroad attend.

== Historical population ==
Year	Population
1981	1,131
1991	881
2001	778
2011	669
2021	580

== See also ==
- List of settlements in Arcadia
