= Argon Pedion =

Geological feature in Greece

Coordinates: 37°37′52″N 22°27′04″E

Argon Pedion (Greek: Ἀργὸν Πεδίον, lit. 'untilled plain') is the geological name of a "closed karst basin" in the Arcadian highlands in the Peloponnese peninsula of southern Greece. The first known appearance of this name was in a publication by the ancient geographer Pausanias (110–180 AD). He called it an untilled plain because the grassland and acres may be flooded beyond the time when annual vegetation starts. When the winter rains were very heavy, floods could even turn the plain into a temporary lake. Intensive karst formation (drainage in underground waterways of limestone layers) prevents the formation of a permanent lake. In rare cases, even today, modern technologies can not prevent flooding.

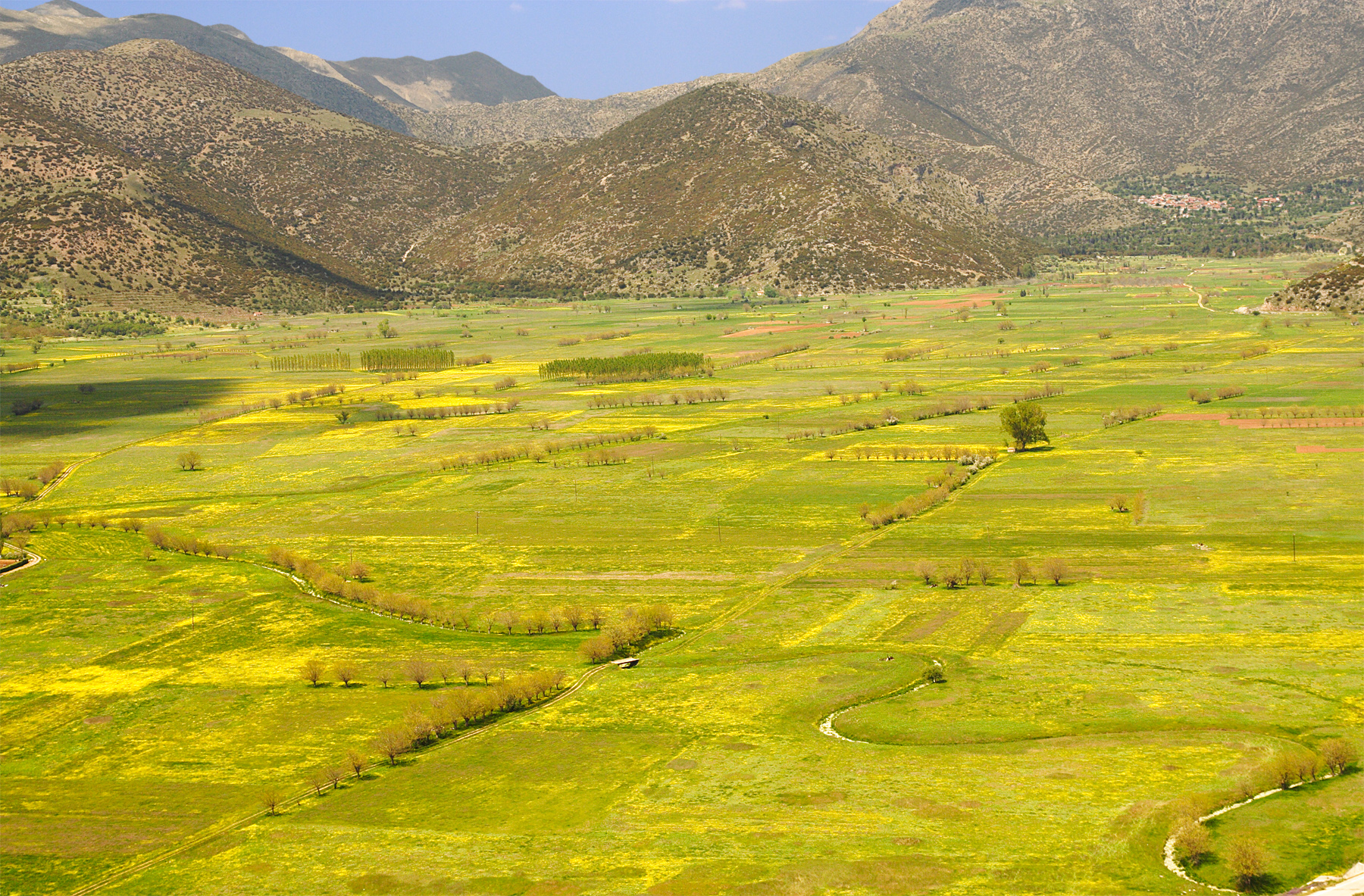
The Polje Argon Pedion. Drainage only by ponor(s)

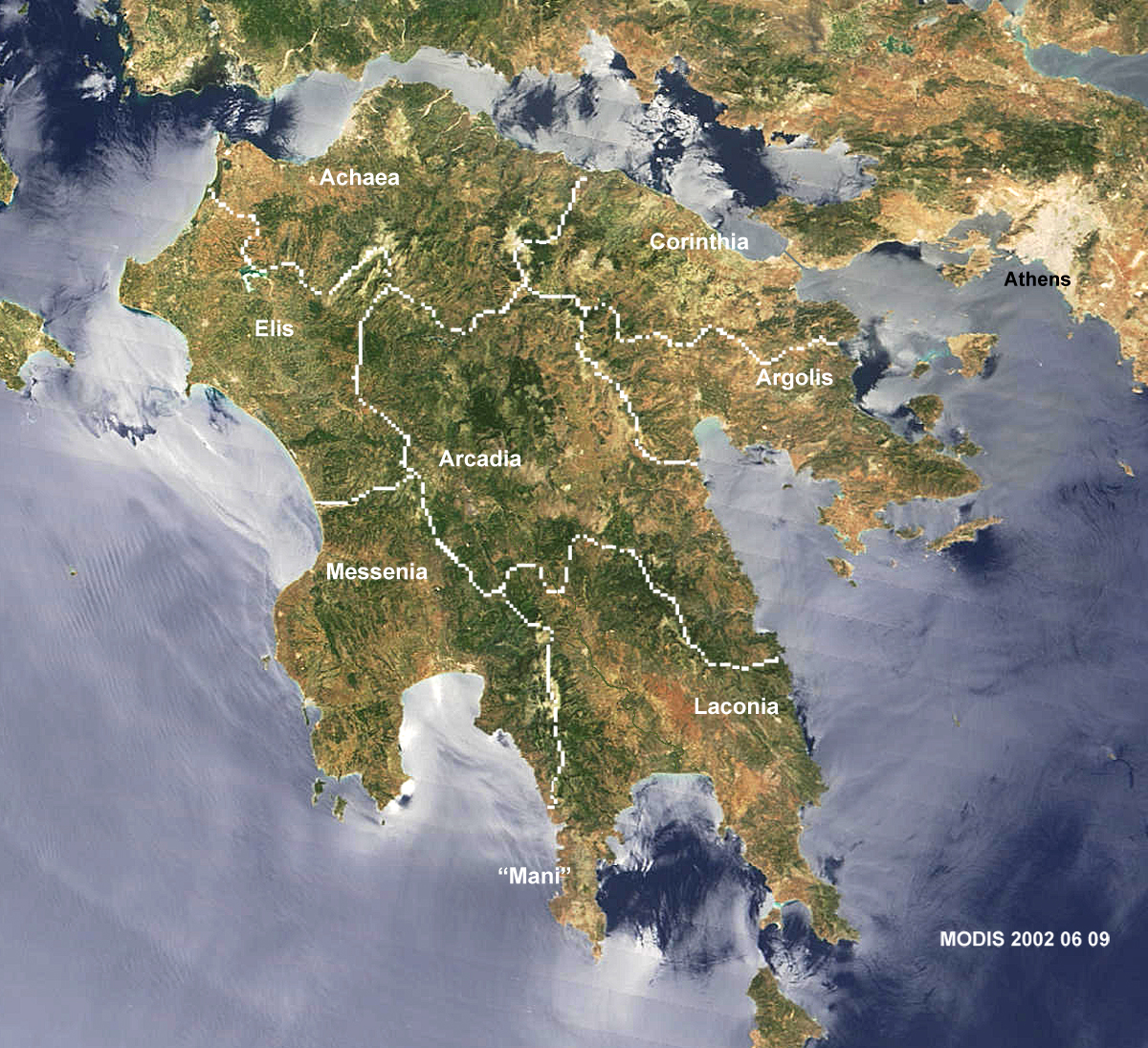
Peloponnese

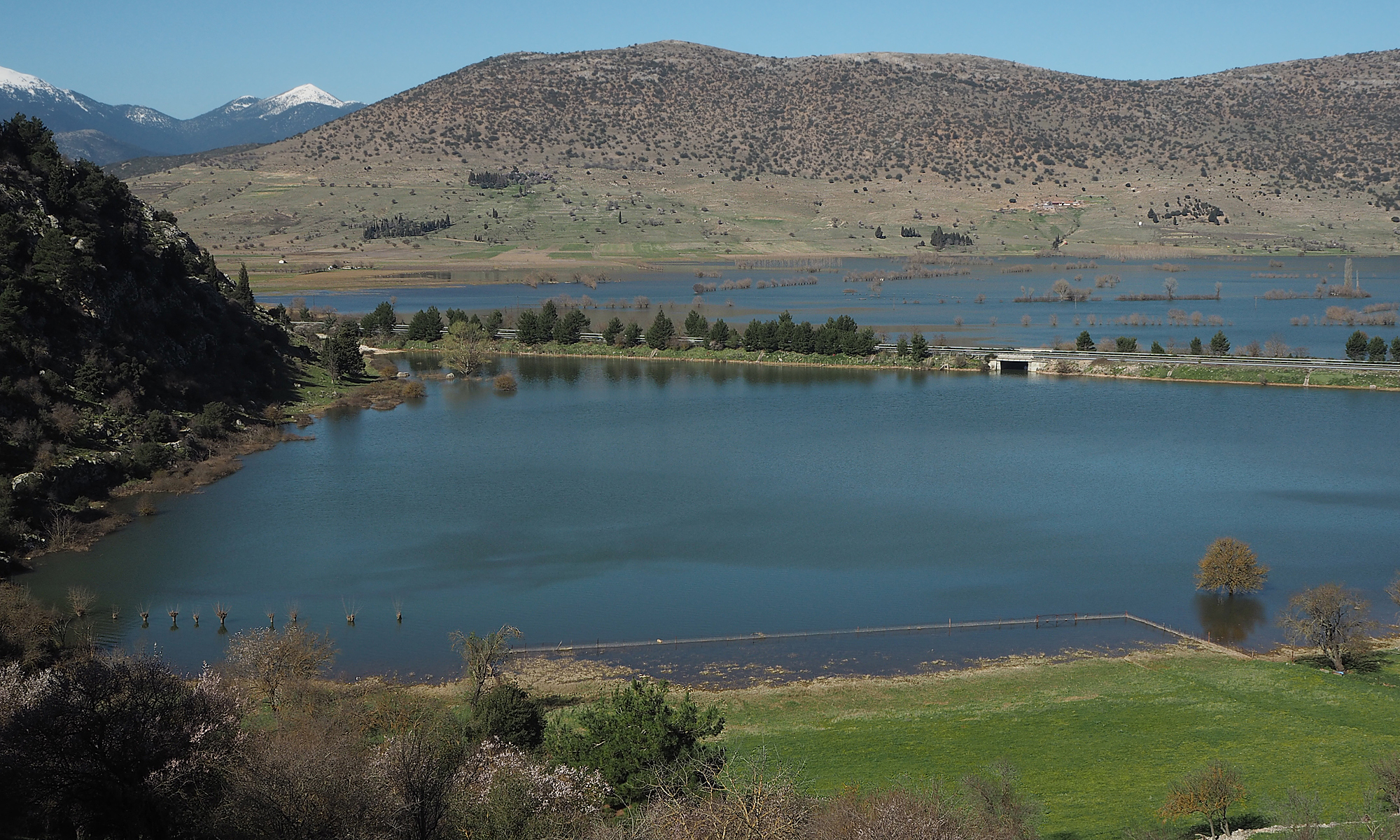
Temporary lake in Argon Pedion, A7 motorway. Ditch to ponor (10 tree tops in water, front left)

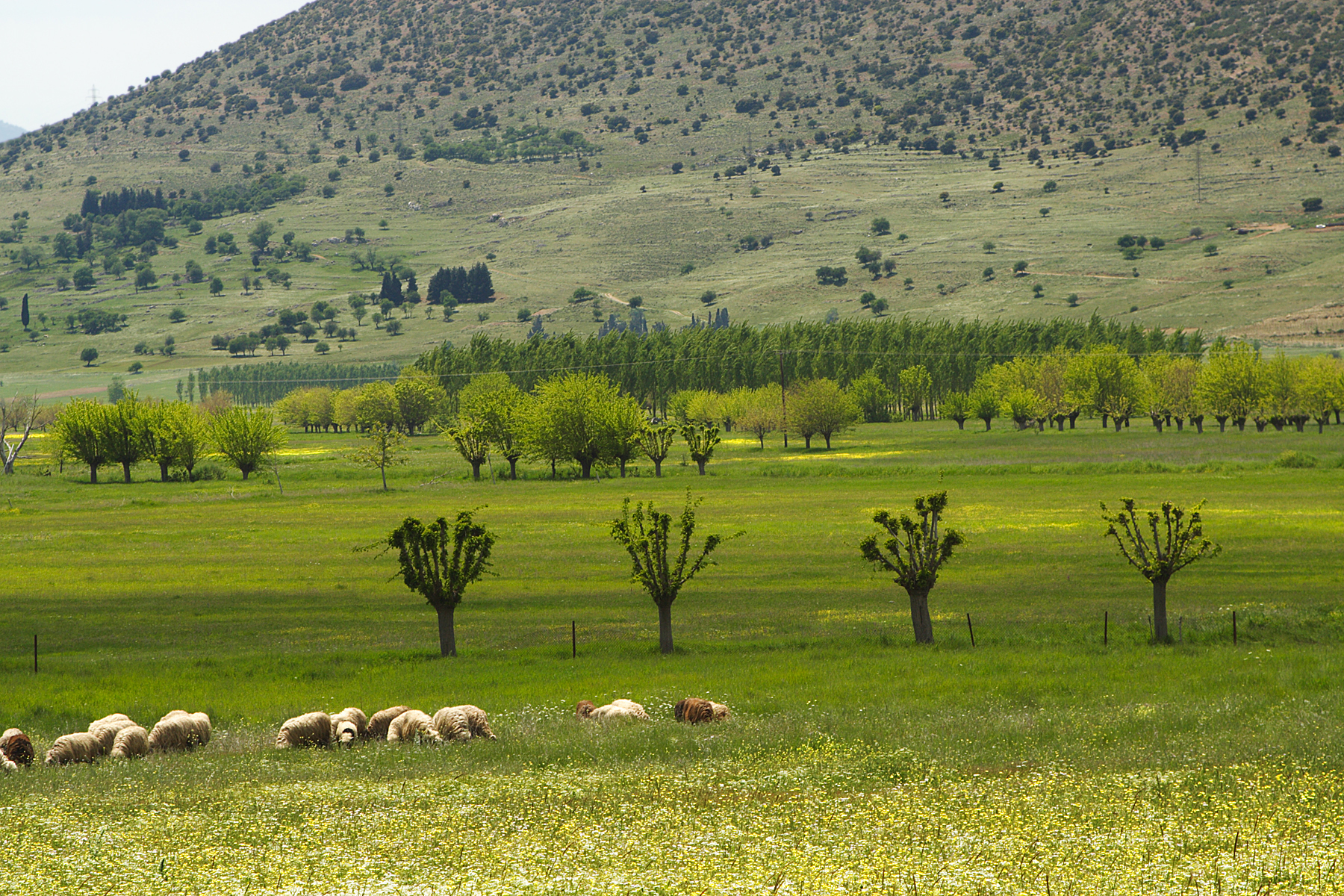
Totally green in springtime

== Geography ==
=== Environment ===
The prefecture Arcadia (Νομός Αρκαδίας) is almost entirely rural and mountainous (Arcadian Plateau). The villages are scattered all over the land; there are only very few cities, and even the largest city Tripoli, Greece, with ca. 30000 inhabitants (without district and hinterland), is relatively small. Steep mountains and forests are scarcely populated. Extensive forests dominate the central north (Mainalo) and the central-south, following the prefecture's southern border, which marks the mountain chain of the Parnon, way down to the coast of the Argolic Gulf. Valleys divide the mountain chains, but they are important draining paths only from November to April, while many brooks even dry up totally. The size of the valleys indicates there were larger water quantities in earlier time periods.

On steeply inclined slopes, the topsoil is often drastically eroded; only degenerated shrubland prevails. Alluvial sediment deposits are scarce. Accumulated soil structures are found only in plains, basins, or flat coastal sections. The climate of the Peloponnese is similar in all parts; the temperature varies only in relation to the height. The influence of the Mediterranean Sea is omnipresent, as no point of the land is at a distance greater than 50 miles. The climate is best classified as mediterranean with dry hot summers and mild wet winters. As the dry season may last for months, the thin layers of soil on mountain slopes are merely covered by Maquis shrubland, often of a degraded character. Even then, forests, when healthy and dense, are only mildly more humid and cooler. Very dominant is the intensive karstification, which is present throughout. This dries out the humidity of the soil; the often closed character of karst depressions may cause floods, as subterranean drainage can be too slow. But during the relatively short springtime, the rain of the last winter and mild temperatures may result in a very beautiful, blossoming season, where biodiversity of Arcadian landscapes will show (April, May).

As intensive dry summer periods may cause a severe lack of freshwater, retaining it in reservoirs would be an important contribution to public health by supplying sufficient water at all times. At the same time, publicly supplied water for irrigation and, eventually, for electricity from power stations, could help to develop the country. The land, which is suitable for herding or agriculture, is locally cultivated in traditional forms only. There is no industrial production in Arcadia. There was migration in all of Greece, in the Peloponnese and also in Arcadia's Argon Pedion, mainly after 1945 to North America and Australia. The infrastructure of transportation is miserable. While one heavily frequented highway connects Athens with Patras along the Corinthian Gulf, there is only one other modern highway (motorway), connecting Corinth with Tripoli and the south (at Megalopoli with two divisions, towards Messenia and Laconia). The partly tolled motorways are the only constructions where the very mountainous, difficult topography of the Peloponnese does not dictate the route. The only railway line serving Arcadia and the south (Corinthia-Tripoli-Kalamata), a narrow-gauge railway, was partly refitted and then – before the new operation – liquidated, including goods traffic in 2011.

=== The polje Argon Pedion ===
The closed basin Argon Pedion (4 x 2 km, a polje similar to poljes in the karstic Dinaric Alps) is a stand-alone part of the Tripoli Basin (30 x 6 km) in the northeast. In a publication, the Greek geologist I. Mariolakos describes the Tripoli Basin, the basin of Argon Pedion, and other similar neighboring basins of Arcadia and compares them with the classical myths, which are broadly present among Greeks. Two mountains, opposite to each other, form a 250 m wide flat bottom at the south end of Argon Pedion. But as this bottom gap between the mountains is higher than the basin's bottom, it functions like a dam. Consequently, only floods with a water level of more than 5 m can be drained aboveground. This turns the plain into a closed basin. The rain down the mountains fills the draining ditches, then floods the untilled plain (grassland), making the soil soaked with water. Exceptionally large rainwaters may swell up to a temporary lake, whose upper border may not reach, or may reach, the acres in the slightly higher upper basin section that is cultivated by the village Saga. The subsurface drainage through the katavothra may be so slow that it will extend into the vegetation time (April).

The grassland is ideal for herding sheep and goats, as ground soaked with water makes abundant grass vegetation that dries up later in the dry period. With "cows of the poor," many people in the two villages at the borders of the basin make their living. When the grassland is dried up, the goats, which are well known for their abilities to undemanding feed and easy digestion, weatherproof in hot and cold and climbing well even on bare rock may move to the mountain slopes around, where they can feed on sparse vegetation of shrubs. Yet this bears the danger of overgrazing, as plants are kept down by these animals' preferred feeding of all kinds of buds.

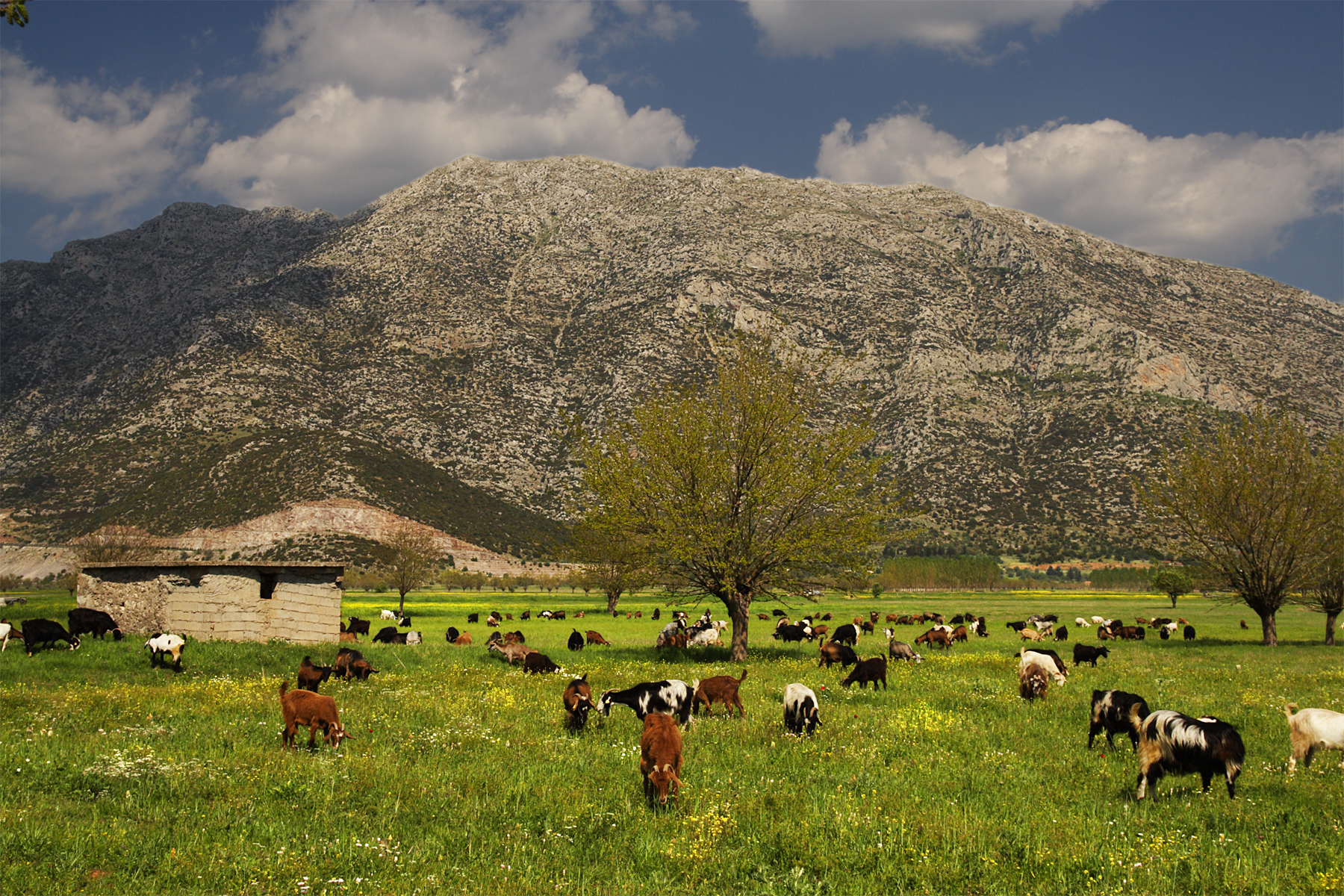
Idyllic Arcadia?

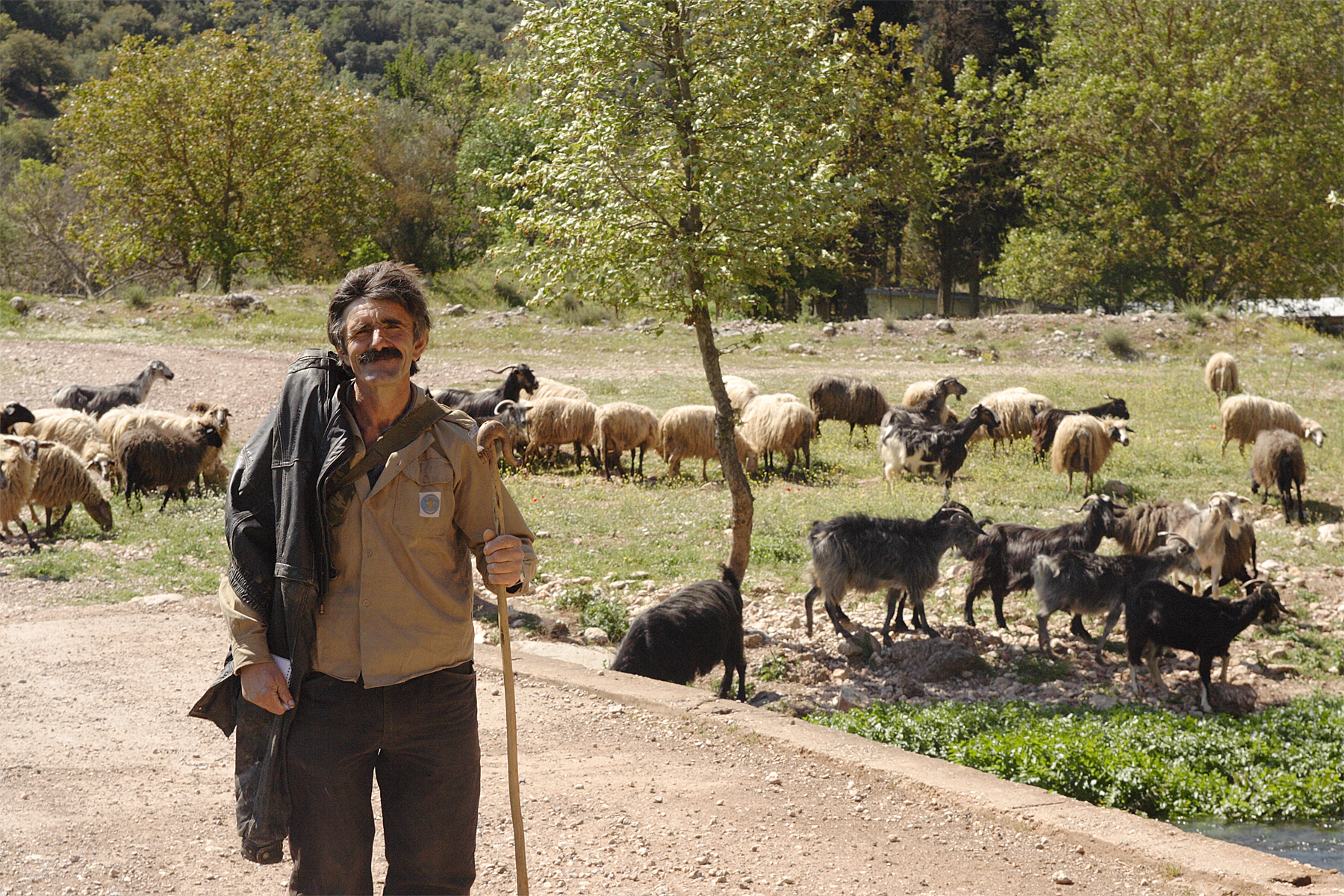
Shepherd from Likouria, Achaia

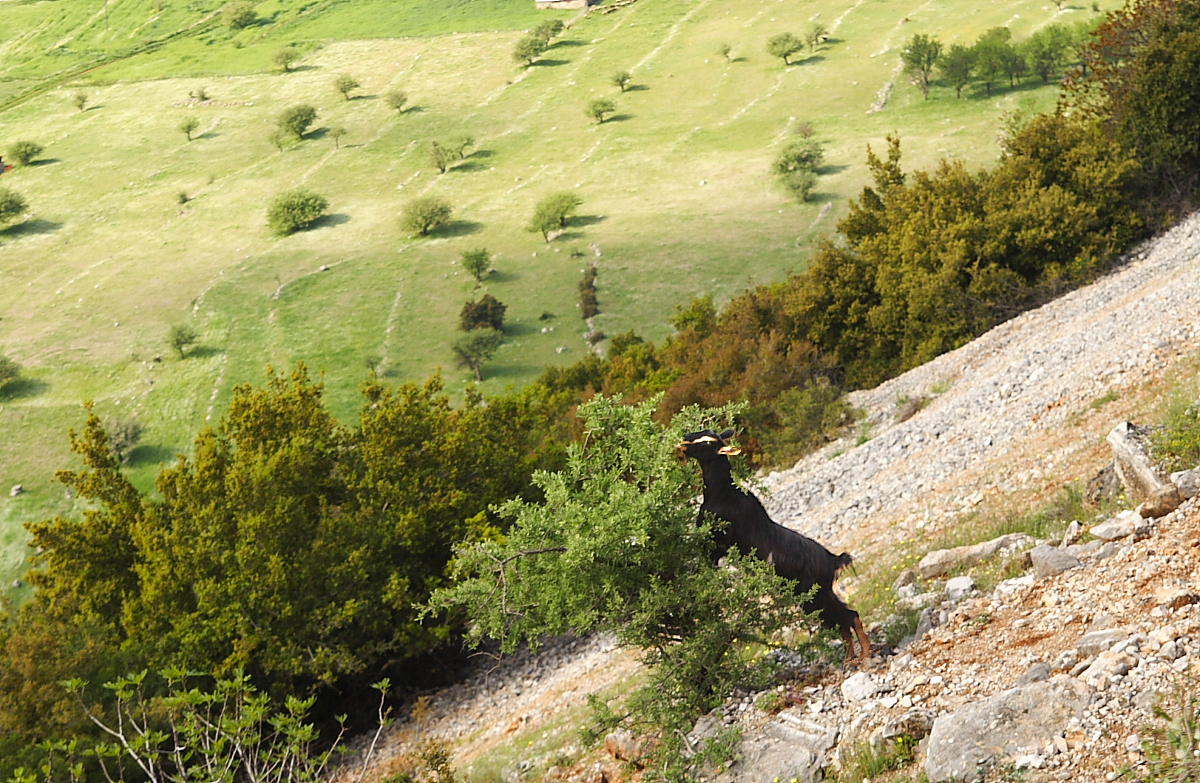
Overgrazing by goat herding

The village Saga at the upper end of the basin remains focused on cultivating the fertile soils of the upper basin; even so, the low level of mechanization and the declining importance of traditional land cultivation is imminent. However, around the village, on alluvial grounds and on slope terraces, where the soil is as rich as in the plain, the villagers successfully established gardens and niche-plantations.

== Geology, Hydrogeology ==
=== Geology of Greece ===
The peninsula Peloponnese is dominated by carbonate rock, "Tripoliza" (limestone- and similar carbonate formations). These rock formations were subject of intense tectonics that shattered the carbonate formations over time. Water, which runs through the tectonically induced fractures, chemically dissolved the rock (karstifikation) and thus widened the fractures over time (dissolution) to the size of subterranean waterways, even caves.

Physical and chemical weathering and all kinds of water erosion washed the surfaces off the mountains, over time, accumulating layers of loose sediment on the rocky floors of the basins. This is so in most parts of the Peninsula.

=== Geology and Hydrology of Argon Pedion ===
In vast parts of the Arcadian Highland, such geological and hydrogeological conditions prevail. Important tectonic fractures formed between the Arcadian Highland and the Argolic Gulf. As upper karstic forms developed the fractured structure, these became the most important hydro tectonic units. The existence of such structures has been backed up by a large geological study, which had the Arcadian basins as subject. The distribution of the subsurface karst waters and the retention time in the karstic underground, until the water emerged again in large springs at the Argolic Gulf, was quantified and verified by a lot of experimental dye tracings in 1983 and again in 1984. These experiments evaluated many subterranean waterways between several katavothres and springs at the Argolic Gulf. The drainage between Argon Pedion and the spring Kiveri (Argolic Gulf) was confirmed as one of the large underground discharges.

Although the karst water of spring Kiveri emerges in the seawater of the continental shelf, it is sweet water of surprisingly good quality: The Chlorides have an extraordinarily low value, and thus the water is suitable for irrigation. Since the emerged water quantity is large, A 5-meter-wide concrete canal was built to transport the irrigation water over 15 km to the extensive fertile low plain of Argos, where thousands of farmers cultivate the plain. Interestingly, the reemergence of the karst water of Argon Pedion in the large submarine spring Kiveri was already known by the ancient author Pausanias.

In rainy winters there may be more water than the only one katavothra, which opens in the limestone rock wall below the village Nestani, can drain rapidly enough. A temporary lake will be created. It happens that the mass of water will not all be drained by the beginning of springtime. This phenomenon of a temporary lake in Argon Pedion is documented for the years 2003, 2014, and again in March 2019. The not obstructed subterranean water transport from the katavothra to the springs at the Argolic Gulf takes ca. 190 hours.

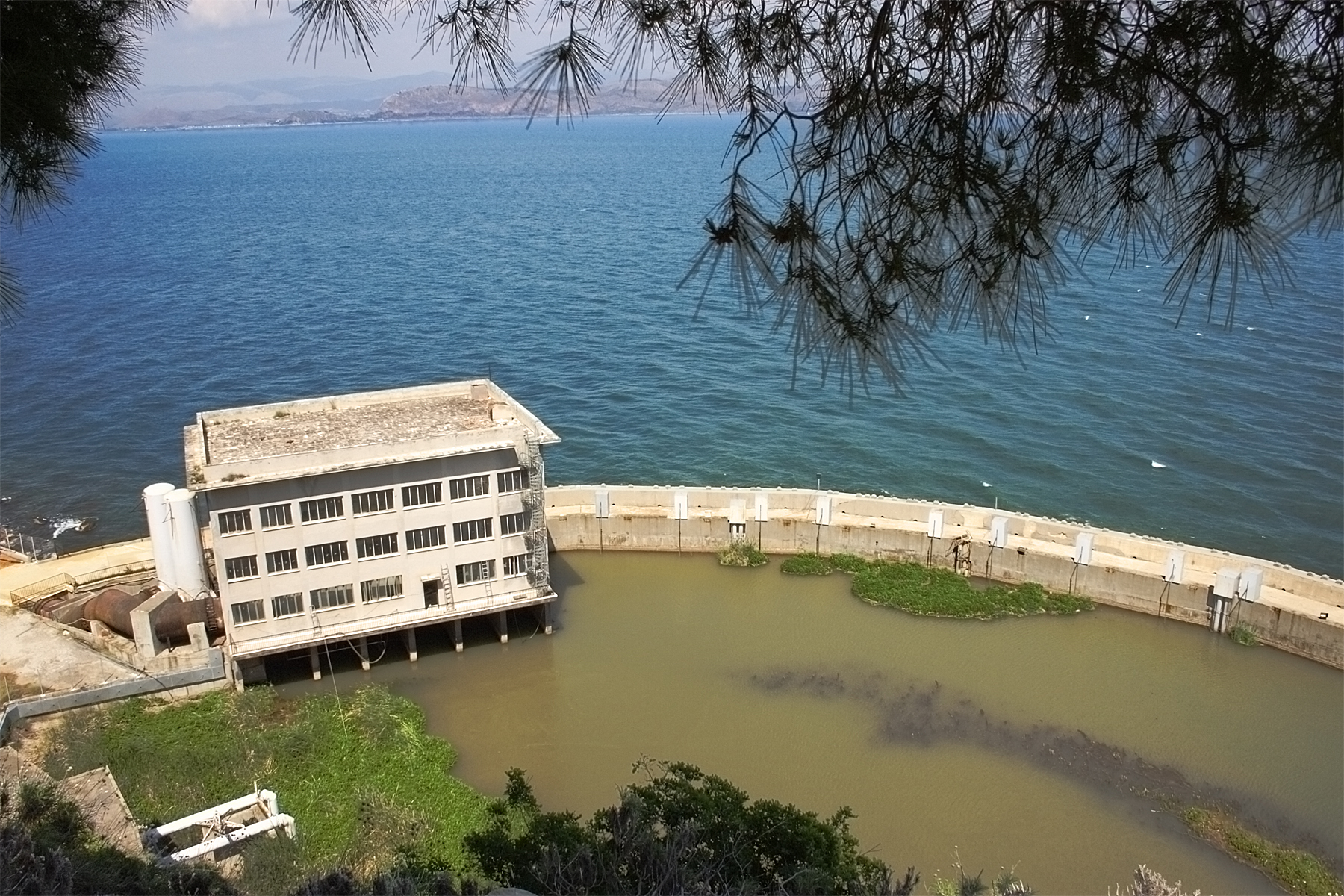
Submarine Karst spring Kiveri, Argolic Gulf. Large pumped water pipe for irrigation

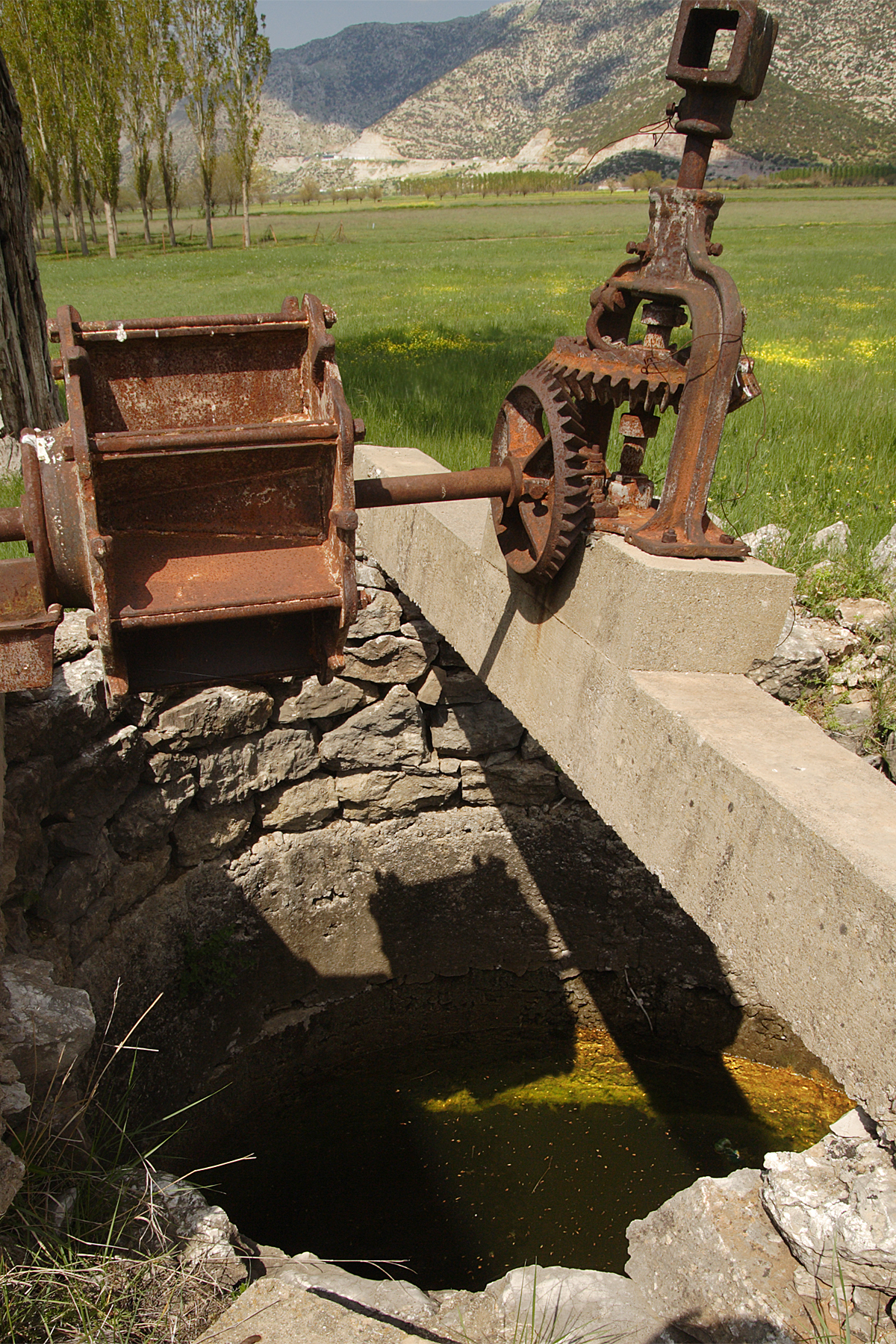
obsolete irrigation well, visible ground water level

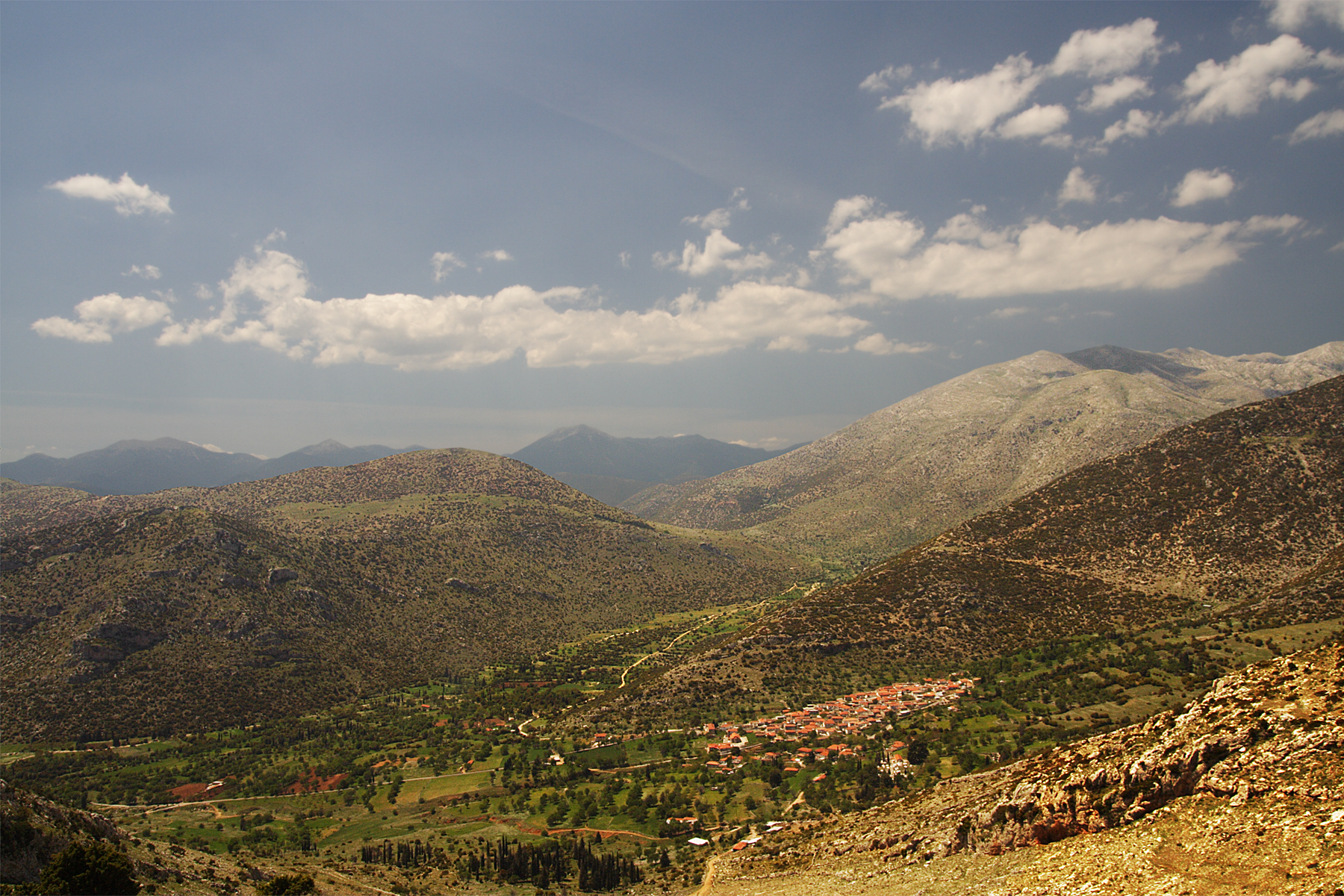
Fertile upper Argon Pedion

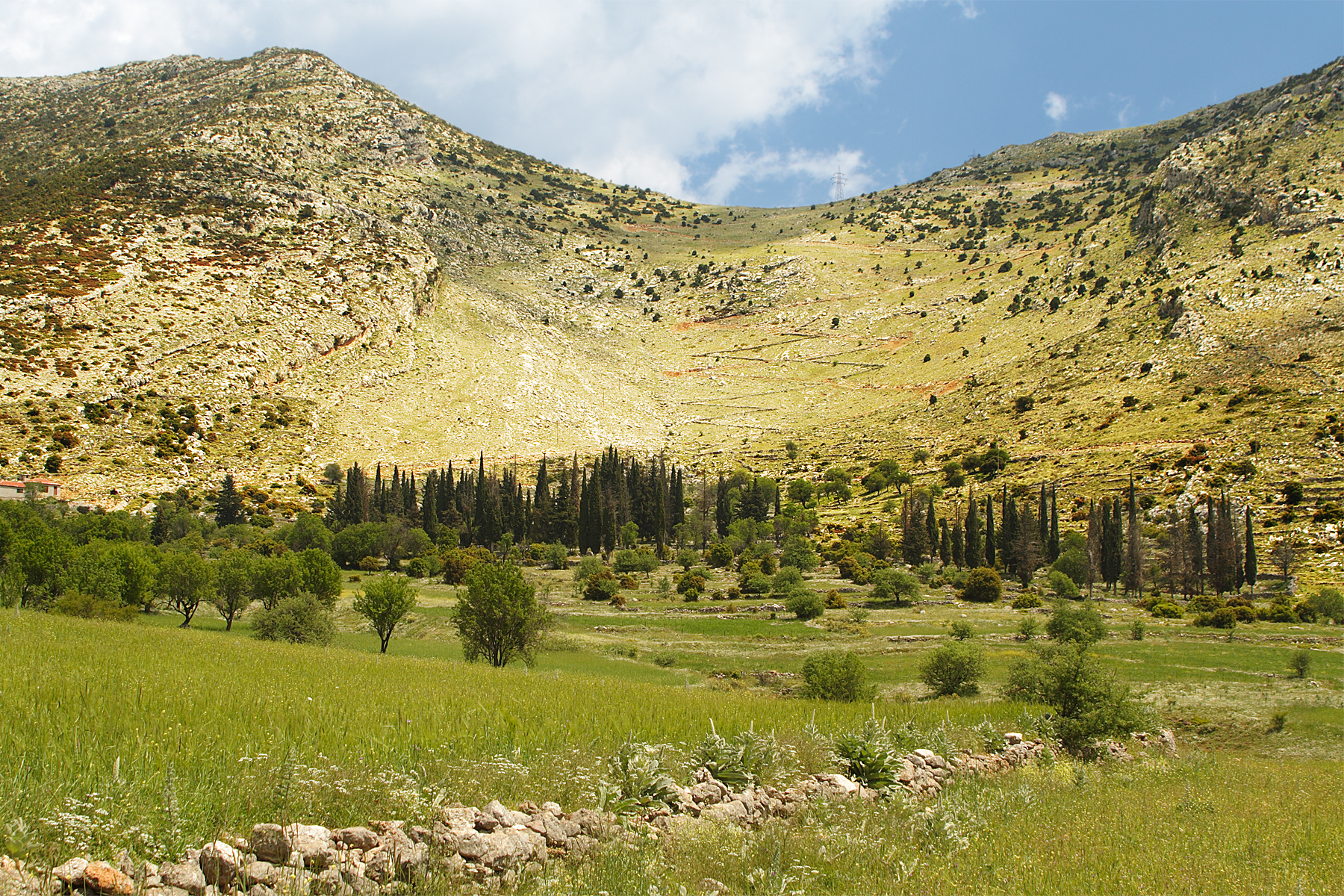
Pausanias' "Ladder" after the "Portitsa-Pass"

== Anthropogenic developments ==
The people of the villages Nestani and Saga secured their livelihood in accordance with what the plain and its environment facilitated. Cultivating the ground and properly treating the available water resources reflected the local opportunities. On alluvial soils of slopes around the villages, which have favorable grounds as in the plain, the people cultivated gardens and terraces. The care necessary for cultivating and watering the plain in the dry summer period was achieved by walled irrigation wells with chunky shovels. There were wells distributed across the whole plain. The metal is now rusty; the wells are rugged constructions, but no longer in use. Where necessary and affordable, these tools are replaced by motorized pumps. Apart from single initiatives, the mechanization of agriculture, measured by the international industry standard, is still rather modest.

Drainage ditches are everywhere in the plain and obviously important to prevent it from becoming swampy, but taking care of holding the water table and the proper humidity for grassland and acres as long as possible is another thing. All drainage is towards the one single kathavotha. That is why excessive precipitation in case of intensive winter rainfall, often exceeded the capacity of ditches to swiftly transport the water and the Katavothra to swallow it. Advanced knowledge, machinery, and methods beyond smallholding agriculture were implemented: New ditches were dredged, all ditches were well cleaned, and a row of trees was planted to strengthen the ground. The 5-meter opening of the katavothra in the massive limestone rock was sheathed by a strong metal lattice.

== History of Argon Pedion and Arcadia ==
=== The ancient geographer ===
The publication of Pausanias (120–180 AD), handed down in Hellenistic Greek (Ελλάδος περιήγησις), also available in German (Beschreibung Griechenlands) and English translation (Description of Greece), describes in Book 8, Arcadia, and explicitly also Argon Pedion. Actually, the name "Argon Pedion", the modern Greek term for "untilled plain", is the term Pausanias introduced in his publication. Pausanias describes the ancient road, which starts at the ancient city of Argos, ascending the mountain chain Artemisio to the "Portitsa-Pass" and then, abruptly downhill, the zigzag descent into the basin of Argon Pedion. The zigzag path is still there and visible (see the photo "Ladder"). Pausanias describes the "Ladder" (Κλιμαξ Παυσανία) in detail, including its steps:

[4] There is a pass into Arcadia […]. There are two others on the side of Mantineia: one through what is called Primus and one through the Ladder. The latter is the broader, and its descent had steps that were once cut into it.[…].

Pausanias, Book 8, Arcadia, 8.6.4, English by W.H.S. Jones/H.A. Ormerod, London 1918

After crossing into Mantinean country over Mount Artemisius you will come to a plain called the Untilled Plain, whose name well describes it, for the rain-water coming down into it from the mountains prevents the plain from being tilled; nothing indeed could prevent it from being a lake, were it not that the water disappears into a chasm in the earth. [2] After disappearing here it rises again at Dine (Whirlpool). Dine is a stream of fresh-water rising out of the sea by what is called Genethlium in Argolis.

Pausanias, Book 8, Arcadia, 8.7.1f, English by W.H.S. Jones/H.A. Ormerod, London 1918

Dine is referring to the Kiveri Spring.

Pausanias' time had a basic knowledge of the hydrology of the untilled plain and the re-emergence of the water in the submarine spring Kiveri in the continental shelf of the Argolic Gulf.

The ancient Portitsa-Pass is a human-made monument, that is 6 meters deep into an incision in the rock at the mountain crest and 3 meters wide, remnants of tracks of passing wagons were discovered in the passthrough. The descent on Pausanias' Ladder in ancient times was a zigzag wagon driveway, of which the historical upper section still exists. The descent is the old driveway across the basin Argon Pedion.

=== The Renaissance of Arcadian idyll ===
A notable interpretation of Theocritus "idyll" was given by the Roman epic poet Virgil. He took the idealized Sicilian rustics and set them in Arcadia. For him, Arcadia was the homeland, where idyll had its origin. The idea was reborn in the Italian Renaissance, supported by the patron Lorenzo de' Medici. Arcadia, the "Country of the Shepherds", inspired Italian poetry (Poesia bucolica) and became an important literary genre. The painter Nicolas Poussin had a lasting impression on the Baroque epoch of art. His two versions of the painting "Et in Arcadia ego" (e.g., "Even in Arcadia, there am I") symbolize pure, rural idyllic life and peace and death. Ever since, this idea of a complacent shepherd life in Arcadia continues to live on.

== Literature ==
- Cvijić, Jovan, Das Karstphänomen. Versuch eine morphologischen Monographie. in: Geographische Abhandlungen A. Penck, (Hrsg), Bd. V, Heft 3, Wien 1893. German
- Jacobshagen, Volker (ed), Geologie von Griechenland, Beiträge zur regionalen Geologie der Erde, Stuttgart, 1986. German/English
- Pausanias, Description of Greece, English Translation by W.H.S. Jones + H.A. Ormerod, London, 1918.
- Morfis, A. (Athens), Zojer, H. (Graz). Karst Hydrogeology of the Central and Eastern Peloponnesus (Greece). Steirische Beiträge zur Hydrogeologie 37/38. 301 Seiten, Graz 1986.
- Lehmann, Herbert, in Fuchs, F., (ed), Karstphänomene in Nordmediterranen Raum, (1973), Beiträge zur Karstmorphologie, Herbert Lehmann; Reprint noch aktueller Beiträge, Stuttgart 1987 German
- Ford, D. C. and Williams, P.W., Karst Geomorphology and Hydrology, London 1989.
- Mariolakos, Ilias. The Argon Field in Arcadia, the sinkhole of Nestani, God Poseidon and the submarine Dini Springs in the A Argolic Gulf (Peloponnisos, Greece). A geomythological approach of the Poseidon's birth. Bulletin of the Geological Society of Greece, Proceedings of the 10th International Congress, Thessaloniki, April 2004.
- COST 621, Final Report, Groundwater Management of coastal karst aquifers, Brussels 2005.
- Gunn, J., Encyclopedia of caves and karst Science, New York, N.Y., 2005.
- Pentecost, A., Travertine. Springer-Verlag, Berlin Heidelberg 2005.
- Ford, D. C. and Williams, P., Karst Hydrogeology and Geomorphology, Chichester, 2007, 4th, rev. ed.
- P. Fleury, M. Bakalowicz, G. de Marsily: Submarine springs and coastal karst aquifers: A review. In: Journal of Hydrology. Amsterdam 2007, S. 339.
- Mariolakos, Ilias. Geomythological Sites and Prehistoric geotechnical and hydraulic Works in Arkadia, 12th International Congress of the Geological Society of Greece, Field Trip Guide, Patras May 2010, Greek
