= Kapsas =

Kapsas Κάψας
- Community
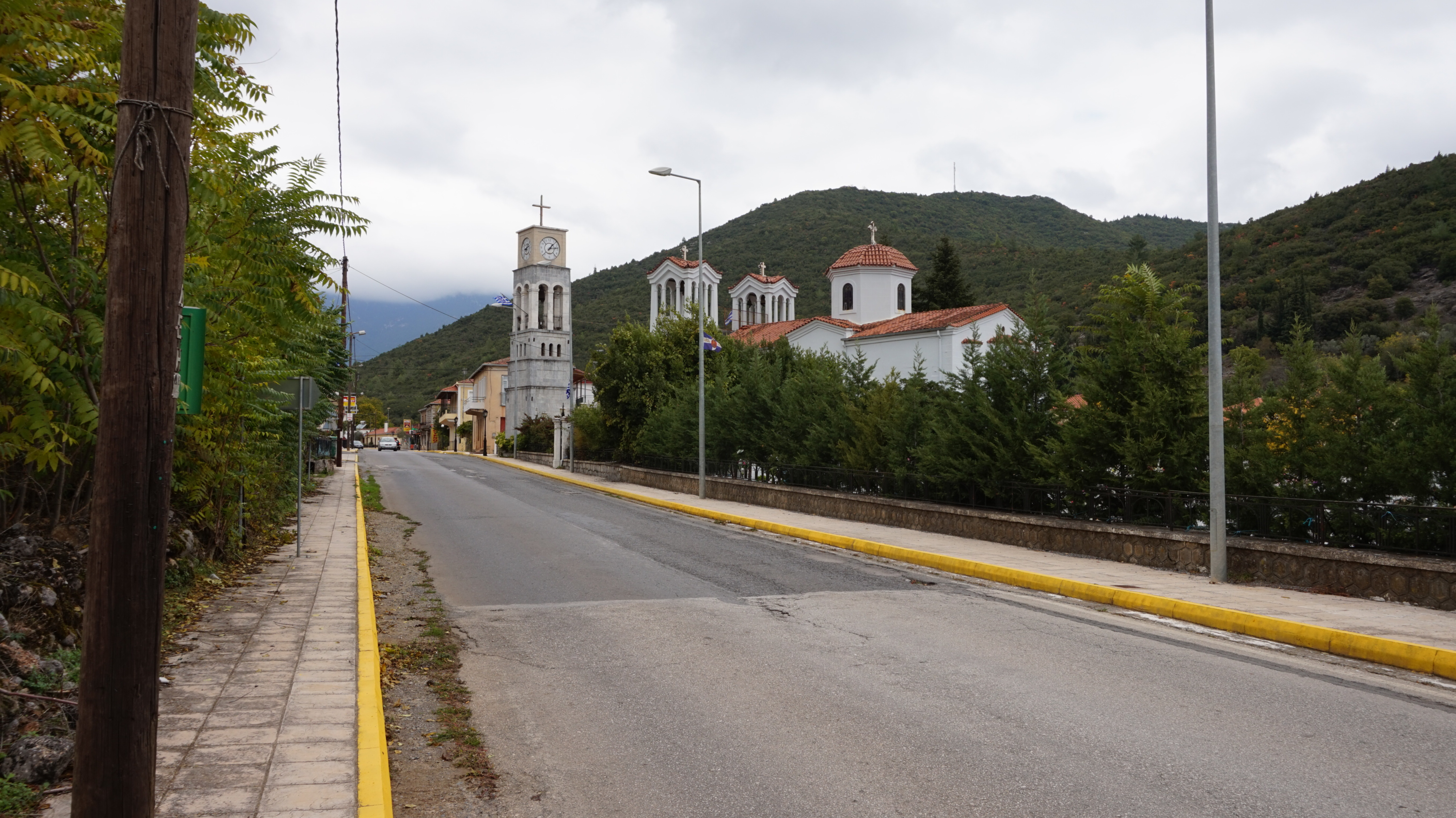

- Location within Greece
- Coordinates: 37°37′N 22°21′E
- Country: Greece
- Administrative region: Peloponnese
- Regional unit: Arcadia
- Municipality: Tripoli
- Municipal unit: Mantineia
- Elevation: 700 m (2,300 ft)

Population (2021)
  - Community: 252
- Time zone: UTC+2 (EET)
  - Summer (DST): UTC+3 (EEST)
- Postal code: 221 00
- Area code: 2710
- Vehicle registration: TP

Kapsas (Greek: Κάψας, also Κάψια Kapsia) is a community in the municipal unit of Mantineia in Arcadia on the Peloponnese peninsula in southern Greece. It is situated in a valley east of the Mainalo mountains, at 700 m elevation. It is 9 km southeast of Levidi, 11 km west of Nestani and 12 km north of Tripoli. The Greek National Road 74 (Pyrgos - Tripoli) passes through the village.

== Historical population ==
Year	Population
1981	581
1991	460
2001	505
2011	389
2021	252

== History ==
During World War II, and after the capitulation of Italy, Greece was occupied by Nazi Germany. Villagers of Kapsas helped an Italian soldier named Salvatore hide from the Germans and return to his native Italy. Statues of the school teacher Ioannis Orfanos, his wife and his brother have been erected near the village church in memory of their aid.

== Attractions ==
The village church of Saint Nicholas possesses a precious icon, donated by the Moscow Patriarchate.

The Cave of Kapsia is situated 1 kilometer from the village Kapsia, at the southwest edge of the plain of ancient Mantineia. It is part of a system of active and inactive sinks (ponors) (Greek: katavothra "Καταβόθρα"). In front of the entrance are three ponors. Inside the cave human bone material has been found, according to some researchers from people who drowned during floods in the cave. The cave was used by man during the Neolithic, Hellenistic period and the fourth to sixth century AD.

== See also ==
- List of settlements in Arcadia
