= Mantinea =

Municipal unit in Greece; ancient city in Arcadia, Greece

Mantinea Μαντίνεια
- Municipal unit
- Location within the regional unit

- Location within Greece
- Coordinates: 37°37′3.51″N 22°23′34.33″E
- Country: Greece
- Administrative region: Peloponnese
- Regional unit: Arcadia
- Municipality: Tripoli

Area
  - Municipal unit: 205.393 km^{2} (79.303 sq mi)
- Elevation: 600 m (2,000 ft)

Population (2021)
  - Municipal unit: 1,693
  - Municipal unit density: 8.243/km^{2} (21.35/sq mi)
- Time zone: UTC+2 (EET)
  - Summer (DST): UTC+3 (EEST)
- Postal code: 220 05
- Area code: 2710
- Vehicle registration: TP

Mantinea (/ˌmæntəˈniːə/; Greek: Μαντίνεια Mantineia; also Koine Greek Ἀντιγόνεια Antigoneia) was a city in ancient Arcadia, Greece, which was the site of two significant battles in Classical Greek history.

In modern times it is a former municipality in Arcadia, Peloponnese, Greece. Since the 2011 local government reform it is part of the municipality Tripoli, of which it is a municipal unit. Its seat was the village of Nestani (pop. 486 in 2011). It is located in the northeastern part of Arcadia. The municipal unit has a land area of 205.393 km^{2} and a population of 1,693 inhabitants (2021). Its largest other towns are Artemisio, Loukas, and Kapsas.

== History ==
The city emerged from the amalgamation of several neighbouring villages around 500 BC. Its patron god was Poseidon. It was a large city with numerous temples. The fortifications originally were polygonal. The temple of Artemis Hymnia, just on the north of the city, is mentioned by Pausanias. Diotima, who influenced Socrates, supposedly was a priestess there. Near the city was the dam of Mantineia, one of the most advanced examples of ancient technology.

The city was the place of the First Battle of Mantineia, in 418 BC, the largest land battle of the Peloponnesian War. On one side were Sparta and its remaining allies, and on the other were Athens, its allies, plus the cities that had revolted against the Spartans. After the Athenians' commander, Laches, was killed, the battle turned into a rout of the Athenian and allied armies, a result attributed to greater Spartan courage.

Mantineia had been a member of the Peloponnesian League, but during the Peloponnesian War, the city joined Athens. After the war, it was forced to rejoin the Peloponnese. Later, Sparta used the Peace of Antalcidas (387 BC) as a pretext to break Mantineia into its constituent villages. In response, the Mantineans expelled pro-Spartans from the city, but were vanquished in the Siege of Mantinea (385 BC), and the city was dismembered and destroyed. After the Spartan defeat at the end of the Theban–Spartan War, Mantineia re-formed into a single city. The fortifications now became almost oval, keeping some parts of the old walls.

The Second Battle of Mantinea, in 362 BC, led to the fall of Theban hegemony. In that battle, Athens and Sparta were allied. Thebes won the battle, but its greatest general, Epaminondas, was killed in the fighting.

Macedonian king Antigonus III Doson sacked the city at 223 BC. Antigonus handed the city to the Achaeans, which colonized it, under Aratus of Sicyon, and renamed the city to Antigonia.

Roman emperor Hadrian restored Mantineia's name. In 130 AD he visited the city and built a temple dedicated to his lover Antinous.

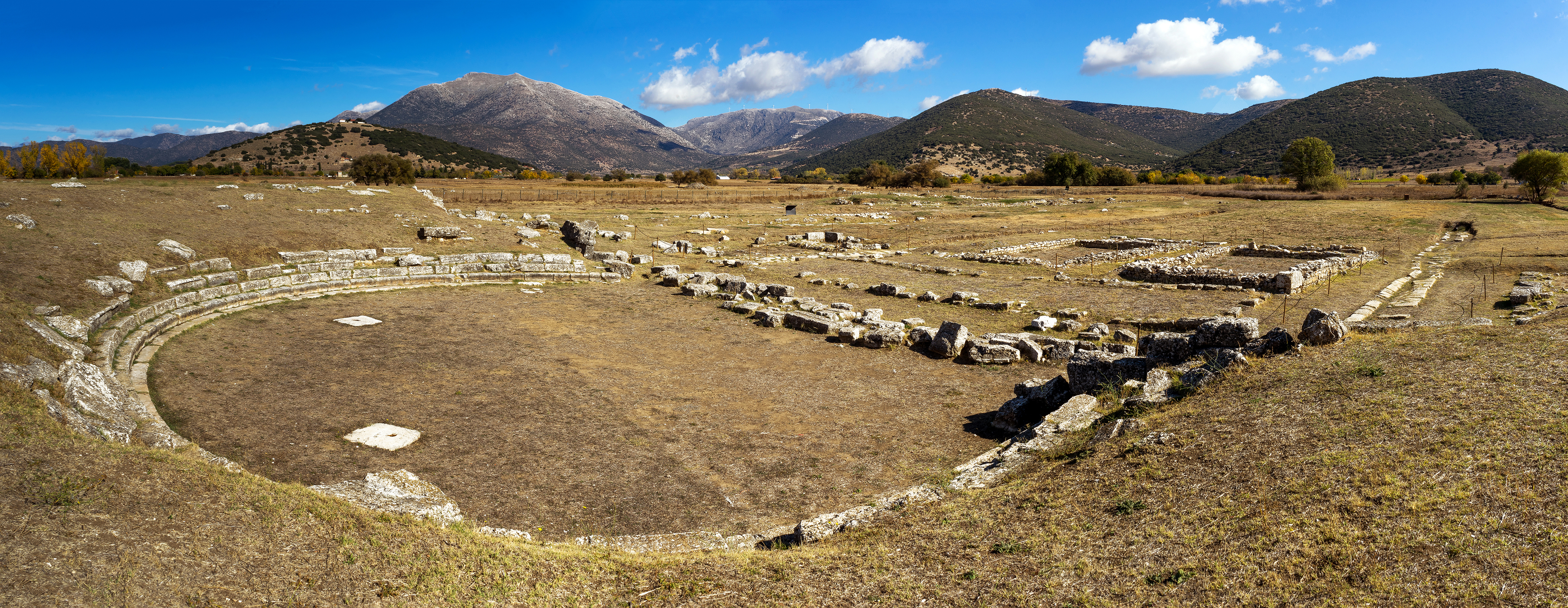
Ancient theater of Mantineia

Some decades later, probably few years before 166 AD, Pausanias visited the area and described the ruins and remains of the city at the time in his 8th book.

Modern-day Mantineia is the region around the city of Tripoli in Arcadia, and was named after the namesake city of old. It is also the name of a Protected designation of origin of Greek blanc de gris wine, made of the moschofilero grape traditionally grown in the region. The seat of Mantineia is Nestani, home to about one-fifth (20%) of the population.

Mountains surround the valley, including the Lyrkeia mountains as well as the Mainalo mountains to the southwest. The valley consists of vineyards, potato and wheat farms, as well as other crops, and covers about half of the municipality. Several floods ravaged Mantineia in the mid-20th century, even to the extent of forming a lake that has since been drained. Forests dominate the mountains. Rocks and grasslands cover most of the northeast.

The Mantineia Marble, dated to the 4th century BC and now exhibited at National Archaeological Museum of Athens, depicts the mythical contest between Apollo and Marsyas, with a Greek pandouris being played by a muse seated on a rock. This is important to researchers into the history of musical instruments. Lutes have been present in ancient Greece.

== Democracy in Mantineia ==
There was a democracy in place in Mantineia by 420 BC, when Thucydides says that the Mantineans joined an alliance led by Argos because it was a fellow democracy. Aristotle describes an unusual feature of the Mantinean system: officials were elected, not by the people as a whole, but by a special committee selected by the people. For this committee to be selected, the people had to attend an Assembly of sorts, probably once a year, and there was also a Council, like in other Greek democracies. Officials included damiourgoi (a political role) as well as theoroi (a religious one) and polemarchoi (military). In 385 the Spartans forcibly suppressed the democracy, though it did have a brief revival in the 360s when Mantineia was part of the Arcadian League.

== Subdivisions ==
The municipal unit Mantineia is subdivided into the following communities (constituent villages in brackets):

- Artemisio
- Kapsas
- Loukas (Loukas, Milia)
- Nestani (Nestani, Milea, Gorgoepikoos Monastery)
- Pikernis
- Sanga
- Simiades (Simiades, Neos Kardaras)

== Province ==
The province of Mantineia (Greek: Επαρχία Μαντινείας) was one of the provinces of the Arcadia Prefecture. Its territory corresponded with that of the current municipality Tripoli. Its seat was the town of Tripoli. It was abolished in 2006.

== Historical population ==
| Year | Municipal unit |
|---|---|
| 1991 | 3,628 |
| 2001 | 3,510 |
| 2011 | 2,114 |
| 2021 | 1,693 |

== Folk music ==
Mantineian folk music mainly consists of the songs with meters 6/4, 4/4 and 7/8.These meters are often the building blocks of the Mantineian folk dances: Tsamiko, Syrto, and Kalamatiano respectively. The meter 7/8, is the most common meter found in the province.

=== Types of folk songs ===
==== Klephtic songs ====
Klephtic songs are about a historical event and the hardships specific villages went through. Klephtic songs are free-meter songs and they can be in chromatic or/and diatonic modes.

==== Wedding songs ====
Wedding songs can differ from village to village, and the major steps of weddings are followed by music: Patinadha is played with daouli and karamoutza announcing the time for the ceremony to the village, "My Venetian Padlock" sang by the bride when her dowry is displayed after the wedding, when going to her future home, a Kandhylian melody is being played, and at the reception "Sitting at this Wedding Table" is sung by the priest for blessing.

==== Road songs ====
Road songs gets its name from the occasion they were sung, which was on the road by the workers who were going back to their home. Unlike Wedding songs, road songs are not different in each village, instead, the dances for the songs do differ with either a Syrto or Kalamatiano. Road songs usually are happy songs that talk about love and nature.

==== Laments or Mirologhia songs ====
Laments are sung often by widows, only women, and include positive thoughts about the deceased in the province of Mantinea. There is not much of a recording of laments since it is believed to bring death to a loved one of the person who sang it without a reason.

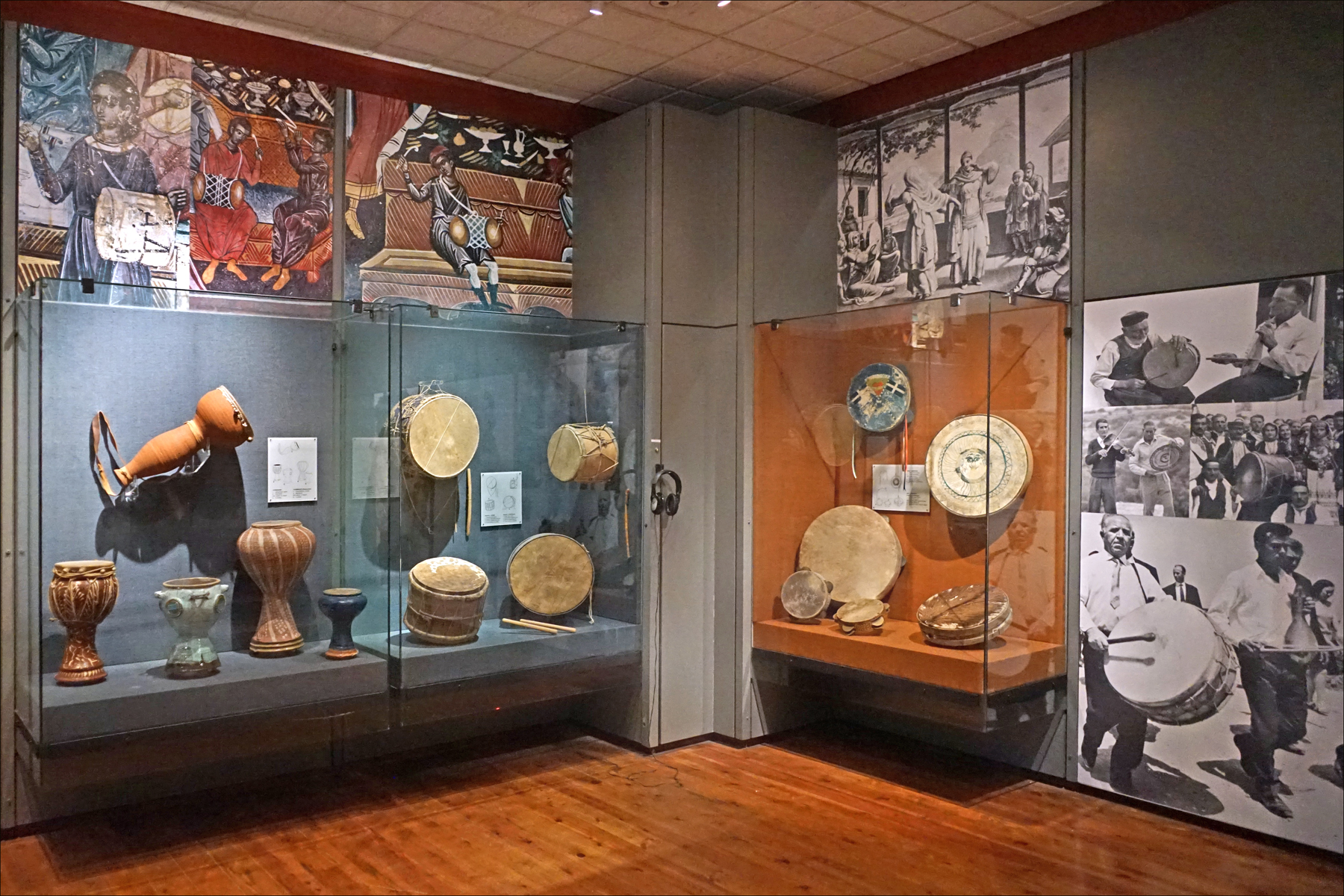
Museum of Greek Folk Musical Instruments (Athens)

=== Folk musical instruments ===
There were many musical instruments in ancient Greece, however, daouli and karamoutza are the most common instruments existed in the villages of the province Mantineia. Some regions similar to Chrisovitsi, didn't have these folk instruments. The folk music of Chrisovitsi mostly consisted of vocal songs and the instrument floghera. With the tradition of dance songs sang by the lead dancer in Chrisovitsi, there is no evidence of existence of any folk instruments.

== Notable people ==
- Demonax, lawgiver (6th century BC)
- Nicodorus, lawgiver (5th century BC)
- Diotima, female philosopher identified in Plato's Symposium
- Lastheneia, female philosopher and student of Plato
- Lycomedes, politician (died 366 BC)

== See also ==
- List of ancient Greek cities
- List of settlements in Arcadia
