= Damophon =

Ancient Greek sculptor

Damophon (Ancient Greek: Δαμοφῶν; fl. 2nd century BC) was an ancient Greek sculptor of the Hellenistic period from Messene, known for his many acroliths found in Messene, Megalopolis, Aegium, Lycosura and other cities of the Peloponnesus. Other cities beyond the Peloponnese that Damophon was admired include Leucas, Cephallenia, Kynthos, Melos and Oiantheia.

There has been some debate surrounding the dating of Damophon's statues with historians attributing him to anywhere between the 4th c. BC to the 2nd c. AD. However, recent work at Messene where others of Damophon's sculptures have been found, indicate a date around 180 BC for his floruit.

While much of Damophon's life remains unknown, Pausanias writes of his prevalence in Greek sculpture well into the 2nd c. AD. More information about the life of Damophon, and about his work for various other Greek cities, has been provided by an inscription found at Messene, which was uncovered by archaeologists in two parts, in 1972 and 1989.

== Works ==
All of the discovered works attributed to Damophon are cult acroliths. Damophon did not sign his any of his sculptures, inscribing them with dedications to the Gods. Most works attributed to Damophon were mentioned in Pausinias' Description of Greece, including acroliths of Apollo and the Muses, Herakles, Hermes, and Aphrodite among others. Written of by Pausanias and discovered at a sanctuary of the Goddess Despoina on the site of Lycosura in Arcadia in 1889, significant fragments, including three colossal heads from a collection depicting Demeter, Persephone, Artemis and the Titan Anytos are attributed to Damophon. Utilizing a neoclassical style, these fragments are all of a religious purpose and are made of marble instead of the commonly used bronze. They were preserved in part in the National Archaeological Museum of Athens and partly at a small museum on the archaeological site. Damophon is also known for his restoration of Phidias' statue of the Greek god Zeus at Olympia, which had been damaged in an earthquake around 183 BC.

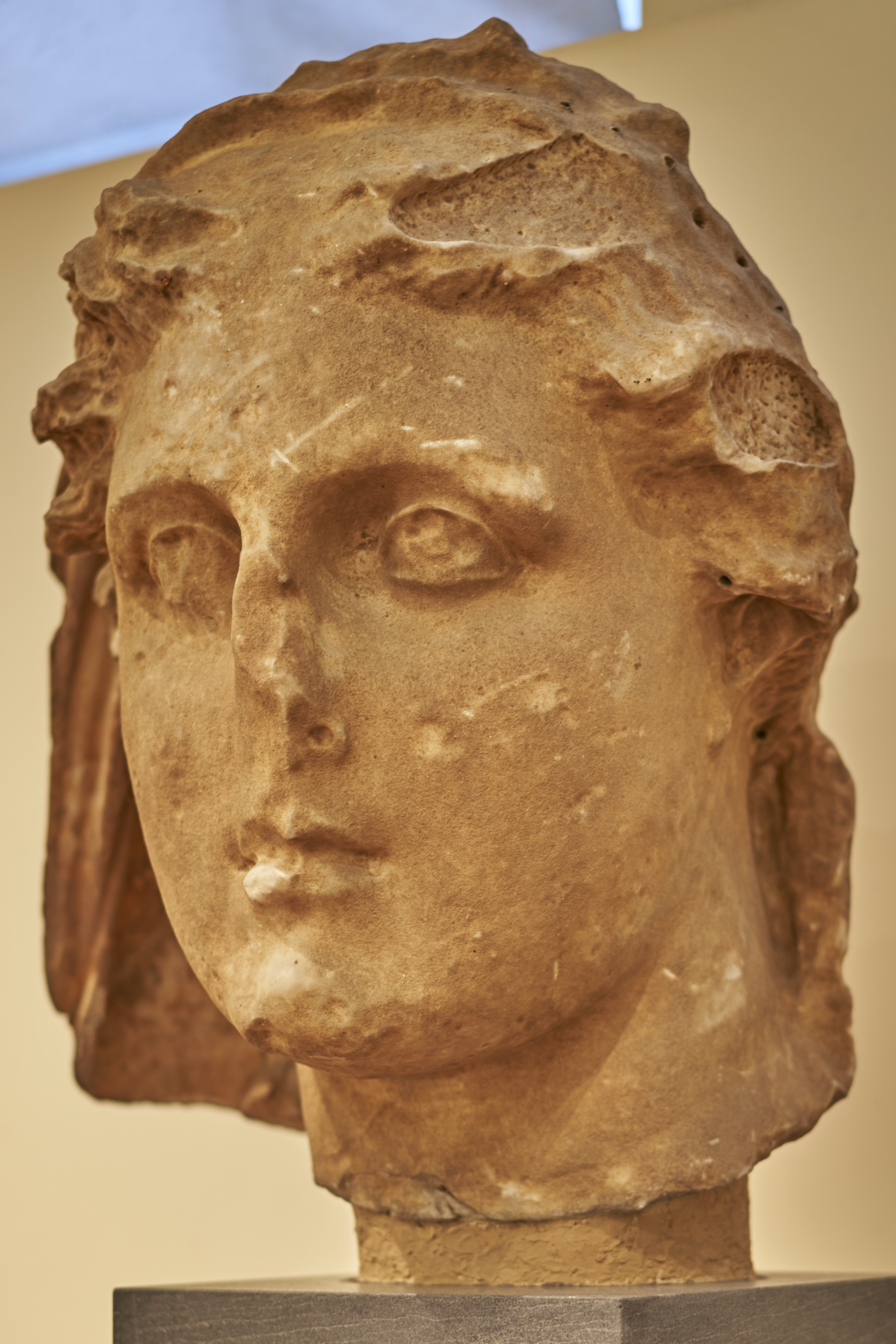
The Head of Demeter

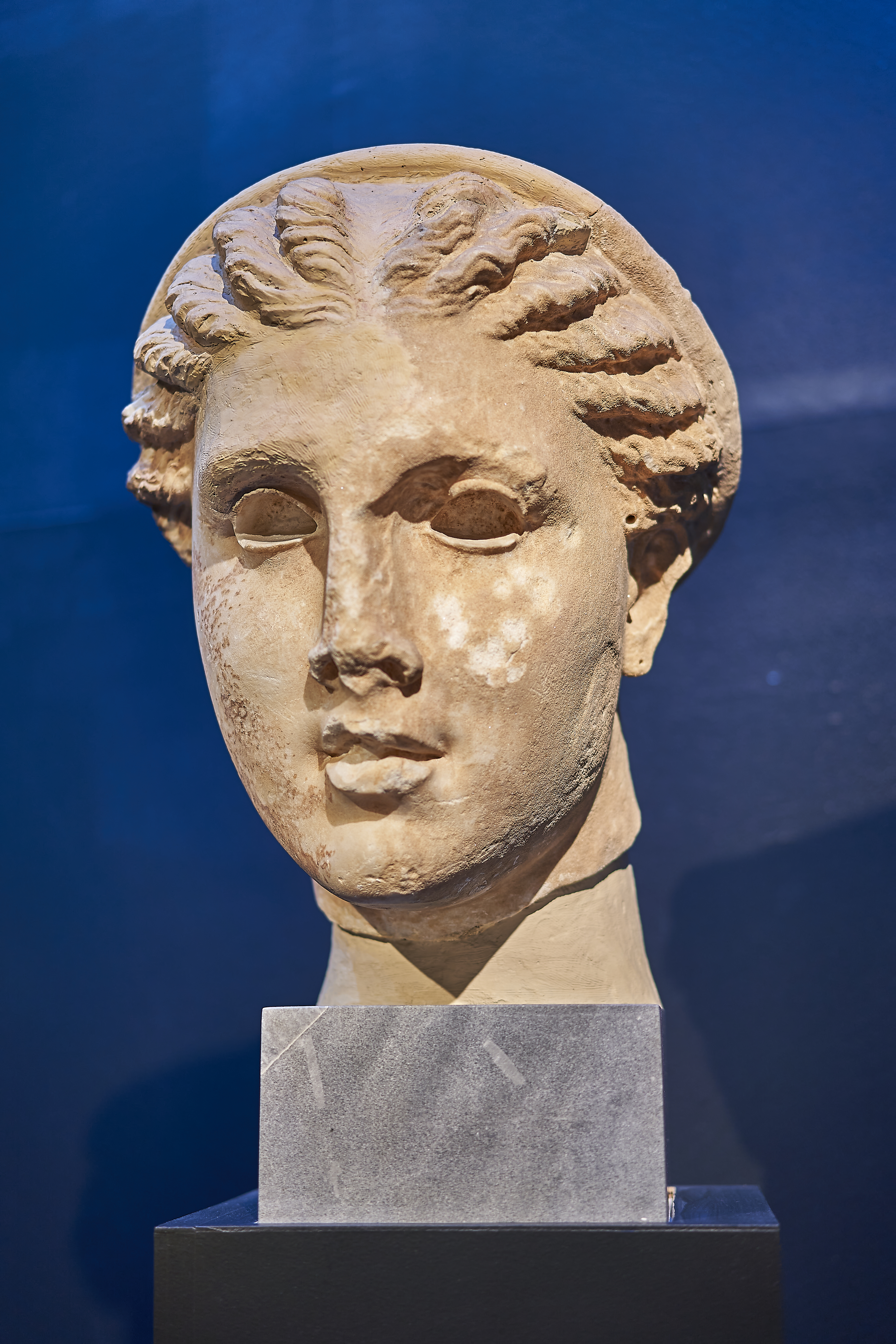
The Head of Artemis

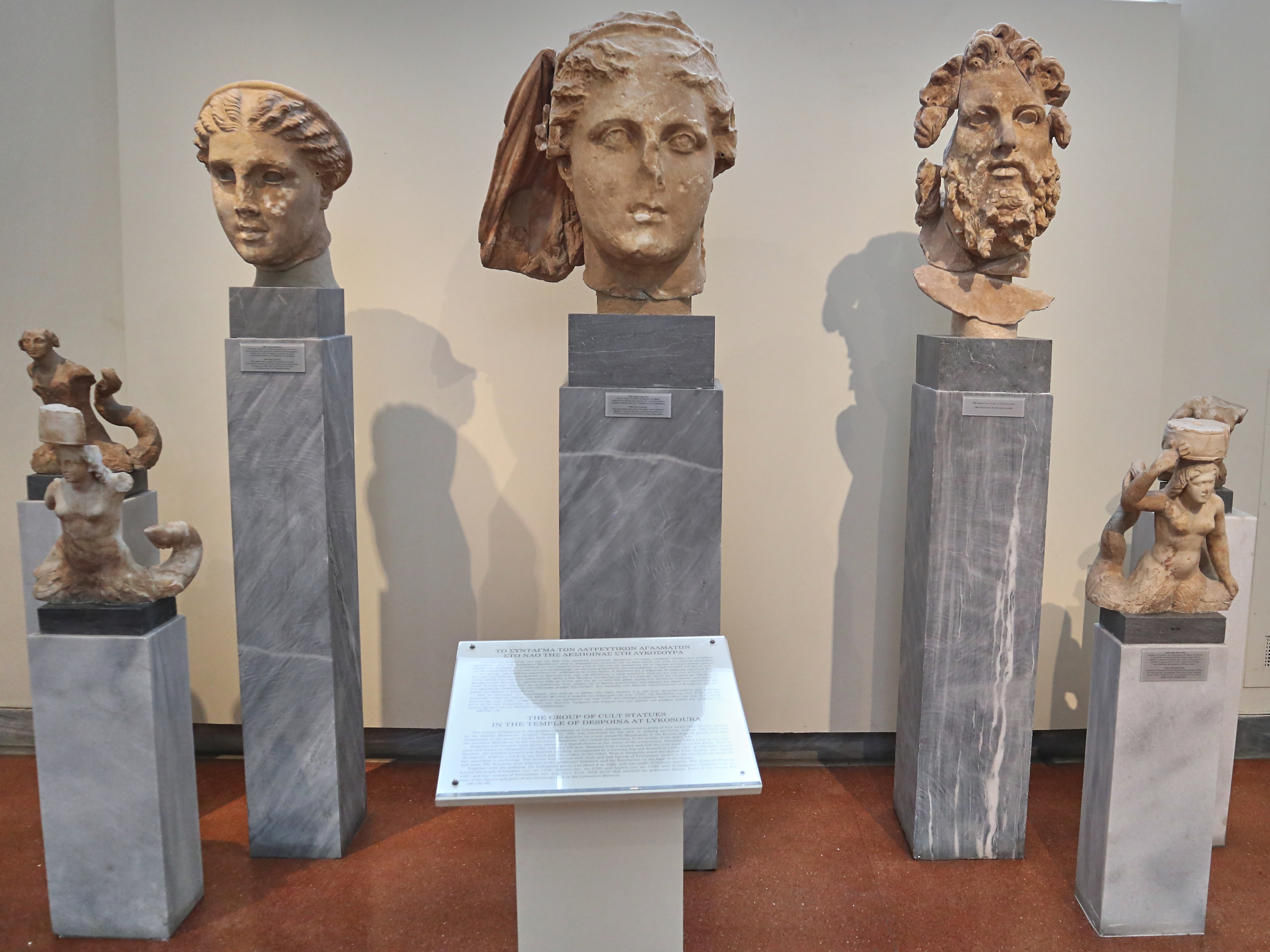
Collection of Acrolith Fragments from the Sanctuary of Despoina at Lykosoura, Arcadia

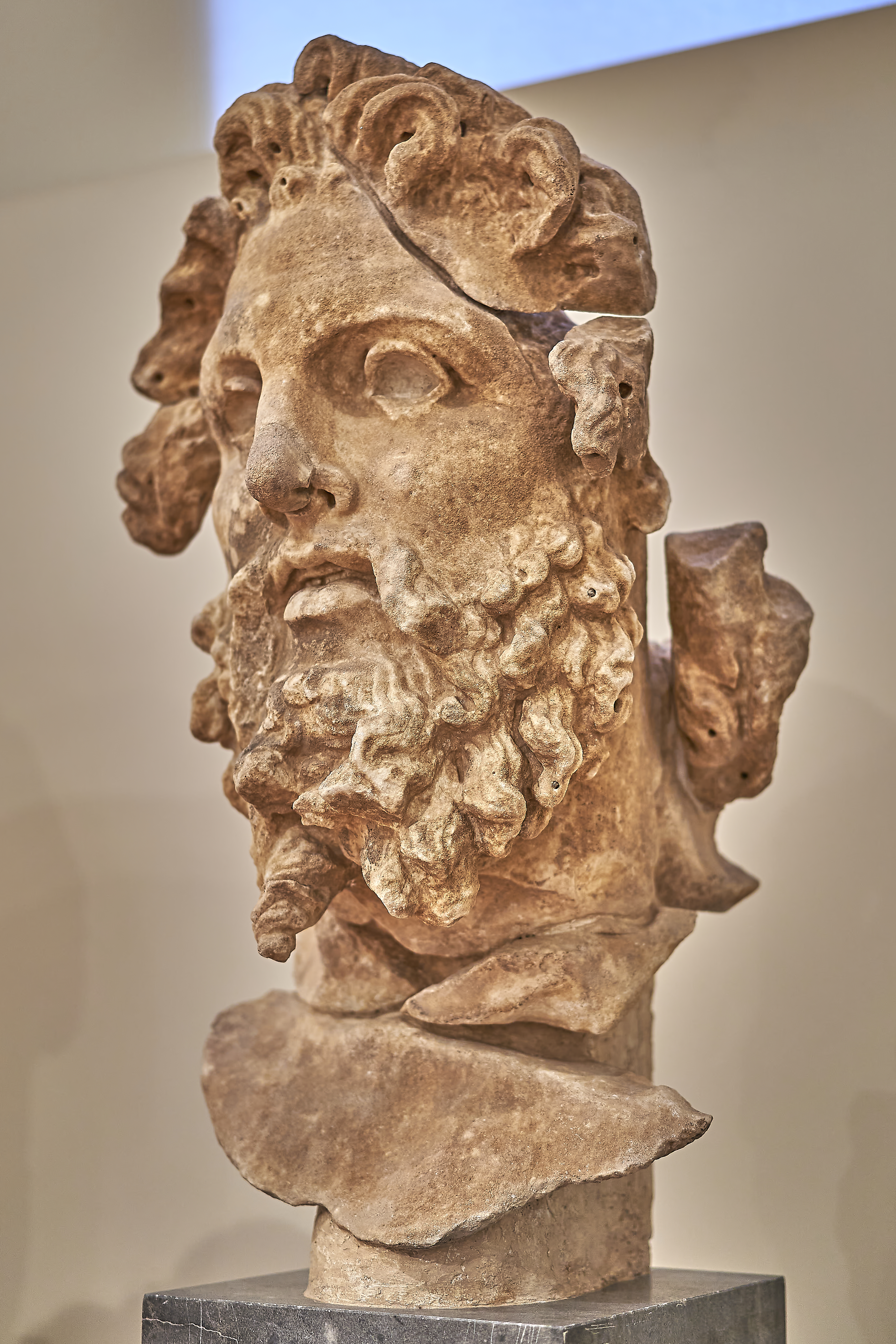
The Head of Titan Anytos

== Inscriptions ==
Several inscriptions have been found on a Doric column in Messene, praising Damophon for his contributions to various cities. Never taking payments for his works and using materials provided to him, Damophon was celebrated for his piety and humility. In return for his repeated kindness and public service in his artwork, the cities of Lycosura, Kythnos, Leucas, and Oiantheia deemed Damophon proxenos.

He shall be a proxenos and benefactor of the city of Kythnos, both himself and his descendants; and they shall have the right to own both land and buildings; and they shall have freedom from taxes, and inviolability both in war and in peacetime, and the other privileges that are given to the other proxenoi and benefactors of the city. The ephors with ... shall inscribe this award of proxeny on a stone stele, and they shall set it up in the temple 120 of Aphrodite.

— Decree of the Kythnians, Inscription at Messene

All of the Inscriptions include an instruction that a bronze statue or stone stele be placed at a prominent temple to honor his award of proxeny. The column itself was a tribute to Damophon and likely supported a statue.
