= Lycosoura Demeter =

Hellenistic statue of Demeter from the city of Lycosoura, created by Damophon in 180 BC

Lycosoura Demeter (NAMA 1734)
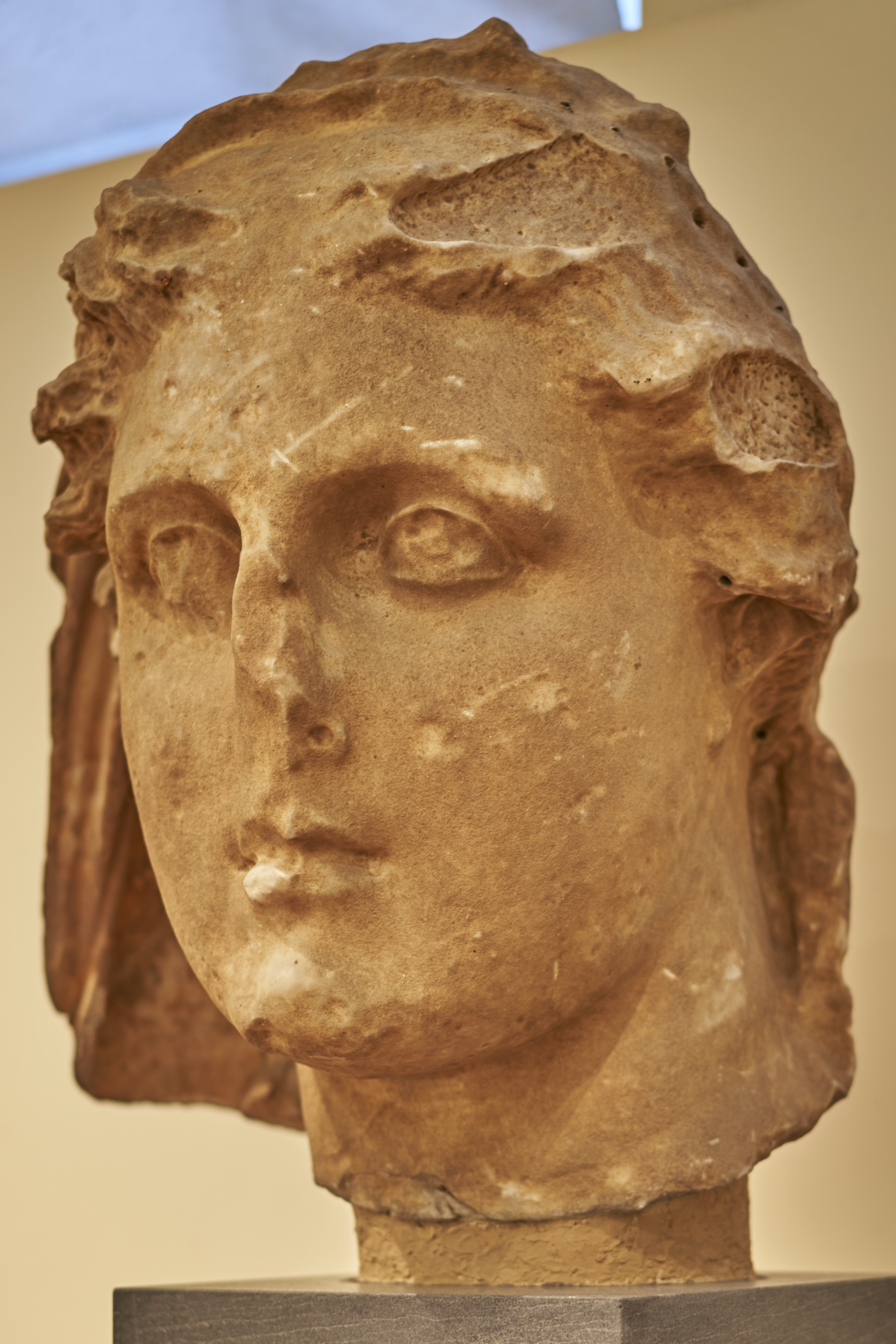
- created by Damophon
- Type: Colossal Bust
- Material: Doliana marble
- Height: 75 cm
- Created: 180 BC
- Discovered: 1889; Lycosura; 37°23′23"N 22°01′52"E
- Place: National Archaeological Museum of Athens
- Present location: Athens, Greece
- Identification: NAMA 1734
- Culture: Hellenistic

The Lycosoura Demeter is a remnant of a colossal sculpture of Demeter, created by the sculptor Damophon in 180 BC for the Temple of Despoina in the ancient city of Lycosura, now Arcadia, Greece.

It is part of a mini-pantheon prominent in the city, which also includes the goddess Artemis, the Titan Anytos, and the goddess Desponia, the "Mistress", whose true name remains unknown, according to the historian Pausanias, who catalogued the region in his book Description of Greece (Ἑλλάδος Περιήγησις, Hellados Periegesis).

The cult statues was believed to be about 6 meters in height, and the depiction of the deities were also documented on Roman provincial currency issued by the city of Megalopolis.

The bust is currently housed by the National Archaeological Museum, alongside the bust of Artemis, designated NAMA 1734.

== Discovery ==
The city of Lycosura is 7 km west of Megalopolis, which was studied extensively in the Summer of 1889, and the turn of the century. The sanctuary of Despoina was recovered, and with it the fragments of Artemis, Anytos, the chest/robe of Despoina.

The bust is an acrolith, a composite of many different materials, of which the head, hands, and feet are made of local marble, but the chest and clothing are made of wood.

The heads of Demeter, Artemis, and Anytos were transferred to the museum (as 1734, 1735, and 1736 respectively), along with a portion of Despoina's mantle (no. 1737). Torsos and arms of the figures are kept at the local Lycosura Museum.

== Description ==
Measuring 75 cm, and unlike the statue of Artemis, whose eyes are inlaid, the Demeter's face is carved in one piece, with a veil that remains well preserved. The hair is coiffed in wavy tresses, and with it holes are carved into the head meant for the placement of a metal diadem. As a matron Demeter carries a queen-like presence and is one of the main objects of attention in the pantheon.

The description from what Pausanias gathered indicated that Demeter would have held a torch in right hand and her left laying on the Despoina statue, both of whom would share a throne and a footstool made out of a block of marble.

Given the nature of a Persephone kore found in the sanctuary nearby, the deities of the shrine are seen to be that of a Chthonic nature, a part of the Eleusinian Mysteries.

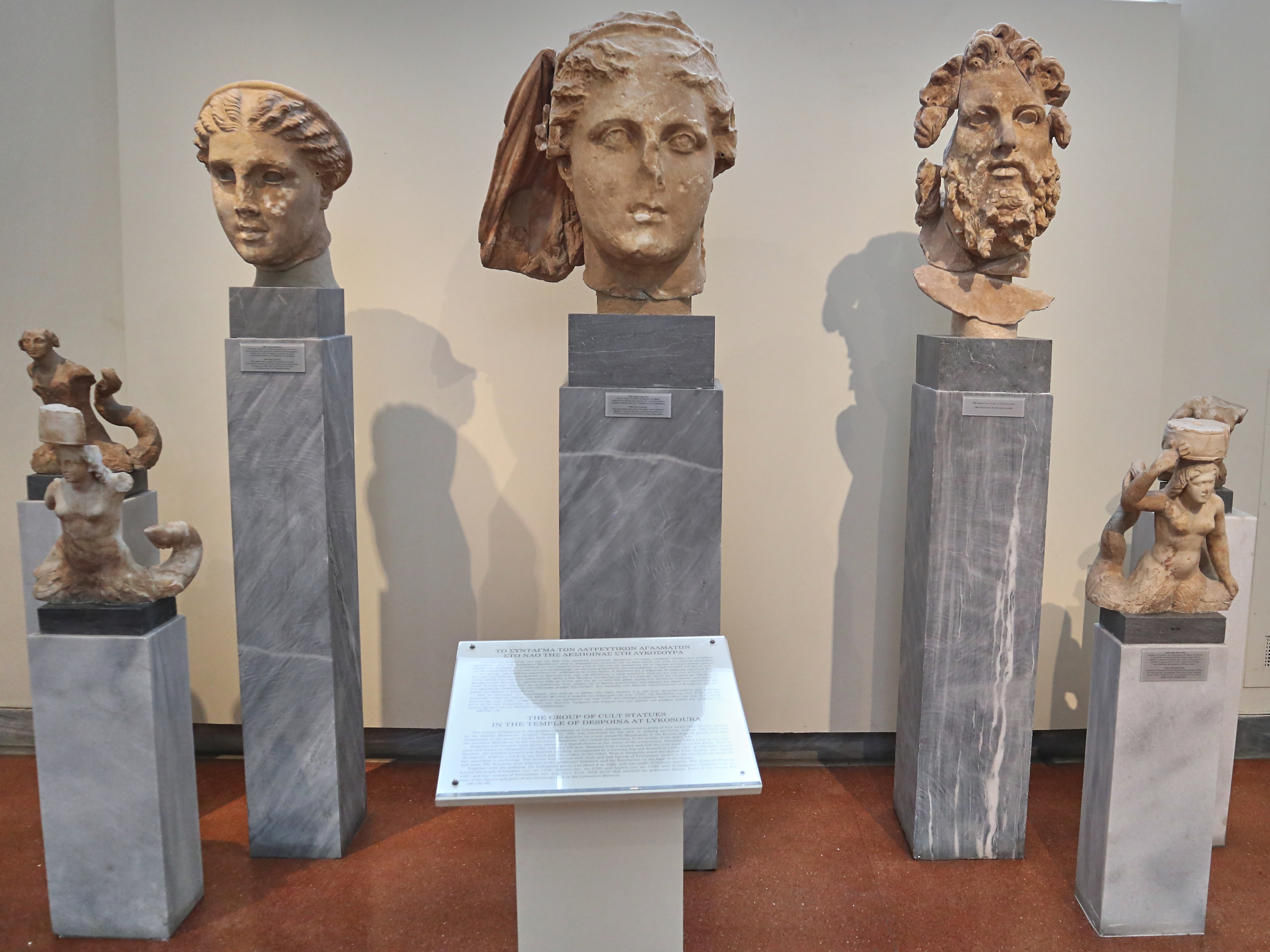
The Despoina Pantheon, arranged at the NAMA in 2018.
