= Lycosoura Artemis =

Remnant of a sculpture of Artemis

Lykosoura Artemis (NAMA 1735)
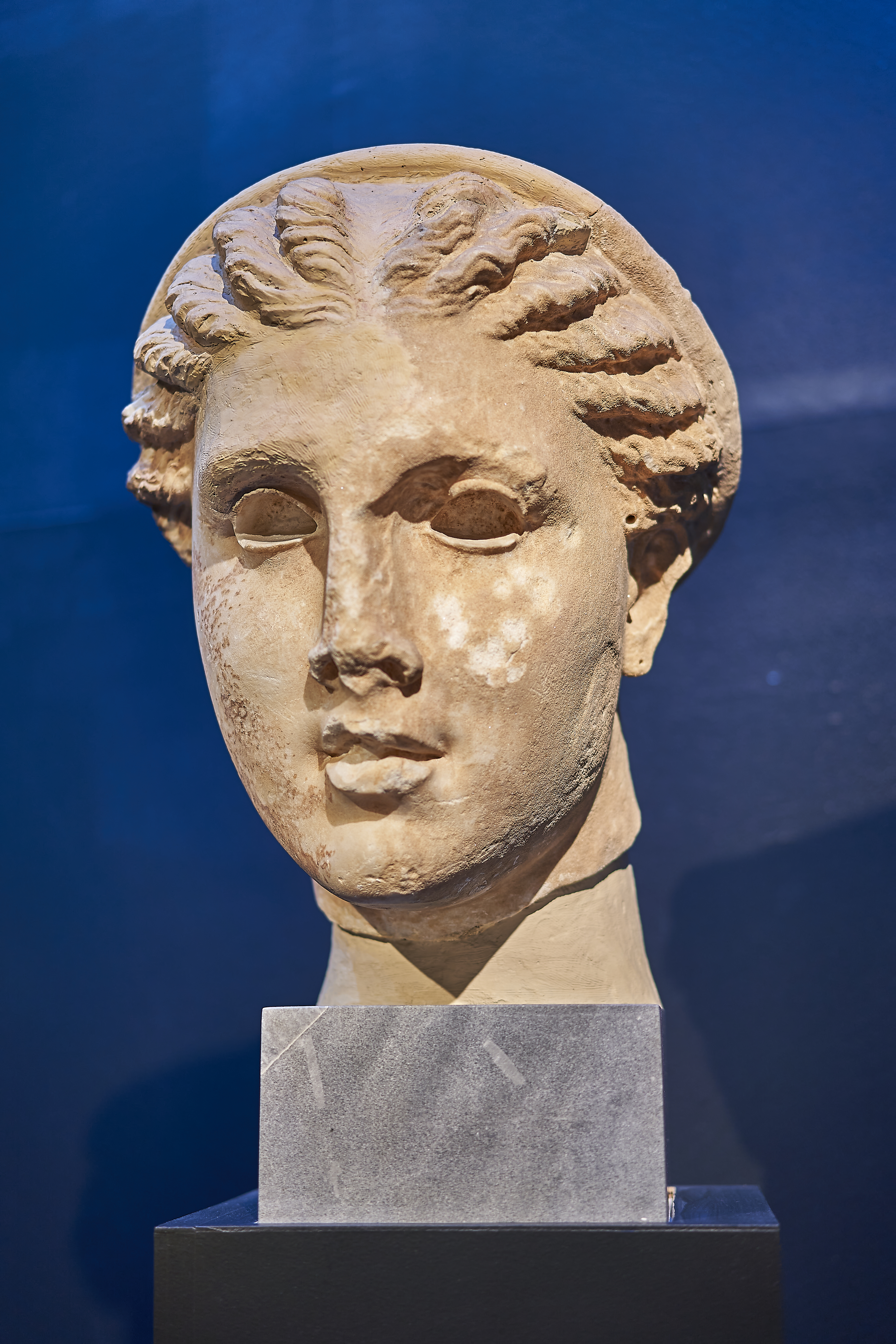
- created by Damophon
- Type: Colossal bust
- Material: Doliana marble
- Height: 48 cm
- Created: 180 BC
- Discovered: 1889; Lycosura; 37°23′23″N 22°01′52″E
- Place: National Archaeological Museum of Athens
- Present location: Athens, Greece
- Culture: Hellenistic

The Lycosoura Artemis is the remnant of a colossal sculpture of Artemis, created in the Hellenistic period and discovered in Lycosura, present day Arcadia, Greece.

The bust is an acrolith, a composite of many different materials, and is attributed to the sculptor Damophon, who was prominent in the Peloponnese in the early portion of the 2nd century B.C.

Artemis was worshipped alongside Demeter, the Titan Anytos, and Despoina (The Mistress) whose name remains unknown. The historian Pausanias documented the life of Damophon as well as the temple itself and their religious adherents.

Discovered in excavations in the Summer of 1889, the bust is currently housed at the National Archaeological Museum, Athens under the designation NAMA 1735.

== Discovery ==
The 1889 excavations of the Temple of Desponia unveiled the statue along with the accompanying sculpture fragments of Demeter, Despoina, and Anytos helmed by M. Cavvadias. The main sculptures of the god and goddesses was then placed at the National Archaeological Museum, with the other finds placed at a local museum in Lycosura.

The presence with of a kore of Persephone along with the accompanying entities indicates localized chthonic worship.

== Description ==
The height of the bust is measured at 48 cm, but based upon the fragments of the other gods and goddesses of the Temple of Despoina, it is estimated the sculptures likely measured at 5.6 meters and 8.4 meters wide. Pausanias noted that Artemis would be standing besides that of Desponia and Demeter, both of whose fragments also reside at the National Archaeological Museum.

As an acrolith, Pausanias documented Damophon's sculptures and other pieces within the Peloponnese that had marble heads, hands, and feet, but with the body being made of wood.

Artemis would be depicted wearing fawn skin and a quiver, torch in one hand, and two serpents on the other. The hair is arranged in a melon coiffure and she wears a wreath. There are holes in the ears, to which earrings would adorn the statue. In addition, the eyes would be inlaid.

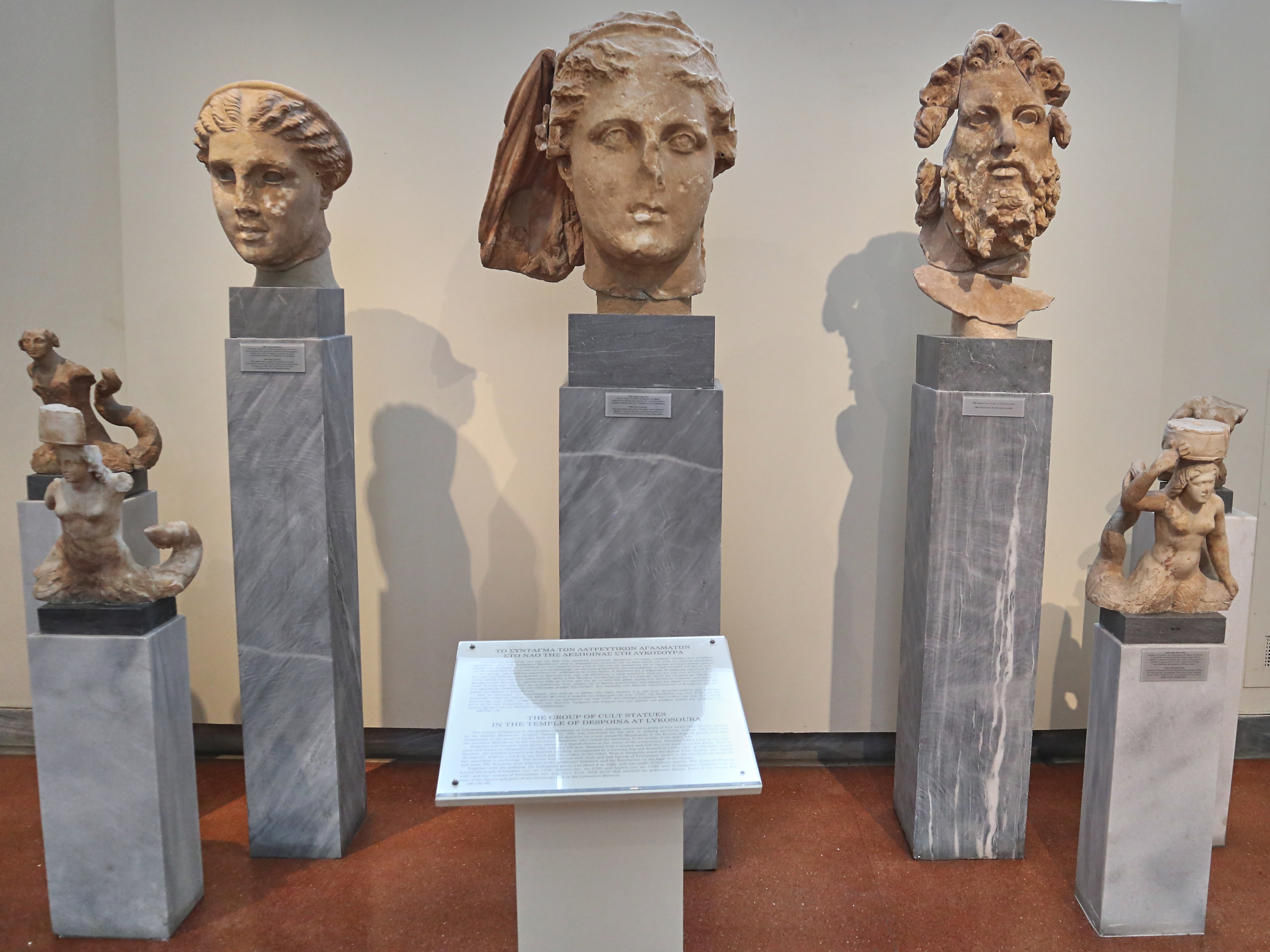
The Temple of Despoina Statues at the NAMA (2018)
