= Petrosaca =

Petrosaca or Petrosaka (Ancient Greek: ἡ Πετροσάκα) was a town in ancient Arcadia, on the road that led from Mantineia to Methydrium. The road passed through the plain Alcimedon, which was 30 stadia from Mantineia, above which was Mount Ostracina; then by the fountain Cissa, and Petrosaca was situated at the distance of 40 stadia from the fountain, on the confines of the Mantineian and Megalopolitan territories.

Its site is unlocated.
