= Nostia =

Nostia (Ancient Greek: Νοστία) was a village of ancient Arcadia mentioned by Stephanus of Byzantium.

Its site is unlocated.
