= Lycosura =

Archaeological site in Greece

- Λυκόσουρα (Ancient Greek)
- Lykosoura, Lycosoura
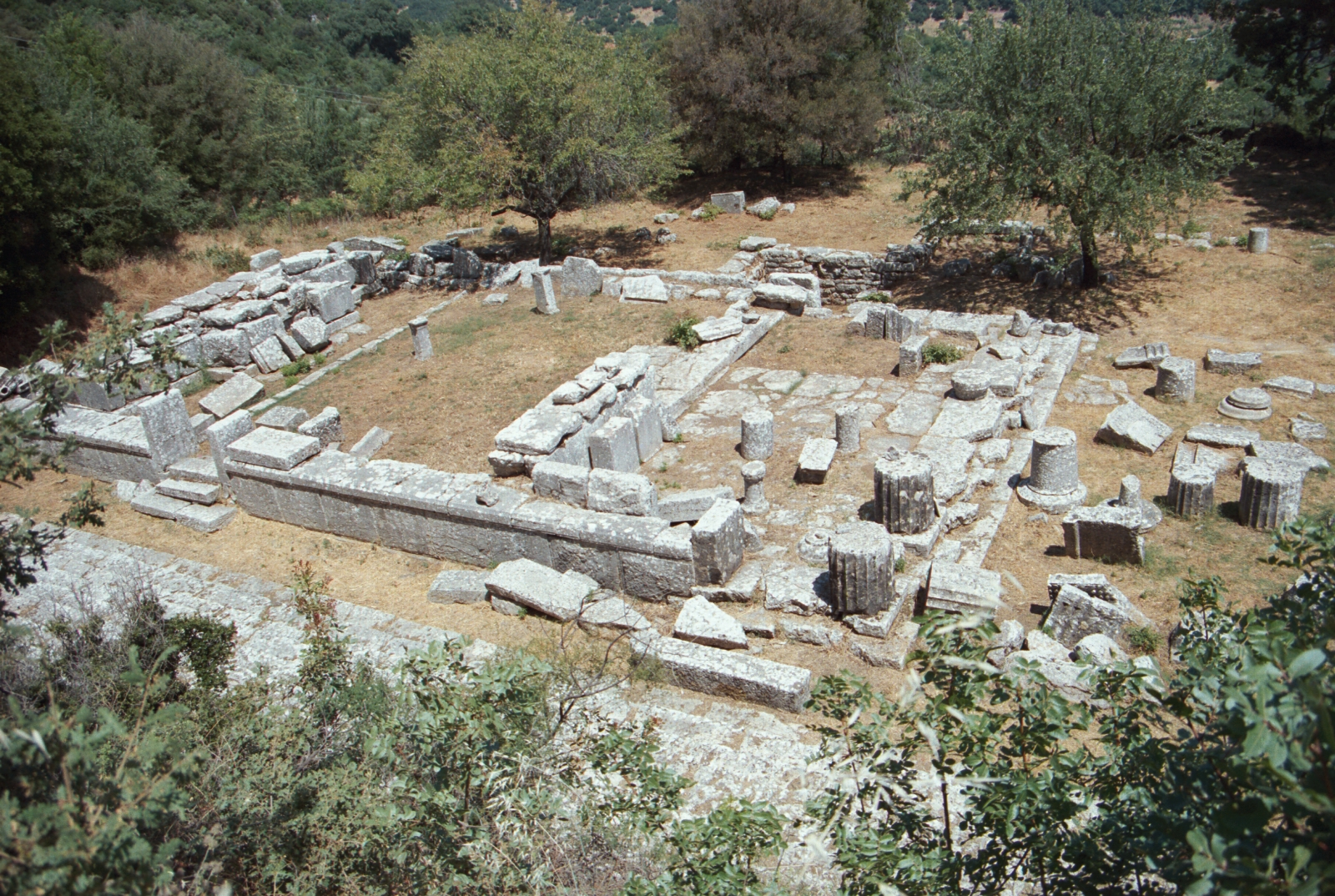
- Temple of Despoina

- Location within Greece
- 37°23′23″N 22°01′52″E
- Type: Settlement
- Periods: Hellenistic to Roman Imperial
- Satellite of: Megalopolis
- Location: Arcadia, Greece (modern)
- Region: Parrhasia region (ancient)

Site notes
- Management: Fifth Ephorate of Prehistoric and Classical Antiquities
- Public access: Yes
- Website: Sanctuary of Despoina at Lykosoura

Lycosura (Ancient Greek: Λυκόσουρα, romanized: Lykósoura) was a city in the ancient Parrhasia region of south Arcadia said by Pausanias to be the oldest city in the world, although there is no evidence for its existence before the fourth century BC. Its current significance is chiefly associated with the sanctuary of the goddess Despoina, which contained a colossal sculptural group that has been found and that Pausanias (perhaps inaccurately) wrote was made by Damophon of Messene. This group comprises acrolithic-technique statues of Despoina and Demeter seated on a throne, with statues of Artemis and the Titan Anytos standing on either side of them, all in Pentelic marble. Remains of a stoa, altars, fountain and baths and other structures can also be seen at the site.

The Sanctuary is located 9 km WSW of Megalopolis, 6.9 km SSE of Mount Lykaion, and 160 km SW of Athens. There is a small museum at the archaeological site housing the middle of sculptured group, Demeter and Despoina, as well as other finds. The other half of the group, Artemis and Titan Anytos, is exhibited at the National Archaeological Museum in Athens.

== Mythology and history ==
The chthonic goddess worshiped by the Arcadians under the title, Despoina (Δέσποινα: the Mistress)(later conflated with Kore) who originally was considered to be the daughter of Poseidon Hippios and Demeter, rather than of Zeus and Demeter as was Kore. Her real name could not be revealed to anyone except those initiated to her mysteries at Lycosura.

In the second century AD Pausanias, relying on personal observations, available texts, and consultation with locals, wrote the only extant account of the ancient city and its sanctuary. He relates that Lycosura was founded by Lycaon the son of Pelasgus, and asserted that it was the oldest city in the world. He notes that Cleitor, the grandson of Arcas (hence the toponym Arcadia), dwelled in Lycosura.

In 368 or 367 BC, when many cities in the region were unified into the city of Megalopolis through persuasion or force, the citizens of Lycosura, Trapezus, Lycaea, and Tricoloni refused to relocate. The citizens of Trapezus were massacred or driven into exile by the Arcadians, but the citizens of Lycosura were spared due to reverence for the Sanctuary of Despoina, where they had sought asylum. Thus, many of the cities of the region were abandoned in favor of Megalopolis and their sanctuaries fell out of use. Pausanias states that the Sanctuary of Despoina was 40 stades (7.4 km) from Megalopolis, which exercised political control over the sanctuary. In the second century AD a statue of the emperor Hadrian was dedicated in the temple. Coins from Megalopolis of the Severan period in the early third century AD appear to depict the cult statue group. Despite its significance to the Arcadians and occasional notice from the wider Mediterranean world, the cult of Despoina appears to have remained tied to this one sanctuary at Lycosura.

== Archaeology ==
=== Overview of the site ===
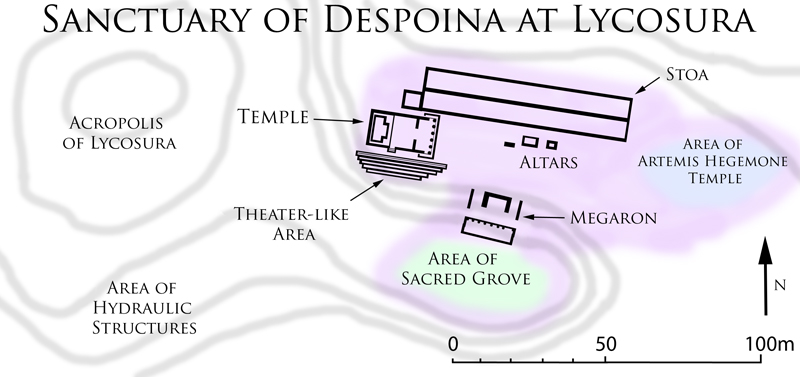
Area shaded purple approximates the sacred precinct

The site of Lycosura occupies a hill of 632 m in the wooded, mountainous region south of the river Plataniston. The Sanctuary of Despoina is sited in a declivity on the north-eastern face of the hill occupied by the city. The temple and considerable remains of the cult statuary group were discovered in 1889 by the Greek Archaeological Service, well before the advent of stratographic excavation techniques. Dating of the finds and structures thus remains problematic. While the site of the city remains largely unexcavated, the sanctuary of Despoina has been uncovered thoroughly and consists of a temple, a stoa, an area of theater-like seats, three altars, and an enigmatic structure conventionally called the Megaron. Pausanias also describes a temple of Artemis Hegemone (Artemis the Leader) at the entrance to the sanctuary on its eastern side. Traces of the temenos wall (boundary of the sacred area) have been detected on the north and the east sides of the sanctuary but the southern and western limits of the sacred area are unknown.

=== Temple of Despoina, Stoa, and altars ===
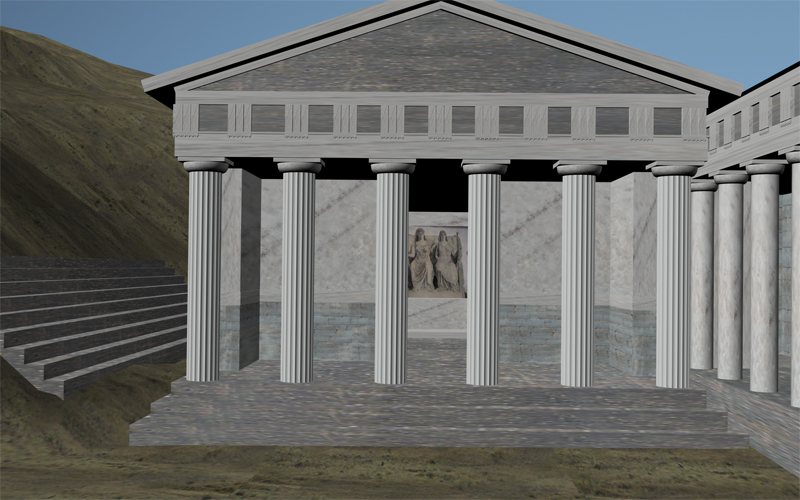
Perspective reconstruction of the Temple of Despoina. The acrolithic statues of Demeter (L) and Despoina (R) are visible at scale in the cella, at left is the theatre-like seating area, and at right is the Stoa

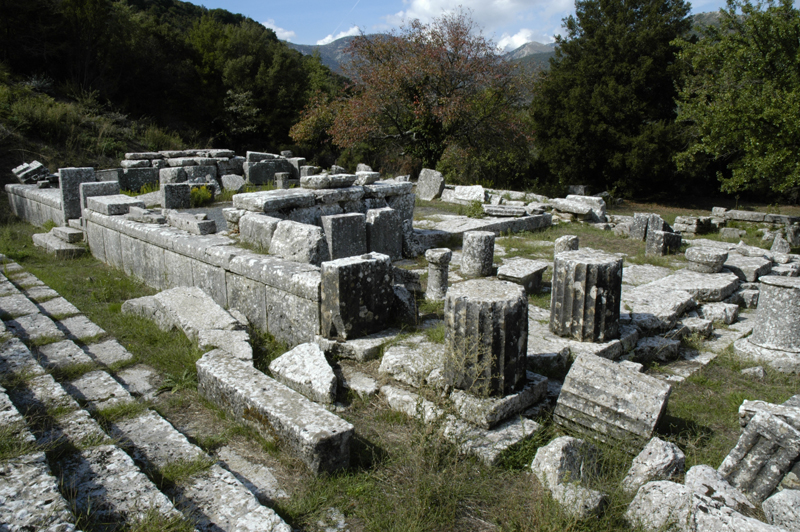
The Temple of Despoina with the theater-like seating area to the left

The Temple of Despoina is prostyle-hexastyle in plan and in the Doric order – i.e., it had six Doric columns across the front façade only. In plan, the stylobate (platform) of the temple measures 11.15 by 21.35 m and is divided between a pronaos (front portico) and a cella. The lower portion of the walls of the temple cella are built of limestone, consisting of a course of orthostates capped by two string courses; the walls are completed to the level of the roof in fired clay brick, which would have been plastered. The six columns of the façade are in marble, as is the entablature. A curious feature of this temple is the doorway in the south wall facing the theater-like area. Although uncommon, side doorways are known from other temples in Arkadia: i.e. Athena Alea at Tegea, and Apollo Epikourios at Bassai.

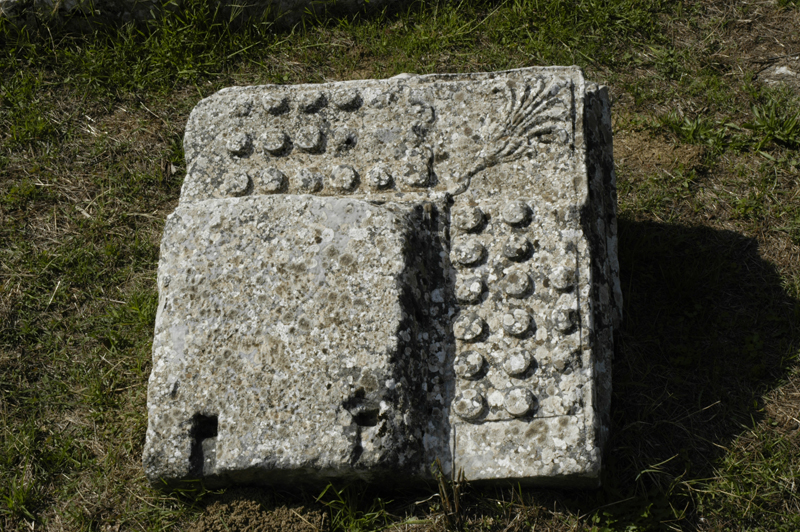
A decorated corner geison block from the entablature of the temple of Despoina

Rather than extending as steps along the four sides of the temple, the stepped crepidoma spans only the front of the temple and has returns on the sides as far as the antae. The architecture also deviates from the standard Doric schema in that its Doric frieze is 1.5 times the height of the architrave. At the rear of the cella is a massive, c. 1 m high stone podium designed to hold the cult statuary group, in front of which is a mosaic decorating the floor. General consensus holds that the first construction of this temple dates to the fourth century BCE. There were several repairs during the Roman period.

To the south of the temple, inset into the slope of the hill, is a theater-like area with ten rows of stone seats ranging from 21 to 29 m in length. These rows of seats are uncurved and parallel with the south wall of the temple.

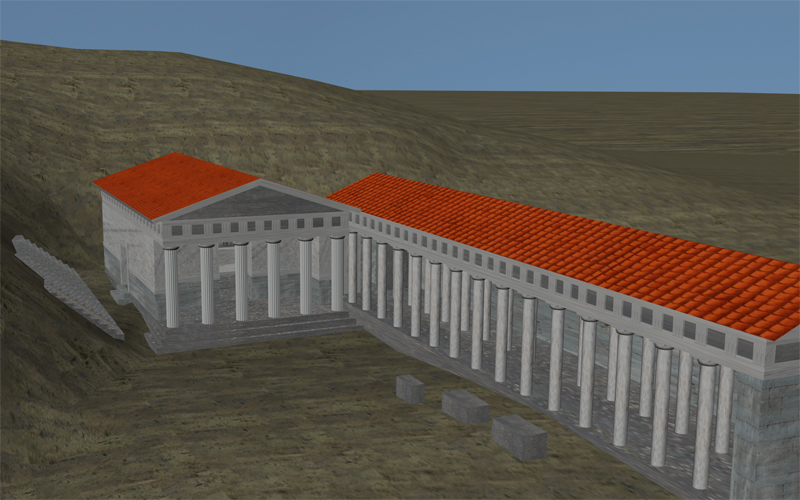
View of the sanctuary looking WNW from the area of the Megaron: (L to R) theater-like area, temple of Despoina, stoa, altars

To the northeast of the temple, there was a Stoa also in the Doric order with a single story and an internal colonnade, measuring 14 by 64 m. Foundations for a room of uncertain function measuring 5.5 by 6 m are connected to the west end of the stoa. Pausanias reported that the stoa contained a panel painted with matters pertaining to the mysteries and four bas-relief sculptures in white marble depicting:

1. Zeus and the Fates
2. Hercules wrestling Apollo for the Delphic tripod
3. nymphs and pans
4. The historian Polybios with an inscription praising his wisdom

Unfortunately, none of these reliefs has been recovered in the excavations. Similar use of a stoa to display artwork is known for the Stoa Poikile (Painted Stoa) of ancient Athens, where scenes were painted directly onto the rear wall of the structure. Stoas, as well as treasuries, were frequently used at sanctuaries to store votive gifts to the deities: e.g. the stoa and treasury of the Athenians at Delphi and the multiple treasuries at Olympia.

Three small, stone altars were found in the area c. 15 m to the east of the temple dedicated to Despoina, Demeter, and Gaia, the Great Mother, respectively. Many votive gifts and offerings also were found in the excavation of the sanctuary.

=== Megaron and beyond ===
The structure termed the Megaron (Great Hall), after Pausanias, is poorly preserved but secure in its essential plan measuring 9.5 x 12 m. In the view of William Dinsmoor this structure can be reconstructed as a monumental altar with stairways flanking both sides and having a small stoa at its top – comparable to the Great Altar of Zeus at Pergamon. Of great interest are the more than one hundred and forty terra cotta figurines having the heads of sheep or cows that were found in the area of the Megaron. The great majority of these are women and closely resemble the decorative figures carved into the veil of the colossal head of Despoina.

Beyond the Megaron, Pausanias also noted the presence of a grove sacred to Despoina surrounded by stones with altars of Poseidon Hippios and other deities beyond that, with one altar stating that it was sacred to all the deities. From there it was possible to access a shrine of Pan via a flight of stairs. Associated with this shrine were an altar of Ares, two statues of Aphrodite (one marble one wooden – a xoanon – and older), wooden images (xoana) of Apollo and Athena, and a sanctuary of Athena. These features have not been securely located.

=== Archaeological remains outside of the sanctuary ===
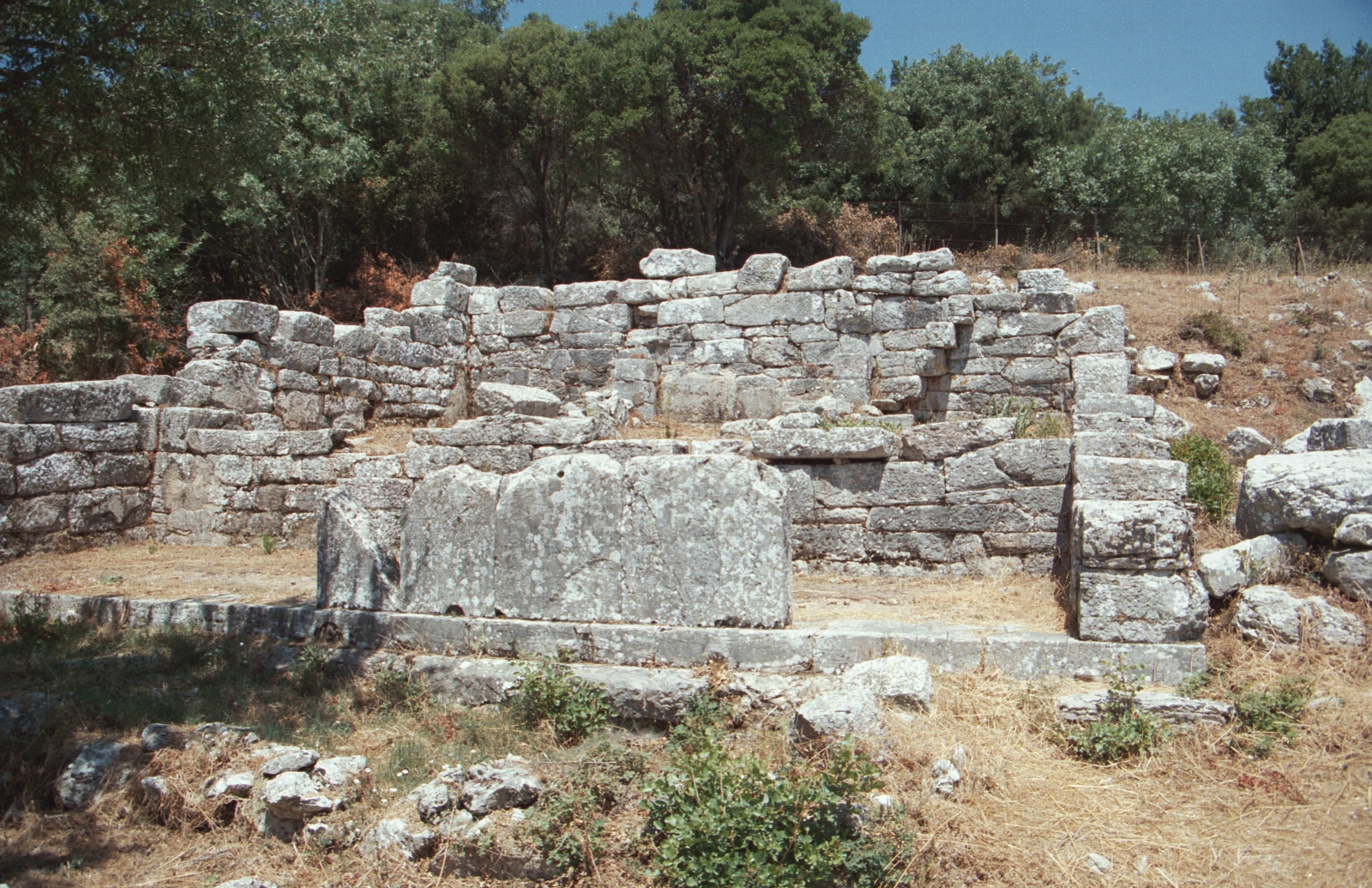
Fountain/Nymphaeum

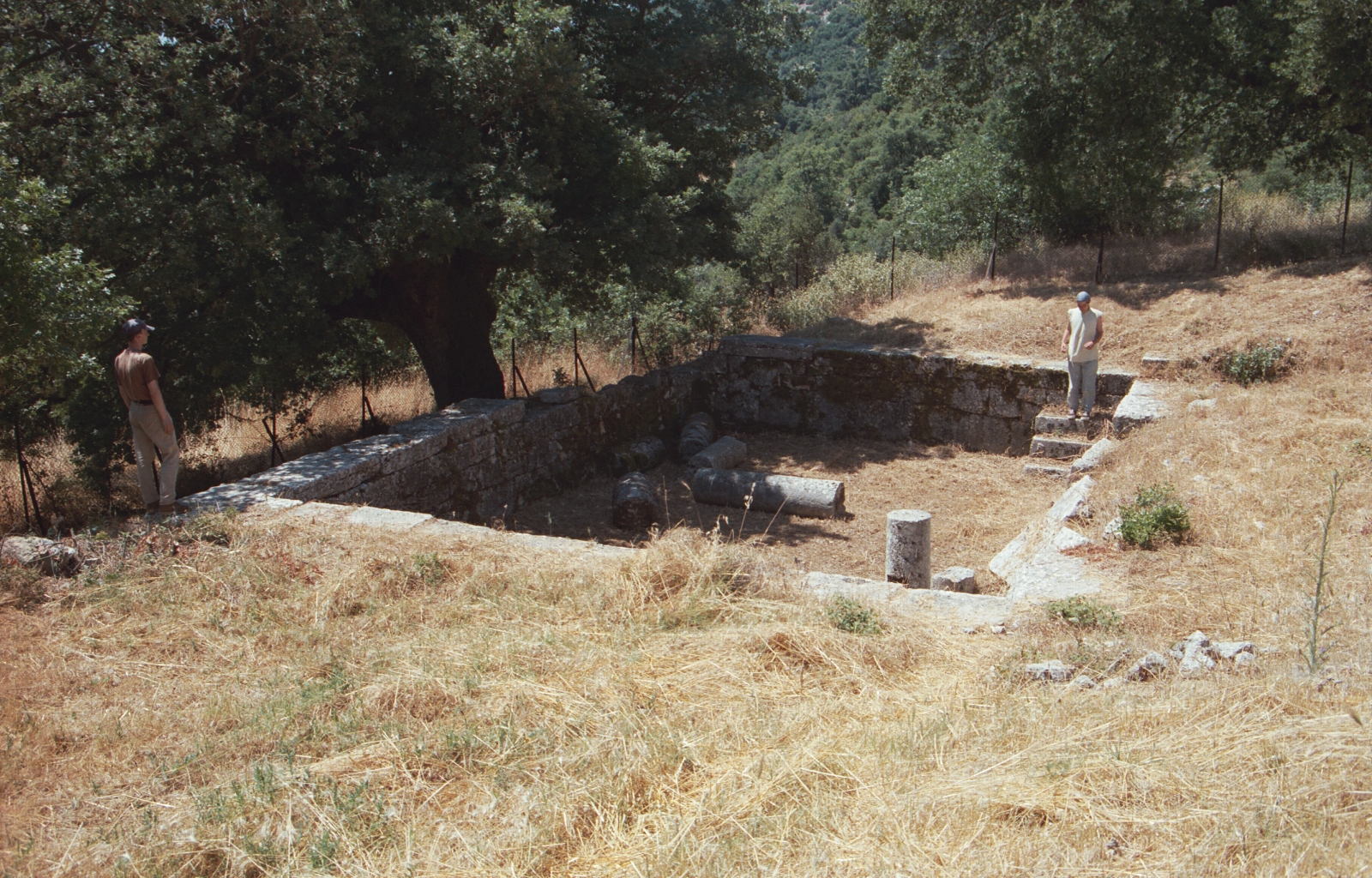
Roman Piscina or cistern

Although the sanctuary of Despoina has been excavated to a large extent, the urban area of Lycosura and its periphery have received much less attention. Outside of the sanctuary and 60 m southwest of the temple on the opposite side of the ridge running southeast to northwest up to the hill of the acropolis, a number of structures using water have been uncovered of Hellenistic and Roman date, perhaps a nymphaeum (fountain-house) and a complex of Roman thermae (baths). Some remains of the city wall have also been traced.

=== Cult sculptural group ===
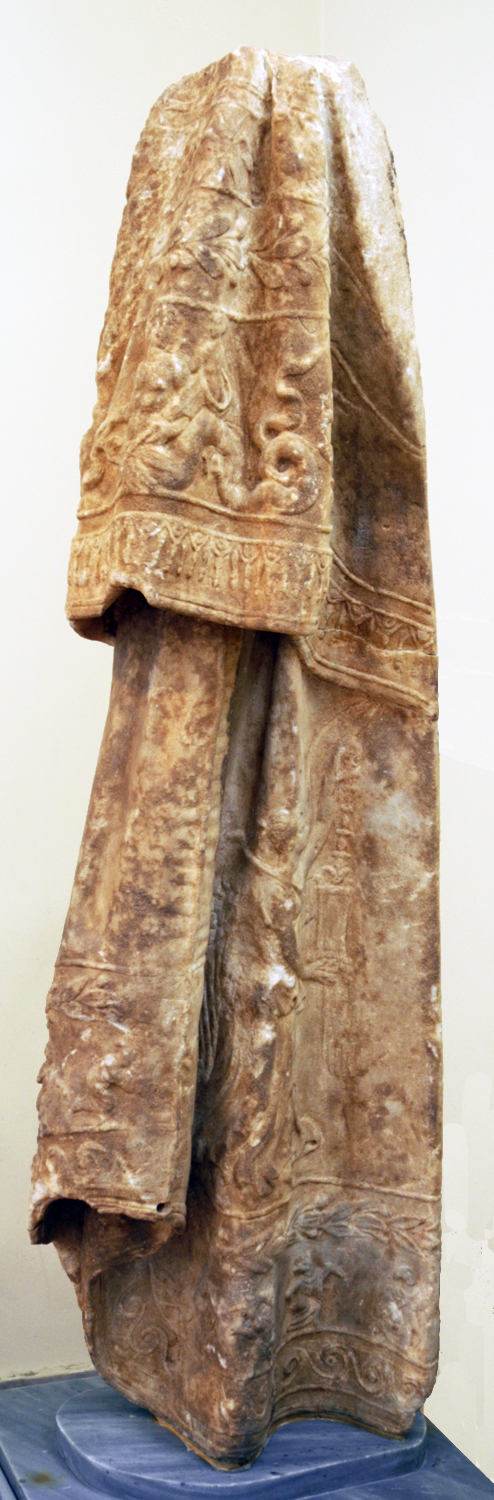
The Veil of Despoina

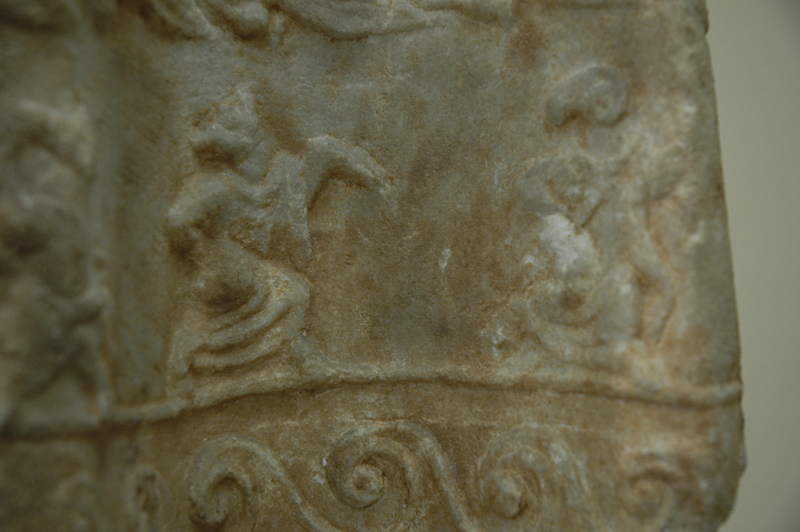
Detail of the Veil of Despoina

Although in many fragments and not completely preserved, the colossal cult group attributed to Damophon by Pausanias has been extensively studied and described. The relatively small cella of the temple of Despoina was dominated by a cultic group of statues comprising four significantly greater than life-size acrolithic-technique figures as well as a highly ornate throne for the central figures of Despoina and Demeter – all in Pentelic marble. This arrangement was somewhat unusual in that the typical situation was for there to be a single cult statue at the rear of the cella that was the primary object of veneration. The central figures of Despoina and Demeter were on a colossal scale, significantly greater than that of Artemis and the Titan Anytus. The bust of Despoina is not preserved. Holes are preserved on the bust of Artemis for the attachment of earrings and other metal ornaments, and for a diadem (or rays) on the bust of Demeter. The eyes of Artemis and Anytus were inset, rather than being carved from the marble as they were in the bust of Demeter. The great goddess, Gaia, could be represented as a throne and the throne of Despoina and Demeter was decorated with tritonesses – an appropriate theme given the identification of Poseidon as the father of Despoina. This nautical reference is underscored by the presence of marine themes on the veil of Despoina as well. One of these tritonesses was replaced in the Roman period, indicating damage to the group, perhaps due to an earthquake.

While the entire group is of significant stylistic interest, the veil of Despoina is particularly so, due to the complexity of its decorative program. In addition to the lines of dancing, animal-headed women mentioned above, there are several other registers of sculpted ornamentation on the two levels of the veil. The upper level of the veil of Despoina has the following modes of decoration (from top to bottom):

- A series of triangular rays
- A band of eagles and winged thunderbolts
- A band of olive sprays
- A frieze of Nereids riding sea horses and Tritons, with dolphins intermixed
- A tasseled fringe

The lower (and larger) layer has (from top to bottom):

- A frieze of Nikai carrying censers, while bearing olive sprays in front of themselves
- A band of olive sprays
- A frieze of dancing animal-headed figures
- A running-wave meander pattern

It has been suggested that this veil is representative of the types of tapestry or embroidered woven materials that were created by contemporary artists in that community. The high level of detail is cited as a hallmark of Damophon's technique. The frieze of marine deities and the running-wave meander pick of the reference to Poseidon in the throne. The band of eagles and winged thunderbolts may be a reference to Zeus.

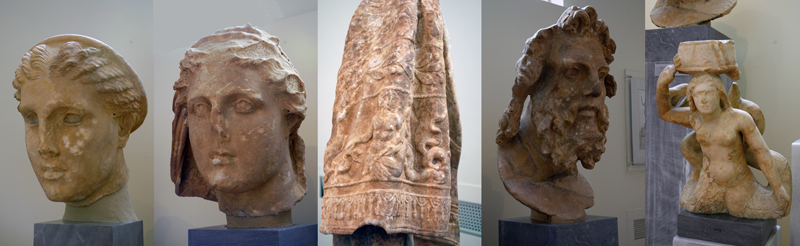
Elements of the Cult Sculptural Group in the National Archaeological Museum of Athens From L-R: Artemis, Demeter, Veil of Despoina, Anytus, Tritoness details from the throne

The images of the goddesses themselves and the throne on which they sit, and the footstool under their feet are of one stone. ... The images are about the same size as that of the Mother among the Athenians. These are works of Damophon. Demeter bears a torch in her right hand, and she has placed her other hand on Despoina. On her knees, Despoina has a scepter and what is called the Cista (box), which is held in her right hand. On either side of the throne, Artemis stands beside Demeter clothed in the hide of a deer, and having a quiver on her shoulders, and one hand there is a torch and in the other two snakes. A dog lies beside Artemis, the sort that is appropriate for hunting. Beside the image of Despoina stands Anytus, portrayed as a representation of a man in armor. —Pausanias 8.37.3-5

== Significance of the site ==
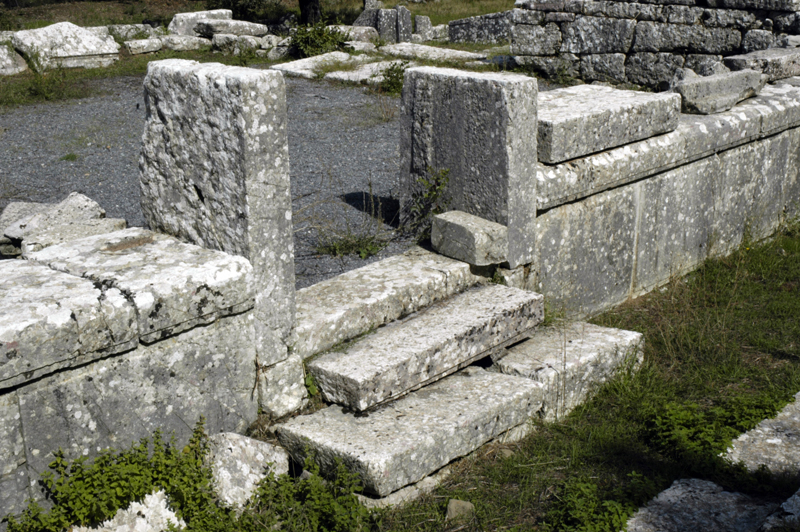
The side doorway to the cella of the temple of Despoina

In addition to the find of the Acrolithic statues commonly attributed to Damophon, this temple is important for the study of ancient Greek religious practice, due to the unusual feature of its side doorway coupled with a theater-like area. Several authors have postulated that the side doorway and theater-like area were created to allow a ritual for the mystery cult of Despoina to take place, perhaps an epiphany of the goddess.

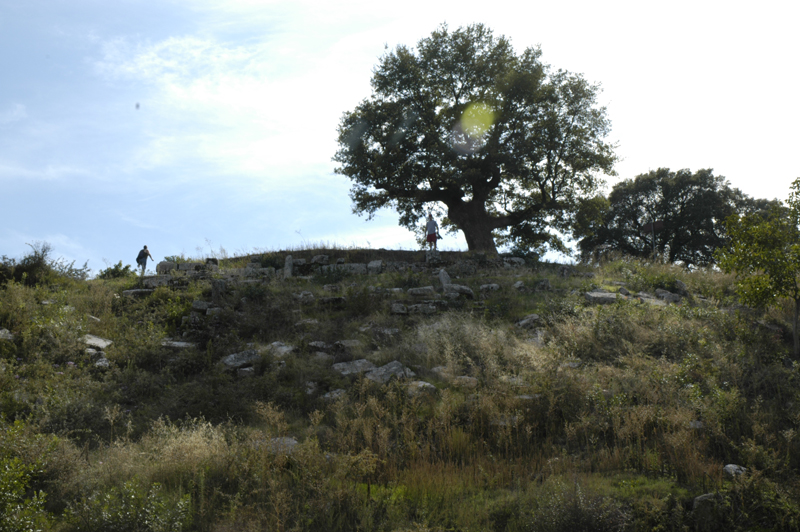
The remains of the Megaron

According to Pausanias, the Megaron (Μέγαρον) was the location for major sacrifices to Despoina by the Arcadians and the location where they enacted the mysteries of the goddess. The mode of sacrifice at the Megaron was unusual in that it involved hacking a limb from the sacrificial animal rather than cutting its throat. The similarity of the figurines found in the vicinity of the Megaron and the dancing figures carved on the veil of Despoina may reveal something concerning the rituals of the cult. The supposition that the site was a locus of cult activity from considerable antiquity is supported by the presence of multiple xoanon-type cult statues, by the unusual mode of sacrifice, and by the special veneration shown to the sanctuary by the Arcadians in 368/7 BCE as discussed above. As with Eleusis and Samothrace, Lycosura is an important site for the study of ancient mystery religions and religion more broadly, although it remained a regional rather than a panhellenic or pan-Mediterranean cult.

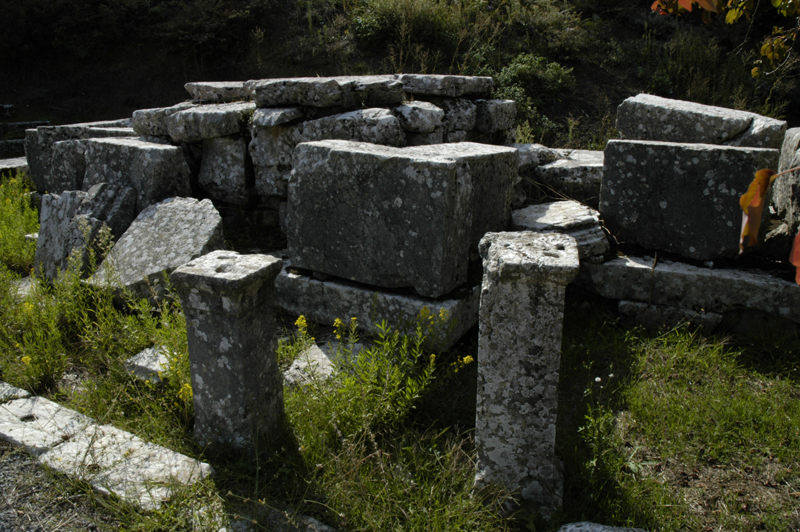
The podium of the cult statuary group in the temple of Despoina

Pausanias relates that the Despoina sculptural group was created by the eminent Hellenistic artist Damophon of Messene. While Damophon has been placed at dates varying from the fourth century BCE to the age of Hadrian in the second century, now it generally is accepted that he was active in the second century BCE, two centuries after the construction of the temple. Pausanias also states that the statues of Despoina and Demeter were worked from a single piece of marble without any use of iron clamps or mortar. As these statues are acrolithic in construction, this statement is manifestly incorrect, rendering his attribution of the group to Damophon equally suspect. At the time of Pausanias' visit, the sculptures would have been three hundred or more years old; no one with certain knowledge of their origins was alive. As much of what has been written concerning the style of Damophon relies on these sculptures, their attribution is of no little importance.

== Gallery ==
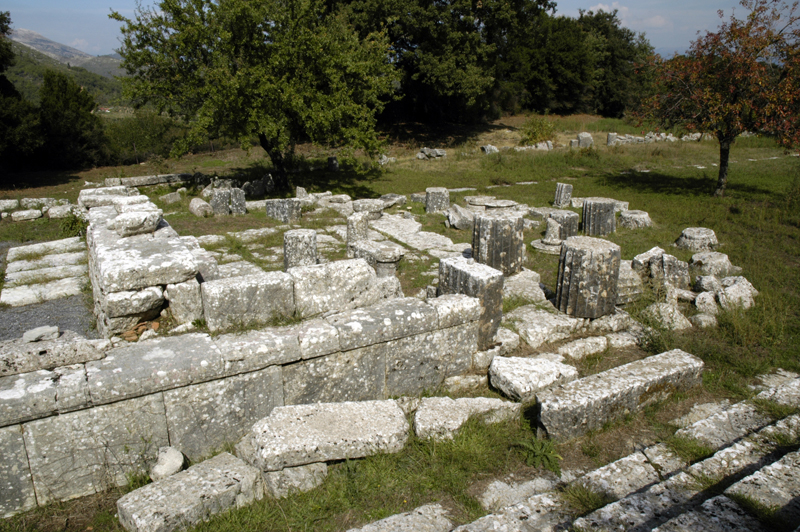
View NE from the theater-like seating area across the pronaos of the temple of Despoina with the Stoa in the distance

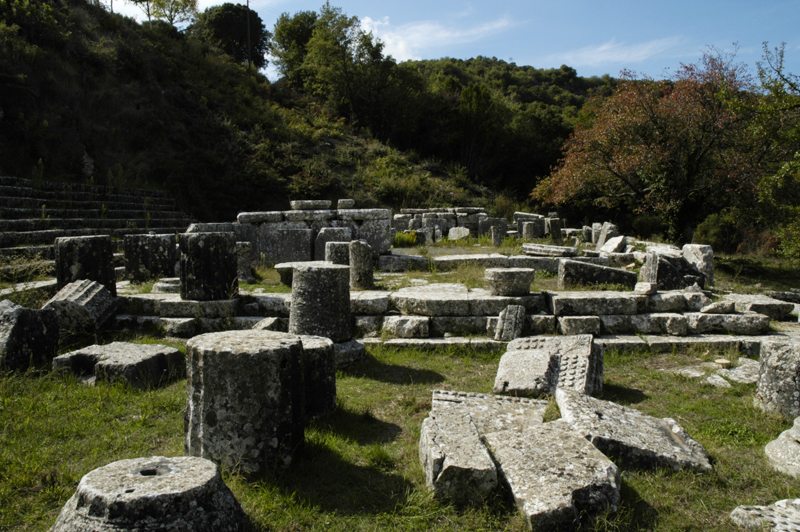
View east into the cella of the temple of Despoina – similar to third render above

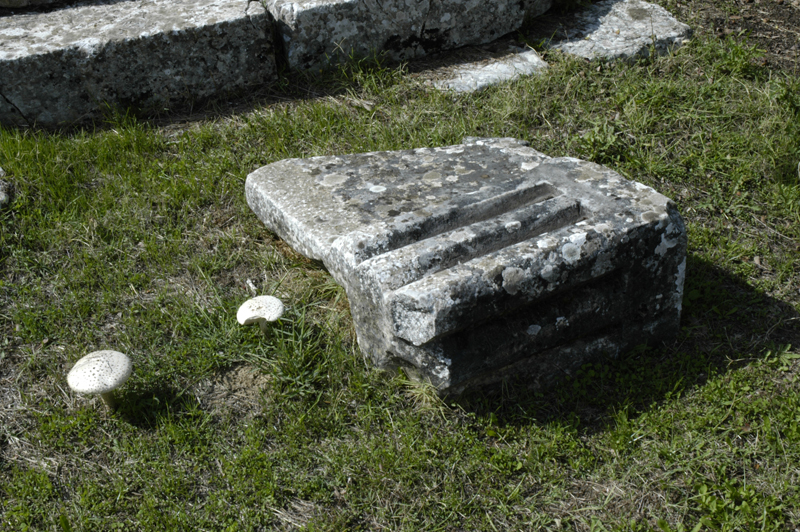
A triglyph and partial metope from the Doric frieze of the entablature

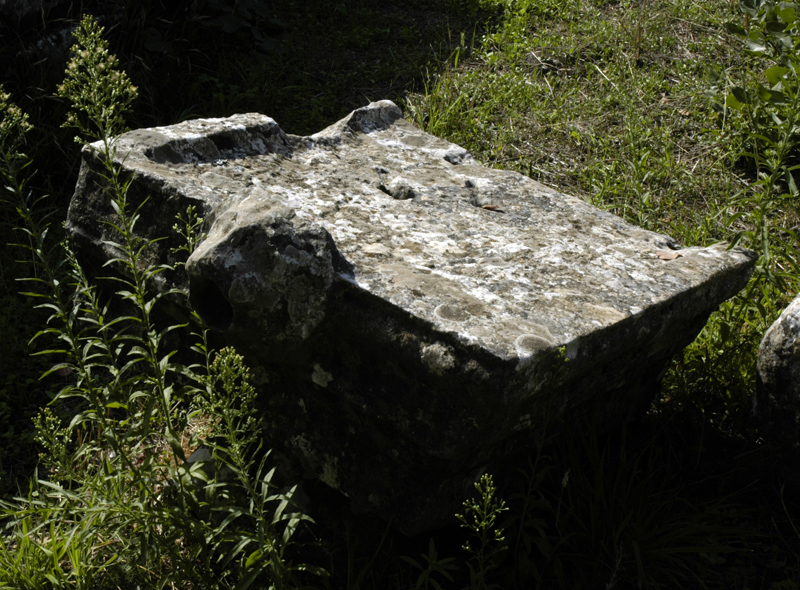
A lion-head water spout from the roof of the temple of Despoina

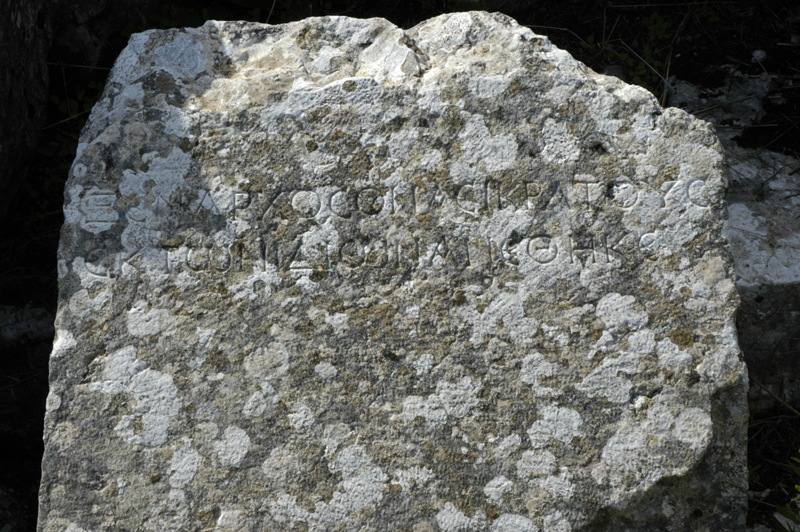
An inscription in the pronaos of the temple of Despoina

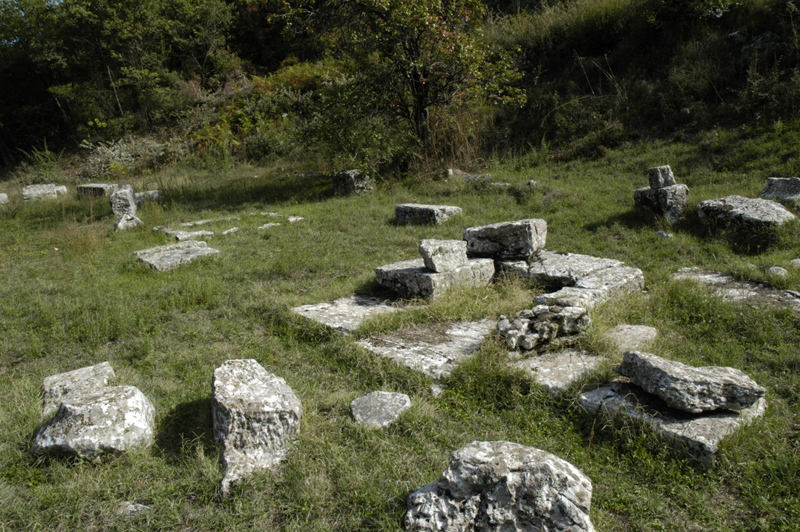
View SE at the remains of the altars south of the Stoa

== See also ==
- National Archaeological Museum of Athens

== Sources ==
- Jost, M. (1985). Sanctuaires et cultes d'Arcadie (in French). Paris.
- Lawrence, A. W. (1996). Greek Architecture (5th ed.). New Haven: Yale University Press.
- Meyer, E. (1926). "Lykosoura". Paulys Real-Encyclopädie der Classischen Altertums-Wissenschaft (in German). Vol. 13. pp. 2417–2432.
