= Phoezon =

Phoezon or Phoizon (Ancient Greek: Φοίζων) was a locality of ancient Arcadia, in the territory of Mantineia. It was situated near the road from Mantineia to Tegea, close to the forest of Pelagos. The tomb of Areithous was located here.
