= Orthostates =

Man-made large stone slabs set in upright position

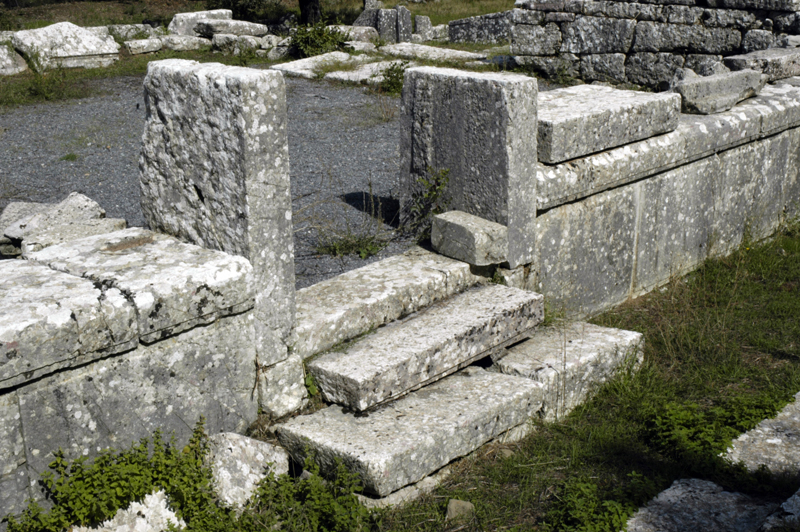
On either side of a doorway, the wall of the Temple of Despoina at Lycosura has a course of orthostates with string courses above them

In the context of classical Greek architecture, orthostates are squared stone blocks much greater in height than depth that are usually built into the lower portion of a wall. They are so called because they seem to "stand upright" rather than to lie on their sides. In other contexts the English term is usually orthostat. It is typical in Greek architecture for pairs of orthostates to form the thickness of a wall, one serving as the inner and the other serving as the outer face of the wall. Above a course of orthostates, it is common to lay a course of stones spanning the width of the wall and joining its two faces (a binder course).

The term has been generalized for use in the description of the architecture of many cultures. In Hittite and Assyrian sculpture, orthostats are often intricately carved. The term may be used more generally of other upright-standing stones, including megalithic menhirs.

== See also ==
- Glossary of architecture
