= Hera Farnese =

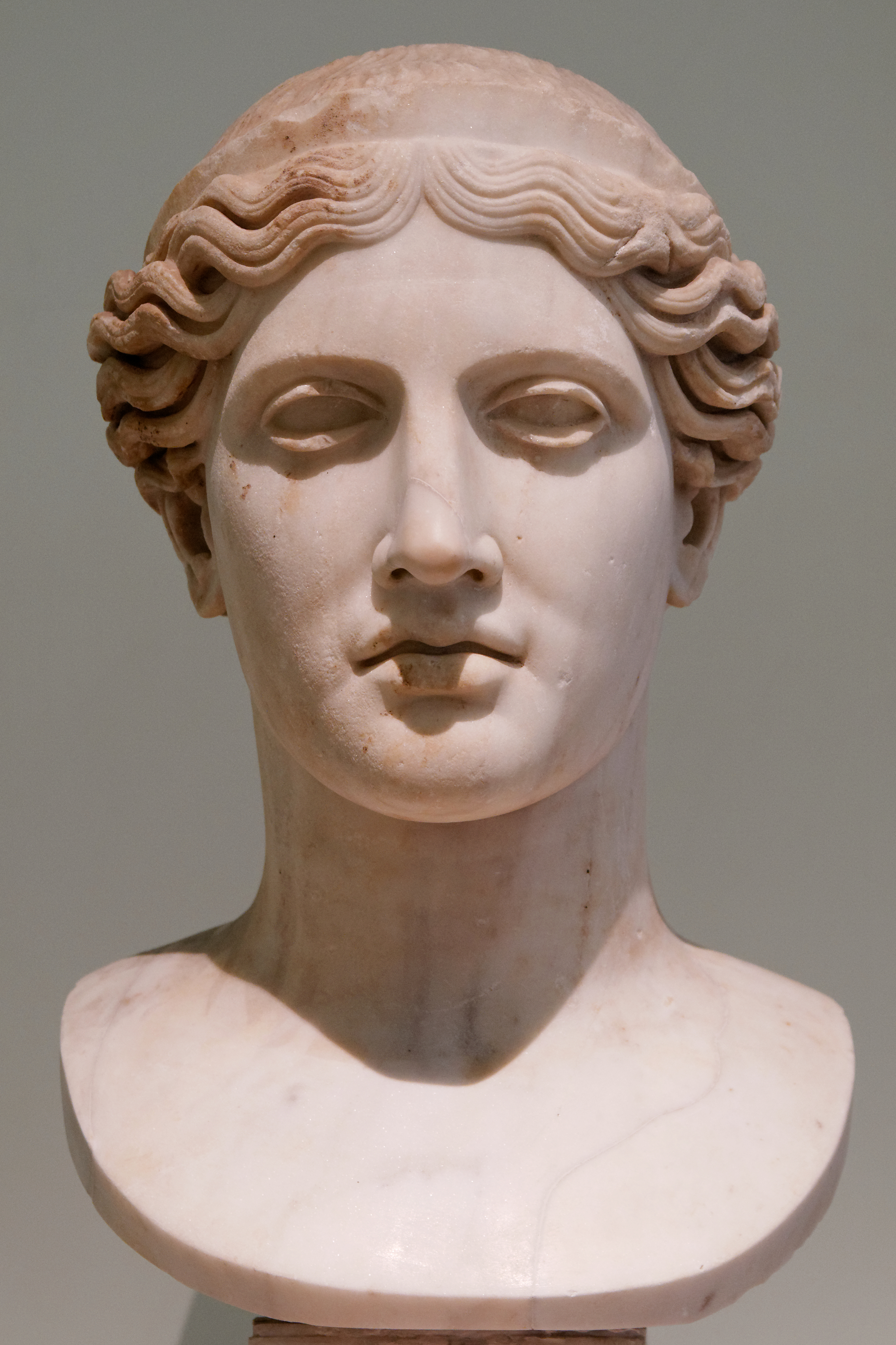
The Hera Farnese

The Hera Farnese is a type of sculpture of Hera.

Its main example is a 63 cm high Roman marble copy of the 1st century AD of a Greek original of the second half of the 5th century BC, now in the Naples National Archaeological Museum. It was part of a colossal acrolithic statue, and shows the goddess with a central parting and wearing a diadem. It was named Hera by the first archaeologists to see it, due to its severe style and unsmiling expression, and they also interpreted these features as making it a Roman copy of an original by Polycleitus.

As part of the Farnese collection it was brought to Naples in 1844 by German archaeologist Heinrich Brunn.

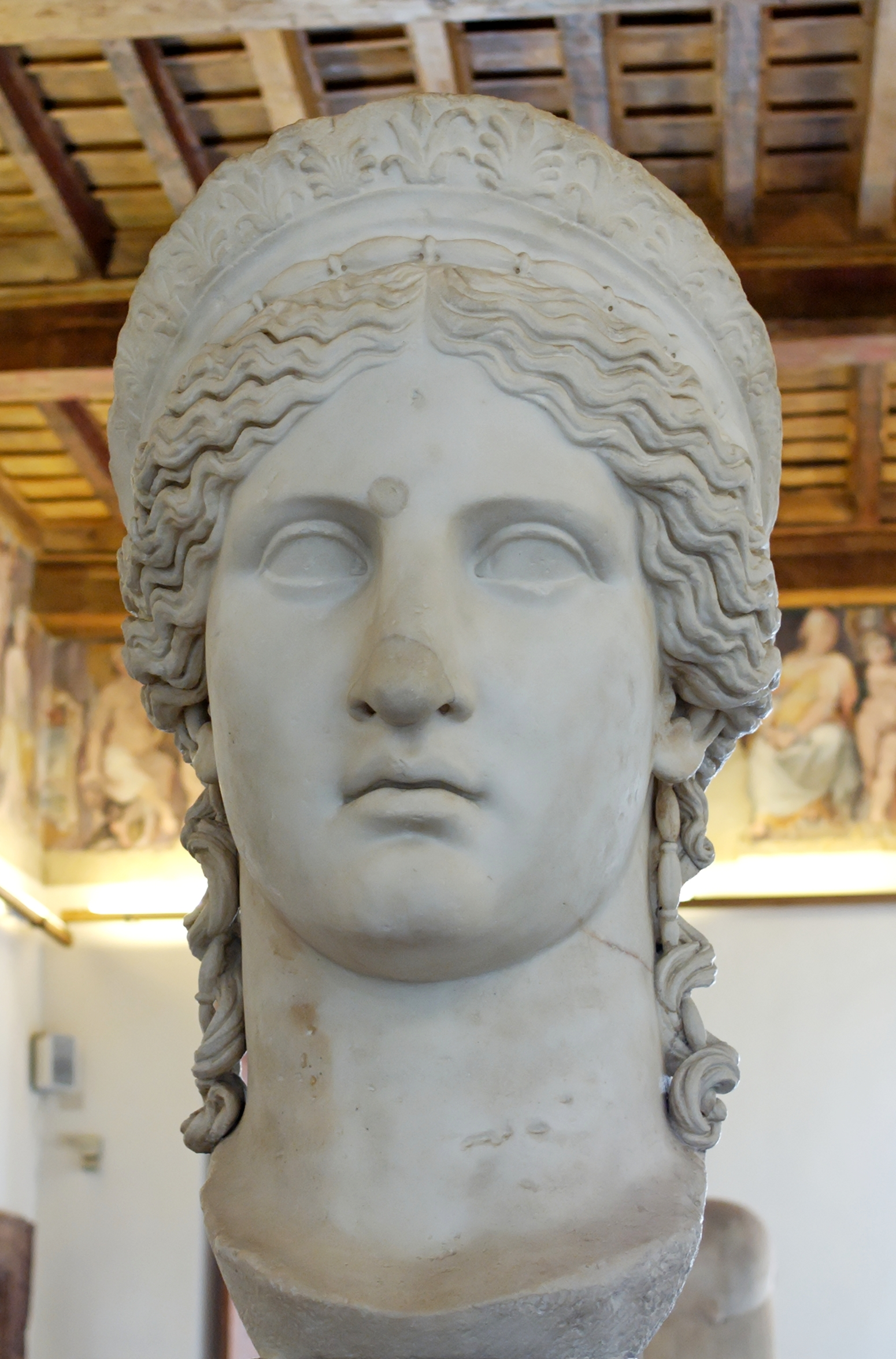
Hera Ludovisi

See also giant statue Hera Ludovisi (portrait of Antonia Minor) in Palazzo Altemps, Rome.

== Notes ==
- Skulpturhalle Basel
