= Leucasium =

Leucasium or Leukasion (Ancient Greek: Λευκάσιον) was a town of ancient Arcadia on the Ladon. Its site is unlocated.
