= Mesoboa =

Mesoboa (Ancient Greek: Μεσόβοα) was a town of ancient Arcadia on the Ladon. Its site is unlocated.
