= Arcadia (region) =

Historical region in Greece

Arcadia Ἀρκαδία
- Historical region
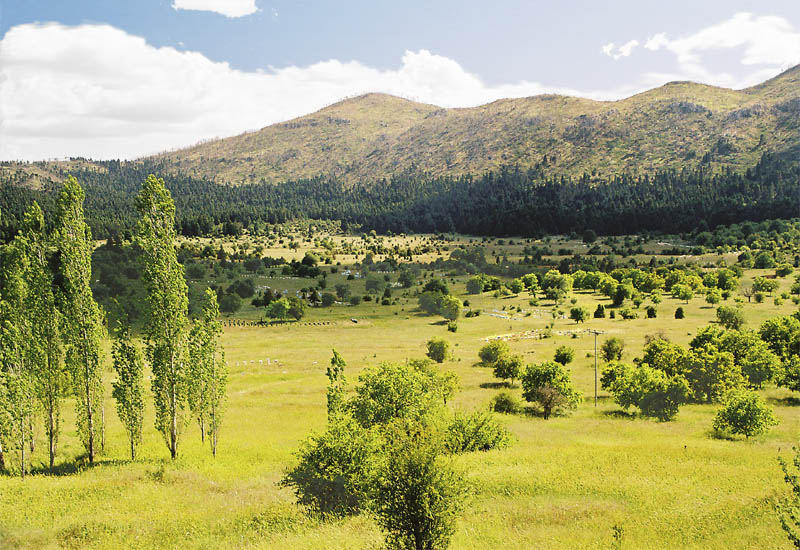
- Landscape of Arcadia

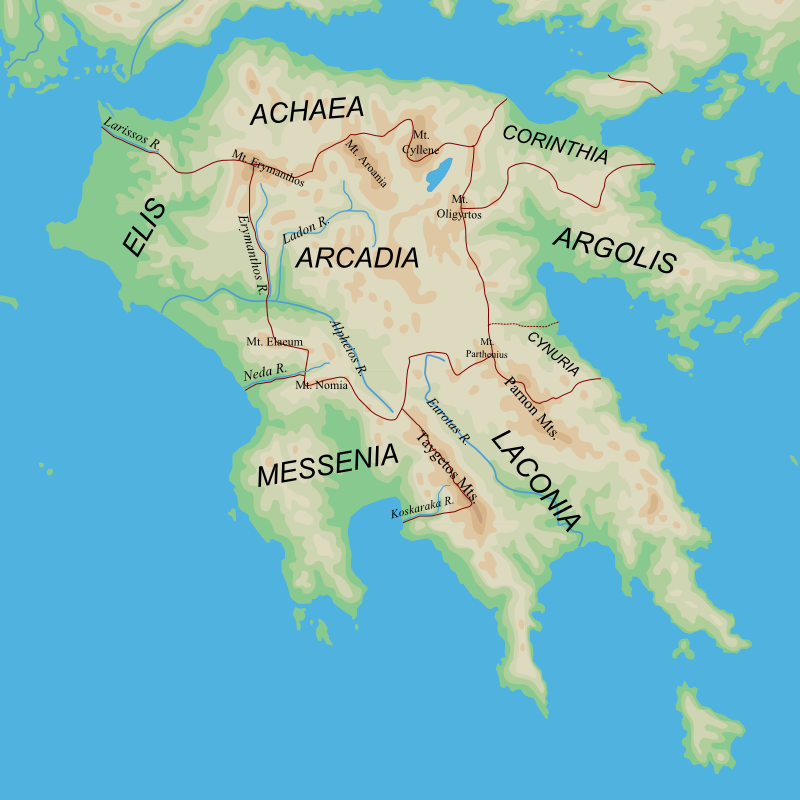
- Ancient Arcadia in the center of the Peloponnese
- Country: Greece
- Region: Peloponnese
- Major cities: Mantineia, Tegea, Orchomenus
- Dialects: Arcado-Cypriot
- Key periods: 4th century BC

Arcadia (/ɑːrˈkeɪdiə/; Greek: Ἀρκαδία, romanized: Arkadía) is a region in the central Peloponnese, Greece. It takes its name from the mythological character Arcas, and in Greek mythology it was the home of the gods Hermes and Pan. In European Renaissance arts, Arcadia was celebrated as an unspoiled, harmonious wilderness; as such, it was referenced in popular culture.

The modern regional unit of the same name more or less overlaps with the historical region, but is slightly larger.

== History ==
Ancient regions of the Peloponnese with cities

Arcadia was gradually linked in a loose confederation that included all the Arcadian towns and was named League of the Arcadians. In the 7th century BC, it successfully faced the threat of Sparta and the Arcadians managed to maintain their independence. They participated in the Persian Wars alongside other Greeks by sending forces to Thermopylae and Plataea. During the Peloponnesian War, Arcadia allied with Sparta and Corinth. In the following years, during the period of the hegemony of Thebes, the Theban general Epaminondas reinforced the Arcadian federation in order to rival neighboring Sparta. Then he founded Megalopolis, which became its new capital. Over the next centuries Arcadia weakened. It initially was subjugated by the Macedonians and later the Arcadians joined the Achaean League.

== Geography ==
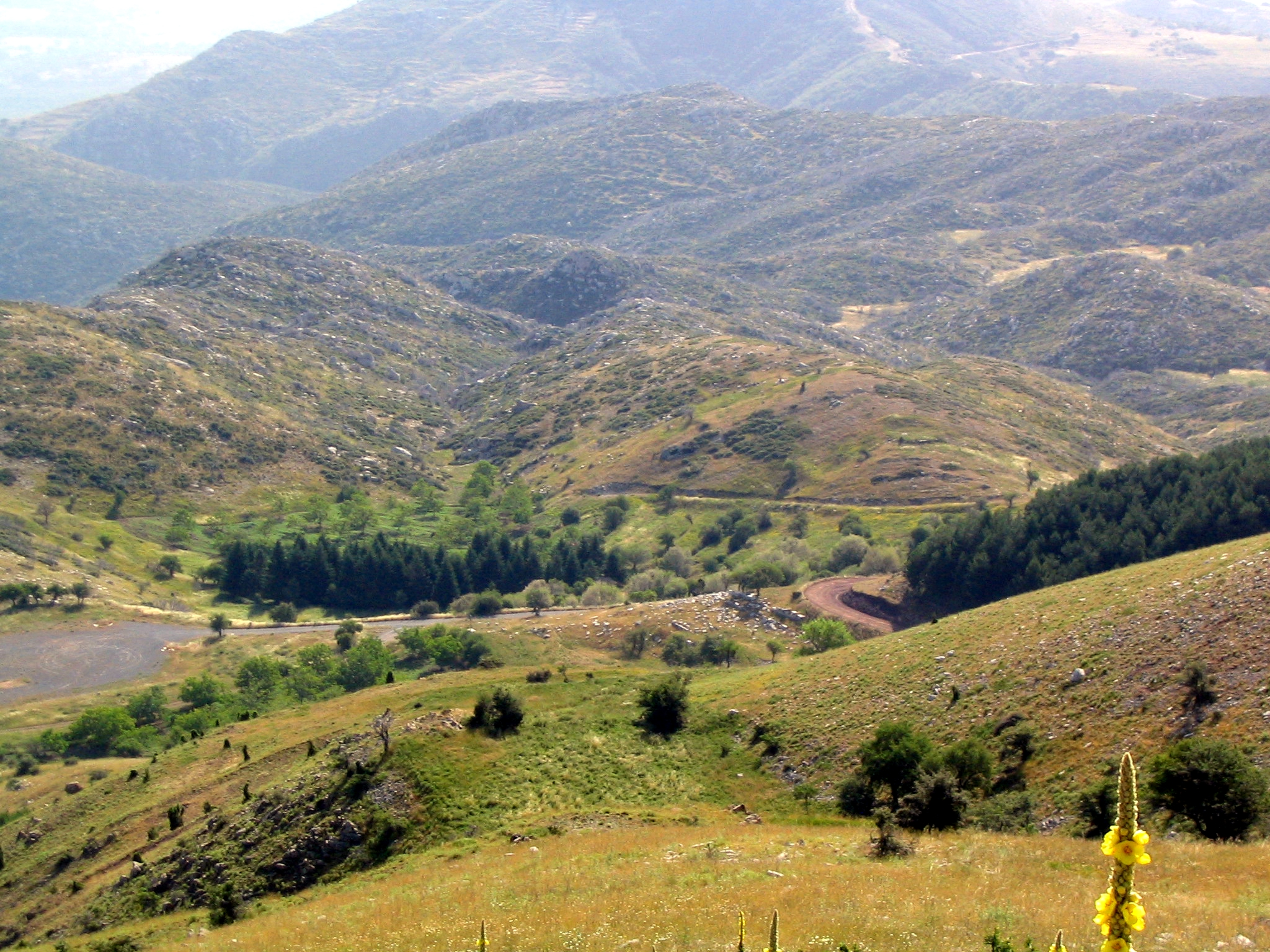
Mount Lykaion

Geographically, ancient Arcadia occupied the highlands at the centre of the Peloponnese. To the north, it bordered Achaea along the ridge of high ground running from Mount Erymanthos to Mount Cyllene; most of Mount Aroania lay within Arcadia. To the east, it had borders with Argolis and Corinthia along the ridge of high ground running from Mount Cyllene round to Mount Oligyrtus and then south Mount Parthenius. To the south, the borders with Laconia and Messenia ran through the foothills of the Parnon and Taygetos mountain ranges, such that Arcadia contained all the headwaters of the Alpheios river, but none of the Eurotas river. To the south-west, the border with Messania ran along the tops of Mount Nomia, and Mount Elaeum, and from there the border with Elis ran along the valleys of the Erymanthos and Diagon rivers. Most of the region of Arcadia was mountainous, apart from the plains around Tegea and Megalopolis, and the valleys of the Alpheios and Ladon rivers.

== Arcadians ==
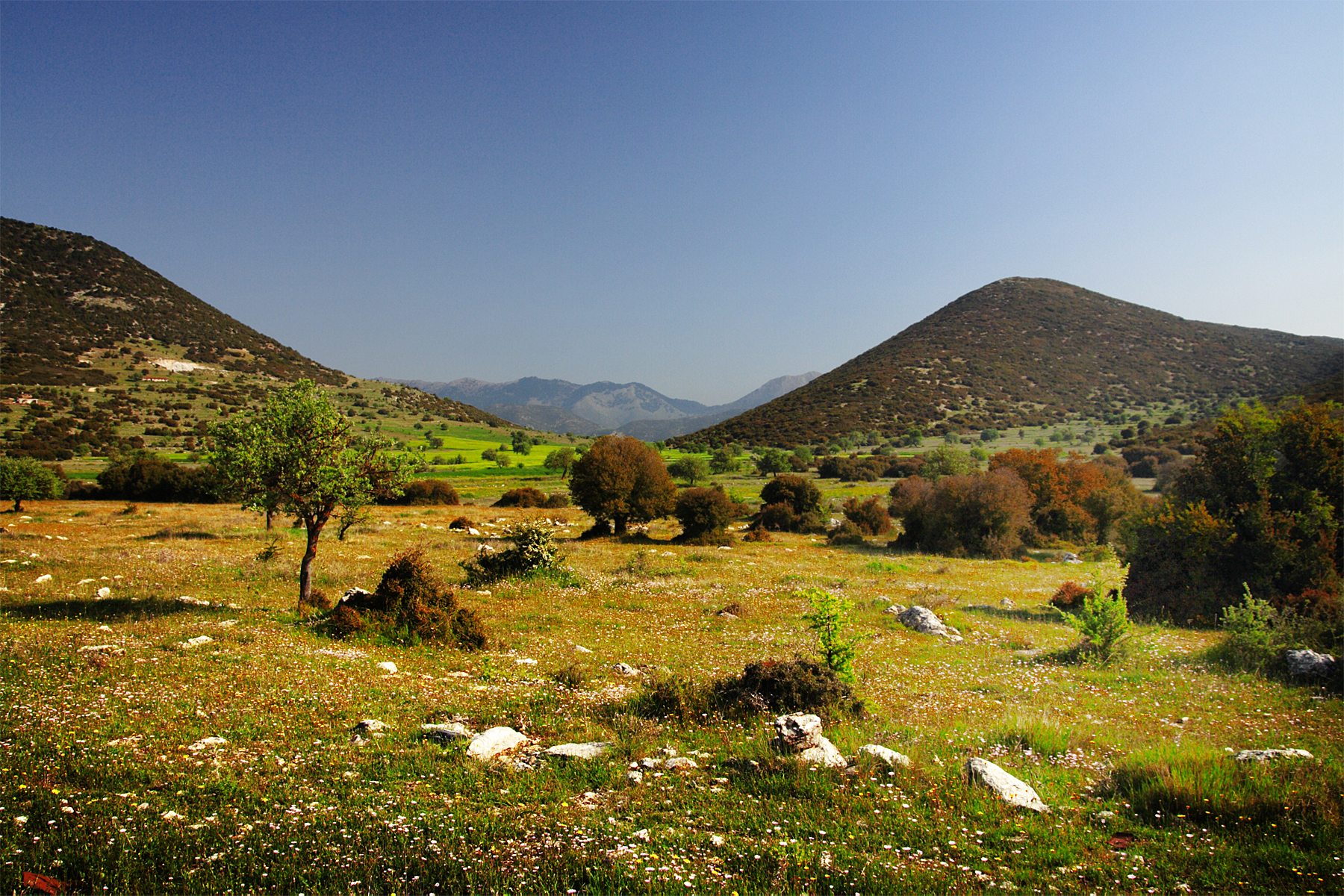
Karst Landscape near the community Vlacherna (Arcadia)

The Arcadians were an ancient Greek tribe which was situated in the mountainous Peloponnese. It was considered one of the oldest Greek tribes in Greece, part of or a relative tribe of the aboriginal inhabitants of Greece (called Pelasgians by ancient Greek authors), as described by Herodotus and in ancient myths such as those of Arcas and Lycaon.

Arcadia is also one of the regions described in the "Catalogue of Ships" in the Iliad; its troops were led by Agapenor. Agamemnon himself gave Agapenor the ships for the Trojan War because Arcadia did not have its own.

== Towns ==
The Arcadians founded numerous towns. Of these the strongest were the cities which controlled the few fertile valleys; Mantinea, Tegea and Orchomenos. The remaining towns were more mountainous or had smaller plains. Some of these were Nostia, Asea, Ypsounta, Teuthis, Heraea, Thyraion, Nestani, Alea, Lycosura, Trikolonon, Tropea, Caphyae, Pallantion, Petrosaca, Feneos, Phoezon, Leucasium, Mesoboa, Stymphalus, etc. From 370 BC the capital of Arcadia became Megalopolis.

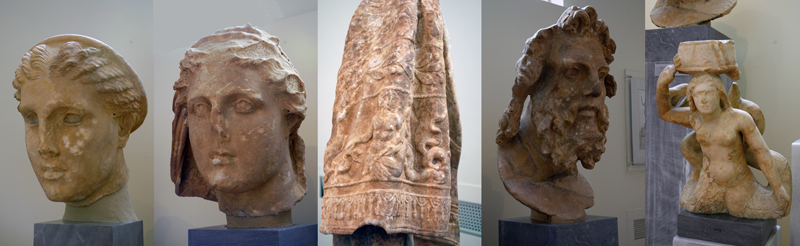
Statues from the Lycosura sanctuary: Artemis, Demeter, veil of Despoina, Antyus, Tritoness.

== Religion ==
Arcadia was the location of the cult of Despoina, also known as the Arcadian mysteries. Despoina means "the mistress", but was only a title given to the goddess, and was not her real name, which was told only to those initiated in the mysteries. Despoina, along with Demeter, was the primary deity worshipped in Arcadia, and was particularly worshipped at a sanctuary at Lycosura.

The Arcadians had their own unique myths, which were mainly centered around Despoina and Demeter. Another important god in Arcadia was Anytos, who was said to be a Titan who raised Despoina.

== Notable Arcadians ==
- Aristocrates II (c. 680–640 BC), king of the Arcadians
- Polybius (c. 200–118 BC), Greek historian of the Hellenistic Period (Megalopolis)
- Philopoemen (253–183 BC), Greek general and statesman, Achaean strategos, known as "the last of the Greeks"

=== Olympic victors ===
- Androsthenes of Maenalus, won gold in 420 and 416 BC
- Euthymenes of Maenalus, won gold in 400 and 392 BC

=== Mythology ===
- Atalanta, a Greek mythic woman said to have been the daughter of the King of Arcadia
- Evander, son of Hermes and an Arcadian nymph called Themis. He was the founder of Pallantium. Pallantium became one of the cities that was merged later into the ancient Rome.
- Hermes, god of gymnasium, public speaking, thievery
- Pan, god of the wild, shepherds and flocks, nature of mountain wilds, hunting and rustic music, and companion of the nymphs
- Themis, a local nymph, lover of Hermes and mother of Evander. Romans called her Carmenta.
- Arcas, a mythological king of Arcadia, from which the region takes its name
- Lycaon, a king of Arcadia turned into a wolf. He had fifty sons, many of whom gave their names to various towns in the region.
- Callisto, daughter of Lycaon and follower of the goddess Artemis. She was turned into a bear and shot, becoming the constellation Ursa Major.

== See also ==
- Elysium
