= Anytos =

One of the Titans of Greek mythology

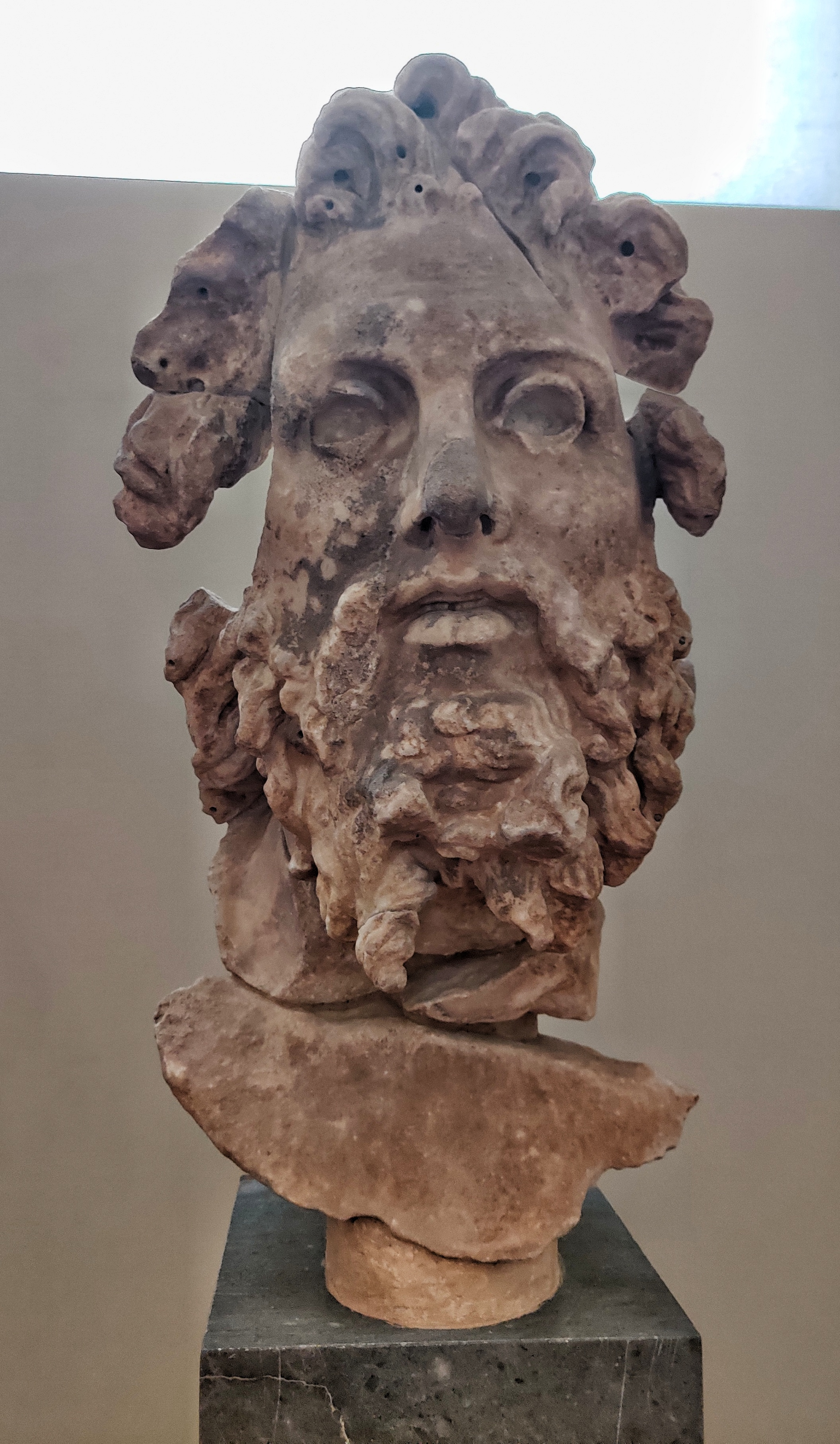
Head of titan Anytus, from the temple of Despoina at Lykosoura in Arkadia. National Archaeological Museum, Athens

Anytos or Anytus (Ancient Greek: Ἄνυτος, romanized: Ánytos) was one of the Titans of Greek mythology. He was supposed to have raised Despoina, and in Arcadia during Pausanias' time the two were represented by statues in a temple near Acacesium.

== The Lycosoura Anytos (NAMA 1736) ==
The cult of Anytos is prominent in the city of Lycosura, home to the Temple of Despoina, a temple dedicated to the Chthonic pantheon consisting of Artemis, Demeter, and Despoina.

Currently housed in the National Archaeological Museum of Athens, the bust of Anytos was discovered in excavations during the Summer of 1889.

Measuring 74 cm, the bust alongside the bust of Artemis and Demeter, was carved by the artist Damophon in 180 BC, is also considered an acrolith, a composite of many different materials with the head and limbs made of local marble, while the body portion made of wood.

Based upon the descriptions of the historian Pausanias in his text Description of Greece, written in the 2nd century, the statue of Artemis would stand alongside the statue of Demeter, while Anytos would stand right beside that of Despoina, dressed in warriors garb. The statue is the most fragmented out of those who exist on the pantheon but fragments of the god's garb were found in addition to fragments of his limbs. The remnants has since then been part of the display at the National Archaeological Museum, under the designation NAMA 1736.

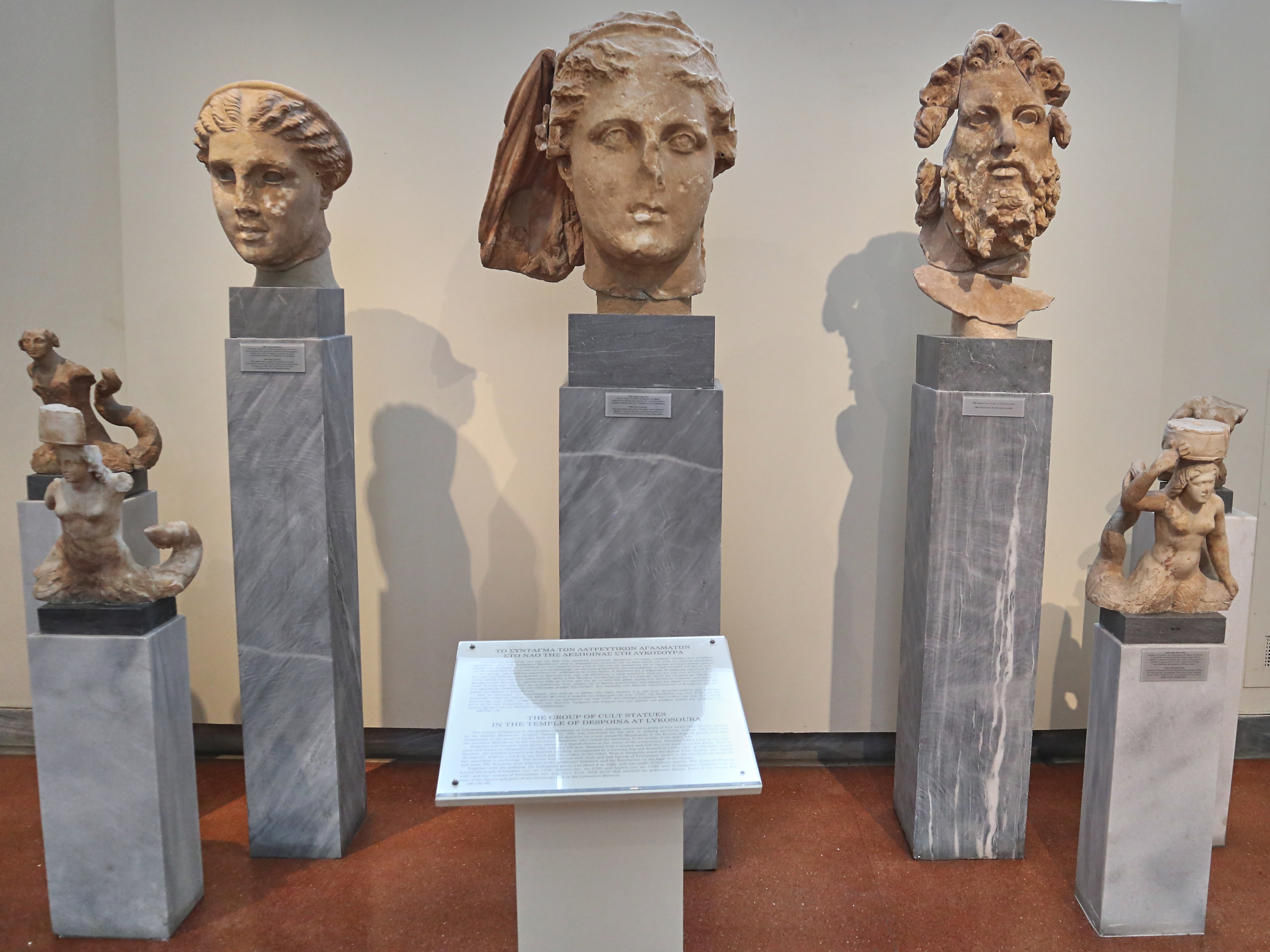
The pantheon as displayed in Athens in 2018.
