= Despoina =

Greek goddess of Arcadian mystery cults

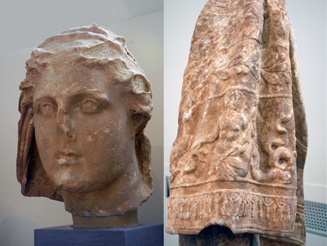
- Sculpture of Demeter, and the veil of Despoina
- Abode: Arcadia
- Symbols: Veil

Genealogy
- Parents: Poseidon and Demeter
- Siblings: Arion (twin), several paternal and maternal half-siblings

Despoina or Despoena (/dɛsˈpiːnə/; Greek: Δέσποινα, romanized: Déspoina) was the epithet of a goddess worshipped by the Eleusinian Mysteries in Ancient Greece as the daughter of Demeter and Poseidon and the sister of Arion. Surviving sources refer to her exclusively under the title Despoina ("the Mistress," cognate of "Despot") alongside her mother Demeter, as her real name could not be revealed to anyone except those initiated into her mysteries and was consequently lost with the extinction of the Eleusinian religion.

== Etymology ==
The first element of the name Des-poina is derived from the PIE root *dem- meaning "house, household", Sanskrit dámaḥ "house"; Avestan demana- "house"; Greek domos "house"; Latin domus "house". Related words despotēs "master, lord"; Latin dominus "master of a household"; Armenian tanu-ter "house-lord". The second element is derived from the hypothetical PIE form *pot-nih_{a}-, "mistress", "lady", "wife", is the feminine counterpart to *pótis, "husband"; cf. Latin hospēs, "host", Sanskrit páti-, "master", "husband", fem. pátnī-, "lady", "wife". The Greek female equivalent for despotēs was despoina "lady, queen, mistress," source of the fem. proper name Despina. (Etymologically the "mistress of the house".)

Related attested forms, written in the Linear B syllabary, are the Mycenaean Greek 𐀡𐀴𐀛𐀊, po-ti-ni-ja, (potnia) and perhaps 𐀡𐀮𐀆𐀃, po-se-da-o, and 𐀡𐀮𐀆𐀺𐀚, po-se-da-wo-ne (Poseidon), which were inherited into classical Greece with identical or related meanings. (Note: A Mycenaean word more directly related to despoina would be the possible theonym 𐀈𐀡𐀲, do-po-ta, provided that the latter is indeed to be read as a form of despotes.) An alternative etymology of the goddess Demeter is derived from the hypothetical PIE *dems-méh₂tēr, meaning "mother of the house". In Modern Greek the title "despoinis" (δεσποινίς) means "Miss", literally "little mistress", and can be used to address young ladies and waitresses, amongst others.

== Cult of Despoina ==
The cult of Despoina was significant in the history of ancient Greek mystery religions in Lycosoura, which belonged to a stratum of an earlier religion in Arcadia. Evidently, the religious beliefs of the first Greek-speaking people who entered the region were mixed with the beliefs of the indigenous population. The figure of a goddess of nature, birth, and death was dominant in both Minoan and Mycenean cults during the Bronze Age. Wanax was her male companion (paredros) in the Mycenean cult, and usually, this title was applied to the god Poseidon as king of the sea.

In the myth of the isolated land of Arcadia, Poseidon appears as a beastly horse which represents the river spirit of the underworld. This conception was usual in northern European folklore and not unusual in Greece. The horse (numina) was related to the liquid element and the underworld. The river god Acheloos is represented as a bull. Poseidon mates with the mare, Demeter, and from the union she bears the horse, Arion, and a daughter. It seems that the Greek deities started as powers of nature, and then they were given other attributes. These powers of nature developed into a belief in nymphs and in deities with human forms and the heads or tails of animals. Some of them, such as Pan and the Silenoi, survived into the classical age. The two great Arcadian goddesses, Demeter and Despoina (later Persephone), were closely related to the springs and the animals, and especially, to the goddess Artemis (Potnia Theron: "The mistress of the animals"), who was the first nymph.

On a marble relief at Lycosura is the veil of Despoina, on which human figures are represented with the heads of different animals, seemingly, in a ritual dance. Some of them hold flutes. These could be a procession of women with animal masks or of hybrid creatures. Similar processions of daemons or human figures with animal masks appear on Mycenean frescoes and gold rings. Most of the temples were built near springs, and in some of them there is evidence of an eternal flame. At Lycosura, a fire burned in front of the temple of Pan, the goat god. The megaron of Eleusis is quite similar to the "megaron" of Despoina at Lycosura.

=== Sanctuary at Lycosura ===
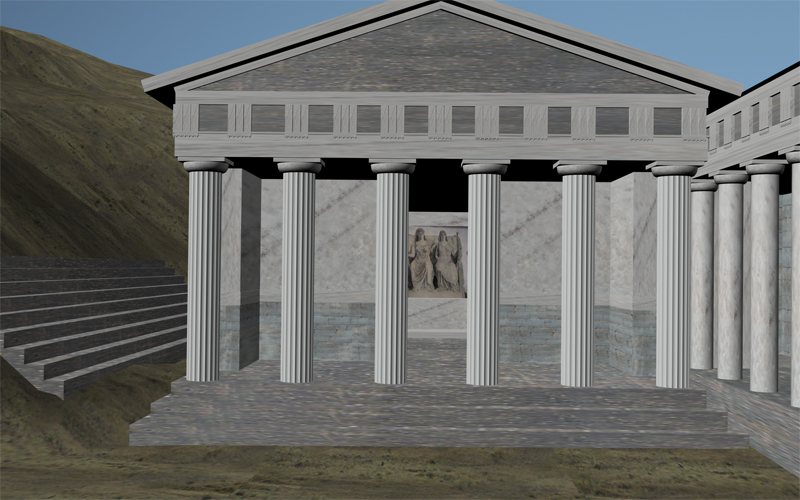
Perspective reconstruction of the temple of Despoina: the acrolithic statues of Demeter (L) and Despoina (R) are visible at the scale in the cella

Despoina was worshipped in a sanctuary at Lycosura, west of the town of Megalopolis. Poseidon was the father of Despoina and he was worshipped as Poseidon Hippios (horse). Although this cult remained regional rather than becoming panhellenic, this is a very important site for the study of ancient mystery religions. In Arcadia Poseidon was closely related to the pair of Arcadian great goddesses identified as Demeter and Kore.

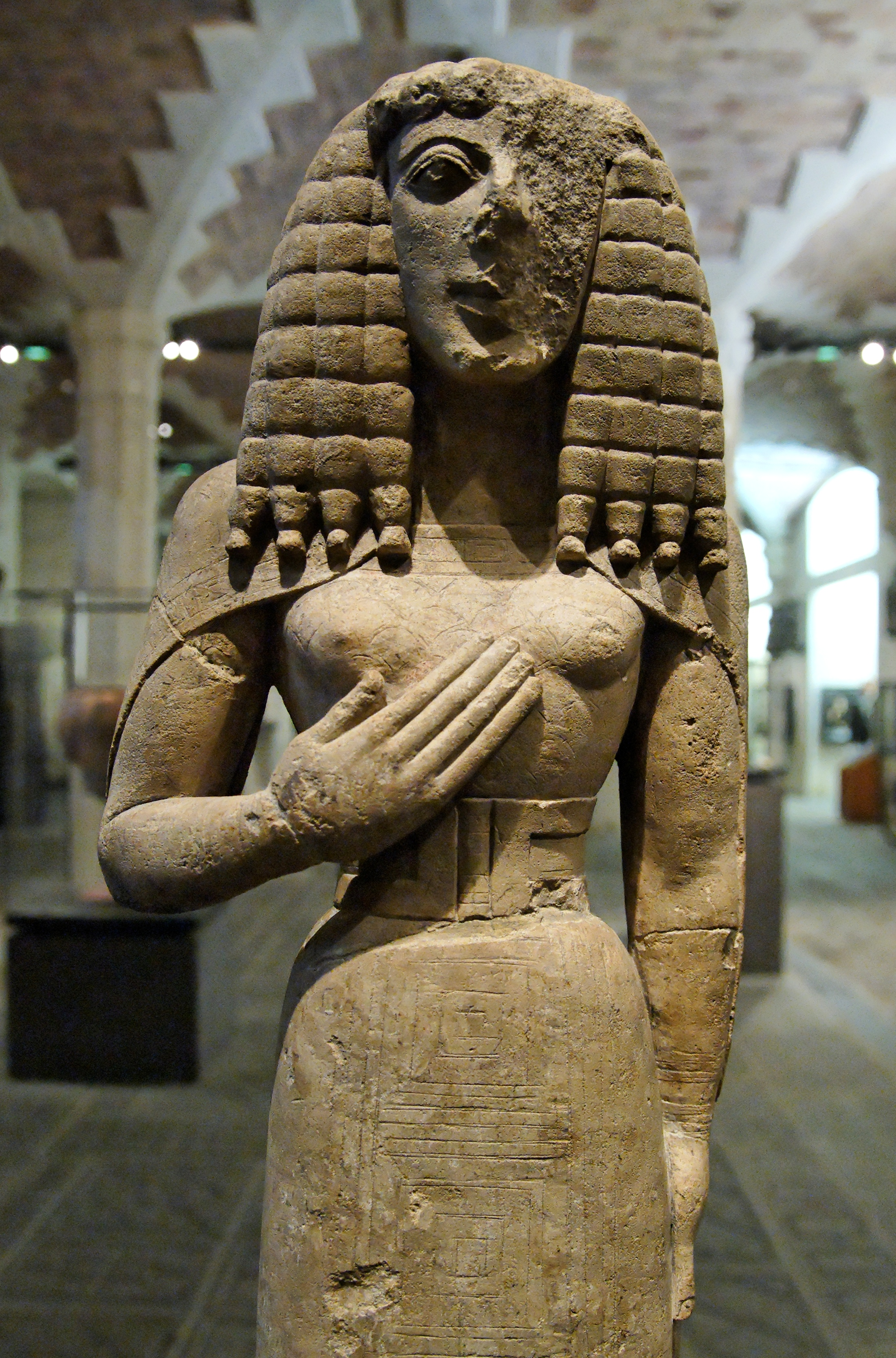
This Archaic image, the Lady of Auxerre, may be the Minoan goddess identified with Kore (c. 630-640 BCE, Louvre)

She was known by the additional epithet of Despoine among the general population, just as they surnamed Demeter's daughter by Zeus as Kore (the maiden).

Women who worshiped at the site had to adhere to a dress code that prohibited participants from wearing black or purple, possibly because those colours were worn by priestesses.

=== Origins ===
In the mysteries Demeter was a second goddess below her daughter, the unnameable "Despoina". It seems that the myths in Arcadia were connected with the first Greek-speaking people who came from the north during the Bronze Age. The two goddesses had close connections with the rivers and the springs. They were related to Poseidon, the god of the rivers and the springs, and especially to Artemis, who was the first nymph. Her epithet, "the mistress", has its analogue in Mycenean Greek inscriptions found at Pylos in southern Greece and at Knossos in Crete. Later, Despoina was conflated with Kore (Persephone), the goddess of the Eleusinian Mysteries, in a life-death-rebirth cycle. Karl Kerenyi asserted that the cult was a continuation of a Minoan goddess, and that her name recalls the Minoan-Mycenaean goddess 𐀅𐁆𐀪𐀵𐀍𐄀𐀡𐀴𐀛𐀊, da-pu_{2}-ri-to-jo,po-ti-ni-ja, i.e. the unnamable "Mistress of the Labyrinth" at Knossos.

=== Epithet ===
"Despoina" was an epithet for several goddesses, especially Aphrodite, Persephone, Demeter, and Hecate. Persephone and Demeter are two of the three goddesses of the Eleusinian Mysteries. They are perhaps the "Two Queens" referred to in various Linear B inscriptions. At Olympia they were called Despoinai (Δέσποιναι).

The epithet, Despoina, is possibly related to the Mycenean title, "potnia" (po-ti-ni-ja), that usually referred to goddesses. Some theories suggest that this could be the translation of a similar title of Pre-Greek origin, just as the title "Our lady" in Christianity is translated in several languages. It is also theorised that the original title may have accompanied a potential Aegean mother goddess.

== Archaeology ==
At the time of a visit to the sanctuary at Lycosura by Pausanias in the second century A.D., the sculptures would have been 300 or more years old. In the second century A.D., a statue of the emperor Hadrian was dedicated in the temple. Coins from Megalopolis, from the Severan period in the early third century, appear to depict a statue from the cult group.

There is a museum at the archaeological site called the Archaeological museum of Lykosoura, housing small finds as well as part of the cult group, while the remains of the cult statues of Despoina and Demeter are displayed at the National Archaeological Museum of Athens. The most significant artifact among its collection is the veil of Despoina, displaying a complex decorative program, probably representative of the types of embroidered woven materials created by contemporary artists. Also displayed are the heads of Artemis, Demeter, Anytos, and a Tritoness, from the throne in the sanctuary.

Elements of the cult sculptural group in the National Archaeological Museum of Athens
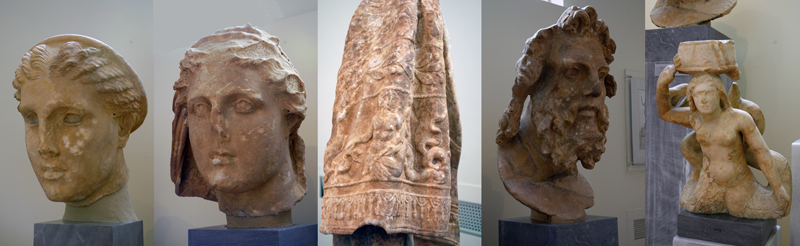
From L-R: Artemis, Demeter, Veil of Despoina, Anytos, Tritoness from the throne

== Legacy ==
After the adoption of Christianity in Greece, the epithet Despina came to be used as a devotional title for the Virgin Mary.

Despina, a satellite of Neptune, was named after the goddess Despoina.

== See also ==
- Baba Yaga
- Demeter
- Lycosura
- Mycenaean Gods
- Nephthys
- Persephone
- Poseidon
- Potnia

== General and cited references ==
- Burkert, Walter, Greek Religion, Harvard University Press, 1985. ISBN 0-674-36281-0.
- Hard, Robin, The Routledge Handbook of Greek Mythology: Based on H.J. Rose's "Handbook of Greek Mythology", Psychology Press, 2004. ISBN 978-0-415-18636-0. Google Books.
- Hathorn, Richmond Yancey, Crowell's handbook of classical drama, Thomas Y. Crowell Company (1967).
- Kerényi, Karl (1976), Dionysos: Archetypal image of indestructible life, trans. Ralph Manheim, Princeton University Press, 1976. ISBN 0-691-09863-8.
- Mylonas, George Emmanuel (1966). Mycenae and the Mycenaean Age. Princeton, NJ: Princeton University Press. ISBN 9780691035239.
- Pausanias, Pausanias Description of Greece with an English Translation by W.H.S. Jones, Litt.D., and H.A. Ormerod, M.A., in 4 Volumes. Cambridge, Massachusetts, Harvard University Press; London, William Heinemann Ltd. 1918. Online version at the Perseus Digital Library.
- Smith, William; Dictionary of Greek and Roman Biography and Mythology, London (1873). "Despoena"
