= Acrolith =

Type of composite ancient Greek sculpture

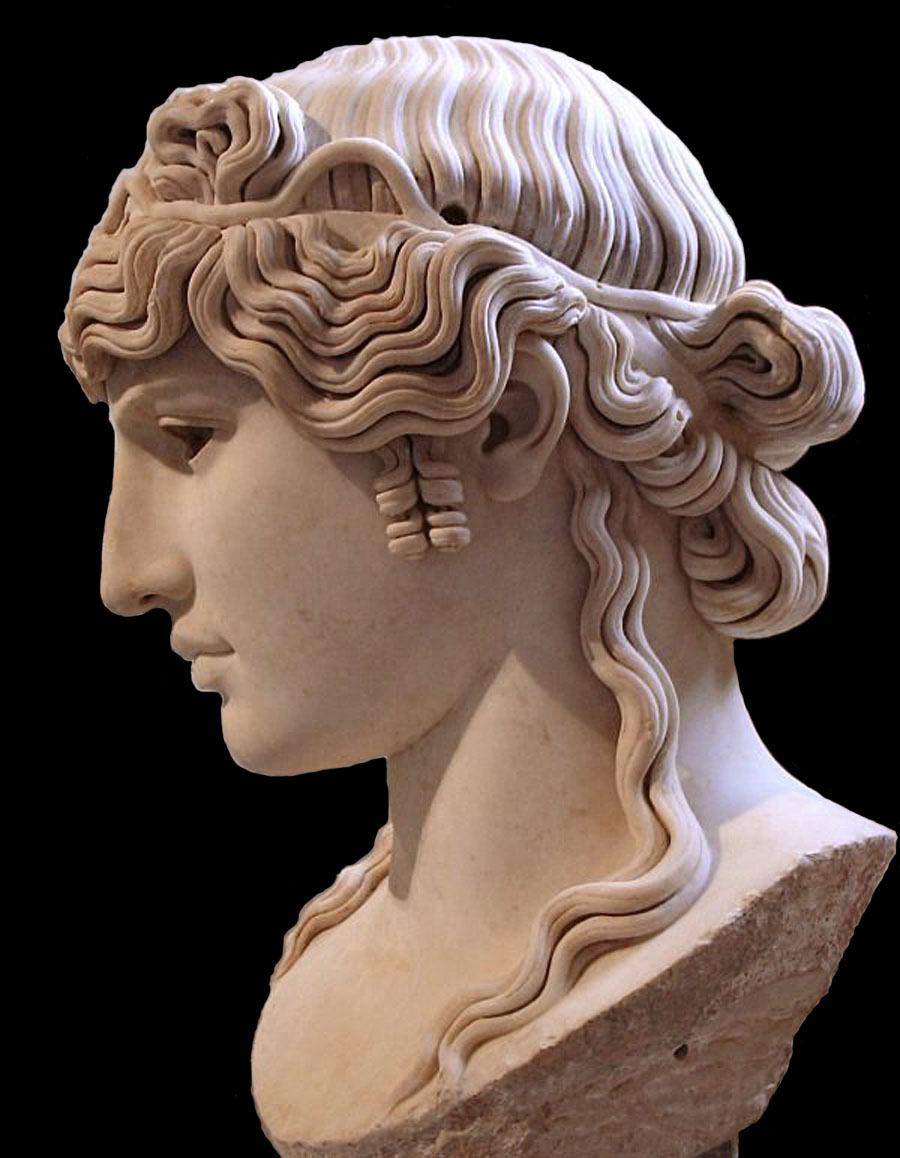
The Antinous Mondragone, the head from an acrolithic cult image of the deified Antinous

An acrolith is a composite sculpture made of stone together with other materials such as wood or inferior stone such as limestone, as in the case of a figure whose clothed parts are made of wood, while the exposed flesh parts such as head, hands, and feet are made of marble. The wood was covered either by drapery or by gilding. This type of statuary was common and widespread in Classical antiquity.

The name acrolith derives from Ancient Greek ἄκρος (ákros), meaning "extremity", and λίθος (líthos), meaning "stone".

Similarly, chryselephantine sculpture used ivory instead of marble, and often gold on parts of the body and ornaments. Acroliths are frequently mentioned by Pausanias (2nd century AD), the best known example being the Athene Areia ("Warlike Athena") of the Plataeans.

It was common practice in antiquity to drape statues with clothing. "If such statues were draped, only the visible areas of the body, the head, feet and hands needed to be rendered in an attractive material, namely stone. If the statue was not dressed, the wooden part of the body was gilded."

"This type of statue was produced where cost and availability of materials were factors. In areas where there were no native sources, marble was costly since it had to be imported and was therefore reserved for the principal or visible parts of a figure that represented flesh."

== Examples of acrolithic sculptures ==
- Athene Areia of the Plataeans
- Colossus of Constantine
- Antinous Mondragone
- Hera Farnese
- Augustus, dea Roma, Tiberius, Livia from Leptis Magna in Libya

== Secondary sources ==
- Barrett, Anthony A (2002). Livia, First Lady of Imperial Rome. Yale University Press. ISBN 978-0-300-10298-7.
