= Styx =

Goddess and river in Greek mythology

- Goddess and underworld river
- Member of The Oceanids
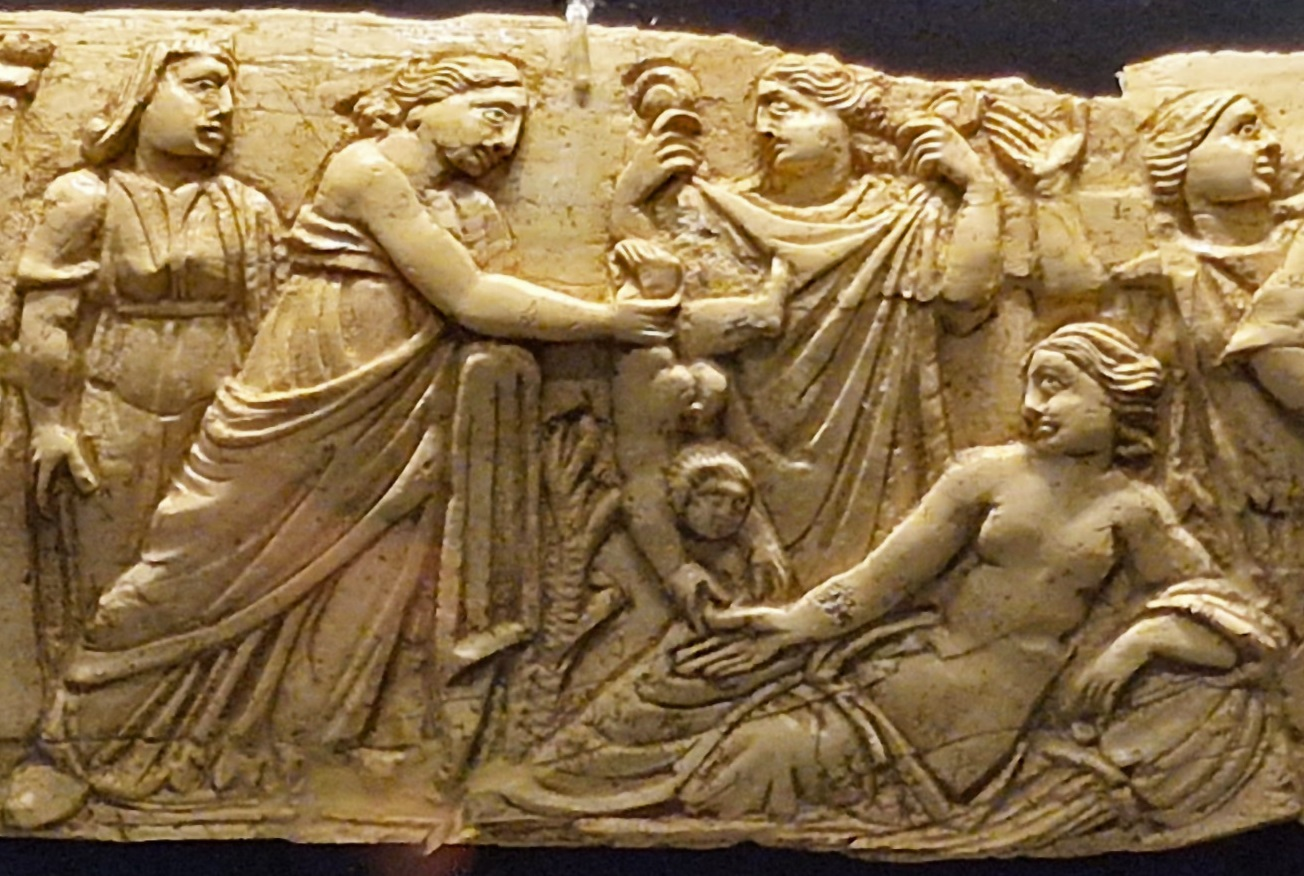
- Thetis dips Achilles in Styx, 4th century relief, Museum of Ancient Eleutherna
- Abode: Underworld

Genealogy
- Parents: Oceanus and Tethys
- Siblings: Oceanids, the river gods
- Consort: Pallas
- Children: Bia, Kratos, Nike, Zelus

In Greek mythology, Styx (/ˈstɪks/; Ancient Greek: Στύξ [stýks]; lit. "Shuddering"), also called the River Styx, is a goddess and one of the rivers of the Greek Underworld. Her parents were the Titans Oceanus and Tethys, and she was the wife of the Titan Pallas and the mother of Zelus, Nike, Kratos, and Bia. She sided with Zeus in his war against the Titans, and because of this, to honor her, Zeus decreed that the solemn oaths of the gods be sworn by the water of Styx.

== Family ==
According to the usual account, Styx was the eldest of the Oceanids, the many daughters of the Titan Oceanus, the great world-encircling river, and his sister-wife, the Titaness Tethys. However, according to the Roman mythographer Hyginus, she was the daughter of Nox ("Night", the Roman equivalent of Nyx) and Erebus (Darkness).

She married the Titan Pallas and by him gave birth to the personifications Zelus (Glory, Emulation), Nike (Victory), Kratos (Strength, Dominion), and Bia (Force, Violence). The geographer Pausanias tells us that, according to Epimenides of Crete, Styx was the mother of the monster Echidna, by an otherwise unknown Perias.

Although usually Demeter was the mother, by Zeus, of the underworld-goddess Persephone, according to the mythographer Apollodorus, it was Styx. However, when Apollodorus relates the famous story of the abduction of Persephone, and the search for her by her angry and distraught mother, as usual, it is Demeter who conducts the search.

== Mythology ==
=== Oath of the gods ===
Styx was the oath of the gods. Homer calls Styx the "dread river of oath". In both the Iliad and the Odyssey, it is said that swearing by the water of Styx is "the greatest and most dread oath for the blessed gods". Homer has Hera (in the Iliad) say this when she swears by Styx to Zeus, that she is not to blame for Poseidon's intervention on the side of the Greeks in the Trojan War, and he has Calypso (in the Odyssey) use the same words when she swears by Styx to Odysseus that she will cease to plot against him. Also Hypnos (in the Iliad) makes Hera swear to him "by the inviolable water of Styx".

Examples of oaths sworn by Styx also occur in the Homeric Hymns. Demeter asks the "implacable" water of Styx to be her witness, as she swears to Metaneira, Leto swears to the personified Delos by the water of Styx, calling it the "most powerful and dreadful oath that the blessed gods can swear", while Apollo asks Hermes to swear to him on the "dread" water of Styx.

Hesiod, in the Theogony, gives an account of how this role for Styx came about. He says that, during the Titanomachy, the great war of Zeus and his fellow Olympians against Cronus and his fellow Titans, Zeus summoned "all the deathless gods to great Olympus" and promised, to whosoever would join him against the Titans, that he would preserve whatever rights and offices each had, or if they had none under Cronus, they would be given both under his rule. Styx, upon the advice of her father Oceanus, was the first to side with Zeus, bringing her children by Pallas along with her. And so in return Zeus appointed Styx to be "the great oath of the gods, and her children to live with him always."

According to Hesiod, Styx lived at the entrance to Hades, in a cave "propped up to heaven all round with silver pillars". Hesiod also tells us that Zeus would send Iris, the messenger of the gods, to fetch the "famous cold water" of Styx for the gods to swear by, and describes the punishments which would follow the breaking of such an oath:

For whoever of the deathless gods that hold the peaks of snowy Olympus pours a libation of her water and is forsworn, must lie breathless until a full year is completed, and never come near to taste ambrosia and nectar, but lie spiritless and voiceless on a strewn bed: and a heavy trance overshadows him. But when he has spent a long year in his sickness, another penance more hard follows after the first. For nine years he is cut off from the eternal gods and never joins their councils or their feasts, nine full years. But in the tenth year he comes again to join the assemblies of the deathless gods who live in the house of Olympus.

The Roman poet Ovid has Jove (the Roman equivalent of Zeus) swear by the waters of Styx when he promises Semele:

Whatever thy wish, it shall not be denied,
and that thy heart shall suffer no distrust,
I pledge me by that Deity, the Waves
of the deep Stygian Lake,—oath of the Gods.

and was then obliged to follow through even though he realized to his horror that Semele's request would lead to her death. Similarly Sol (the Roman equivalent of the Greek Helios) promised his son Phaethon whatever he desired, which also resulted in the boy's death after he asked to drive his father's chariot for a day.

=== River ===
The goddess Styx, like her father Oceanus, and his sons the river gods, was also a river, in her case, a river of the Underworld. According to Hesiod, Styx was given one-tenth of her father's water, which flowed far underground, and came up to the surface to pour out from a high rock:

the famous cold water ... trickles down from a high and beetling rock. Far under the wide-pathed earth a branch of Oceanus flows through the dark night out of the holy stream, and a tenth part of his water is allotted to her.

In the Iliad the river Styx forms a boundary of Hades, the abode of the dead, in the Underworld. Athena mentions the "sheer-falling waters of Styx" needing to be crossed when Heracles returned from Hades after capturing Cerberus, and Patroclus's shade begs Achilles to bury his corpse quickly so that he might "pass within the gates of Hades" and join the other dead "beyond the River". So too in Virgil's Aeneid, where the Styx winds nine times around the borders of Hades, and the boatman Charon is in charge of ferrying the dead across it. More usually, however, Acheron is the river (or lake) which separates the world of the living from the world of the dead.

In the Odyssey, Circe says that the Underworld river Cocytus is a branch of the Styx. In Dante's Inferno, Phlegyas ferries Virgil and Dante across the foul waters of the river Styx which is portrayed as a marsh comprising the Hell's Fifth Circle, where the angry and sullen are punished.

By metonymy, the adjective stygian (/ˈstɪdʒiən/) came to refer to anything unpleasantly dark, gloomy, or forbidding.

=== Other ===
In the Homeric Hymn 2 to Demeter Persephone names Styx as one of her "frolicking" Oceanid-companions when she was abducted by Hades.

According to the Achilleid, written by the Roman poet Statius in the 1st century AD, when Achilles was born his mother Thetis tried to make him immortal by dipping him in the river Styx; however, he was left vulnerable at the part of the body by which she held him: his left heel. And so Paris was able to kill Achilles during the Trojan War by shooting an arrow into his heel.

In the second-century Metamorphoses of Apuleius, one of the impossible trials which Venus imposed on Psyche was to fetch water from the Styx. Apuleius has the water guarded by fierce dragons (dracones), and from the water itself came fearsome cries of deadly warning. The sheer impossibility of her task caused Psyche to become senseless, as if turned into stone. Jupiter's eagle admonishes Psyche saying:

Do you ... really expect to be able to steal, or even touch, a single drop from that holiest—and cruelest—of springs? Even the gods and Jupiter himself are frightened of these Stygian waters. You must know that, at least by hearsay, and that, as you swear by the powers of the gods, so the gods always swear by the majesty of the Styx.

== The Arcadian Styx ==
Styx, along with the underworld rivers Cocytus and Acheron, were associated with waterways in the upper world. For example, according to Homer, the river Titaressus, a tributary of the river Peneius in Thessaly, was a branch of the Styx. However Styx has been most commonly associated with an Arcadian stream and waterfall (the Mavronéri) that runs through a ravine on the North face of mount Chelmos and flows into the Krathis river. The fifth-century BC historian Herodotus, locates this stream—calling it "the water of Styx"—as being near Nonacris a town (in what was then ancient Arcadia and now modern Achaea) not far from Pheneus, and says that the Spartan king Cleomenes, would make men take oaths swearing by its water. Herodotus describes it as "a stream of small appearance, dropping from a cliff into a pool; a wall of stones runs round the pool". Pausanias reports visiting the "water of the Styx" near Nonacris (which at the time of his visit, in the second century AD, was already a partially-buried ruin), saying that:

Not far from the ruins is a high cliff; I know of none other that rises to so great a height. A water trickles down the cliff, called by the Greeks the water of the Styx.

According to Aelian, Demeter caused the water of this Arcadian Styx "to well up in the neighbourhood of Pheneus". An ancient legend apparently also connected Demeter with this Styx. According to Photius, a certain Ptolemy Hephaestion (probably referring to Ptolemy Chennus) knew of a story, "concerning the water of the Styx in Arcadia", which told how an angry Demeter had turned the Styx's water black. According to James George Frazer, this "fable" provided an explanation for the fact that, from a distance, the waterfall appears black.

Water from this Styx was said to be poisonous and able to dissolve most substances. The first-century natural philosopher Pliny, wrote that drinking its water caused immediate death, and that the hoof of a female mule was the only material not "rotted" by its water. According to Plutarch the poisonous water could only be held by an ass's hoof, since all other vessels would "be eaten through by it, owing to its coldness and pungency." While according to Pausanias, the only vessel that could hold the Styx's water (poisonous to both men and animals) was a horse's hoof. There were ancient suspicions that Alexander the Great's death was caused by being poisoned with the water of this Styx.

The Arcadian Styx may have been named so after its mythological counterpart, but it is also possible that this Arcadian stream was the model for the mythological Styx. The latter seems to be the case, at least, for the Styx in Apuleius's Metamorphoses, which has Venus, addressing Psyche, give the following description:

Do you see that steep mountain-peak standing above the towering cliff? Dark waves flow down from a black spring on that peak and are enclosed by the reservoir formed by the valley nearby, to water the swamps of Styx and feed the rasping currents of Cocytus.

That Apuleius has his "black spring" being guarded by dragons, also suggests a connection between his Styx and two modern local names for the waterfall: the Black Water (Mavro Nero) and the Dragon Water (Drako Nero).

== Moon ==
On 2 July 2013, "Styx" officially became the name of one of Pluto's moons. The other moons of Pluto (Charon, Nix, Hydra, and Kerberos) also have names from Greco-Roman mythology related to the underworld.

== Genealogy ==
Styx's genealogy

Uranus	Gaia
Oceanus	Tethys
River gods	Oceanids	STYX	Pallas
Zelus	Nike	Kratos	Bia

== Gallery ==
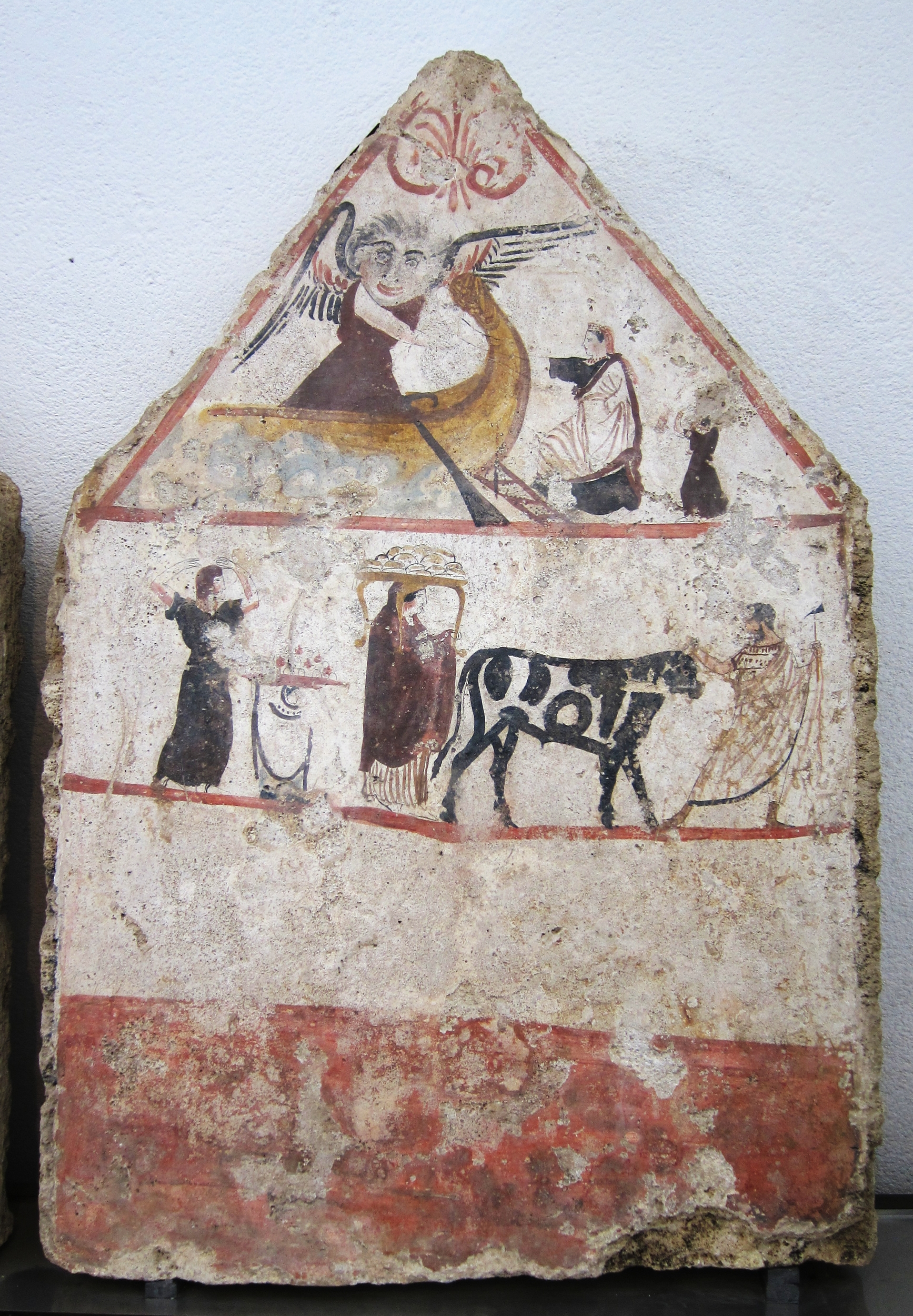
Ferryman Charon embarks with the soul of the deceased. Fresco from an ancient Lucanian tomb.

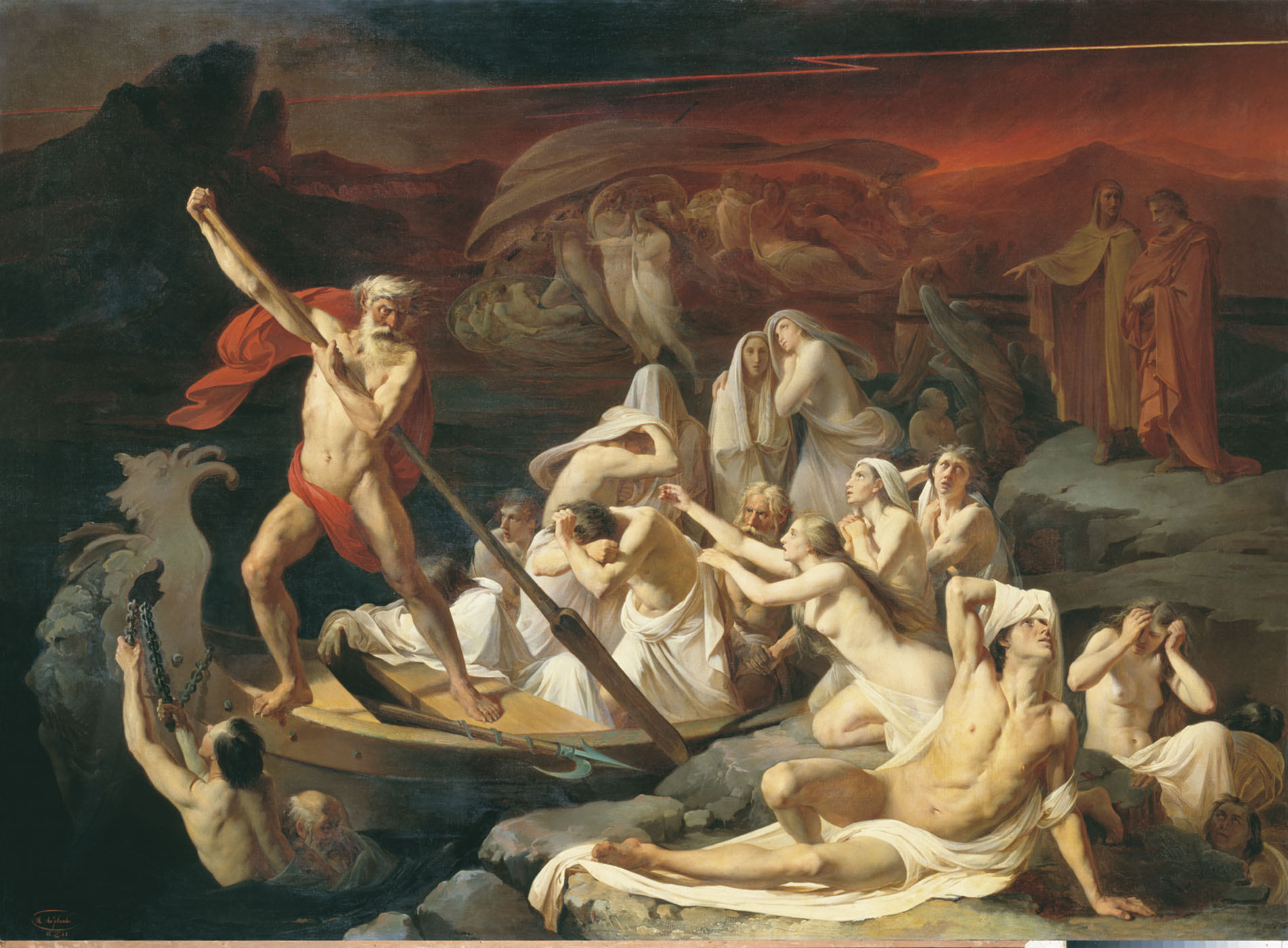
Charon carries souls across the river Styx by Alexander Dmitrievich Litovchenko.

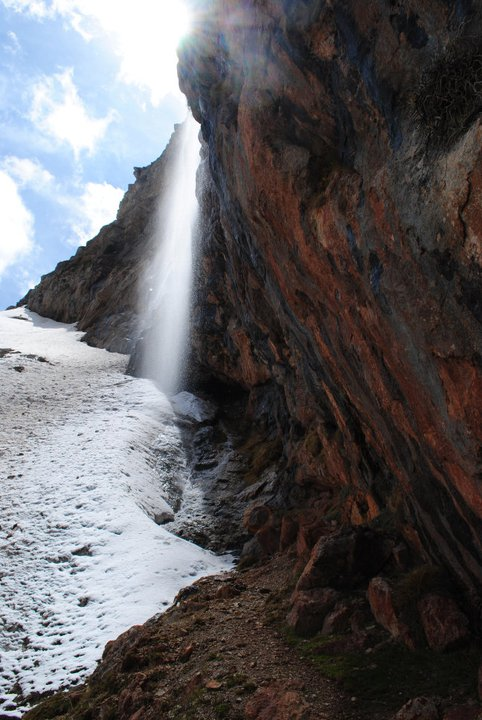
The waters of one possible source for the mythical Styx in the Aroanian mountains.

== See also ==
- Gjöll - Norse mythology
- Hitfun - Mandaean mythology
- Hubur - Mesopotamian mythology
- Sanzu River - Japanese Buddhism
- Vaitarna River (mythological) - Hinduism and Buddhism
- Stygimoloch
- Styxosaurus

== Bibliography ==
=== Ancient sources ===
- Aelian, On Animals, Volume II: Books 6-11, translated by A. F. Scholfield, Loeb Classical Library No. 448, Cambridge, Massachusetts, Harvard University Press, 1959. Online version at Harvard University Press. ISBN 978-0-674-99493-5.
- Aeschylus, Seven Against Thebes in Aeschylus: Persians. Seven against Thebes. Suppliants. Prometheus Bound. Edited and translated by Alan H. Sommerstein. Loeb Classical Library No. 145. Cambridge, Massachusetts: Harvard University Press, 2009. ISBN 978-0-674-99627-4. Online version at Harvard University Press.
- Apollodorus, Apollodorus, The Library, with an English Translation by Sir James George Frazer, F.B.A., F.R.S. in 2 Volumes. Cambridge, Massachusetts, Harvard University Press; London, William Heinemann Ltd. 1921. ISBN 0-674-99135-4. Online version at the Perseus Digital Library.
- Apuleius, Metamorphoses (The Golden Ass), Volume I: Books 1-6, edited and translated by J. Arthur Hanson. Loeb Classical Library No. 44. Cambridge, Massachusetts: Harvard University Press, 1996. Online version at Harvard University Press.
- Arrian, Anabasis of Alexander, Volume II: Books 5–7, translated by P. A. Brunt, Loeb Classical Library No. 269, Cambridge, Massachusetts, Harvard University Press, 1976. ISBN 978-0-674-99297-9. Online version at Harvard University Press.
- Callimachus, Callimachus and Lycophron with an English Translation by A. W. Mair; Aratus, with an English Translation by G. R. Mair, London: W. Heinemann, New York: G. P. Putnam 1921. Internet Archive.
- Dante, Inferno, in The Divine Comedy of Dante, Henry Wadsworth Longfellow (translator), Kessinger Publishing (2004). ISBN 1-4191-5994-1.
- Euripides, Alcestis in Euripides: Cyclops, Alcestis, Medea, edited and translated by David Kovacs, Loeb Classical Library No. 12, Cambridge, Massachusetts, Harvard University Press, 2001. ISBN 978-0-674-99560-4. Online version at Harvard University Press.
- Herodotus, Histories, A. D. Godley (translator), Cambridge, Massachusetts: Harvard University Press, 1920; ISBN 0674991338. Online version at the Perseus Digital Library.
- Hesiod, Theogony, in The Homeric Hymns and Homerica with an English Translation by Hugh G. Evelyn-White, Cambridge, Massachusetts, Harvard University Press; London, William Heinemann Ltd. 1914. Online version at the Perseus Digital Library.
- Homer, The Iliad with an English Translation by A.T. Murray, Ph.D. in two volumes. Cambridge, Massachusetts, Harvard University Press; London, William Heinemann, Ltd. 1924. Online version at the Perseus Digital Library.
- Homer, The Odyssey with an English Translation by A.T. Murray, PH.D. in two volumes. Cambridge, Massachusetts, Harvard University Press; London, William Heinemann, Ltd. 1919. Online version at the Perseus Digital Library.
- Homeric Hymn 2 to Demeter, in Homeric Hymns. Homeric Apocrypha. Lives of Homer, edited and translated by Martin L. West, Loeb Classical Library No. 496, Cambridge, Massachusetts, Harvard University Press, 2003. ISBN 978-0-674-99606-9. Online version at Harvard University Press.
- Homeric Hymn 3 to Apollo, in Homeric Hymns. Homeric Apocrypha. Lives of Homer, edited and translated by Martin L. West, Loeb Classical Library No. 496, Cambridge, Massachusetts, Harvard University Press, 2003. ISBN 978-0-674-99606-9. Online version at Harvard University Press.
- Homeric Hymn 4 to Hermes, in Homeric Hymns. Homeric Apocrypha. Lives of Homer, edited and translated by Martin L. West, Loeb Classical Library No. 496, Cambridge, Massachusetts, Harvard University Press, 2003. ISBN 978-0-674-99606-9. Online version at Harvard University Press.
- Hyginus, Gaius Julius, Fabulae, in The Myths of Hyginus, edited and translated by Mary A. Grant, Lawrence: University of Kansas Press, 1960. Online version at ToposText.
- Nonnus, Dionysiaca, Volume I: Books 1–15, translated by W. H. D. Rouse, Loeb Classical Library No. 344, Cambridge, Massachusetts, Harvard University Press, 1940 (revised 1984). ISBN 978-0-674-99379-2. Online version at Harvard University Press. Internet Archive (1940).
- Ovid, Metamorphoses, Brookes More, Boston, Cornhill Publishing Co. 1922. Online version at the Perseus Digital Library.
- Pausanias, Description of Greece with an English Translation by W.H.S. Jones, Litt.D., and H.A. Ormerod, M.A., in 4 Volumes. Cambridge, Massachusetts, Harvard University Press; London, William Heinemann Ltd. 1918. Online version at the Perseus Digital Library.
- Plato, Phaedo in Plato in Twelve Volumes, Vol. 1 translated by Harold N. Fowler, Cambridge, Massachusetts, Harvard University Press; London, William Heinemann Ltd. 1966. Online version at the Perseus Digital Library.
- Pliny, Natural History, Volume VIII: Books 28-32, translated by W. H. S. Jones, Loeb Classical Library No. 418, Cambridge, Massachusetts, Harvard University Press, 1963. ISBN 978-0-674-99460-7. Online version at Harvard University Press.
- Plutarch, Alexander in Lives, Volume VII: Demosthenes and Cicero, Alexander and Caesar, translated by Bernadotte Perrin. Loeb Classical Library No. 99. Cambridge, Massachusetts: Harvard University Press, 1919. ISBN 978-0-674-99110-1. Online version at the Perseus Digital Library.
- Sophocles, Antigone in Sophocles: Antigone. The Women of Trachis. Philoctetes. Oedipus at Colonus Edited and translated by Hugh Lloyd-Jones, Loeb Classical Library No. 21, Cambridge, Massachusetts, Harvard University Press, 1994. ISBN 978-0-674-99558-1. Online version at Harvard University Press.
- Statius, Statius with an English Translation by J. H. Mozley, Volume II, Thebaid, Books V–XII, Achilleid, Loeb Classical Library No. 207, London: William Heinemann, Ltd., New York: G. P. Putnamm's Sons, 1928. ISBN 978-0674992283. Internet Archive.
- Strabo, Geography, translated by Horace Leonard Jones; Cambridge, Massachusetts: Harvard University Press; London: William Heinemann, Ltd. (1924). LacusCurtis, Online version at the Perseus Digital Library, Books 6–14.
- Virgil, Aeneid [books 1–6], in Eclogues, Georgics, Aeneid: Books 1-6, translated by H. Rushton Fairclough, revised by G. P. Goold, Loeb Classical Library No. 63, Cambridge, Massachusetts, Harvard University Press, 1999. ISBN 978-0-674-99583-3. Online version at Harvard University Press.

=== Modern sources ===
- Antoni, Silke, s.v. Styx in Brill's New Pauly, Antiquity volumes edited by: Hubert Cancik and Helmuth Schneider, English Edition by: Christine F. Salazar, Classical Tradition volumes edited by: Manfred Landfester, English Edition by: Francis G. Gentry. Online version.
- Athanassakis, Apostolos N, Hesiod: Theogony, Works and days, Shield, JHU Press, 2004. ISBN 978-0-8018-7984-5.
- Burgess, Jonathan S., The Death and Afterlife of Achilles, JHU Press, 2009. ISBN 978-0-8018-9029-1.
- Campbell, David A., Greek Lyric, Volume I: Sappho and Alcaeus, Loeb Classical Library No. 142, Cambridge, Massachusetts, Harvard University Press, 1990. ISBN 0-674-99157-5. Online version at Harvard University Press.
- Chisholm, Hugh, ed. (1911). "Styx" . Encyclopædia Britannica (11th ed.). Cambridge University Press.
- Fowler, R. L. (2000), Early Greek Mythography: Volume 1: Text and Introduction, Oxford University Press, 2000. ISBN 978-0198147404.
- Fowler, R. L. (2013), Early Greek Mythography: Volume 2: Commentary, Oxford University Press, 2013. ISBN 978-0198147411.
- Gantz, Timothy, Early Greek Myth: A Guide to Literary and Artistic Sources, Johns Hopkins University Press, 1996, Two volumes: ISBN 978-0-8018-5360-9 (Vol. 1), ISBN 978-0-8018-5362-3 (Vol. 2).
- Frazer, J. G., Pausanias's Description of Greece. Translated with a Commentary by J. G. Frazer. Vol IV. Commentary on Books VI-VIII, Macmillan, 1898. Internet Archive
- Grimal, Pierre, The Dictionary of Classical Mythology, Wiley-Blackwell, 1996. ISBN 978-0-631-20102-1. Internet Archive.
- Hard, Robin (2004), The Routledge Handbook of Greek Mythology: Based on H.J. Rose's "Handbook of Greek Mythology", Psychology Press, 2004, ISBN 9780415186360. Google Books.
- Jost, Madeleine, s.v. Styx in Oxford Classical Dictionary, digital edition
- Mayor, Adrienne, "Alexander the Great: A Questionable Death" in History of Toxicology and Environmental Health: Toxicology in Antiquity Volume I, Philip Wexler (editor), Academic Press, 2014. ISBN 978-0-12-800463-0.
- Parada, Carlos, Genealogical Guide to Greek Mythology, Jonsered, Paul Åströms Förlag, 1993. ISBN 978-91-7081-062-6.
- Reclus, Onésime, A Bird's-eye View of the World, Ticknor, 1892.
- Smith, William, Dictionary of Greek and Roman Biography and Mythology, London (1873). Online version at the Perseus Digital Library.
- Tripp, Edward, Crowell's Handbook of Classical Mythology, Thomas Y. Crowell Co; First edition (June 1970). ISBN 069022608X.
- West, M. L. (1966), Hesiod: Theogony, Oxford University Press. ISBN 0-19-814169-6.
- West, M. L. (2003), Homeric Hymns. Homeric Apocrypha. Lives of Homer, edited and translated by Martin L. West, Loeb Classical Library No. 496, Cambridge, Massachusetts, Harvard University Press, 2003. ISBN 978-0-674-99606-9. Online version at Harvard University Press.
