= Crathis =

Crathis may refer to:

- Crati, a river of southern Italy
- Krathis, a river of southern Greece
