= Agia Varvara, Akrata =

Agia Varvara Αγία Βαρβάρα
- Community
- Location within Greece
- Coordinates: 38°00′N 22°16′E
- Country: Greece
- Administrative region: Western Greece
- Regional unit: Achaea
- Municipality: Aigialeia
- Municipal unit: Akrata
- Elevation: 1,095 m (3,593 ft)

Population (2021)
  - Community: 128
- Time zone: UTC+2 (EET)
  - Summer (DST): UTC+3 (EEST)
- Postal code: 270 55
- Vehicle registration: AX

Agia Varvara (Greek: Αγία Βαρβάρα) is a small village and a community in the municipal unit of Akrata, Achaea, Greece. The community includes the village Vounaki. It is built on the forested slopes of Mount Chelmos (Aroania). It is 3 km east of Mesorrougi, 15 km east of Kalavryta and 17 km south of Akrata. Between 1835 and 1912, Agia Varvara constituted a part of the municipality of Nonakrida, and between 1912 and 1996 it was an independent community.

== Population ==
Year	Population
1981	117
1991	175
2001	279
2011	66
2021	128

== See also ==
- List of settlements in Achaea
