= Nonacris =

Town in Arcadia, Pheneatis, ancient Greece

Coordinates: 38°01′08″N 22°15′18″E

Nonacris or Nonakris (Ancient Greek: Νώνακρις) was a town of ancient Arcadia in the region of Pheneatis northwest of Pheneus, situated in what is now Achaea, southern Greece.

It was named after the wife of Lycaon, Nonacris (Νωνακρίς), and was part of the state of Pheneus. It was located near a cliff from which water thought to be that of the Styx trickled. By the time Pausanias visited the city, it was completely in ruins. The town is also noted by the ancient writers Herodotus, Stephanus of Byzantium, Pliny the Elder, Seneca, and Ovid. From this place Hermes is called Nonacriates Evander Nonacrius, Atalanta Nonacria, and Callisto Nonacrina virgo, in the general sense of Arcadian.

Between 1835 and 1912, there was a municipality named Nonakrida (Greek: Νωνάκριδα) named after the ancient city. It consisted of the villages Peristera, Mikros Pontias, Mesorrougi, Agia Varvara and Zarouchla, situated in the modern municipal units of Kalavryta and Akrata.

Some archaeologists have suggested that the ancient city was located around the modern village of Kerpini, Kalavryta municipality. Around Kerpini, they found an ancient temple, coins, buildings, and other signs of settlement.

Modern scholars place its site near the modern Solos.
