= Tsivlos =

Village in Greece

Tsivlos Τσιβλός
- Settlement
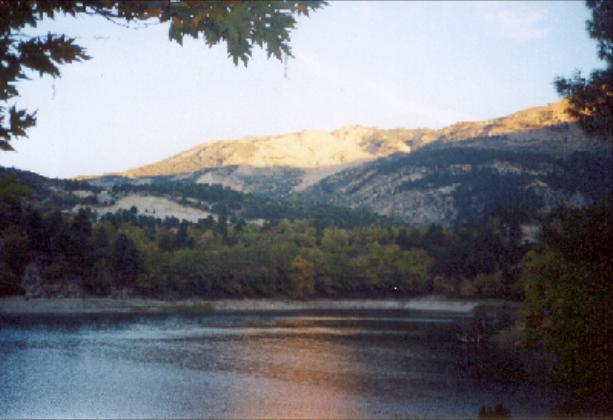
- Tsivlos lake

- Location within Greece
- Coordinates: 38°04′N 22°14′E
- Country: Greece
- Administrative region: West Greece
- Regional unit: Achaea
- Municipality: Aigialeia
- Municipal unit: Akrata
- Community: Platanos

Population (2021)
  - Total: 2
- Time zone: UTC+2 (EET)
  - Summer (DST): UTC+3 (EEST)

Tsivlos (Greek: Τσιβλός) is a small mountain village in the municipality of Akrata, Achaea, Greece. It is part of the community Platanos. In 2011, it had a population of 9. It is built on the slopes of Mount Chelmos (Aroania), above the river Krathis, at about 750 m elevation. Lake Tsivlos, north of the village, was formed by a landslide in 1912. Tsivlos is located 12 km southwest of Akrata, 12 km northeast of Kalavryta and 11 km south of Platanos.

== Population ==
Historical population
Year	Pop.	±%
1991	24	—
2001	21	−12.5%
2011	9	−57.1%
2021	2	−77.8%

== History ==
Tsivlos was mentioned as the settlement of Civlò in the census of the Venetian Francesco Grimani in 1700; it had 33 families and 148 inhabitants. Until 1912, Tsivlos was a part of the municipality of Nonakrida. The village was part of the municipality of Akrata since 1998. In 2011 it became part of the new municipality Aigialeia.

On Sunday March 24, 1913, a large volume of rocks and soil fell from the nearby mountain of Gerakari which devastated the village of Sylivaina and fell into the Krathis river. The river water flooded a large part of Tsivlos, creating a lake with a depth of 80 m and an area of around 200 hectares. The inhabitants of the two villages had relocated two days before the disaster.

== Gallery ==
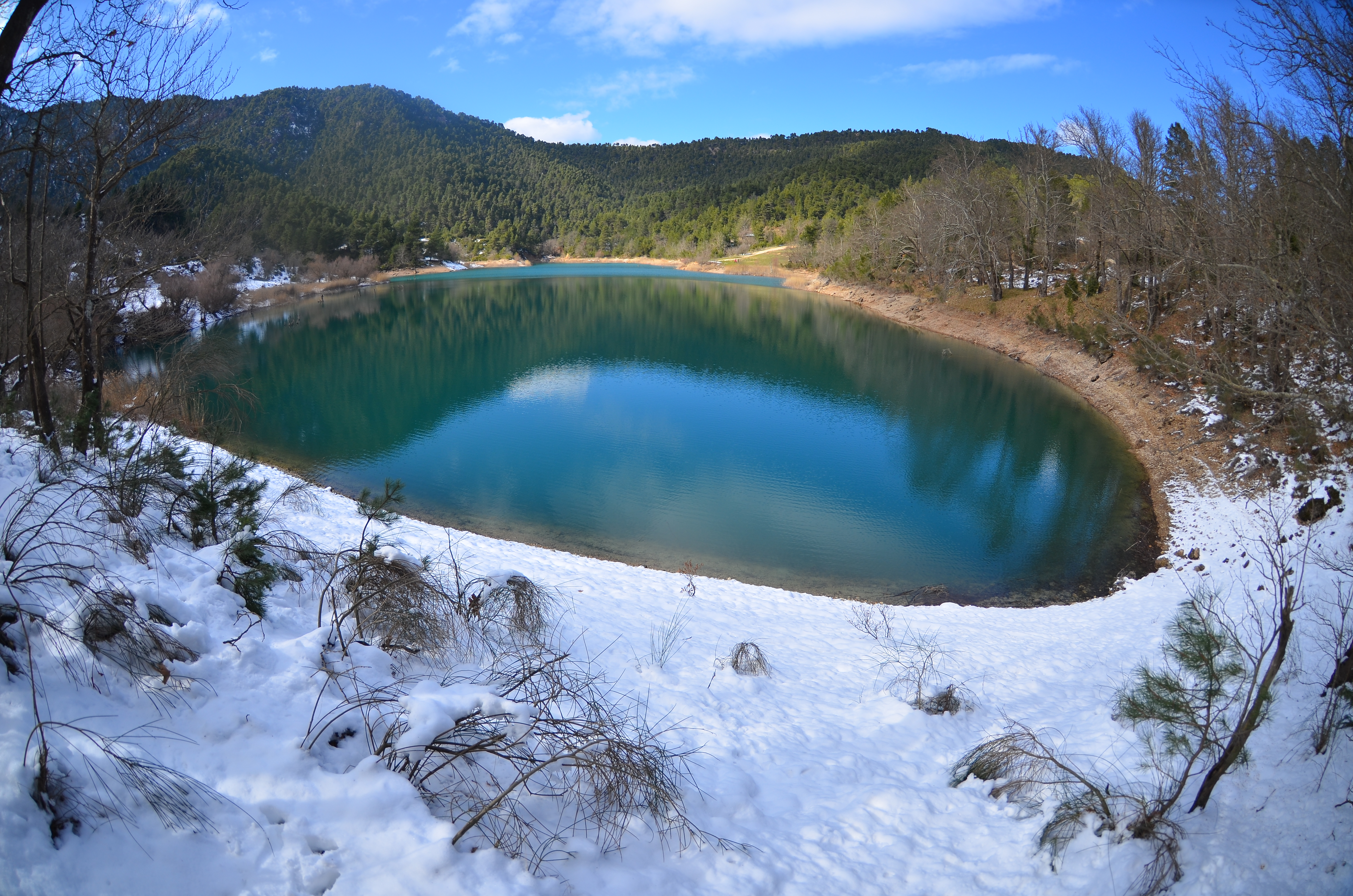
Panoramic view of Lake Tsivlos.

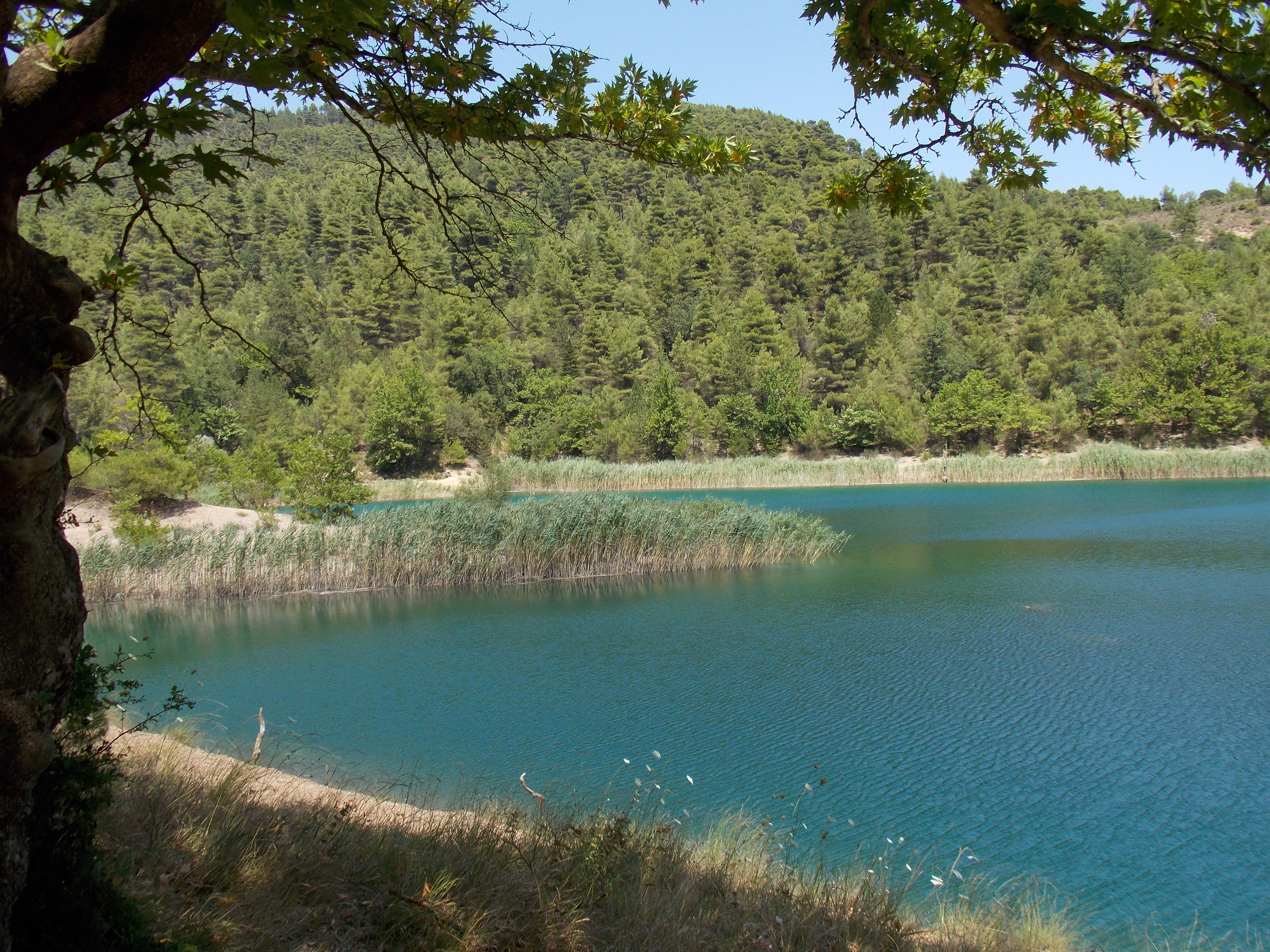
Partial view of Lake Tsivlos.

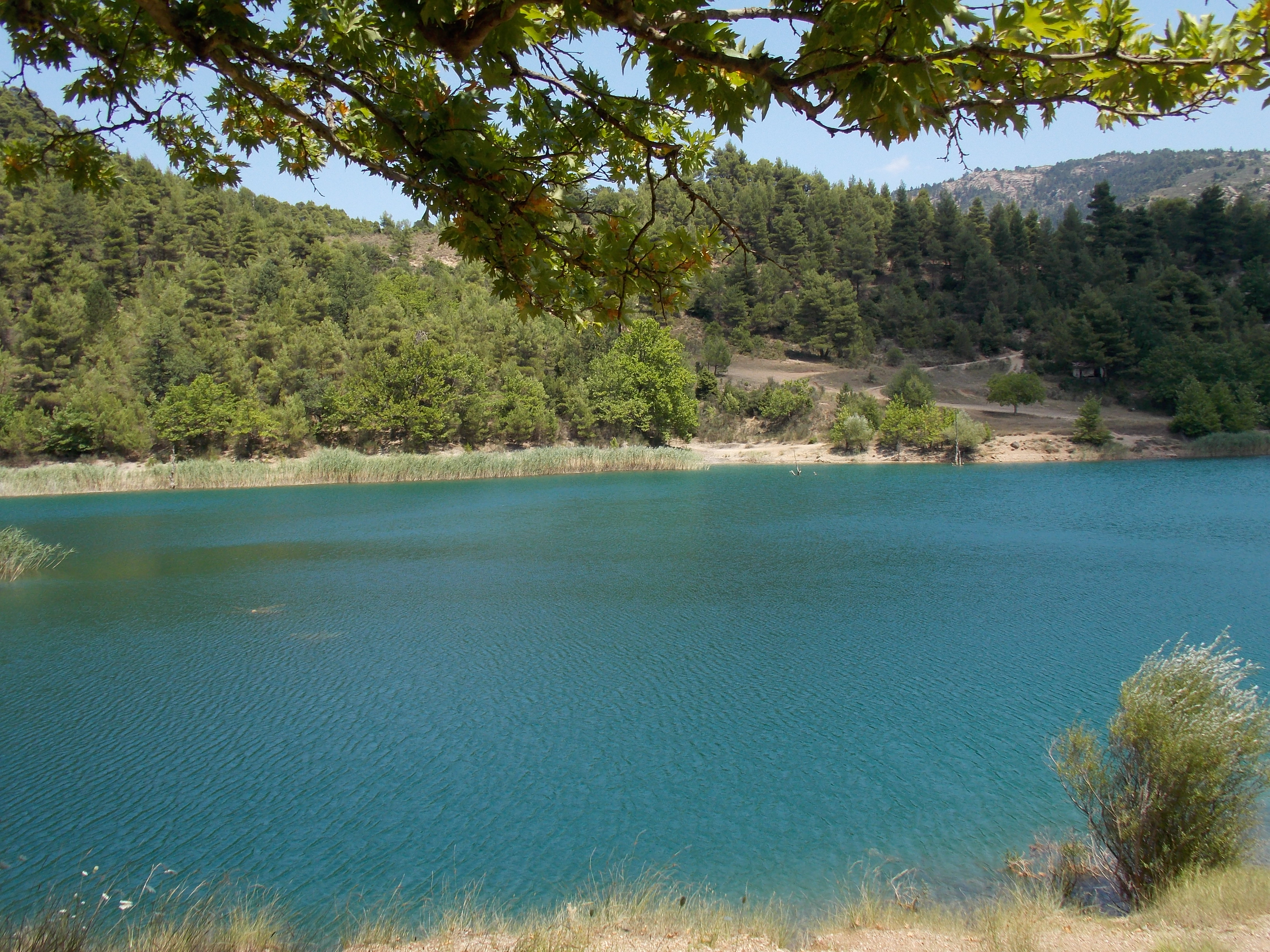
Partial view of Lake Tsivlos.

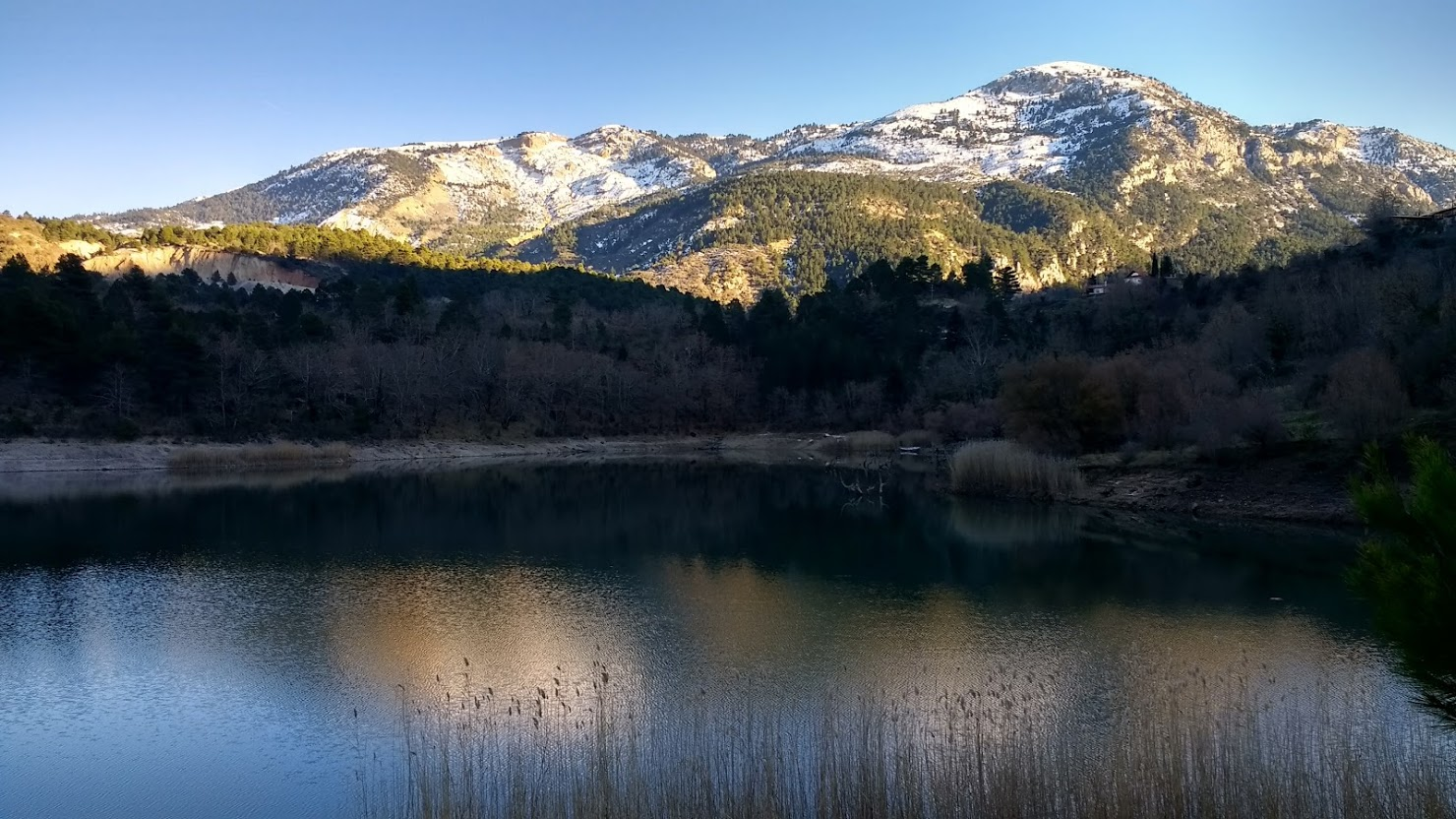
Partial view of Lake Tsivlos.

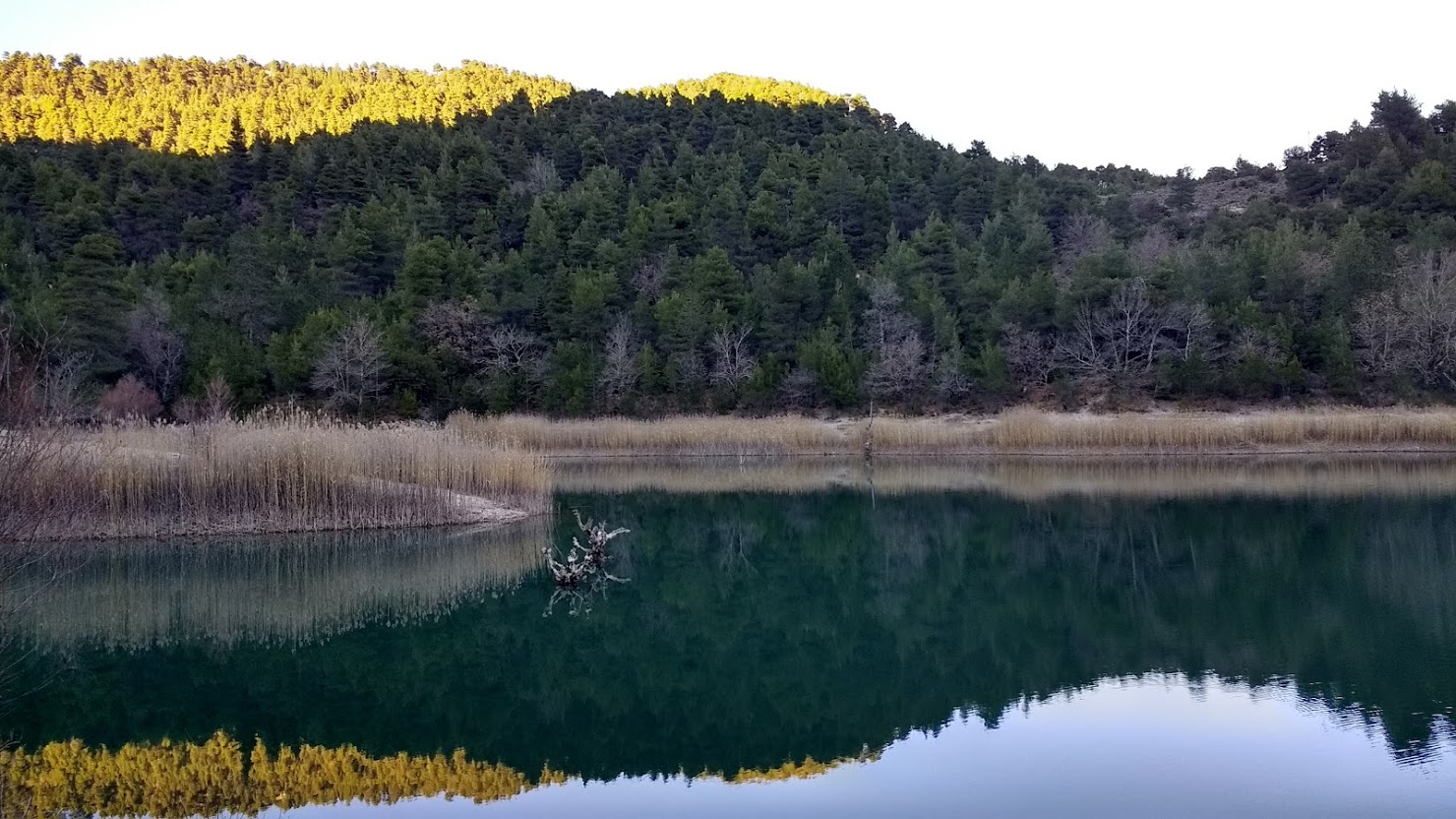
Partial view of Lake Tsivlos.

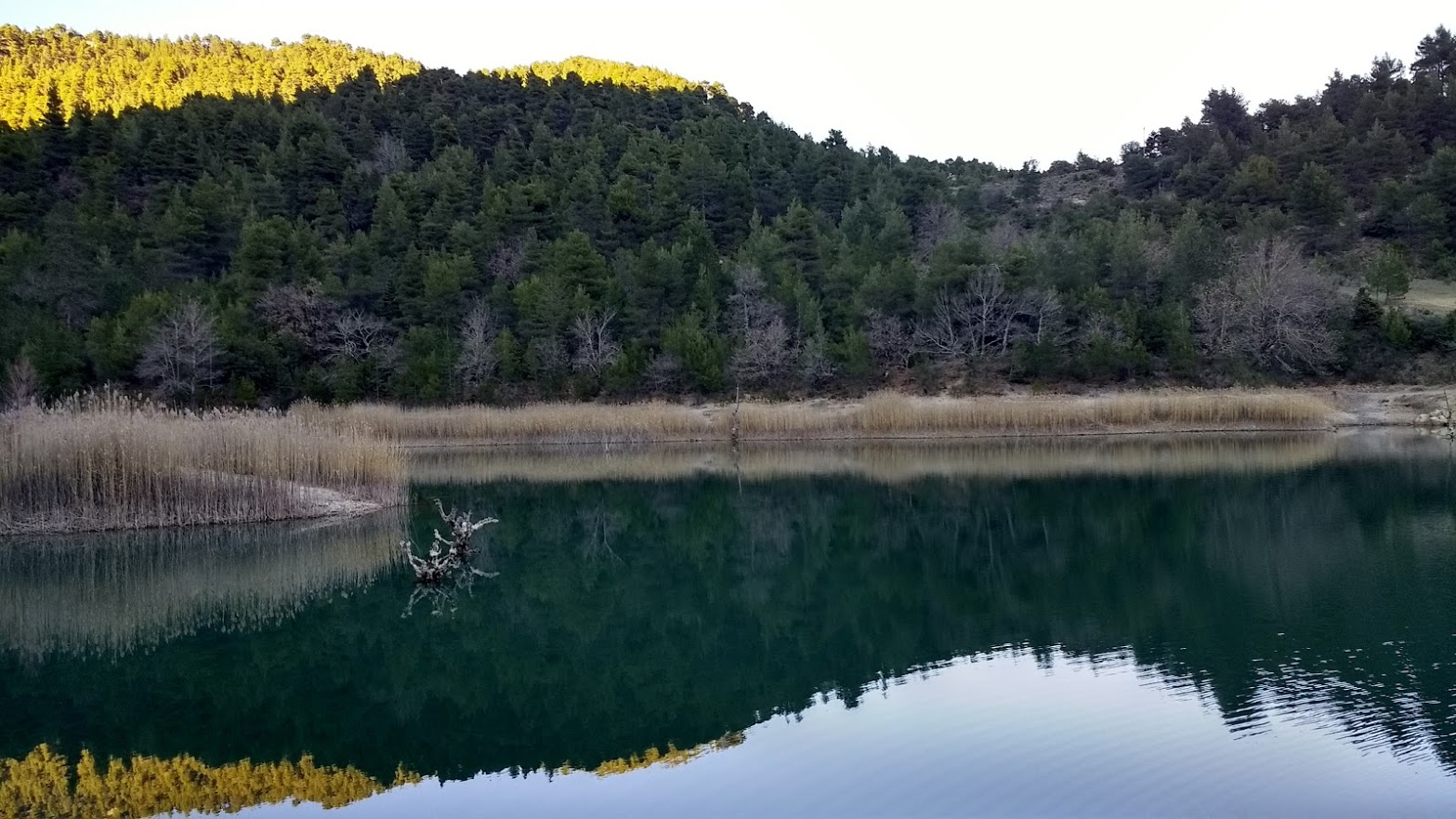
Partial view of Lake Tsivlos.

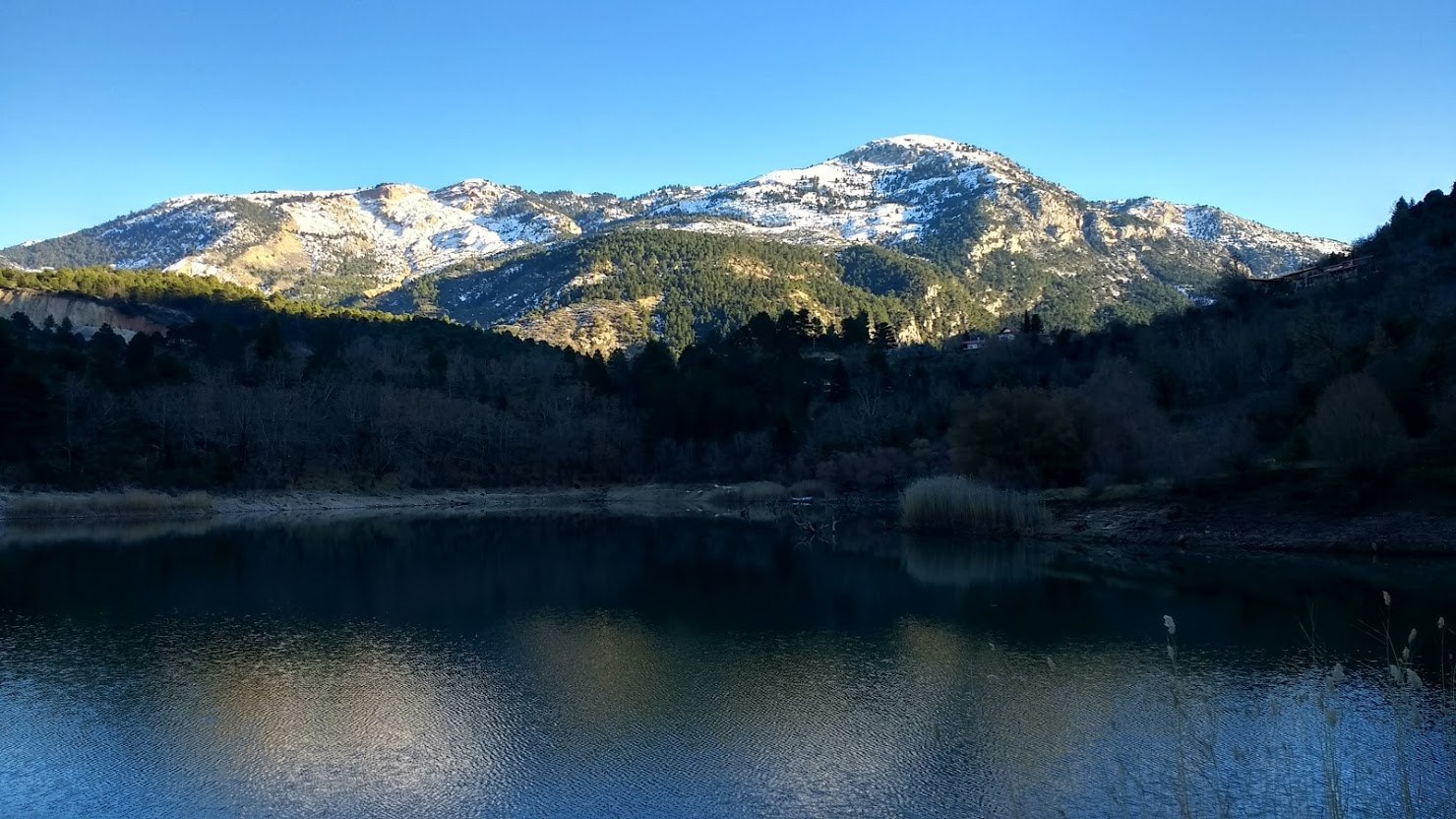
Partial view of Lake Tsivlos.

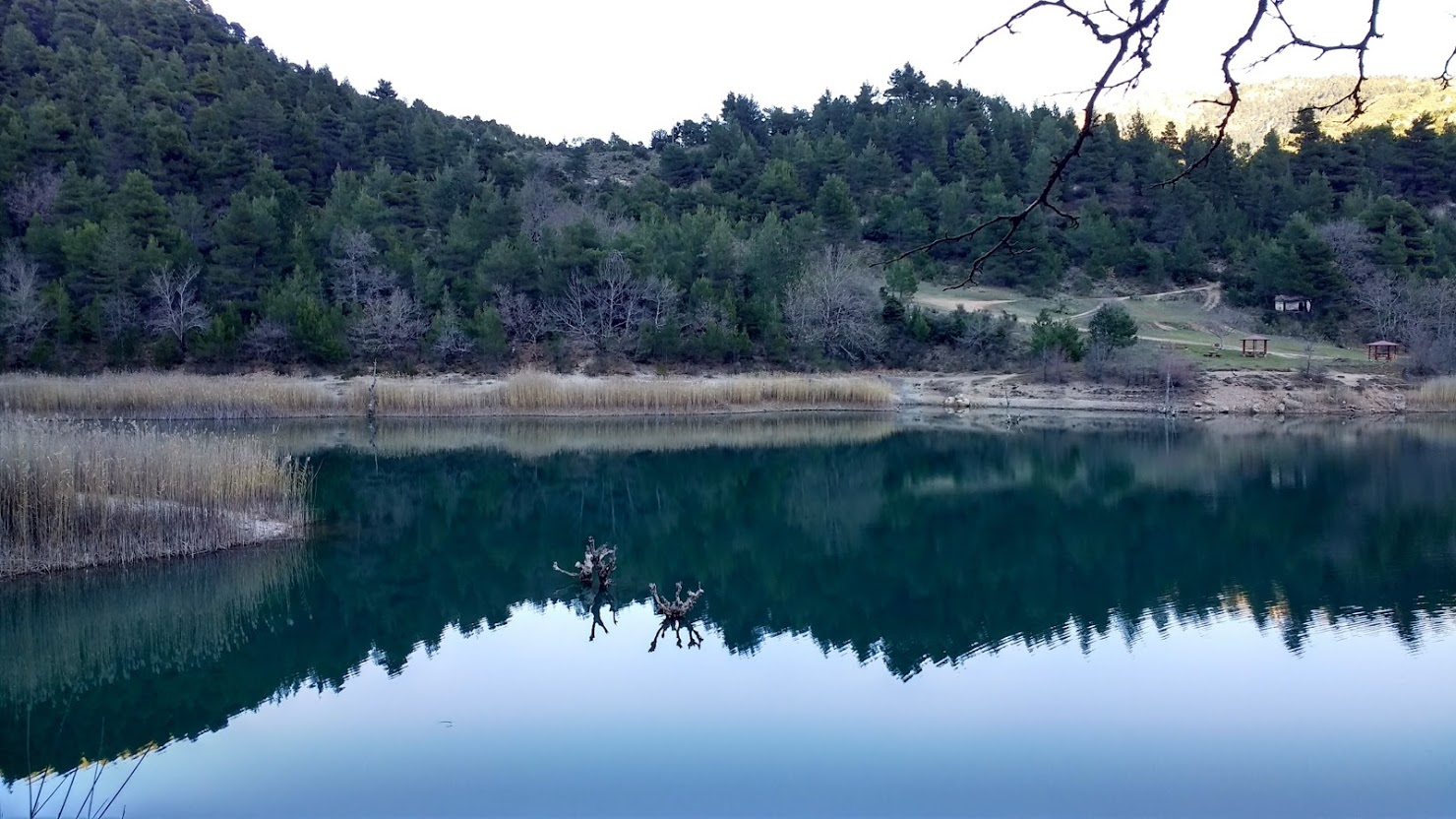
Partial view of Lake Tsivlos.

== See also ==
- List of settlements in Achaea
