= Styx (newspaper) =

Greek newspaper

Styx Στύξ
- Type: Weekly
- Format: N/A
- Owner(s): N/A
- Founded: 2004
- Headquarters: Patras, Greece
- Website: www.styga.gr

Styx (Greek: Στύξ) is a weekly newspaper that features local and general information. It is based in Akrata in the eastern part of Achaea, Greece. It was first published in 2004. It is the Independent Cultural and Political Newspaper of the Northern Peloponnese. Its editor-in-chief is Vasileios Antoniou.

== See also ==
- List of newspapers in Greece
