= Paralia Platanou =

Paralia Platanou Παραλία Πλατάνου
- Community
- Location within Greece
- Coordinates: 38°10′16″N 22°16′23″E
- Country: Greece
- Administrative region: West Greece
- Regional unit: Achaea
- Municipality: Aigialeia
- Municipal unit: Akrata
- Elevation: 10 m (33 ft)

Population (2021)
  - Community: 216
- Time zone: UTC+2 (EET)
  - Summer (DST): UTC+3 (EEST)

Paralia Platanou (Greek: Παραλία Πλατάνου, English: "Platanos beach"), is a village and a community of the municipality Aigialeia, southwestern Greece. It is situated on the seashore of the Gulf of Corinth below Platanos village. The entrance to the village is found a short distance beyond Kryoneri Bay, on the 155th km (97th mile) of the Old National Corinth-Patras Road at a designated exit. It is served by Platanos railway station on the line from Kiato to Aigio.

Noted beaches are Avgolemono (153rd km/98th mile), Liontari (160th km/100th mile), and the neighbouring Punta Beach, below Trapeza village.

Platanos is famous for its natural Artesian spring water, and for Λιοντάρι (Liontari, i.e. a natural, house-sized rocky formation in the shape of a lion at the western end of the village on the edge of a mountain slope.
