= Platanos, Achaea =

Platanos Πλάτανος
- Community
- Location within Greece
- Coordinates: 38°09′53″N 22°15′54″E
- Country: Greece
- Administrative region: West Greece
- Regional unit: Achaea
- Municipality: Aigialeia
- Municipal unit: Akrata
- Elevation: 273 m (896 ft)

Population (2021)
  - Community: 201
- Time zone: UTC+2 (EET)
  - Summer (DST): UTC+3 (EEST)

Platanos (Greek: Πλάτανος) is a village and a community in the municipal unit of Akrata, Achaea, Greece. The community includes the mountain villages Ano Potamia, Korinthiako Balkoni and Tsivlos. Platanos lies at about 270 m elevation on a mountain slope directly above the seaside village Paralia Platanou. The villages Ano Potamia and Tsivlos are about 10 km south of Platanos. Platanos is 5 km west of Akrata and 18 km southeast of Aigio. The Greek National Road 8A (Athens - Corinth - Patras) and the railway Corinth - Patras pass north of Platanos.

== Population ==
| Year | Village population | Community population |
|---|---|---|
| 1981 | 359 | - |
| 1991 | 396 | - |
| 2001 | 408 | 530 |
| 2011 | 231 | 259 |
| 2021 | 196 | 201 |

== See also ==
- List of settlements in Achaea
