= Aegae (Achaea) =

Town and polis (city-state) of ancient Achaea

Coordinates: 38°9′20″N 22°18′43″E

Map of Ancient Achaea

Aegae or Aigai (Ancient Greek: Αἰγαί), also known as Aega or Aiga (Αἰγά), was a town and polis (city-state) of ancient Achaea, and one of the 12 Achaean cities. It was situated upon the river Crathis and upon the coast, between Aegeira and Bura.

One of the mentions of Aegae in Homer's Iliad points to this town. (Note: The other mention of Aegae, in Homer, Iliad, 13.21, points to Aegae (Euboea).)

It was afterwards deserted by its inhabitants, who removed to the neighbouring town of Aegeira; and it had already ceased to be one of the 12 Achaean cities on the renewal of the Achaean League in 280 BCE, its place being occupied by Ceryneia. Its name does not occur in Polybius. Neither Strabo nor Pausanias mention on which bank of the Crathis it stood, but it probably stood on the left bank, since the right is low and often inundated.

Its site is located near the modern Akrata. The location of the ancient city has been excavated.
