= Hubur =

Sumerian term; usually the "river of the netherworld"

Hubur (𒄷𒁓, Hu-bur) is a Sumerian term meaning "river", "watercourse" or "netherworld." It is usually the "river of the netherworld".

== Usage and meaning ==
A connection to Tiamat has been suggested with parallels to her description as "Ummu-Hubur". Hubur is also referred to in the Enuma Elish as "mother sea Hubur, who fashions all things". The river Euphrates has been identified with Hubur as the source of fertility in Sumer. This Babylonian "river of creation" has been linked to the Hebrew "river of paradise". Gunkel and Zimmern suggested resemblance in expressions and a possible connection between the Sumerian river and that found in later literary tradition in the Book of Ezekiel (Ezekiel 47) likely influencing imagery of the "River of Water of Life" in the Apocalypse (KJV). They also noted a connection between the "Water of Life" in the legend of Adapa and a myth translated by A.H. Sayce called "An address to the river of creation".

Delitzch has suggested the similar Sumerian word Habur probably meant "mighty water source", "source of fertility" or the like. This has suggested the meaning of Hubur to be "river of fertility in the underworld". Linda Foubister has suggested the river of creation was linked with the importance of rivers and rain in the Fertile Crescent and suggested it was related to the underworld as rivers resemble snakes. Samuel Eugene Balentine suggested that the "pit" (sahar) and "river" or "channel" (salah) in the Book of Job (Job 33:18) were referencing the Hubur. The god Marduk was praised for restoration or saving individuals from death when he drew them out of the waters of the Hubur, a later reference to this theme is made in Psalm 18 (HE).

== Mythology ==
The river plays a certain role in Mesopotamian mythology and Assyro-Babylonian religion, associated with the Sumerian paradise and heroes and deities such as Gilgamesh, Enlil, Enki and Ninlil. The Hubur was suggested to be between the twin peaks of Mount Mashu to the east in front of the gates of the netherworld. The Sumerian myth of Enlil and Ninlil tells the tale of the leader of the gods, Enlil being banished to the netherworld followed by his wife Ninlil. It mentions the river and its ferryman, Urshanabi, who crosses the river in a boat. Themes of this story are repeated later in the Epic of Gilgamesh where the ferryman is called Urshanabi. In later Assyrian times, the ferryman became a monster called Hamar-tabal and may have influenced the later Charon of Greek mythology. In another story, a four-handed bird demon carries souls across to the city of the dead. Several Akkadian demons are also restrained by the river Hubur. The river is mentioned in the Inscription of Ilum-Ishar, written on bricks at Mari. Nergal, god of the netherworld is referred to as "king Hubur" in a list of Sumerian gods. The word is also used into the Assyrian empire where it was used as the name of the tenth month in a calendar dated to around 1100 BC. There was also a goddess called Haburitim mentioned in texts from the Third dynasty of Ur.

== Cosmology and geography ==
In Sumerian cosmology, the souls of the dead had to travel across the desert or steppe, cross the Hubur river, to the mountainland of Kur. Here the souls had to pass through seven different walled and gated locations to reach the netherworld. The Anunnaki administered Kur as if it were a civilized settlement both architecturally and politically.

Frans Wiggermann connected Hubur to the Habur, a tributary of the Euphrates far away from the Sumerian heartland, there was also a town called Haburatum east of the Tigris. He suggested that as the concept of the netherworld (as opposed to an underworld) in Sumerian cosmogeny lacked the modern concept of an accompanying divine ruler of a location underneath the earth, the geographical terminology suggested that it was located at the edges of the world and that its features derived in part from real geography before shifting to become a demonic fantasy world.

== Modern literature ==
In Neil Gaiman’s American Gods, Hubur appears in Chapter Three, during Shadow's (the main character) dream of forgotten gods. Gaiman's Hubur is described as a "broad-hipped woman with monsters dropping from the vast gash between her legs".^{[12]}

== See also ==
- Hitfun - Mandaeism
- Gjöll - Norse mythology
- Sanzu River - Japanese Buddhism
- Styx - Greek mythology
- Vaitarna River (mythological) - Hinduism and Buddhism
- The Voyage of Life
- Manunggul Jar - early depiction on burial jar from Tabon Caves on Palawan of boatman paddling across river
