= Urshanabi =

Character in the Epic of Gilgamesh

Urshanabi, also known as Sursunabu, was a figure in Mesopotamian mythology. His name is considered unusual and difficult to interpret, and consists of a prefix common in Sumerian names and a cuneiform numeral which could be read as either 2/3 or 40. Most likely it was an artificial scholarly construction. He is known from the Old Babylonian and Standard Babylonian versions of the Epic of Gilgamesh, as well as from its Hittite adaptation. He is described as a boatman in the service of the flood hero Utnapishtim, and is responsible for taking Gilgamesh to Utnapishtim's domain. In the Standard Babylonian version, he also subsequently travels with him back to Uruk. It has additionally been proposed that he might have been viewed as a survivor of the great flood, and that he acted as a ferryman of the dead comparable to Ḫumuṭ-tabal or Greek Charon.

== Name ==
The name Urshanabi was typically written as ^{m}ur-šanabi in cuneiform, šanabi being the reading of the numeral designating 40 and due to Mesopotamian mathematics relying on a sexagesimal system also 2/3 (𒐏). In most cases it is preceded with a determinative designating personal names, and a single attestation of a dingir, the “divine determinative” designating theonyms taking its place is presumed to be a scribal mistake. The first element, ur-, is common in Sumerian personal names and can be translated as “servant”. Following the pattern established by other structurally similar names, the second should be either a theonym, or the name of an object or location regarded as a numen. The fact that it is a numeral instead is unusual, and most likely indicates the name was coined artificially. Gary Beckman notes this might have been the result of renewed interest in Sumerian language in the second half of the second millennium BCE. Sebastian Fink points out that Urshanabi’s name might have been purposely mysterious and unusual to give the ancient readers multiple possibilities of interpreting it.

A bilingual list of personal names explains Urshanabi in Akkadian as Amēl-Ea, “man of Ea”, relying on the use of the numeral 40 to represent this god, but according to Andrew R. George Urshanabi is to be understood as an artificial translation of an originally Akkadian name into Sumerian in this context. The convention of using numerals to represent names of deities is best attested from the Middle Assyrian period, though older examples have been noted. Sebastian Fink has instead suggested that due to the numeral in his name also designating 2/3 , Urshanabi’s name might be an allusion to Gilgamesh’s status as one third human and two thirds god. On this basis, he proposes the literal translation “servant of two thirds”, which he interprets as an allusion to his status as Gilgamesh’s helper in the story due to analogy with names of other side characters in the Epic of Gilgamesh which also hint at their roles. George has subsequently accepted this proposal as another plausible explanation. However, Beckman considers all of the proposed translations to be difficult to accept.

In an Old Babylonian fragment of an early version of the Epic of Gilgamesh, possibly from Sippar, Urshanabi is instead named Sursunabu, but in later versions this name no longer appears, and its origin is uncertain. In the past it was assumed that the element ur- was read as sur-, with the two names of this figure being used as evidence, but this theory is no longer accepted today. However, it is not impossible the older form is a corruption of the one attested in later sources.

== Role in the Epic of Gilgamesh ==
Urshanabi is attested in the “Standard Babylonian” edition of the Epic of Gilgamesh, as well as in a single Old Babylonian fragment and the Hittite adaptation, but he is absent from the surviving sections of all the other variants, including the Middle Babylonian epic, the Akkadian fragments from Hattusa, and the Hurrian adaptation. He is described as a boatman in the service of Utanapishtim. His boat is described as a magillu, which based on other literary texts had ocean-going capability and was suitable for long voyages. He is responsible for transporting those willing to traverse the cosmic ocean separating the end of the world from the realm of his master. In the final section of the epic, he accompanies Gilgamesh back to Uruk.

In the Standard Babylonian epic, Urshanabi is first mentioned by Shiduri when she explains to Gilgamesh how to reach Utanapishtim. She tells him that he can be found in a forest, where he is gathering wood. Gilgamesh rushes there, armed with an axe and a dirk, and after encountering Urshanabi fights him and smashes the “Stone Ones” accompanying him. The nature of the “Stone Ones” (šūt abni) is uncertain, and they have been variously interpreted as rudder oars, gunwales, punting poles, sails, anchor stones, kedges, talismans or anthropomorphic beings. The Hittite edition of the epic presents them as a pair of statues acting as Urshanabi’s crew and, according to Andrew R. George, the same can be presumed for the Mesopotamian original. Anne Draffkorn Kilmer attempted to reconcile the assumption that they were a part of the vessel with their description as supernatural statues by proposing that they might have been a type of anchor stones known from various archeological sites on the Mediterranean coast which, in addition to their nautical use, could also serve as votive objects.

After a lacuna, Urshanabi asks Gilgamesh about his poor state, and in response hears the story of Enkidu’s death and realization of own mortality which followed it. This section has been compared to similar recounting of Gilgamesh’s deeds during his lament for Enkidu and during his meetings with Siduri and Utnapishitim. Repetition of specific passages during his encounters with other characters was a part of a process of homogenization meant to bridge together elements originating in originally distinct narratives into a singular epic poem.

Gilgamesh subsequently demands to be taken to Utanapishtim, but Urshanabi informs him that since he smashed the “Stone Ones” the journey will be more difficult, and to solve the problem Gilgamesh needs to cut 300 poles to punt the boat, which he promptly does. He and Urshanabi then set sail. As the boat has no additional crew, they have to steer it themselves. Each of the punting poles can only be used once, as it is the only way to guarantee Gilgamesh will not directly touch the potentially dangerous water. They eventually run out of them, but Gilgamesh makes a sail out of Urshanabi’s clothes and after three days they reach their destination. It is possible that this section of the epic had an etiological purpose, serving as the explanation of the origin of sails. The scene of the boat’s landing is not fully preserved, but the surviving fragments indicate Utnapishtim was already waiting on the shore, and he acts surprised that Urshanabi is accompanied by a crewman he does not recognize.

Since the initial encounter between Urshanabi and Gilgamesh is described on tablet X of the standard late edition of the epic, the Old Babylonian fragment preserving the same episode is sometimes referred to as tablet X of the corresponding edition, but according to George this label should be avoided, as it is unknown how many tablets the older version of the epic had. The latter lacks a counterpart of the passage in which Gilgamesh recounts his deeds to the boatman. The colophon of the Hittite version indicates that the meeting with Urshanabi was placed on the third tablet in this edition.

Urshanabi appears again on tablet XI, after Gilgamesh fails to fulfill Utnapishtim’s request to remain awake for a week. Utnapishtim curses him, presumably because he brought Gilgamesh to his home, and relieves him of his duties, possibly so that no mortal can reach the shore of his domain ever again. Urshanabi then waits on the shore while Gilgamesh attempts to obtain the plant of life in the depths. When the hero returns, he informs him that he successfully obtained it, and that he will find out if it possesses the rejuvenating power attributed to it once he is back in Uruk. They embark together, but after they reach the shore, the plant is devoured by a snake, prompting Gilgamesh to fall into despair and tell Urshanabi all of his adventures were pointless. The epic then concludes with Gilgamesh and Urshanabi returning to Uruk and Gilgamesh suggesting that Urshanabi should try climbing the city walls:

Go up, Ur-šanabi, on to the wall of Uruk and walk around,
survey the foundation platform, inspect the brickwork!
(See) if its brickwork is not kiln-fired brick,
and if the Seven Sages did not lay its foundations!
One šār is city, one šār date-grove, one šār is clay-pit, half a šār the temple of Ištar:
three šār and a half (is) Uruk, (its) measurement.

It constitutes a repetition of a part of the first tablet of the epic, which similarly described Uruk, its walls, and important locations within it. It is commonly assumed that this passage's purpose is to show that Gilgamesh accepted that the wall that he built around the city will remain his legacy, but according to George it might be more broadly inviting the reader to contemplate the nature of then-contemporary society and its achievements, exemplified by the city of Uruk. According to his interpretation, Urshanabi here effectively functions as a stand-in for the audience.

== Proposed relevance outside the epic ==
Following Berossus’ account of the flood, in which the hero Xisuthros and his family were accompanied by a pilot on their ship, Andrew R. George proposes that Urshanabi might be a figure from the older version of the same tradition, and similarly was believed to be one of the protagonists of a flood myth.

Since a part of the ocean separating the domain of Utnapishtim from the world is described as the “waters of death”, George also suggests that it is not impossible that Urshanabi was additionally believed to act as the ferryman of the dead, comparable to Greek Charon. Daniel Schwemer has also voiced support for this hypothesis. However, both authors acknowledge this role is elsewhere directly attested for the underworld being Ḫumuṭ-tabal (“carry off quickly”). Additionally, in a number of incantations Gilgamesh is addressed as a ferryman of the dead responsible for transporting them through the river Hubur.
