= Sanzu River =

Mythological river in Japanese Buddhist tradition

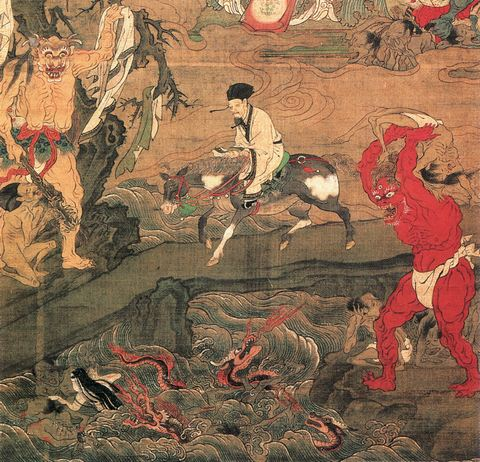
A depiction of the Sanzu River in Tosa Mitsunobu's Jūō-zu (十王図). The good can cross the river by a bridge while the evil are cast into the dragon-infested rapids.

The Sanzu-no-Kawa (三途の川; "Sanzu River", literally the "Three-World River" in reference to Buddhist ideas about realms of existence) is a mythological river in Japanese Buddhist tradition similar to the Chinese concept of Huang Quan (Yellow Springs), Indian concept of the Vaitarani and Greek concept of the Styx.

Before reaching the afterlife, the souls of the deceased must cross the river by one of three crossing points: a bridge, a ford, or a stretch of deep, snake-infested waters. The weight of one's offenses while alive determines which path an individual must take. It is believed that a toll of six mon must be paid before a soul can cross the river, a belief reflected in Japanese funerals when the necessary fee is placed in the casket with the dead.

The Sanzu River is popularly believed to be in Mount Osore, a suitably desolate and remote part of Aomori Prefecture in northern Japan.

Similarly to the Sanzu-no-Kawa, there is also the Sai no Kawara (賽の河原; "River-plain of the Dead"), a boundary by which the souls of children who died too early cross over to the realm of the Dead, with the help of Jizō-bosatsu (Bodhisattva Jizō) who helps the souls of children who died too early to avoid the attentions of the Oni. In the Sai-no-kawara, it is said that there is Datsueba (alias Shozuka-no-Baba) who is an old woman, stripping clothes of the dead.

== Real Sanzu Rivers in Japan ==
Map
1. in Mutsu, Aomori 41°19′33″N 141°05′46″E (drains from Usori Lake)
2. in Zaō, Miyagi 38°08′39″N 140°29′29″E (confluence with Nigori River)
3. in Kanra, Gunma 36°15′31″N 138°57′09″E (confluence with Shirakura River)
4. in Chōnan, Chiba 35°25′22″N 140°15′54″E (confluence with Ichinomiya River)

== See also ==
- Yomotsu Hirasaka
- Yomi
  - Yama
  - Yama (Buddhism)
  - Naraka
  - Ne-no-kuni
  - Meido
- Higan (彼岸, "The Other Shore") - The other side of the Sanzu River, opposite the Living World's side.
- Bardo - Buddhist mythology
- Gjöll – Norse mythology
- Hitfun - Mandaeism
- Hubur – Mesopotamian mythology
- Styx – Greek mythology
- Vaitarna River (mythological) – Indian religions
- Naihe Bridge - the entrance and exit to the underworld in Taoism and Chinese folk beliefs; the ghosts must pass over this bridge before they can be reincarnated.
