= Sylivainiotika =

Sylivainiotika Συλιβαινιώτικα
- Community
- Location within Greece
- Coordinates: 38°10′N 22°20′E
- Country: Greece
- Administrative region: West Greece
- Regional unit: Achaea
- Municipality: Aigialeia
- Municipal unit: Akrata

Population (2021)
  - Community: 958
- Time zone: UTC+2 (EET)
  - Summer (DST): UTC+3 (EEST)

Sylivainiotika (Greek: Συλιβαινιώτικα) is a village in Achaea, Greece, near the town of Akrata.

Recent archaeological discoveries have revealed a civilization in the village even in the middle Neolithic era. A painted fruit stand was discovered in the region during the 6th millennium BC. This finding is exhibited in the Archaeological Museum of Aigio (about 35 km west of Sylivainiotika on the highway from Athens to Patras). More recent findings include a three handled amphorae and a necklace both made in about the 15th century BC.
