= Vaitarani (mythology) =

River of hell in Hinduism

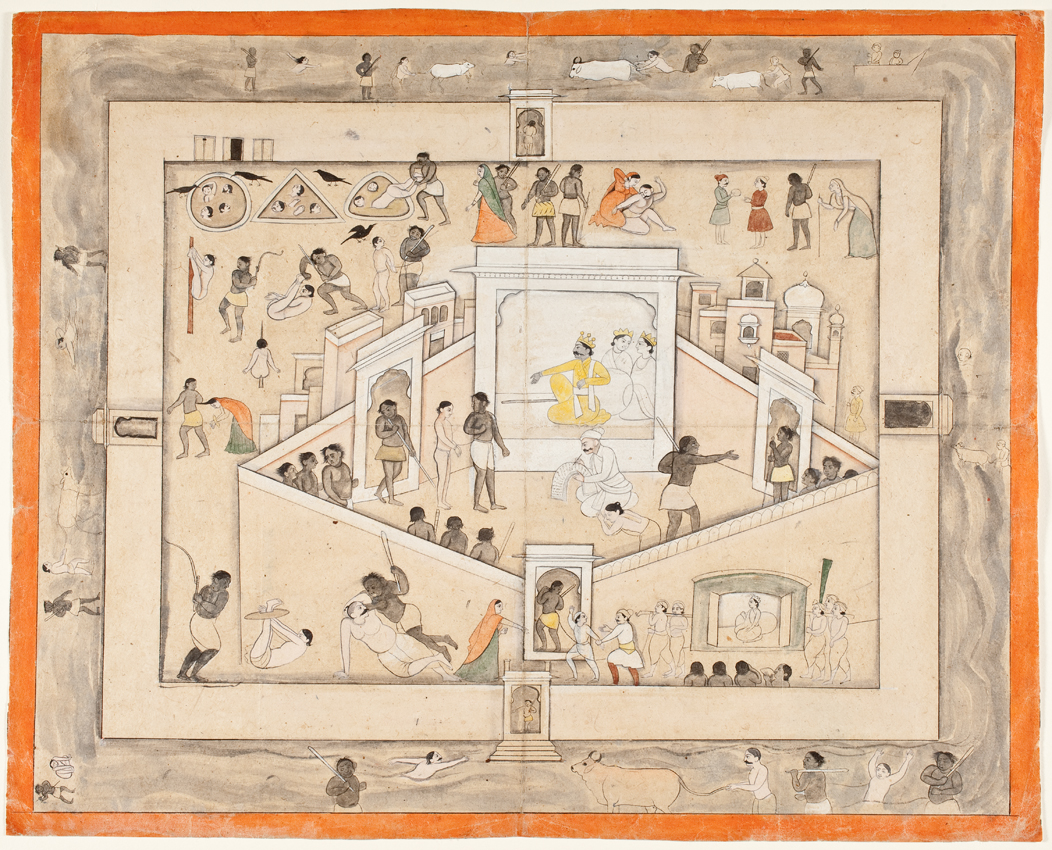
The river is depicted along the outer edges of the castle walls.

The Vaitarani (Sanskrit: वैतरणी, romanized: Vaitaraṇī), also called the Vaitarana, is a river in Indian religions. Described in the Garuda Purana and various other Hindu religious texts, the Vaitarani lies between the Earth and the infernal Naraka, the realm of Yama, the Hindu god of death. It is believed to be capable of purifying sins. The righteous are stated to see the river filled with nectar-like water, while the sinful see it filled with blood. The Vaitarani is similar to the Styx river in Greek mythology.

It is associated with the Vaitarani Vrata, observed on the eleventh day of the dark phase of the moon; the Krishna Paksha of Margashirsha in the Hindu calendar, wherein a cow is worshiped and donated, which is believed to take one across the dreaded river as mentioned in the Garuda Purana, verses 77–82.

== Hinduism ==
=== Puranas ===
The Garuda Purana states that the Vaitarani extends for over a hundred yojanas. It is stated to be filled with water and blood, and abounds with vultures and fish. The psychopomps of the river ferry travellers across the river for a nominal fee. Offering a cow that a deceased individual is gifted during his time of death, called the Vaitarani cow, allows him to be rowed across the river.

The Harihareshvara Mahatmya of the Skanda Purana mentions a physical river comprising the Vaitarani that joins in the eastern ocean; he who bathes in it is supposed to forever be free from the torment of Yama.

Vaitarani appears in the Matsya Purana, the Vamana Purana, and the Padma Purana, which reveals the etymology of Vaitarani in the Vaitarani Mahatmya, where it is defined as Vai (truly) tarini (saving). It is related the legend wherein the river was brought on to the earth from Patala, due to the penance of Parashurama after receiving a boon from Shiva.

The Agni Purana states that one should state the following words while offering a gift to an individual on the brink of death:

There is the dark Vaitarani river at the dreadful entrance to (the place of) the God of Death. I am giving this black cow in order to cross that Vaitarani.

— Agni Purana, Chapter 210

The Devi Bhagavatam states that the river is frightening to sinners.

=== Ramayana ===
The Ramayana describes Ravana traversing the bloody Vaitarani on his pushpaka vimana.

=== Mahabharata ===
The Mahabharata states that the Vaitarani is capable of destroying every sin. It states that the creatures that fall into the Vaitarani experience foul-smelling fluids such as blood, water, phlegm, urine, and faeces.

== Sikhism ==
The Vaitarani River (Gurmukhi: ਵੈਤਰਨੀ ) is a river that comes on the way to Yama's court after a person dies. The Vaitarani river is also believed to exist by the Hindus. This River is a river full of blood, pus, urine and other filthy things. This river has a very bad smell to it due to it being a river full of filth. In the river are fierce flesh eating birds, fish, insects, crocodiles and other fierce animals that attack the being. This river has fire on top of it and is set on fire and this river's content is extremely hot.

This river was made especially for the sinners. The sinners burn in this river, and have their flesh torn by the insects and animals as they are made to swim across this river and those who done good deeds are given a boat to cross this river in one piece.

== Buddhism ==
The Vaitaraṇī Nadī (Sanskrit; Pali: Vetaraṇī Nadī), also known as the Kṣārodaka Nadī (Pali: Khārodakā Nadī) or Kṣāra Nadī (lit. caustic river) is recognized in Buddhism as a river that flows through the hell realm. In East Asia it is known as 灰河地獄 (Chinese: Huīhé dìyù; Japanese: Haiga Jigoku; Korean: 회하지옥, Hoeha-jiok; Vietnamese: Hôi hà địa ngục; lit. Ash river hell) or transliterated as 鞞多梨尼河 (Chinese: Bǐngduōlíní-hé; Japanese: Baitarini-kawa).

In Pali literature, the river is described as flowing by the forest of sword-leaves Asipattavana. Beings in hell attempt to bathe and drink from it, only to discover that swords and sharp weapons lie concealed beneath its waters. Creepers that bear thorns like spears grow on its banks. Its residents are those who are guilty of abortion and oppressing the weak. In the Nimi Jātaka, (No. 541) the righteous king Nimi was given a tour of the cosmos by Mātali, during which he caught glimpse of the Vetaraṇī in hell.

In Mahāyāna sources such as the Mahāprajñāpāramitāśāstra, the Vaitaraṇī is one of the minor hells (utsada) within the realm of Avīci. Sinners who enter the river are swept downstream to a ground of burning iron. The name also refers to the forest of iron spines that runs along its banks, forming one of the sixteen minor hells situated outside the eight great hells. Rebirth here is the result of killing marine life such as fish or turtles, pushing others to fall into the water, or throwing them into either boiling or freezing water.

== See also ==
- Garuda Purana
- Yama
- Sin
- Dattatreya
- Gjöll – Norse mythology
- Hitfun – Mandaeism
- Hubur – Mesopotamian mythology
- Sanzu River – Japanese Buddhism
- Styx – Greek mythology

== Sources ==
- The Garuda Purana, tr. by Ernest Wood, S. V. Subrahmanyam. BiblioBazaar, LLC. 2008. ISBN 978-1-4375-3213-5.
- "Siddhabodh" by Gagangiri Maharaj. Gagangad publications. 1998.(Marathi)
- Kalayaan (Year 43) Parlok Aur Punarjanma (World of the Dead and Reincarnation), Gita Press, Gorakhpur. (Hindi)
- Spiritual Science Research Foundation – articles on Martyalok
