= Peristera, Achaea =

Peristera Περιστέρα
- Community
- Location within Greece
- Coordinates: 38°01′N 22°14′E
- Country: Greece
- Administrative region: West Greece
- Regional unit: Achaea
- Municipality: Aigialeia
- Municipal unit: Akrata

Population (2021)
  - Community: 62
- Time zone: UTC+2 (EET)
  - Summer (DST): UTC+3 (EEST)

Peristera (Greek: Περιστέρα for "pigeons") is a small mountain village and a community, part of the municipal unit of Akrata, Achaea, Greece. It is located at the foot of the mountain Chelmos or Aroania, at an altitude of about 1,200 m. Peristera is connected by road north to Akrata. Mesorrougi is 1 km to the south, and Akrata is 16 km to the northeast. The community includes the villages Agridi and Chalkianika.

== Historical population ==
Year	Population village	Population community
1981	101	-
1991	117	-
2001	260	331
2011	76	86
2021	49	62

== See also ==
- List of settlements in Achaea
