= Mesorrougi =

Mesorrougi Μεσορρούγι
- Community
- Location within Greece
- Coordinates: 38°01′N 22°15′E
- Country: Greece
- Administrative region: West Greece
- Regional unit: Achaea
- Municipality: Aigialeia
- Municipal unit: Akrata

Population (2021)
  - Community: 28
- Time zone: UTC+2 (EET)
  - Summer (DST): UTC+3 (EEST)

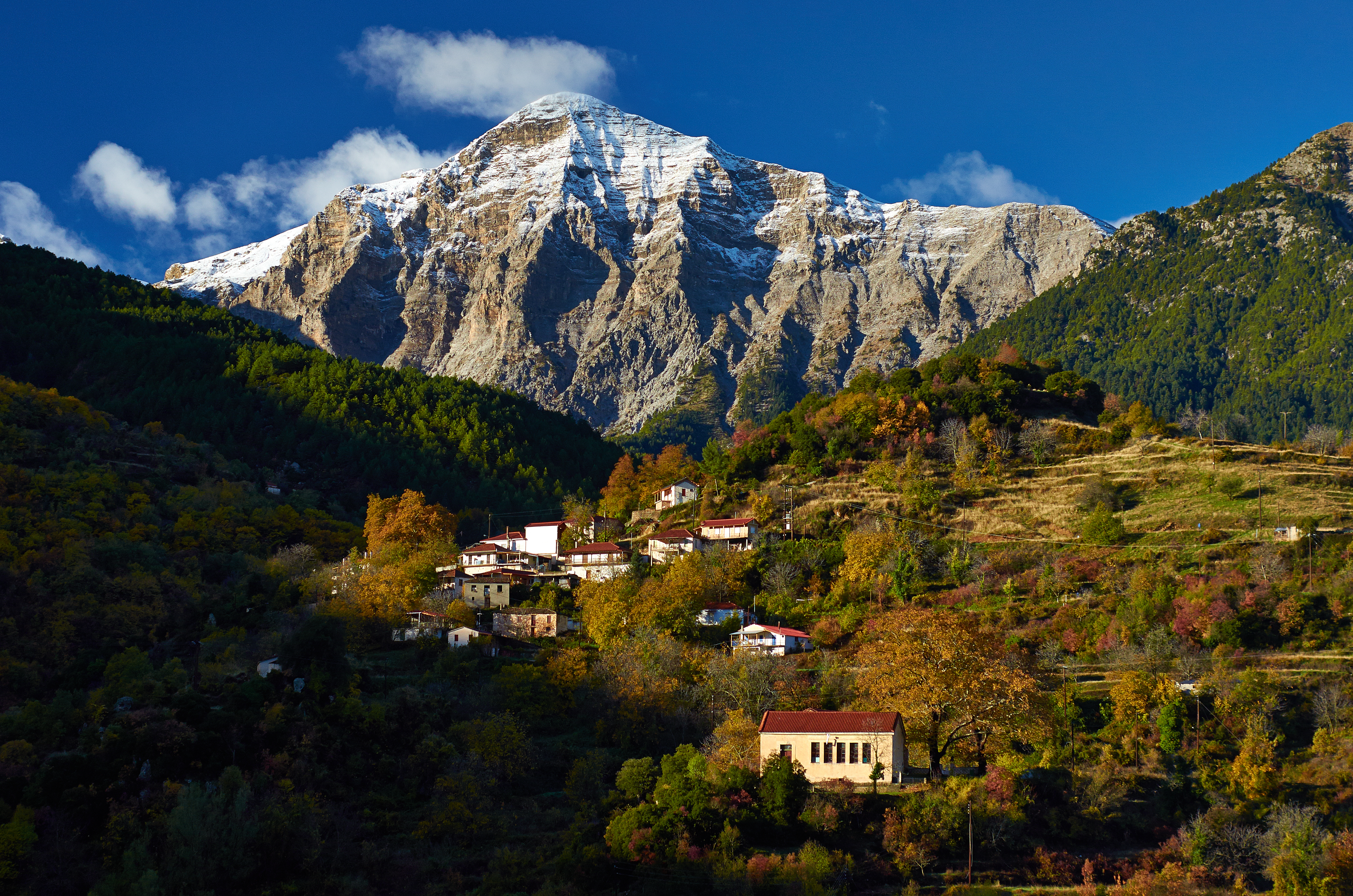
Mesorrougi village on the slopes of Chelmos Mountain

Mesorrougi (Greek: Μεσορρούγι) is a small village and a community in the municipal unit of Akrata, Achaea, Greece. It is built on the forested slopes of Mount Chelmos (Aroania). The community consists of the villages Mesorrougi, Ano Mesorrougi and Solos. It is 1 km south of Peristera, 12 km east of Kalavryta and 17 km southwest of Akrata. Until 1912, Mesorrougi constituted a part of the municipality of Nonakrida.

== Population ==
Year	Population village	Community population
1981	66	-
1991	51	-
2001	118	279
2011	23	62
2021	15	28

== See also ==
- List of settlements in Achaea
