= Akrata =

Town in Achaea, Greece

Akrata Ακράτα
- Municipal unit
- Location within the regional unit

- Location within Greece
- Coordinates: 38°10′N 22°19′E
- Country: Greece
- Administrative region: West Greece
- Regional unit: Achaea
- Municipality: Aigialeia

Area
  - Municipal unit: 180.17 km^{2} (69.56 sq mi)
- Elevation: 140 m (460 ft)

Population (2021)
  - Municipal unit: 4,247
  - Municipal unit density: 23.57/km^{2} (61.05/sq mi)
  - Community: 1,377
- Time zone: UTC+2 (EET)
  - Summer (DST): UTC+3 (EEST)
- Postal code: 250 06
- Area code: 26960
- Vehicle registration: ΑΧ

Akrata (Greek: Ακράτα) is a town and a former municipality in Achaea, West Greece, Greece. Since the 2011 local government reform it is part of the municipality Aigialeia, of which it is a municipal unit. The municipal unit has an area of 180.169 km^{2}. Akrata is located on the right bank of the river Krathis, 3 km from its outflow into the Gulf of Corinth. The Greek National Road 8A/E65 (Patras - Corinth) and the railway from Patras to Corinth pass through the municipal unit, northeast of the town. The nearest town is Aigeira, 4 km to the east. It is 23 km southeast of Aigio, 52 km east of Patras and 23 km northeast of Kalavryta.

== Subdivisions ==
The municipal unit Akrata is subdivided into the following communities (constituent villages in brackets):

- Agia Varvara (Agia Varvara, Vounaki)
- Akrata (Akrata, Palaiostafida, Pyrgos, Fournoi)
- Ampelos
- Kalamias (Kalamias, Kato Potamia, Potamitikos Gialos)
- Krathio (Krathio, Goumaiika)
- Mesorrougi (Mesorrougi, Ano Mesorrougi, Solos)
- Paralia Platanou
- Peristera (Peristera, Agridi, Chalkianika)
- Platanos (Platanos, Ano Potamia, Korinthiako Balkoni, Tsivlos)
- Porovitsa (Porovitsa, Paralia Porovitsis)
- Sylivainiotika
- Valimi
- Voutsimos
- Zarouchla

== Historical population ==
Year	Village population	Community Population	Municipal unit population
1991	1,508	-	5,492
2001	1,737	1,778	6,871
2011	1,393	1,429	4,747
2021	1,329	1,377	4,247

== Geography ==
Most of the municipal unit is mountainous, with only some flat areas near the Gulf of Corinth coast. Akrata is known for its beaches. The river Krathis flows from the Aroania mountain to sea through Akrata. Lake Tsivlos, formed by a landslide in 1912, is by the road linking Akrata and Zarouchla, 11 km southwest of Akrata.

== History ==
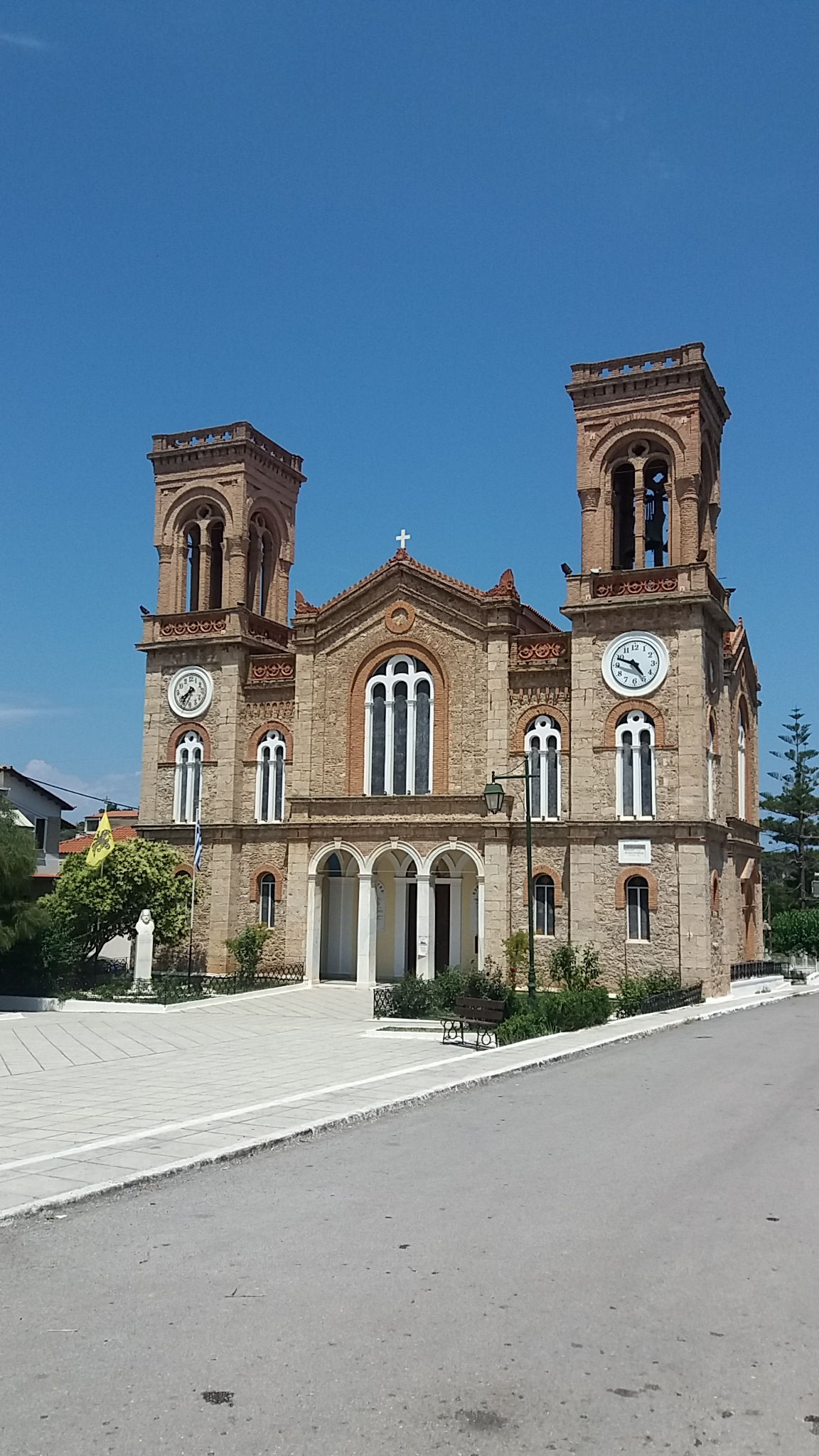
Saint Charalampos church

The ruins of the ancient city of Aegae and its ancient theatre are found near Akrata. The municipality Akrata was founded in 1879 but was dissolved in 1914. The municipality was refounded in 1986 along with Sylivainiotika, Porovitsa and Krathio. In 1998 under the Capodistrian Plan, the municipality was enlarged to include every village and town in the municipality. Angelos Deloukas was the first mayor of the municipality. The countryside near Akrata was damaged by the 2007 Greek forest fires.

== Media and books ==
- Styx - Greek local and monthly newspaper

== Sources ==
- Anastasios M. Georgantopoulos, Foundation and evolution of Akrata (Ίδρυση και Εξέλιξη της Ακράτας)
- Anastasios Georgantopoulos, Akrata in the last decade of 20th century (Η Ακράτα στην τελευταία 10ετία του 20ου αιώνα)
- Athanasios Fotopoulos, Historic And Demographics Of The Eastern Area of Aigialeia And Kalavryta, (Ιστορικά και Λαογραφικά της Ανατολικής Αιγιάλειας και Καλαβρύτων), Athens, 1982 (in Greek)
