= Krathis =

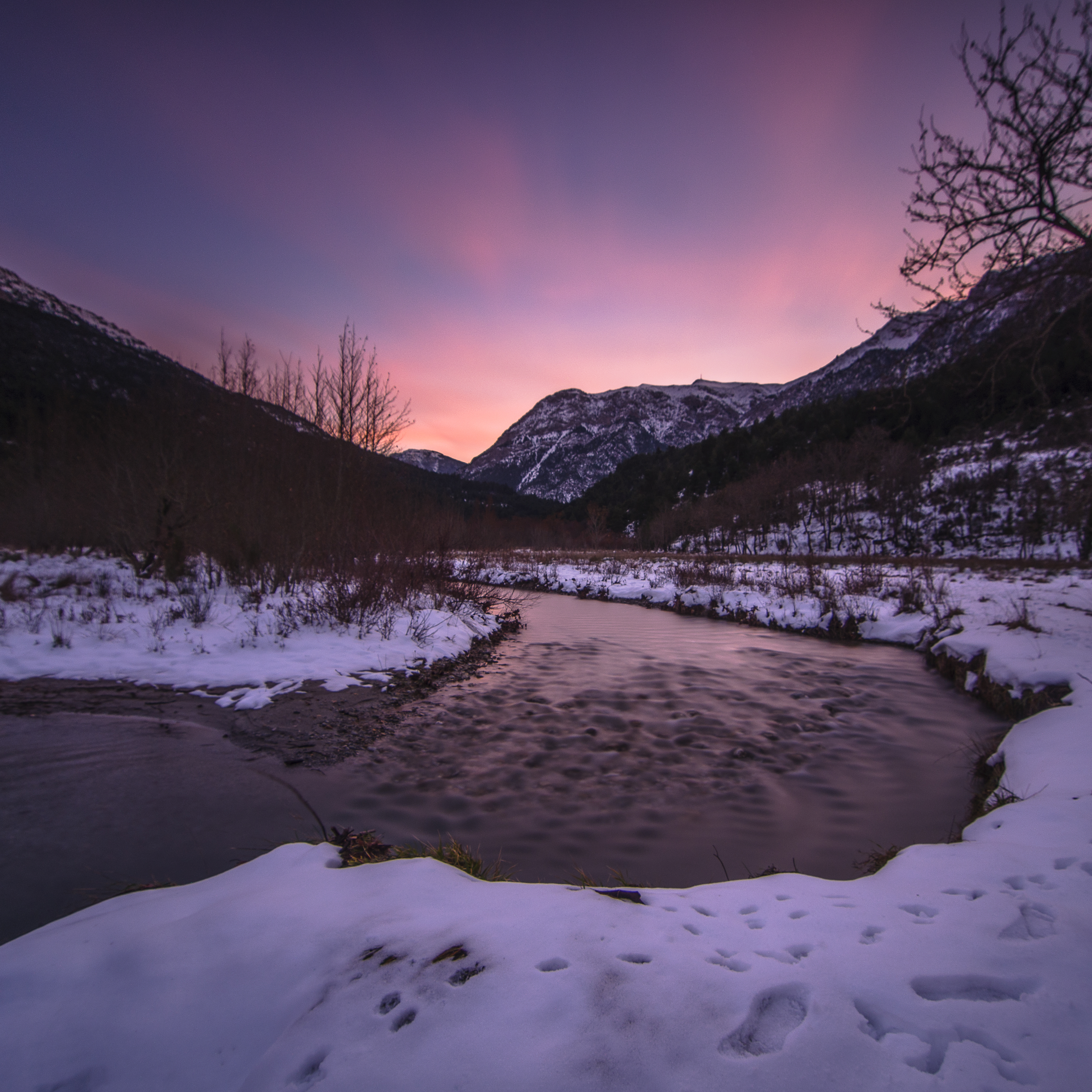
- Native name: Κράθις (Greek)

Location
- Country: Greece
- Region: Achaea

Physical characteristics
- Source
  - location: Chelmos
- Mouth
  - location: Gulf of Corinth
  - coordinates: 38.1728°N 22.3396°E
- Length: 32.6 km (20.3 mi)

The Krathis (Greek: Κράθις, Latin: Crathis) is a river in the eastern part of Achaea, southern Greece. The river flows through the municipal unit of Akrata. It is 32.6 km (20.3 mi) long.

== Geography ==
The river's course is from the south to the north. It begins in the northern part of the Chelmos mountains and flows through a deep valley. It passes the village Tsivlos and the town Akrata. The river empties into the Gulf of Corinth near Akrata.

== History ==
In ancient times the river's course was close to Achaean Aegae and had two tributaries according to Strabo. The river received its name because it was a mixture. Pausanias and Herodotus also mention it, stating that the river Crathis in Bruttium was named after it.
