= List of caves in Greece =

This article show a list of caves in Greece.

== Deepest caves in Greece ==
The deepest caves in Greece in order of depth are:

- Cave of the Lion, Trou de Leon (in French) in the Lefka Ori mountains, Crete. Explored depth −1,110m (2008) ending in a sump but exploration of leads is ongoing.
- Gourgouthakas in the Lefka Ori mountains, Crete. Explored depth −1,100m (2022) ending in a sump with some unexplored leads.
- Tafkoura in Mount Psiloritis / Mount Ida, Crete. Explored depth −860m (1996) ending in a sump and with many unexplored leads.
- Sternes in the Lefka Ori mountains, Crete. Explored depth −722m and length 7,750m (2024) with many unexplored leads.

== Other caves in Greece ==
- The Acropolis cave complex in Athens, Prefecture of Attica includes:
  - an Asclepieion on the northwest slope
  - the Cave of Auglaros
  - The Mycenean Cavern, an abandoned Mycenean well on the northwest slope
- Agalaki Cave, southwest of Sami, near Poulata in Kefalonia Isl, Prefecture of Kefalonia
- Aghios Ioannis-Kastro, Skopelos Isl, Prefecture of Magnesia
- Agios Georgios Cave – in the city of Kilkis, Prefecture of Kilkis
- Alepotrypa or Alepotripa – near Pramanda, Prefecture of Ioannina
- Alistrati's Caves
- Angitis – Maara, Prefecture of Drama
- Apidima Cave – western shore of Mani Peninsula
- Archantropon of the Red Stone Cave – near Petralona, Prefecture of Chalkidiki
- Asprochaliko Cave – in the city of Philippiada, Prefecture of Preveza
- Bekiris, Spetses Isl. Prefecture of Piraeus
- Blue Cave – in the island of Kastelorizo, Prefecture of Dodecanese
- Cave of Aghios Ioannis, Heraklia Isl, Prefecture of Cyclades
- Cave of Ellenokamara – near Aghia Marina, Kasos Isl, Prefecture of Dodecanese
- Cave of Harkadio, Messaria Castle, Telos Isl, Prefecture of Dodecanese
- Cave of the Lakes or cave of the Nymphs – near Kalavryta, Prefecture of Achaia
- Cave of Oliaros, Antiparos Isl, Prefecture of Cyclades
- Cave of Parasta, Kastelorizo Isl, Prefecture of Dodecanese
- Cave of the Seven Virgins, Kalymnos Isl, Prefecture of Dodecanese
- Cave of Trypas Kefalas – near Kefala, Kalymnos Isl, Prefecture of Dodecanese
- Corycian Cave
- Dirou Cave complex (water cave) – near Areopoli, Prefecture of Laconia, includes:
  - River cave of Glyfada
  - Alepotrypa Cave
- Drogarati Cave – near Chaliotata, Kefalonia Isl, Prefecture of Kefalonia
- Franchthi Cave, Prefecture of Argolis
- Kalamakia Cave, fossil-bearing cave in the Mani Peninsula
- Kastania Cave near Neapolis, Monemvasia Municipality, Prefecture of Laconia
- Kastritsa Cave – near Katsikas, Prefecture of Ioannina
- Katafyghi – near Aghios Nikolaos (Selenitsa), Prefecture of Messinia
- Kleidi Cave – near Konitsa in the Ioannina prefecture
- Klissoura Cave 1, paleolithic site.
- Korykio or Korykion Andron, Mount Parnitha, Prefecture of Attica
- Megalakkos Cave – near Konitsa, Prefecture of Ioannina
- Melissani Cave in Kefalonia Isl, Prefecture of Kefalonia
- Perama Cave – near Perama, Prefecture of Ioannina
- Cave of Trypia Petra or Blue cave, Lalaria beach, Skiathos Isl, Prefecture of Magnesia
- Trypitis – near Glysteri, Skopelos Isl, Prefecture of Magnesia
- Vari Cave, Mount Hymettus, Athens, Prefecture of Attica
- Vrachoskepi or Asprochaliko Cave – near Filippiada, Prefecture of Preveza
- Blue Cave, Kastelorizo Isl, Prefecture of Dodecanese
- Cave of Panagia Spiliani – near Mandraki, Nisyros Isl, Prefecture of Dodecanese
- Cave of Vathis, Kalymnos Isl, Prefecture of Dodecanese
- Cave of Aghios Antonios, Prefecture of Rethymno, Crete
- Cave of Aghios Ioannis Erimitis, Akrotiri Peninsula, Prefecture of Chania, Crete
- Cave of Aghios Mamas, Elafonisi Isl, Prefecture of Chania, Crete
- Cave of Aghia Sophia – near Topolia, Prefecture of Chania, Crete
- Cave of Aghia Paraskevi – near Gouves, Prefecture of Heraklion, Crete
- Cave of Genari, Prefecture of Rethymno, Crete
- Cave of Gouverneto or Arkoudas, Akrotiri Peninsula, Prefecture of Chania, Crete
- Cave of Eylithias – near Amnissos, Prefecture of Heraklion, Crete
- Cave of Kamares, Prefecture of Heraklion, Crete
- Cave of Idi or Idieon Andron, Mount Idi, Prefecture of Heraklion, Crete
- Cave of Dikti or Diktieon Andron, Mount Dikti or Lasithi, Prefecture of Lasithi, Crete
- Cave of Melidoni, Prefecture of Rethymno, Crete
- Cave of Milatos, Prefecture of Lasithi, Crete
- Cave of Pelekita or Sykias, Pelekita beach – near Kato Zakros, Prefecture of Lasithi, Crete
- Cave of Sfendoni – near Zoniana, Prefecture of Rethymno, Crete
- Didima Caves – near Didima, Prefecture of Argolis
- Mount Olympus Caves, Tempi Valley, Prefecture of Larissa
- Ochyron Cave or the cave of the Cyclops – near Maronia, Prefecture of Rodopi
- Blue Lake Cave, Zakynthos Isl
- Mount Ohi Cave or cave of Aghia Triada – near Karystos, Evia Isl, Prefecture of Evia
- Halandriani Cave, Syros Isl, Prefecture of Cyclades
- Fanokopeio Cave or cave of Aghia Sophia, Kythira Isl, South Peloponnese, Prefecture of Piraeus
- Cave of Proussos or Black cave, Mount Panetolikon, Prefecture of Evritania
- Panormos Cave, Mykonos Isl, Prefecture of Cyclades
- Cave of the Apocalipse – Aghios Ioannis, Patmos Isl, Prefecture of Dodecanese
- Cave of Zoures and Cave of Harakas – near Azogyres, Prefecture of Chania, Crete
- Cave of Kournas, Kournas lake, Prefecture of Chania, Crete
- Cave of Centaurus, Mount Pelion, Prefecture of Magnesia
- Water Cave of Loumbarda, Platania, Prefecture of Magnesia
- The Huge water caves of Horefto, Amaliapolis, Prefecture of Magnesia
- Heiron Cave – near Vizitsa, Mount Pelion, Prefecture of Magnesia
- Tsanaka Cave, Kanalia, Prefecture of Karditsa
- Cave of Mavromati or Georgios Karaiskakis, Mavromati, Prefecture of Karditsa
- Cave of Boursi or Kefalovryso – near Elasson, Prefecture of Larissa
- Cave of the Cyclops Polyphemos – near Makri, Prefecture of Evros
- The Two caves, Didimoteiho, Prefecture of Evros
- Cave of Aghia Paraskevi – near Deskati, Prefecture of Grevena
- Cave of Zakas, Mount Orliakas, Prefecture of Grevena
- Cave of Dispili – near Dispili, Prefecture of Kastoria
- The Dark Cave – near Akrini, Prefecture of Kozani
- Prionia Cave, Mount Vermio, Prefecture of Imathia
- Saranda Outades Cave, city of Naoussa, Prefecture of Imathia
- Neolithic Cave of Rodohorion, Prefecture of Imathia
- Drakotrypa Cave – near Panagia, Thasos Isl, Prefecture of Kavala
- Efta Myloi Cave – near Serres, Prefecture of Serres
- Lyhnos bay cave complex & the cave of Afrodite – near Parga, Prefecture of Preveza
- Cave complex of Lynaria, Skyros Isl, Prefecture of Evia
- Cave of Ntavelli – near Aghia Triada, Mount Penteli, Prefecture of Attica
- Cave of Euripides – near Peristeria, Salamina Isl, Prefecture of Piraeus
- Cave of Cyclops – near Astakos, Prefecture of Aetolia & Acarnania
- Cave of Syllas, Thermes of Edipsos, Prefecture of Evia
- Pasogourni Cave – near Lihada, Prefecture of Evia
- Cave of Loizos – near Stavros, Ithaka Isl, Prefecture of Kefalonia
- Cave of Nymphs – near Vathy, Ithaka Isl, Prefecture of Kefalonia
- Water cave of Ypapanti – near Lakka, Paxi Isl, Prefecture of Corfu
- Cave of the Demon – near Spartohorion, Lefkada Isl, Prefecture of Lefkada
- Cave of Papanikolis, Lefkada Isl, Prefecture of Lefkada
- Cave of Spileovouno – near Fiskardo, Kefalonia Isl, Prefecture of Kefalonia
- Cave of Drakospilia – near Lixouri, Kefalonia Isl, Prefecture of Kefalonia
- Cave of Agios Gerasimos – near Argostolion, Kefalonia Isl, Prefecture of Kefalonia
- Cave of Zervatis – near Sami, Karavomylos, Kefalonia Isl, Prefecture of Kefalonia
- Sakkos Cave – near Skala, Temple of Apollo, Kefalonia Isl, Prefecture of Kefalonia
- Pelaou Cave – near Aghios Mattheos, Corfu Isl, Prefecture of Corfu
- Dionysus Cave or cave of Sintzas – near Leonidio, Prefecture of Arkadia
- The Lovers' Cave, Tigani beach – near Tyros, Prefecture of Arkadia
- Cave of Neraidotrypa – near Portes, Kato Achaia, Prefecture of Achaia
- The Watercave – near Aghia Marina, Prefecture of Chania, Crete
- Sarakena Cave – near Therissos, Prefecture of Chania, Crete
- Daskalojianni Cave – near Fragkocastello, Prefecture of Chania, Crete
- Hoirospelios Cave – near Fournes, Prefecture of Chania, Crete
- Ahladolakki Cave and Grai Cave – near Malaxa, Prefecture of Chania, Crete
- The Minoan holy cave – near Arkalohorion, Prefecture of Heraklion, Crete
- Hosto Nero Cave – near Arhanes, Prefecture of Heraklion, Crete
- Honos Cave – near Asites, Prefecture of Heraklion, Crete
- Cave of Vigla – near Viannos, Prefecture of Heraklion, Crete
- Matala Caves or cave complex of Kommos, Prefecture of Heraklion, Crete
- Trapeza Cave, Mount Dikti or Lasithi, Prefecture of Lasithi, Crete
- Cave of Panagia Poulariani – near Analipsi, Astypalea Isl, Prefecture of Dodecanese
- Dragon Cave – near Vathi, Astypalea Isl, Prefecture of Dodecanese
- Negrou Cave – near Lebadia, Astypalea Isl, Prefecture of Dodecanese
- Emporeios Caves, Kalymnos Isl, Prefecture of Dodecanese
- Poseidon Cave – near Myloi, Karpathos Isl, Prefecture of Dodecanese
- Aspri Petra Cave – near Palatia, Kos Isl, Prefecture of Dodecanese
- Holy cave of the Nymphs – near the city of Rhodes, Rhodes Isl, Prefecture of Dodecanese
- Kalamonias Cave – near Faliraki, Rhodes Isl, Prefecture of Dodecanese
- Makarouna Cave – near Kalamos, Rhodes Isl, Prefecture of Dodecanese
- Koumelou Cave – near Arhaggelos, Rhodes Isl, Prefecture of Dodecanese
- Kelia Caves, Chalki Isl, Prefecture of Dodecanese
- Kammenos Cave – near Amiglai, Chalki Isl, Prefecture of Dodecanese
- Chaos Cave – near Mesaria, Andros Isl, Prefecture of Cyclades
- Vromolimni Cave, Kimolos Isl, Prefecture of Cyclades
- Ktafyki Cave – near Dryopida, Kythnos Isl, Prefecture of Cyclades
- Cave of Za – near Filotas, Naxos Isl, Prefecture of Cyclades
- Cave of Koutala or Cyclop, Seriphos Isl, Prefecture of Cyclades
- Gastria Cave – near Kionia, Tinos Isl, Prefecture of Cyclades
- Two Caves – near Panormos, Tinos Isl, Prefecture of Cyclades
- Papafragka Cave – near Apollonia, Archeological site, Milos Isl, Prefecture of Cyclades
- Cave of Toihos – near Hivadolimni, Donoussa Isl, Prefecture of Cyclades
- Blu Caves, Kato Koufonisi Isl, Prefecture of Cyclades
- Black Cave – near Kastro, Sikinos Isl, Prefecture of Cyclades
- Golden Cave, Folegandros Isl, Prefecture of Cyclades
- Cave of Georghitsi – near Karavostasis, Folegandros Isl, Prefecture of Cyclades
- Cave of Aghios Vartholomeos – near Mytilene, Lesvos Isl, Prefecture of Lesvos & Lemnos
- Black Stone Cave – near Plomari, Lesvos Isl, Prefecture of Lesvos and Lemnos
- Cave of Aghios Isidoros – near Plomari, Lesvos Isl, Prefecture of Lesvos and Lemnos
- Kokkala Cave – near Plomari, Lesvos Isl, Prefecture of Lesvos and Lemnos
- Cave of Pythagora – near Marathokampos, Samos Isl, Prefecture of Samos and Ikaria
- Church Cave of Sarandaskaliotissa – near Marathokampos, Samos Isl, Prefecture of Samos and Ikaria
- Cave of Trypiovrahos – near Pyrgos, Samos Isl, Prefecture of Samos and Ikaria
- Cave of Philoctetes – near Kontopouli, Lemnos Isl, Prefecture of Lesvos and Lemnos
- Dersios Sinkhole – near Tyros, Prefecture of Arcadia

== See also ==
- List of caves
- Speleology
