= Pano =

Pano may refer to:

== Culture and language ==
- Páno, one of the family of Panoan languages, within the wider group of Pano-Tacanan languages spoken in South America
- Pano people or Tsimané people, Bolivia
- Paño, a form of prison artwork from Chicano people in the United States
- Pano (caste), a Dalit scheduled caste
- Pano, a 2021 song by Zack Tabudlo

== People ==
Given name

- Pano Angelov Apostolov, known also as Karabadzhakov, Bulgarian revolutionary, a worker of the Internal Macedonian-Adrianople Revolutionary Organization
- Pano Capéronis (born 1947), Swiss freestyle swimmer

Surname

- Alexa Pano (born 2004), American amateur golfer.
- Antoine Pano (born 1952), Lebanese politician and retired general in the Lebanese Armed Forces
- Ledio Pano (born 1968), Albanian footballer
- Panajot Pano, Albanian footballer

Fictional characters

- Pano Rodokin, a character in the MÄR manga series

== Other uses ==
- Pano Aqil, a taluka (administrative division) in Pakistan
- Pano Logic, computer hardware and software manufacturer
- Panorama
- Panosteitis, a common bone disease in dogs
- Nondalton Airport, Alaska, with ICAO code PANO
- Pano, an abandoned village in the Spanish municipality of Graus

== See also ==
- Panos (disambiguation)
