= Karyai =

Karyai may refer to:

- Caryae, a town of ancient Arcadia and Laconia
- Caryae (Arcadia), a town of ancient Arcadia
- Karyes, Mount Athos, a town on Mount Athos
