= Panos =

Panos may refer to:

== People with the given name ==
Panos is the diminutive of Panagiotis (Panayiotis), a Christian name.

- Panos Antsaklis, American engineer
- Panos Aravantinos (1886–1930), Greek and German opera scenery and costume designer and decorator
- Panos Armenakas (born 1998), American-born Australian footballer
- Panos Bardis (1924–1996), Greek American sociologist
- Panos Constantinou (born 1985), Cypriot footballer
- Panos Cosmatos (born 1974), Italian-Canadian film director and screenwriter
- Panos Gavalas (1926–1988), Greek singer
- Panos Ioannides, Cypriot novelist and playwright
- Panos Ioannou (1951–2005), Cypriot biologist and neuroscientist
- Panos Ipeirotis (born 1976), Greek professor
- Panos Kalaitzakis (born 1999), Greek basketball player
- Panos Kallitsis (born 1974), Greek hairstylist and make-up artist
- Panos Kammenos (born 1965), Greek politician
- Panos Karan (born 1982), British classical pianist, conductor and composer of Greek origin
- Panos Kiamos, Greek laiko–pop singer
- Panos H. Koutras, Greek filmmaker, writer
- Panos Michalopoulos (born 1949), Greek actor
- Panos Mourdoukoutas (born 1955), American economist
- Panos Mouzourakis (born 1979), Greek artist, singer, songwriter and actor
- Panos Panay (born 1972), Cypriot entrepreneur, executive and author
- Panos Panagiotopoulos (born 1957), Greek politician
- Panos Papadopoulos (born 1958), Greek designer and entrepreneur
- Panos Paparrigopoulos (1913–1985), Greek poet and writer
- Panos Terlemezian (1865–1941), Ottoman Armenian / Soviet Armenian landscape and portrait painter
- Panos Theodorou (born 1994), Cypriot footballer
- Panos Valavanis (1954–2025), Greek classical archaeologist

== People with the surname ==
=== Panos ===
- Joe Panos (born 1971), American football offensive lineman in the NFL
- Mickaël Panos (born 1997), French footballer
- Steve Panos (born 1988), Greek-American basketball player
- Toss Panos, Greek-American drummer
- Vickie Panos (1920–1986), Canadian baseball player
- Xenofon Panos (born 1989), Greek footballer

=== Paños ===
- Javi Paños García-Villamil (born 1991), Spanish footballer
- Sandra Paños, Spanish footballer

== Others ==
- Panos (operating system), a computer operating system used by some products of Acorn Computers in the 1980s
- Panos Network, a network of independent non-governmental institutes involved in communication for development
- Panos Pictures, a photo agency based in London
- panos, the plural of pano, short for "panoramic photograph"

== See also ==
- Paños, Chicano prison artwork in the U.S. southwest
