= Kleidonia =

Kleidonia Κλειδωνιά
- Community
- Location within Greece
- Coordinates: 39°59′N 20°41′E
- Country: Greece
- Administrative region: Epirus
- Regional unit: Ioannina
- Municipality: Konitsa
- Municipal unit: Konitsa

Population (2021)
  - Community: 132
- Time zone: UTC+2 (EET)
  - Summer (DST): UTC+3 (EEST)
- Vehicle registration: ΙΝ

Kleidonia (Greek: Κλειδωνιά) is a village and a community in the municipality of Konitsa, Ioannina regional unit, Epirus, Greece. The community includes the village Kalyvia. The Greek National Road 20 (Ioannina - Konitsa - Kozani) passes through Kalyvia. It is situated on the right bank of the river Voidomatis, a tributary of the Aoos.

== Population ==
Year	Village population	Community population
1981	-	237
1991	33	-
2001	12	217
2011	11	136
2021	8	132

== History ==
Two prehistoric locations have been found near Kleidonia:

- Kleidi Cave
- Megalakkos Cave

In these two caves there are archaeological remains that date back to 20,000 and 12,000 years ago, in the later period of the Paleolithic Era in Greece.

== See also ==
- List of settlements in the Ioannina regional unit
