= Filia, Achaea =

Filia Φίλια
- Community
- Location within Greece
- Coordinates: 37°51′N 22°7′E
- Country: Greece
- Administrative region: West Greece
- Regional unit: Achaea
- Municipality: Kalavryta
- Municipal unit: Kleitoria
- Elevation: 850 m (2,790 ft)

Population (2021)
  - Community: 154
- Time zone: UTC+2 (EET)
  - Summer (DST): UTC+3 (EEST)
- Postal code: 250 07
- Vehicle registration: AX

Filia (Greek: Φίλια) is a village and a community in southern Achaea, Greece. Filia is located at the northwestern foot of the hill Mouzakeika (Μουζακεϊκα), at 850 m elevation. It is 1 km south of Lefkasio, 20 km south of Kalavryta, and 45 km northwest of Tripoli. The community includes the smaller villages Agioi Theodoroi, Kalyvia and Zevgolatio.

== Population ==
Year	Village	Community
1981	-	458
1991	169	-
2001	228	358
2011	130	211
2021	97	154

== People ==
- Panos Paparrigopoulos, poet

== See also ==
- List of settlements in Achaea
