= Aroanios =

Location
- Country: Greece

Physical characteristics
- Source
  - location: Aroania
- Mouth
  - location: Ladon
  - coordinates: 37°49′47″N 22°9′28″E
- Length: 12km

Basin features
- Progression: Ladon→ Alfeios→ Ionian Sea

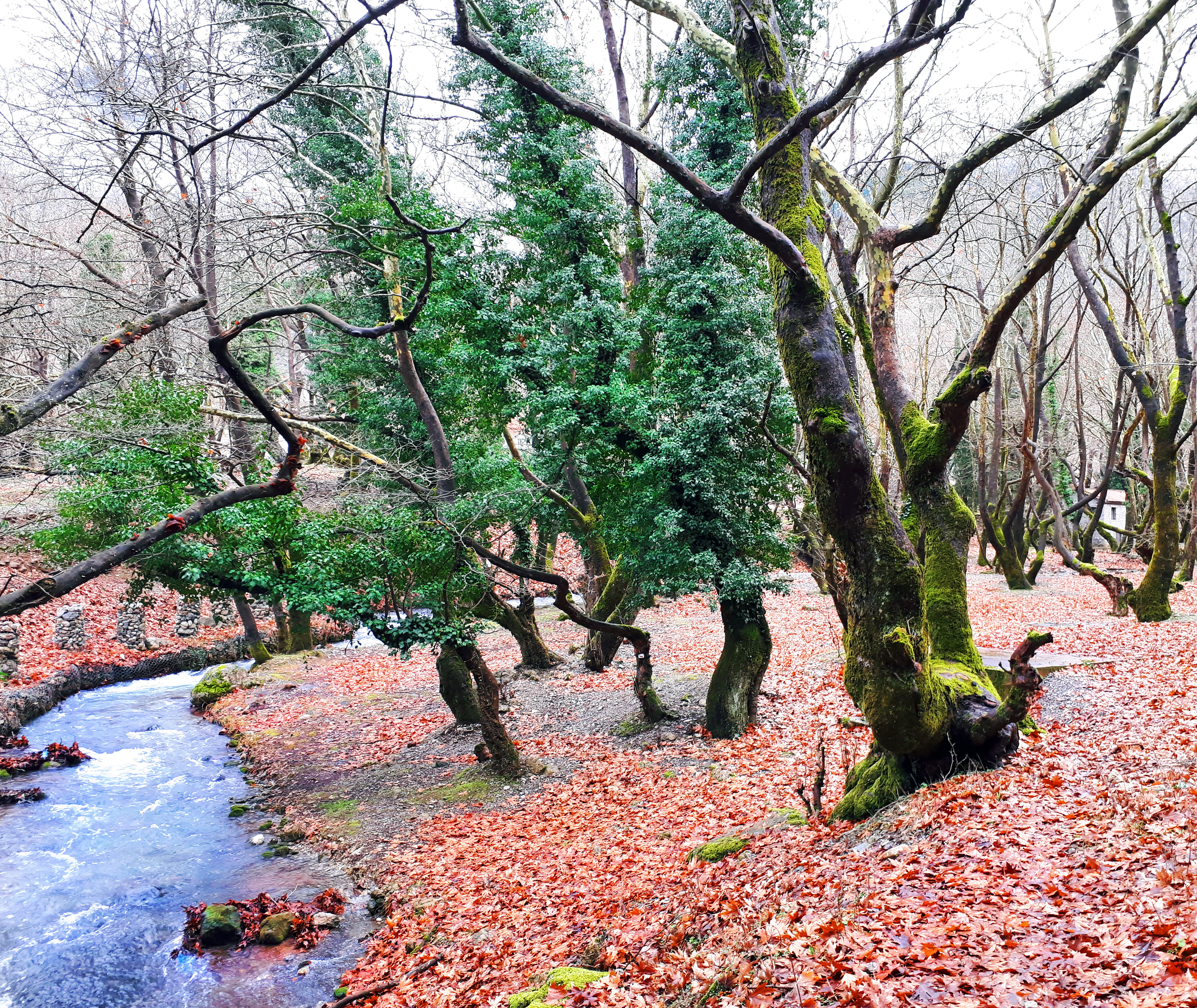
View of the landscape near Aroanios' River, karst springs

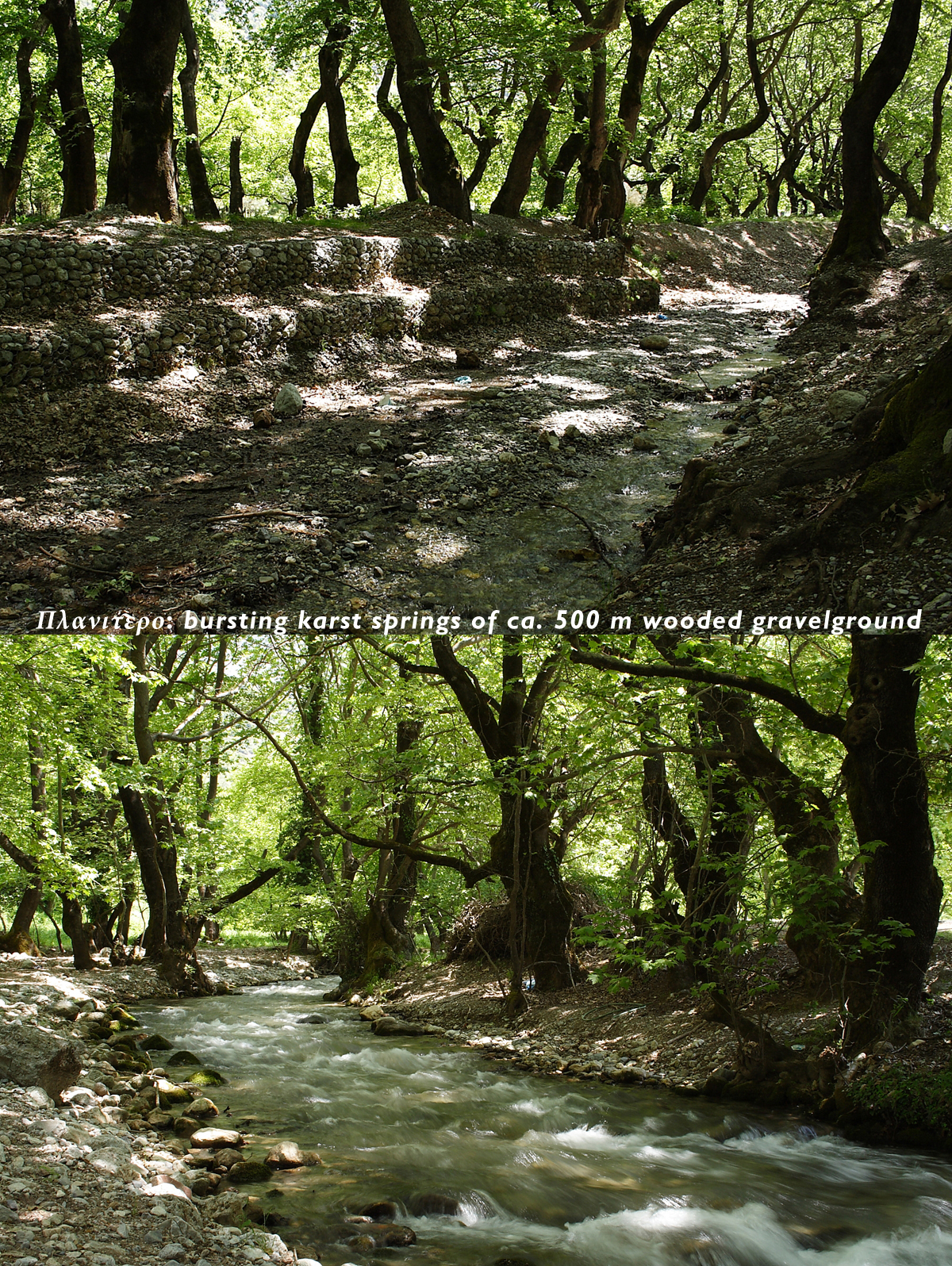
Karst spring. After 600m: 41 small karst spring outlets make an enormous water amount

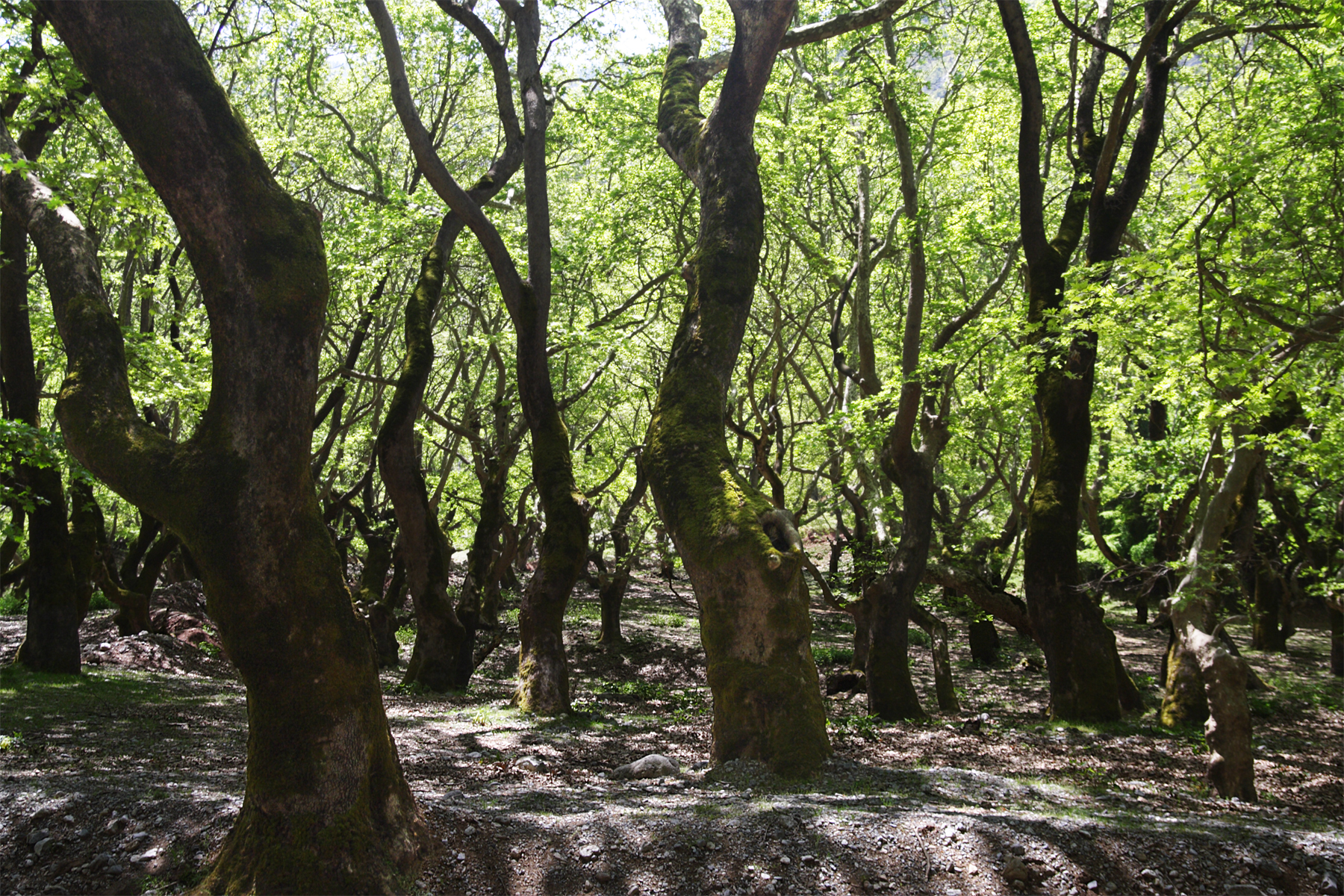
naturally watered forest of platanus trees in sand and gravel

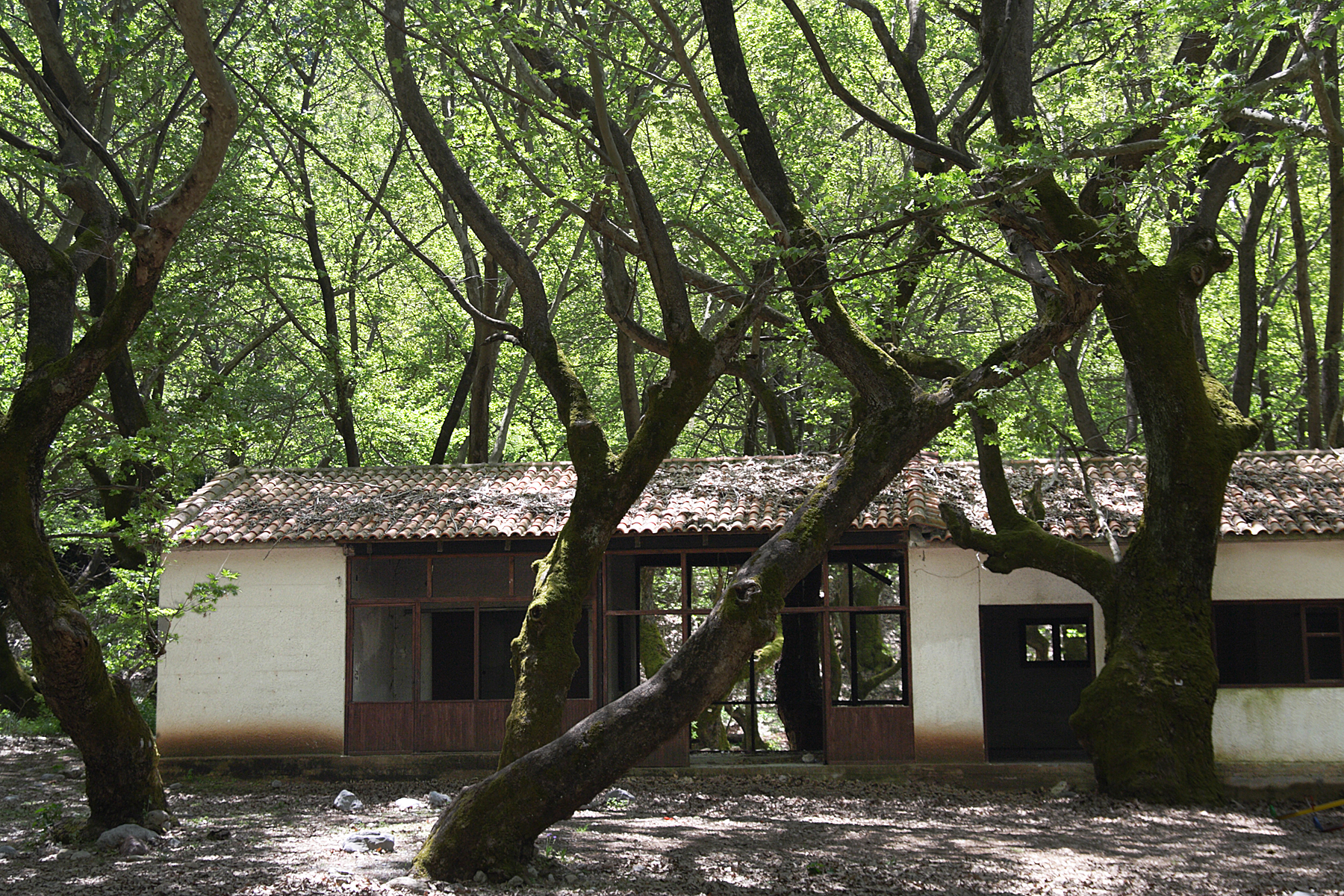
Buildings, abandoned, are standing directly in the fragile nature

The Aroanios (Greek: Αροάνιος; Ancient Greek: Ἀροάνιος; Latin: Aroanius) is a river in the southern part of Achaea, Greece and a tributary of Ladon river. The water comes from the carbonate mountain range Aroania (1500-2300m). After 12 km, it meets the Ladonas (near to Pangrataika Kalyvia) in the area of "Helongospilia” (Χελωνοσπηλιά).

== The river ==
The river has carried rock debris, soil and parts of trees and plants from the mountain range of Aroania (also known as Chelmos, Χελμός), to deposit it in the valley. This occurs mainly in the wet seasons of the Quaternary. In addition, the Scree (rock fragments) from the surrounding mountains formed further layers of sediment in the valley. The surface of the valley was gradually covered by layers of clayish, fertile soil. Valley and river achieved their modern form. People of the villages and small towns cultivated the ground. At the confluence of the small rivers Λαγκάδα, Ξηρόρεμα and Kleitoras, coming from the carbonate mountains in the west, their alluvial fan expanded the valley drastically. Here, on a hill in the widened valley, the largest town of the valley has developed: Kleitoria. The local residents turned the whole valley into a picturesque, beautiful Cultural landscape with fields, gardens and many trees. Its name is “Katsana”.

== Ancient Greece ==
Pausanias (110-180 AD) in his book “Description of Greece” (Ancient Greek: Ἑλλάδος Περιήγησις) already used the name “Aroanios” for the valley's river. The preserved publications of Polybios (208-125 BC, “Historíai”) and of Pliny the Elder (AD 23-79, “Naturalis historia”) confirm Pausanias’ description, but are less precise and informative. Aroanios is the river's official name. But at some point in the past the river bore the name Katzanas or Katsanas (Κατσάνας, en: Katzánas). The cited ancient book authors also report on the antique city Cleitor as predecessor of modern Kleitoria - again Pausanias is the most precise. Wall remnants are still visible in the valley only 1300m west of the modern town. At Kleitoria's position - in the middle of the broad valley - the three small river waters merge with River Aroanios. The River Aroanios must not be confused with another, smaller river of the same name. That river flows generally southwest bound and pours into River Erymanthos at the community Psofida.

== The karst springs ==
The karst springs of River Aroanios (for other karst springs on the Peloponnese see el:Καρστική πηγή) emerge in a small forest of „plane trees“ (580x30m) next to the village of Planitero (Achaea). The plane trees obviously benefit from the karst springs water. The very small outlets together issue a huge amount of karst water after a fairly short distance. They feed River Aroanios. A detailed international geological study lists 41 of these spring outlets. According to this study the waters of the outlets emerge directly from local karstic rock layers, which outcrop here, or they rise from the loose Sedimentation (Silicate minerals, sand and gravel). Rainbow trout farms, restaurants and displays of tourist ware crowd the whole area. In summer the forest is part of an excursion for residents, who come in busses and private cars even from Patras, despite the long distance.

== Environment and nature ==
The springs under the wooded area form a natural area classified as a geotope.

== See also ==
- Drainage basin

== Literature ==
- A. Morfis, Athens, H. Zojer, Graz. Karst Hydrogeology of the Central and Eastern Peloponnesus (Greece), Steirische Beiträge zur Hydrogeologie, Graz (Austria) 1986
- Design and implementation, "Environmental Education Centre of Kleitoria - Akrata" (KEP). Raising the consciousness about crucial environmental problems for Greek pupils and teachers’. Kleitoria, (Achaea), 2004. See External Links.
- William Smith, Dictionary of Greek and Roman Geography. London 1854.
- Pausanias, Description of Greece. English Translation by W.H.S. Jones and H.A. Ormerod, London 1918.
