= Penteleium =

Fortress of ancient Arcadia

Penteleium or Penteleion (Ancient Greek: Πεντέλειον) was a fortress in the north of ancient Arcadia near Pheneus, situated upon a mountain of the same name. Its site is unlocated.
