= Kastria =

Kastriá Καστρία
- Community
- Location within Greece
- Coordinates: 38°2′N 22°7′E
- Country: Greece
- Administrative region: West Greece
- Regional unit: Achaea
- Municipality: Kalavryta
- Municipal unit: Kleitoria
- Elevation: 800 m (2,600 ft)

Population (2021)
  - Community: 83
- Time zone: UTC+2 (EET)
  - Summer (DST): UTC+3 (EEST)
- Postal code: 25007
- Area code: 26920

Kastria (Greek: Καστρία) is a small village in the Peloponnese peninsula, Greece. It is part of the municipality Kalavryta.

It is near the Cave of the Lakes.

It is just down the road from Glastra.
