= Kleitor, Achaea =

Kleitor Κλειτορ
- Community
- Location within Greece
- Coordinates: 37°54′N 22°8′E
- Country: Greece
- Geographic region: Peloponnese
- Administrative region: West Greece
- Regional unit: Achaea
- Municipality: Kalavryta
- Municipal unit: Kleitoria
- Elevation: 548 m (1,798 ft)

Population (2021)
  - Community: 44
- Time zone: UTC+2 (EET)
  - Summer (DST): UTC+3 (EEST)
- Postal code: 25007
- Area code: 26920
- Vehicle registration: AX

Kleitor is a village and community in Achaea, Greece. It is part of the municipality Kalavryta.

For the ancient city see: Ancient Kleitor
