= Kleitor River =

River in Achaea, Greece

The Kleitor or Cleitor river (Greek: Κλείτορας ποταμός) is a river of Achaea that flows into the Aroanios near the site of the ancient city of Cleitor.
