= Megalakkos =

Cave and archaeological site in Greece

Megalakkos Cave
- Σπήλαιο Μεγάλακκος (Ancient Greek)
- location in Greece
- 39°58′51″N 20°40′2″E
- Location: north of Kleidonia
- Region: Ioannina regional unit, northwestern Greece

The Megalakkos (Greek: Σπήλαιο Μεγάλακκος, Spelaio Megalokkos) is a rock shelter located north of the village of Kleidonia in the Ioannina regional unit and around 500 m (1,600 ft) east of the Kleidi Cave, northwestern Greece. It sits atop the northern bank of the Voidomatis river valley.

== Archaeology ==
Archaeological excavations that were undertaken by a British team between 1983 and 1986 revealed the cave with a height of 2 m (6.6 ft), it contained artefacts, stone tools, faunal remains and other fossils, that were dated back to the Palaeolithic and the Epigravettian culture between 20,000 and 12,000 years ago. Analogous discoveries were made by the same research team in the neighbouring Kleidi Cave.
