= Planitero =

Planitero Πλανητέρο
- Community
- Location within Greece
- Coordinates: 37°56′27″N 22°09′53″E
- Country: Greece
- Administrative region: Western Greece
- Regional unit: Achaea
- Municipality: Kalavryta
- Municipal unit: Kleitoria

Population (2021)
  - Community: 151
- Time zone: UTC+2 (EET)
  - Summer (DST): UTC+3 (EEST)

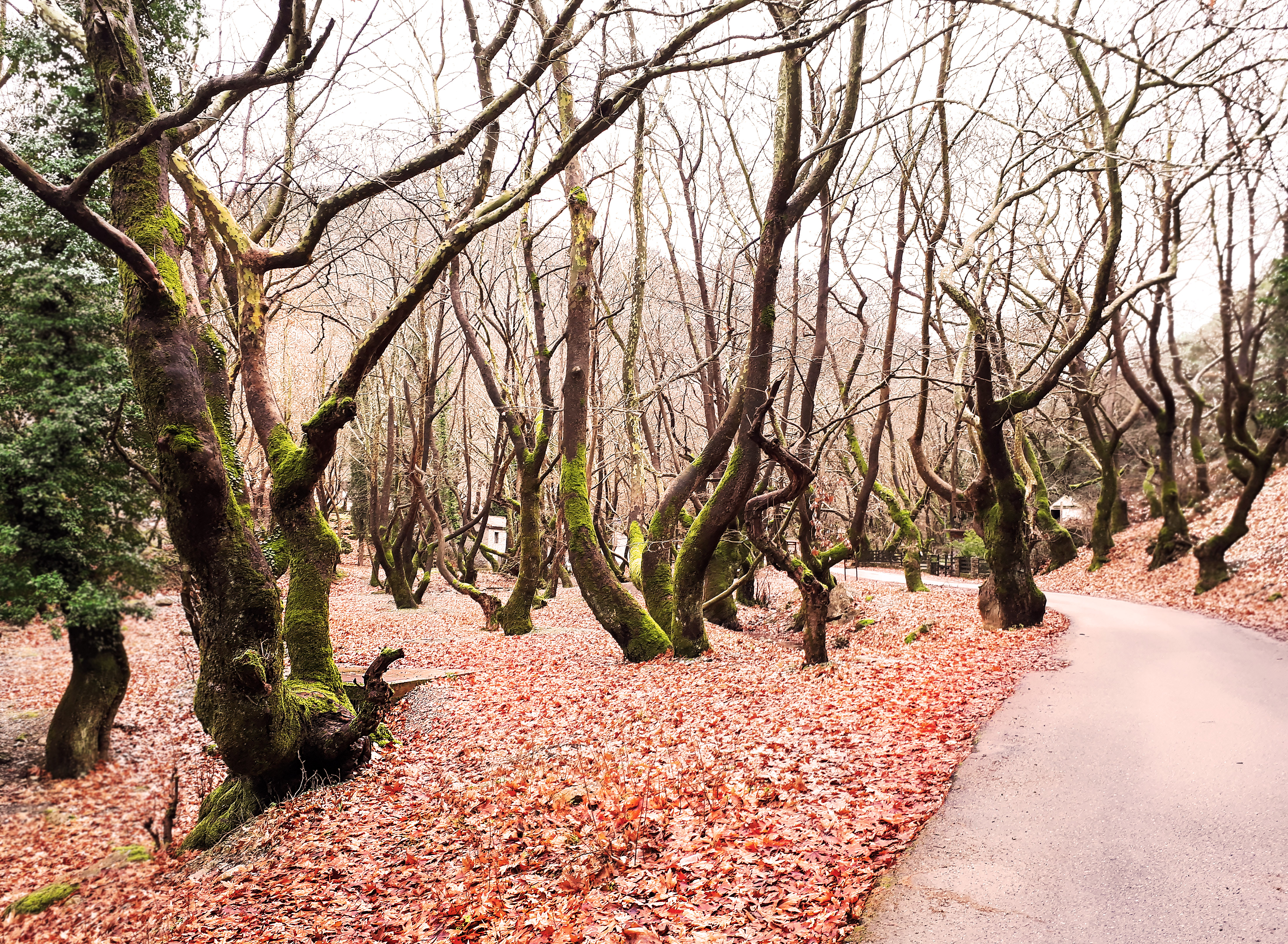
View of the landscape near Aroanios' River source in the area of Planitero village.

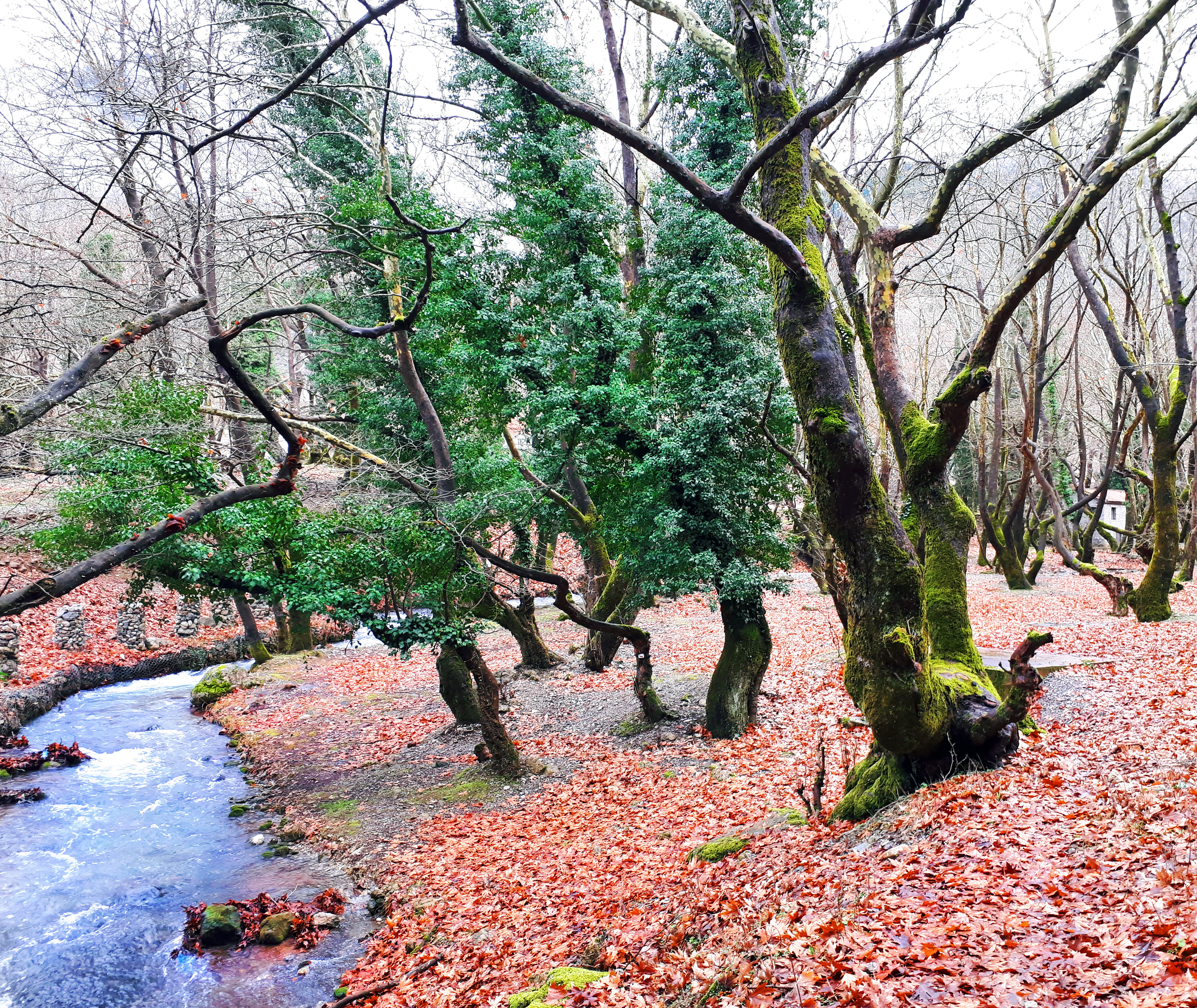
View of the landscape near Aroanios' River source in the area of Planitero village.

Planitero (Greek: Πλανητέρο) is a mountain village in the municipal unit of Kleitoria, Achaea, Greece. It is situated in the southwestern part of the Chelmos (Aroania) mountains. Its elevation is 700 m. Planitero is 1.5 km north of Armpounas, 6 km northeast of Kleitoria and 12 km southeast of Kalavryta. The source of the river Aroanios is near Planitero.

== Population ==
Year	Population
1981	276
1991	258
2001	354
2011	197
2021	151

== See also ==
- List of settlements in Achaea
