= Caryae (Arcadia) =

Town in the north of ancient Arcadia

Coordinates: 37°19′51″N 22°26′38″E

Caryae or Karyai (Ancient Greek: Καρύαι), also known as Carya or Karya (Καρύα), was a town in the north of ancient Arcadia in the region of Pheneatis near Pheneus. It should be distinguished from the town of the same name located in the boundary zone between Laconia and Arcadia. It is cited by Pausanias, who says that it was at the end of a ravine, on the road from Orchomenus to Pheneus and from there was the plain of Pheneus. Five stadia from Caryae were the mountains Oryxis (Ὄρυξις), and Sciathis (Σκίαθις).

Modern scholars place its site is located near the modern Analipsis.
