= Glastra =

- Community
- Location within Greece
- Coordinates: 38°2′N 22°7′E
- Country: Greece
- Administrative region: West Greece
- Regional unit: Achaea
- Municipality: Kalavryta
- Municipal unit: Kleitoria
- Elevation: 553 m (1,814 ft)

Population (2021)
  - Community: 54
- Time zone: UTC+2 (EET)
  - Summer (DST): UTC+3 (EEST)
- Postal code: 25007
- Area code: 3026920

Glastra is a small village in the Peloponnese, Greece. It is part of the municipality of Kalavryta.

Nearby is the village of Kastria and the settlement of Agios Vlasios.
