= Aroania (mountain) =

Mountain in Greece

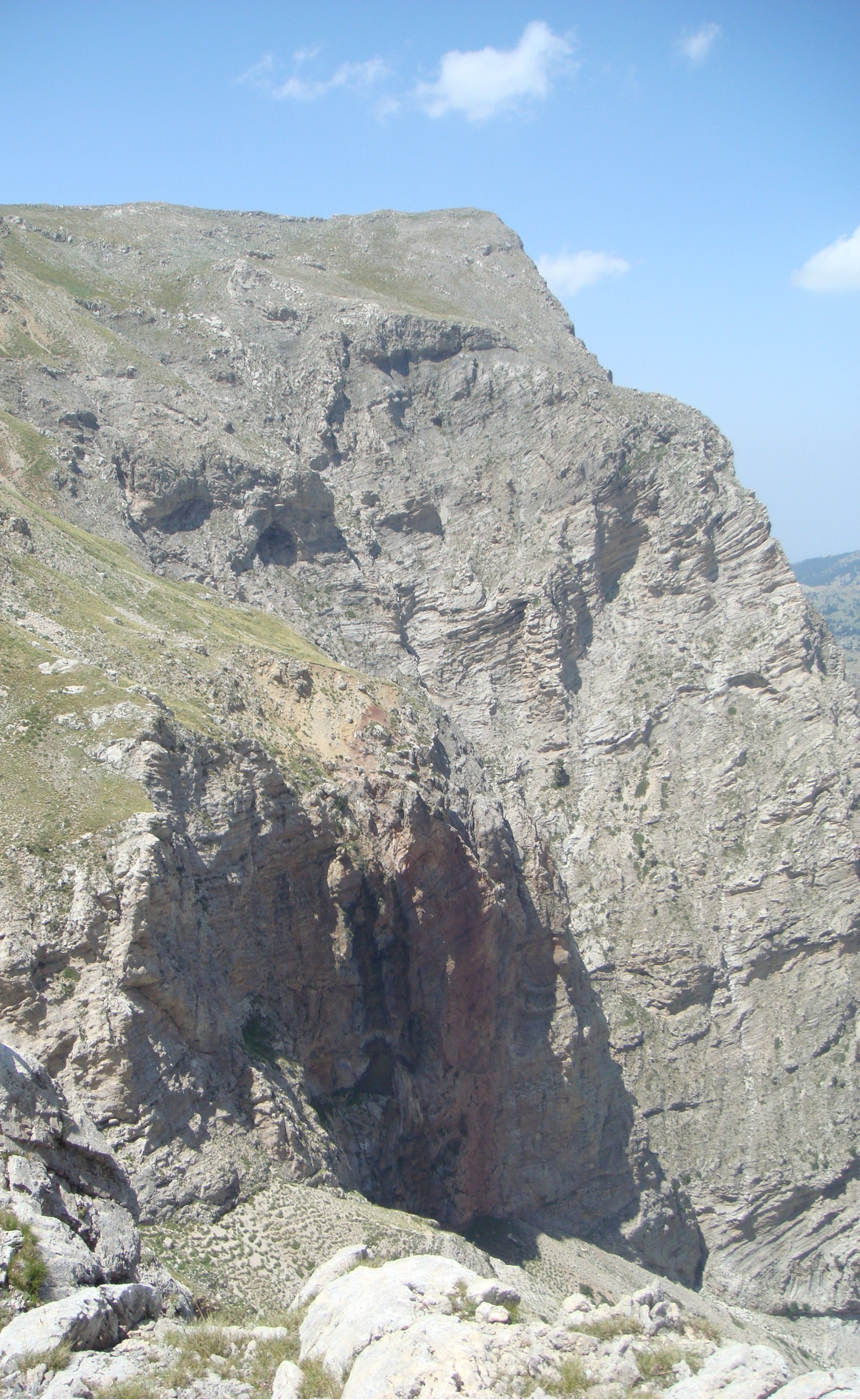
- Slopes of Neraidorachi and the Styx Waterfall

Highest point
- Elevation: 2,355 m (7,726 ft)
- Prominence: 1,043 m (3,422 ft)
- Listing: Ribu
- Coordinates: 37°58′26″N 22°12′25″E

Geography
- Location within Greece
- Location: southeastern Achaea, Greece

Aroania (Greek: Αροάνια), also known as Helmos or Chelmos (Χελμός, from South Slavic chlmo, 'summit'), is a mountain in Achaea, Peloponnese, Greece. At 2,355 m elevation, Aroania is the third highest mountain of the Peloponnese, after Taygetus and Kyllini, and the highest in Achaea. The largest town near the mountain is Kalavryta. The municipal unit Aroania took its name from the mountain.

== Geography ==
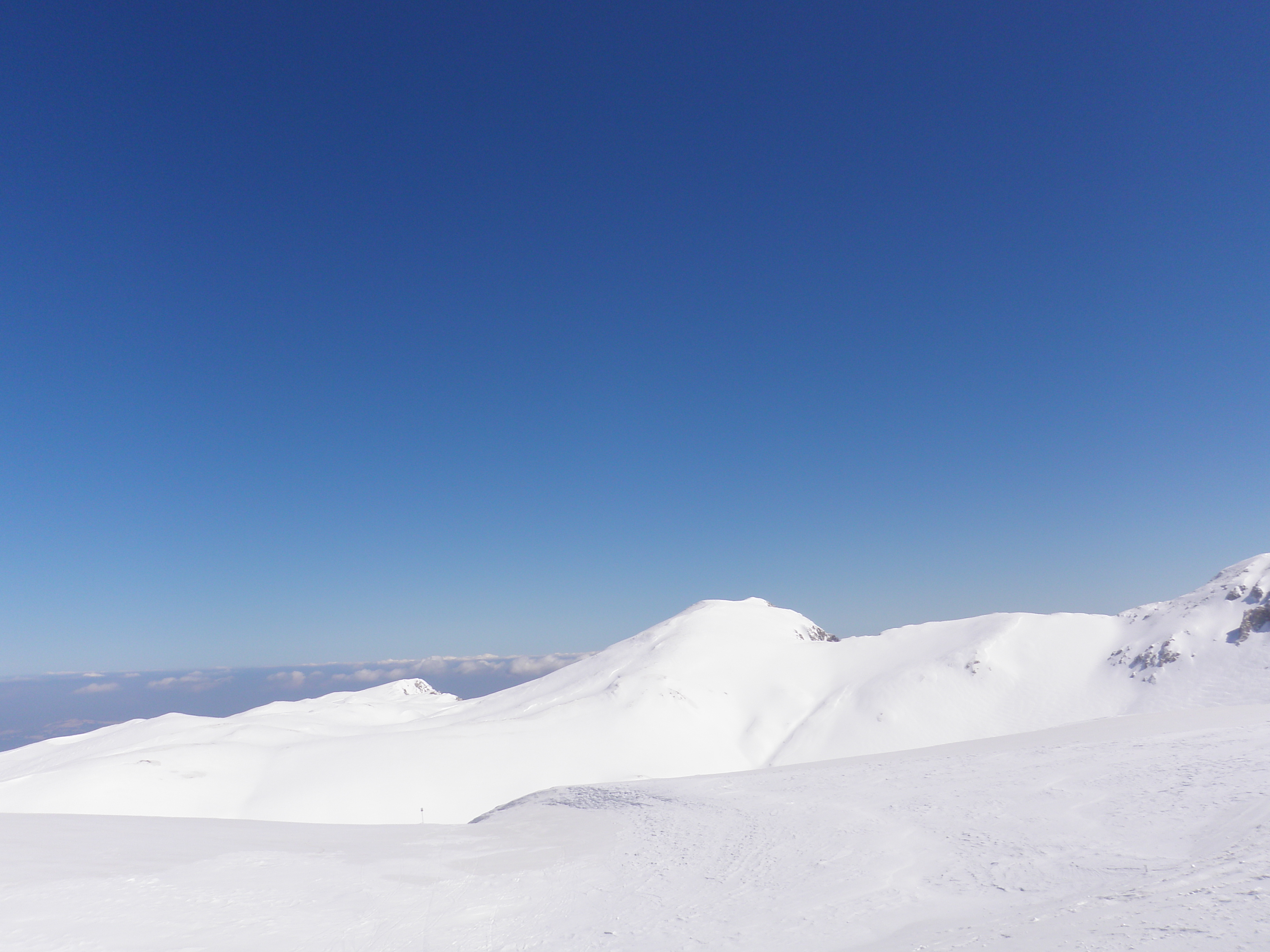
The peak

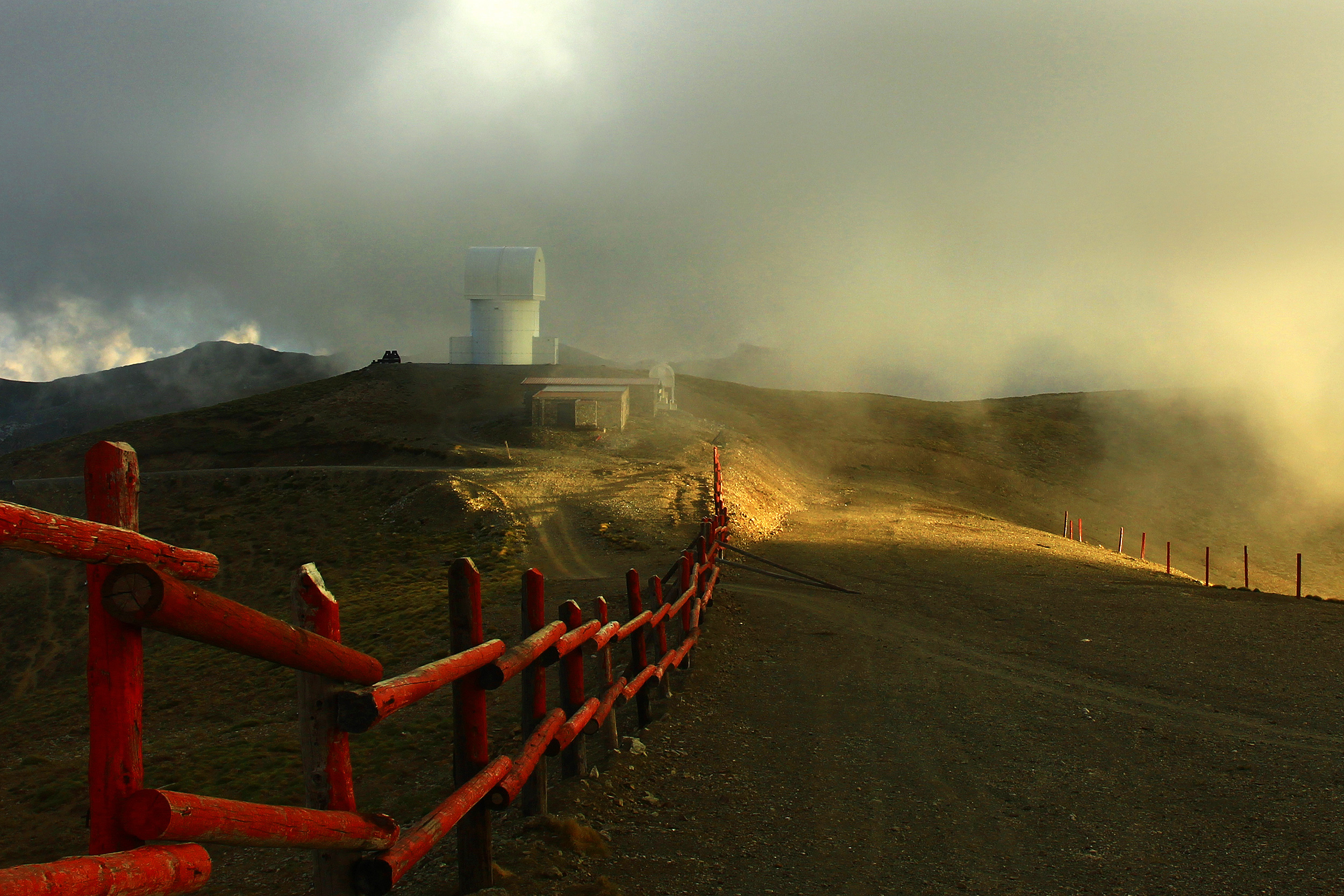
Aroania Observatory "Aimilios Charlaftis"

Aroania is situated in southeastern Achaea, near the border with Corinthia. The slightly higher Kyllini mountain is about 15 km to its east, separated from Aroania by the valley of the river Olvios. The mountain Erymanthos is about 30 km to the west, across the valley of the river Vouraikos. The rivers Krios, Krathis and Vouraikos drain the mountain towards the Gulf of Corinth in the north. The river Aroanios drains the mountain towards the southwest, to the Ionian Sea.

The mountain is the site of the Aristarchos telescope and of a ski resort. Points of interest on the mountain include the Cave of the Lakes (Spilaio ton Limnon), the monastery of Mega Spilaio and the mountain town Kalavryta. Mountain villages on the mountain are Planitero and Peristera. There are several protected areas on Aroania.

A list of the highest peaks of Mount Aroania:

- Psili Koryfi, 2355 m
- Neraidorachi, 2341 m
- Aetorachi, 2335 m
- Kokkinovrachos, 2315 m
- Gardii, 2182 m
- Avgo, 2138 m
- Nisi, 2080 m

== Flora and fauna ==
The parts of Aroania between 800 m and 1,800 m elevation are covered with pine forests. The higher areas consist of grasslands and barren rock. Aroania is rich in butterfly species, including the Chelmos blue (Agrodiaetus iphigenia) which is found between 1,100 m and 1,800 m.
