= Gourgouthakas =

Cave in Greece

- Interactive map of Gourgouthakas
- Location: Greece
- Coordinates: 35.3321681°N 024.0834517°E
- Depth: 1,129 metres (3,704 ft)
- Discovery: 1990
- Entrances: 1

Gourgouthakas (Greek: Γουργούθακας; from "small cutting on rocks, in which rain water is collected and from which animals drink water") is a cave located in the Lefka Ori mountains on the Greek island of Crete. Until resurveying in 2022, it was considered the deepest cave in Greece, with an explored depth of 1,208 metres (3,963 ft), and was the 43rd deepest in the world in 2010. Following the re-survey conducted by the Gourgouthakas expedition of 2022, the depth has been re-evaluated at 1,100 metres (3,600 ft). A dive of the terminal siphon in 2025 allowed reaching a depth of 1,129 metres (3,704 ft) for 80 meters in length.

Gourgouthakas was discovered in 1990 by the Speleological Mission of the Catamaran team, based in Μontbeliard, France. The depth of 985 m was reached in 1997. In 1998, the same group reached the small lake (sump) at the bottom, at a depth of 1,208 metres (3,963 ft). The lake has not yet been explored.

The cave is primarily a deep vertical shaft, filled with intersecting arcades and huge stalagmites and stalactites. Due to its configuration, specialized equipment and expertise is required to explore it.

== See also ==
List of caves in Greece
