= Pano Capéronis =

Swiss swimmer

Personal information
- Born: 16 August 1947 (age 78) Lausanne, Switzerland

Sport
- Sport: Swimming

Pano Capéronis (born 16 August 1947) is a Swiss former freestyle swimmer. He competed at the 1964 Summer Olympics and the 1968 Summer Olympics.
