= Klissoura Cave 1 =

Cave and archeological site in southern Greece

Klissoura Cave 1 is a cave in the Peloponnese region of southern Greece. From the late 20th to the early 21st century, the Klissoura Cave 1 has been a site for archaeologists since its excavation. It is presumed that this area and site were in use for over 90,000 years.

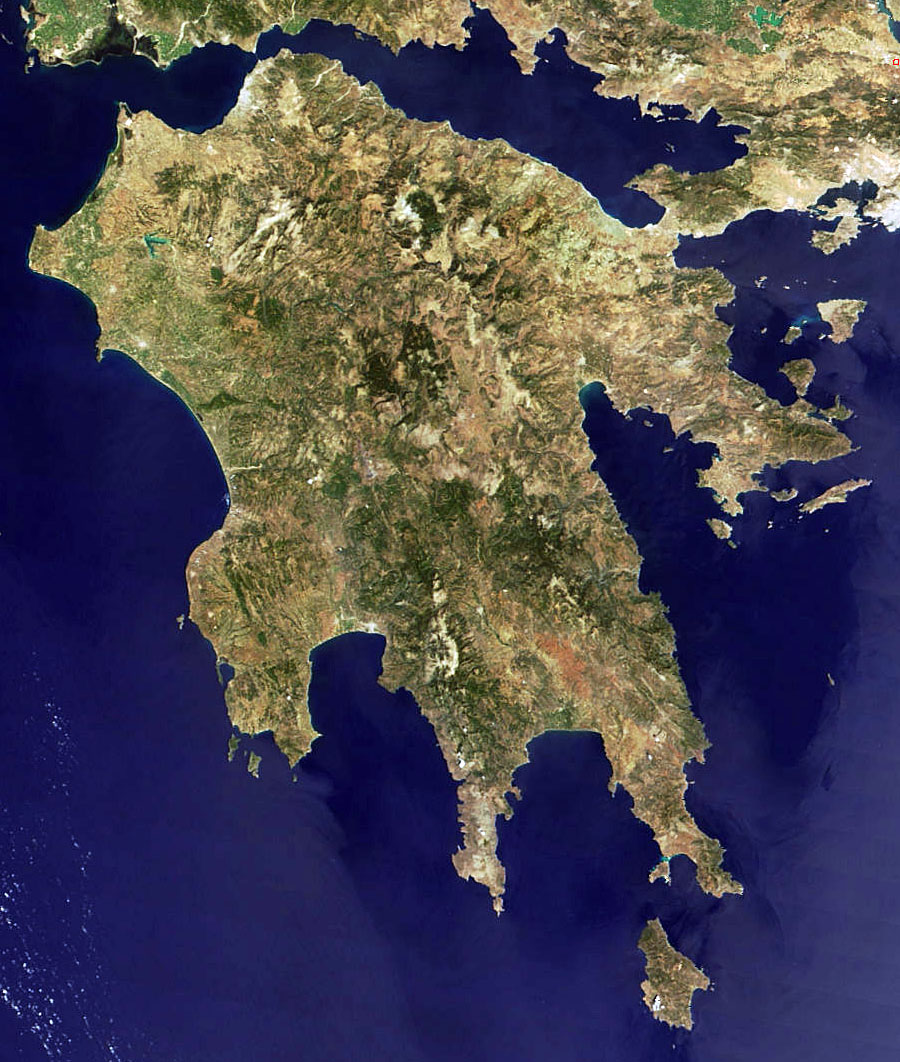
Greece (Country where Klissoura Cave 1 is located)

Klissoura Cave 1 sits in an area near the Berbadiotis river. This location has not only contributed to the cave's archaeological significance but also highlights the relationship between past Paleolithic societies and their surrounding environments through periods in history. The discoveries made at this site offer a deeper look into the changing patterns of human life, technology, and social organization over tens of thousands of years, arguably elevating the Klissoura Cave 1 as an important site for understanding the past of these Paleolithic individuals.

== Subsistence strategy ==
The Klissoura Cave 1 provides detailed record of past human life and how these Paleolithic communities' usage of resources in the area evolved over time. Records show clear evidence that these early humans shifted their hunting focus from large to tiny and more widely available animals. This indicates an archaeological significance since there must have been a variety of factors that led to increase in human population in the region. Additionally, the layers of history in the cave show a significant jump in how much the site was used, particularly moving from the Middle Paleolithic into the Upper Paleolithic period.

Lifestyle changes of Paleolithic communities residing in Klissoura Cave 1 are the first and most significant finding in recent papers. These studies highlight a significant shift from reliance on larger and time consuming subsistence strategies to more broad subsistence strategies that involve targeting a wider variety of prey, more frequently. In the article, this transition is interpreted as a response to population growth rather than any climate or environmental changes, suggesting an adaptation of their resource utilization in the area. With the diversification of their food sources, these communities that resided in and around the Klissoura Cave likely enhanced their lifestyle and food consumption despite the presumed increased population. This emphasizes the role of the Klissoura Cave 1, as it can be used to better understand the interplay between past human populations, their subsistence practices, and environmental changes throughout the Middle Paleolithic to Upper Paleolithic period in Greece.

The lifestyle changes that were found within these Paleolithic communities residing in the Klissoura Cave, is further supported by the layers in the cave or the stratigraphy. It is revealed that by examining the bones, layer by layer within the cave, researchers were able to observe a transition in hunting practices over time. This is due to the fact that initially, the cave's lower layers mainly contained bones from larger animals in the area such as deer. This suggests that early communities in and around the cave, primarily focused on hunting larger animals, which would have provided substantial amounts of food source or energy from a single item. However, as researchers moved to examining higher layers within the cave, they found an increase in bones from smaller, fast-moving animals such as hares and birds.

These findings are significant because they illustrate how the cave's Paleolithic communities adapted their subsistence strategies in response to the changing circumstances. As discussed previously, the stratigraphy or layering of the cave served as a chronological record. With bone remains in each layer providing insights into the dietary habits and adaptations of the past civilization during this time shift of Middle Paleolithic to the Upper Paleolithic period.

== Stratigraphy and site formation processes ==
From a viewpoint of stratigraphy, when looking at Klissoura Cave 1 it reveals a complex sedimentary history that significantly contributes to our understanding of the site's archaeological record. The stratigraphy of the cave displays a distinct differentiation between the Middle Paleolithic and Upper Paleolithic layers. The Middle Paleolithic layers of the cave show that many groups of people used this site extensively. This is evidenced by these layers, which can be as thick as 6.5 meters, contain a mix of hardened sediments, bones, and stone tools. At the start of the Upper Paleolithic, there is a clear break in the layers of the cave.

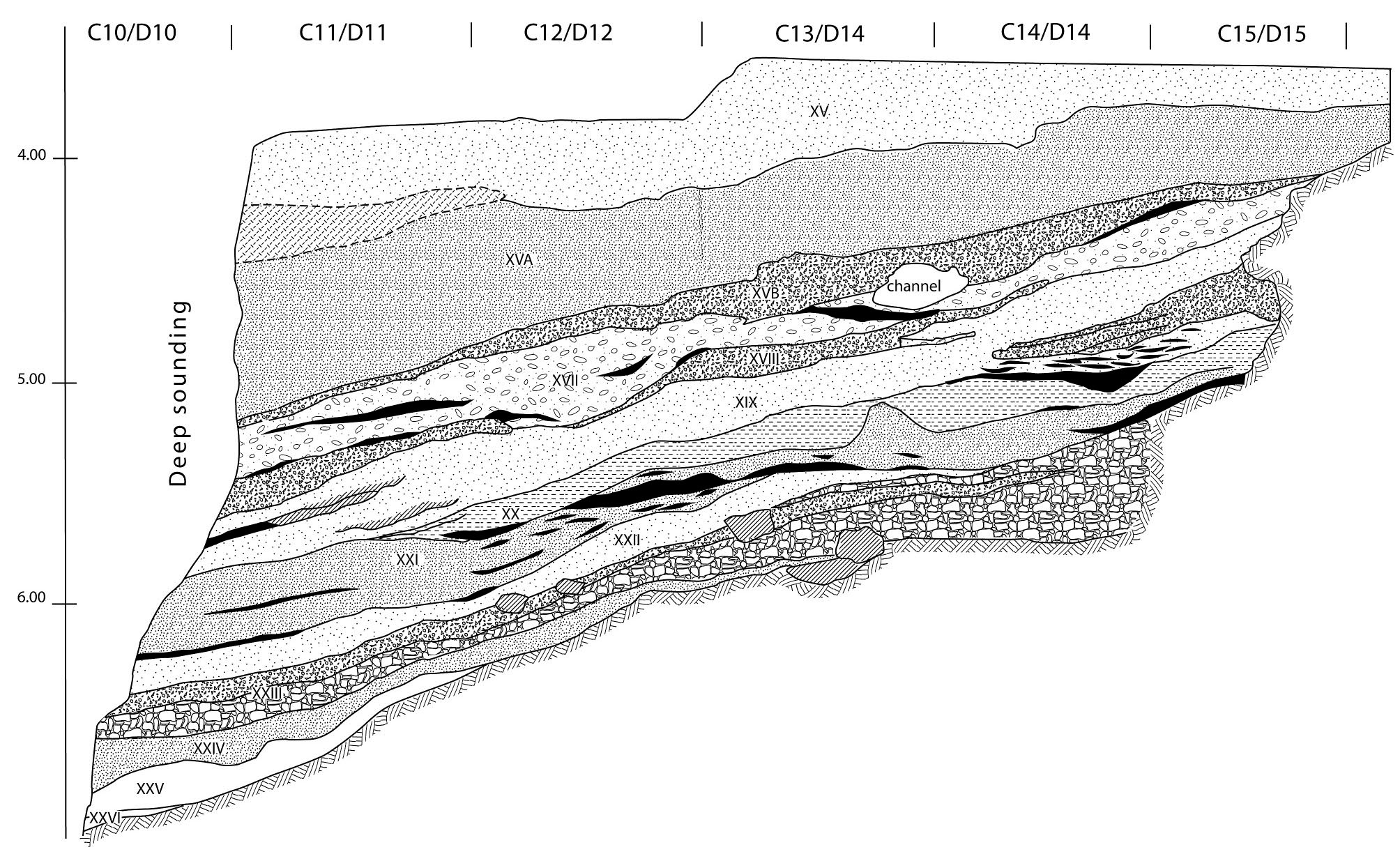
Example of Stratigraphy from Qafzeh Cave Terrace (Middle Paleolithic)

This differentiation is seen because the older Middle Paleolithic layer VII is sharply cut off by the newer Aurignacian layer IV at the back of the rockshelter. This indicates that newer layers from the Upper Paleolithic period directly cover the older ones, marking a distinct separation between the two periods. These layers from the Upper Paleolithic, are associated with Aurignacian culture, and formed by the activities of its Paloelithic inhabitants, such as the creation of clay hearths and the accumulation of ash from hearths that were cleaned out, spread around, or stepped on. Additionally, both layers of the cave also show signs of natural events like water flow and the buildup of materials washed down from nearby hills which have played an essential part in the formation of the complex layers of deposits that are seen at the site today.

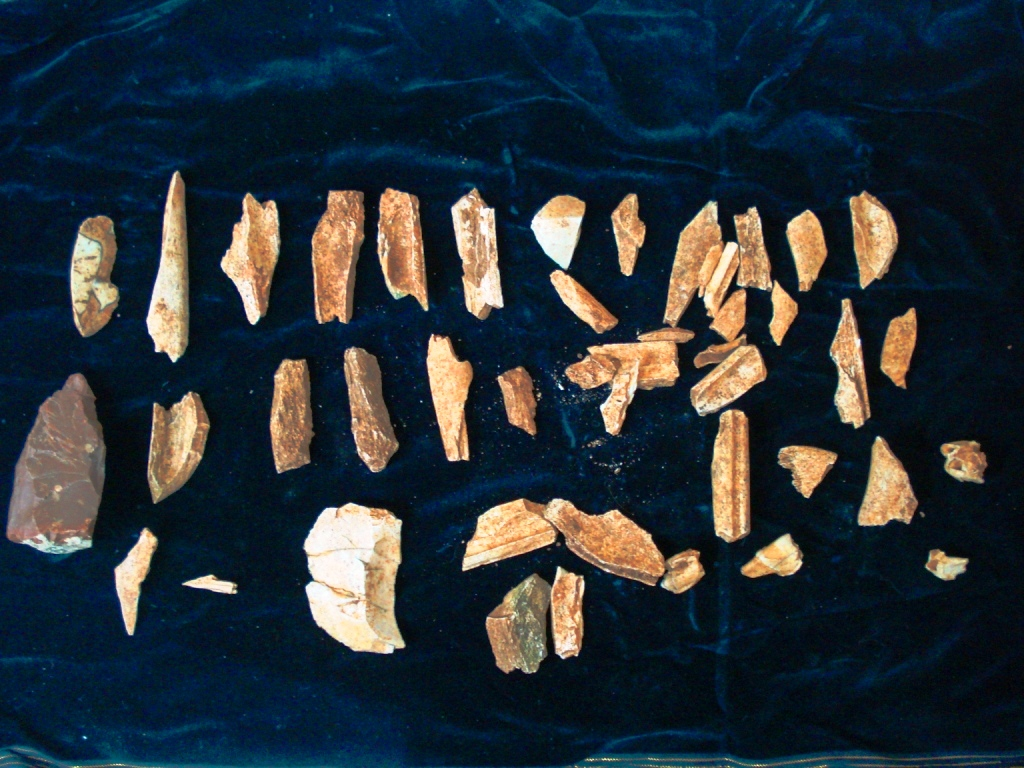
Example of Paleolithic Tools and Bones

== Material culture and lithic technology ==
The materials and lithic technology found in Klissoura Cave 1 provide insight into the practices of its Paleolithic inhabitants. Analysis of the Middle Paleolithic lithic tools shows that there is mostly a predominance of small debitage products, such as chips and flakes, alongside a wide variety of retouched tools, including scrapers and points. These findings show that the technology is marked by a blend of Levallois and non-Levallois techniques, with evidence of unidirectional and bidirectional flaking methods. This indicates a sophisticated understanding of tool-making that allowed for the production of a wide range of materials and tools for various tasks.

When moving into the Upper Paleolithic layers, there is a noticeable shift towards more specialized tool production techniques. The presence of finely crafted blades and bladelets suggests an advancement in precision and a move towards more complex activities. These tools were likely essential for new tasks or necessary in a changing environment or for quicker processing of materials. The evolution of these materials and tools from the Middle to Upper Paleolithic layers at Klissoura Cave 1 underscores a period of significant innovation that reflects responses to environmental changes and the demands of daily life for its inhabitants.
