= Kleitoria =

Kleitoria Κλειτορία
- Municipal unit
- Location within the regional unit

- Location within Greece
- Coordinates: 37°54′N 22°8′E
- Country: Greece
- Geographic region: Peloponnese
- Administrative region: West Greece
- Regional unit: Achaea
- Municipality: Kalavryta

Area
  - Municipal unit: 253.2 km^{2} (97.8 sq mi)
- Elevation: 548 m (1,798 ft)

Population (2021)
  - Municipal unit: 2,038
  - Municipal unit density: 8.049/km^{2} (20.85/sq mi)
  - Community: 670
- Time zone: UTC+2 (EET)
  - Summer (DST): UTC+3 (EEST)
- Vehicle registration: AX

Kleitoria (Greek: Κλειτορία) is a village and a municipal unit in Achaea, Peloponnese, Greece. It was also the new name of the former municipality Lefkasio, of which it was the seat, between 2008 and 2011. Since the 2011 local government reform it is part of the municipality Kalavryta, and became a municipal unit of this municipality. The municipal unit has an area of 253.221 km^{2}. The site of the ancient city of Cleitor is nearby.

== Subdivisions ==
The municipal unit Kleitoria is subdivided into the following communities (constituent villages in brackets):

- Agios Nikolaos
- Ano Kleitoria
- Armpounas (Armpounas, Kalamaki)
- Drymos (Drymos, Kato Drymos)
- Filia (Filia, Agioi Theodoroi, Kalyvia, Zevgolatio)
- Glastra (Agios Vlasios, Glastra)
- Kastelli
- Kastria
- Kleitor
- Kleitoria (Kleitoria, Valtos, Elatofyto, Zarelia, Kallithea)
- Krinofyta
- Lefkasio
- Lykouria (Lykouria, Kerasia, Spilia)
- Pankrati (Pankrati, Pankrataiika Kalyvia, Sella, Steno)
- Planitero
- Tourlada

== Transportation ==
The historic EO111, which ran between Tripoli and Lygies (south of Patras) from 1928 to 1955, used to pass through Kleitoria, Ano Kleitoria and Kastelli.

== Historical population ==
| Year | Community | Municipal unit |
|---|---|---|
| 1981 | 1148 | - |
| 1991 | 912 | - |
| 2001 | 975 | 3,892 |
| 2011 | 713 | 2,360 |
| 2021 | 670 | 2,038 |
