= Lefkasio =

Lefkasio Λευκάσιο
- Community
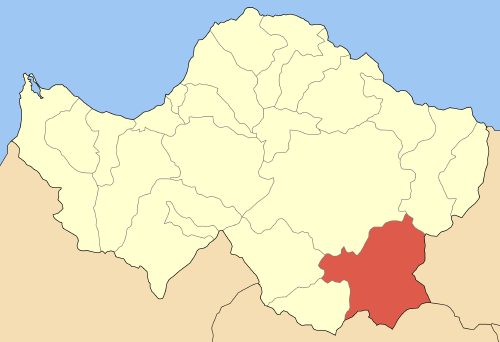
- Location within Achaea

- Location within Greece
- Coordinates: 37°53′N 22°7′E
- Country: Greece
- Administrative region: West Greece
- Regional unit: Achaea
- Municipality: Kalavryta
- Municipal unit: Kleitoria
- Elevation: 548 m (1,798 ft)

Population (2021)
  - Community: 82
- Time zone: UTC+2 (EET)
  - Summer (DST): UTC+3 (EEST)
- Postal code: 250 07
- Area code: 26920
- Vehicle registration: ΑΧ

Lefkasio (Greek: Λευκάσιο) is a village and a former municipality in Achaea, West Greece, Greece. The municipality was renamed to Kleitoria in 2008, and in 2011 it became part of the municipality Kalavryta.

== Historical population ==
Year	Community
2001	132
2011	89
2021	82

== See also ==
- List of settlements in Achaea
