= Voidomatis =

River in northwestern Greece

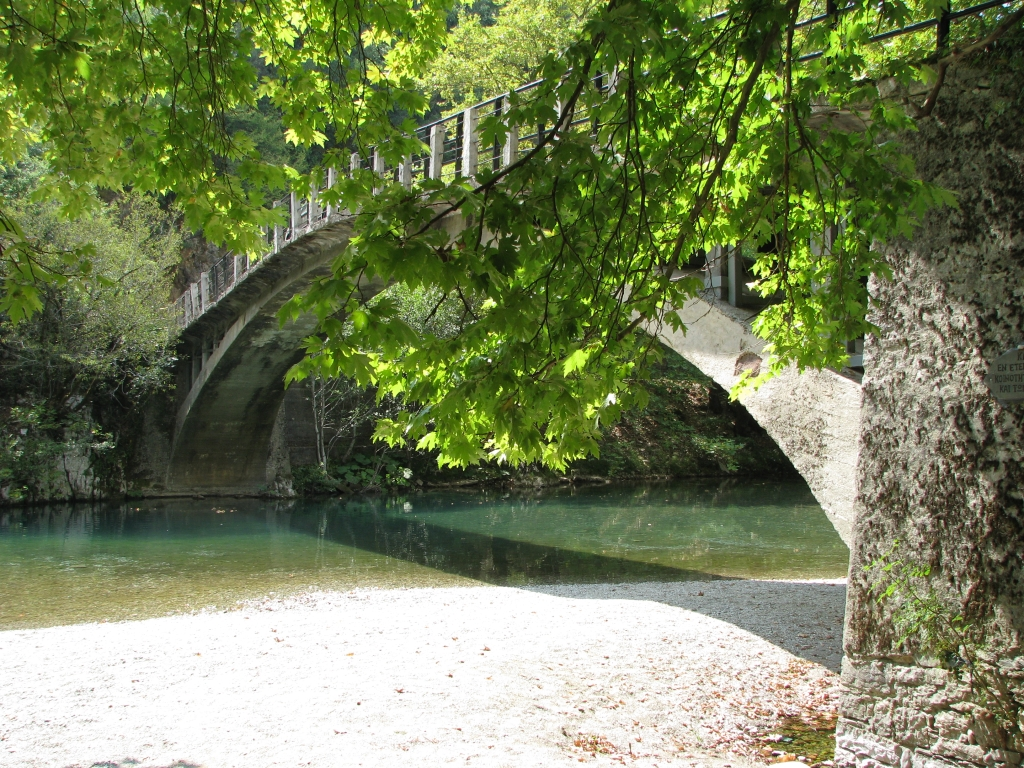
- Aristi Bridge on the Voidomatis
- Native name: Βοϊδομάτης (Greek)

Location
- Country: Greece

Physical characteristics
- Mouth
  - location: Aoös
  - coordinates: 40.0136°N 20.6445°E

Basin features
- Progression: Vjosë→ Adriatic Sea

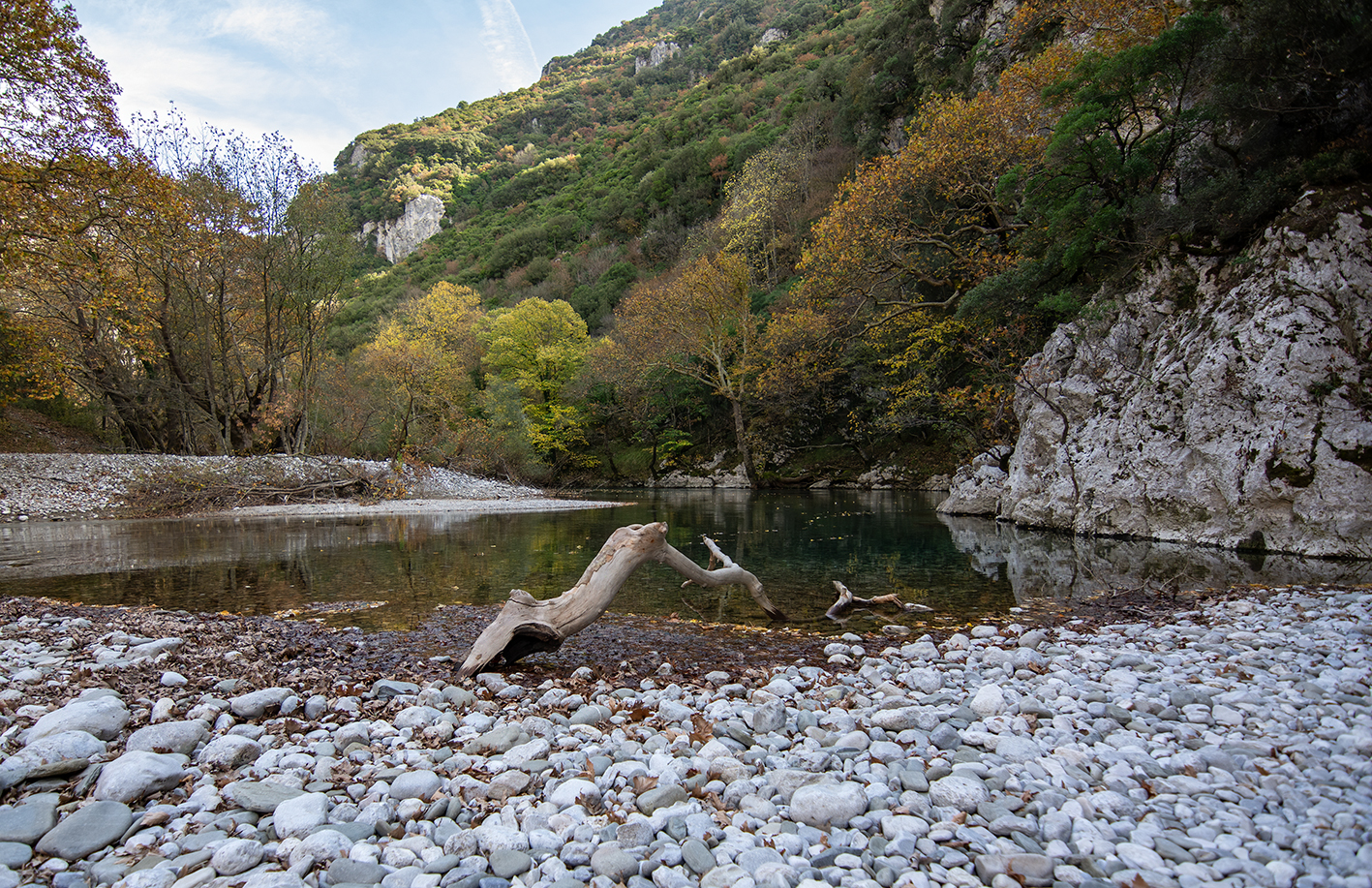
Voidomatis river

The Voidomatis (Greek: Βοϊδομάτης) is a river in the Ioannina regional unit in northwestern Greece, and is a tributary of the Aoös river.

== General description ==
The main current sources are located in the village of Vikos. Along its path it converges with other streams originating from the banks of Tymfi or the Vikos Gorge. It ends close to Konitsa. The river has a total length of 15 kilometres. The name Voidomatis (meaning "the eye of the ox"), derives from the fact that oxen have clear blue eyes, like the waters of this river.

The Voidomatis has been characterized as one of the cleanest rivers in Europe as it does not face any environmental issues. It crosses one of the most beautiful natural locations in Greece and has been part of the Vikos–Aoös National Park since 1973. The river is spanned by a number of stone bridges, the most famous being the Kledonas Bridge. The river is known for water sports such as rafting and kayaking.

== Geomorphology ==
The Voidomatis is mostly seasonal, with year-round flow. The average temperature of the water does not exceed 4 °C.

== Archaeology ==
Archaeological excavations were undertaken at Kleidi Cave just above the Voidomatis by a British team between 1983 and 1986. The excavations revealed the cave that contained artefacts, stone tools, faunal remains and other fossils, that were dated back to the Palaeolithic and the Epigravettian culture between 20,000 and 12,000 years ago. Analogous discoveries were made by the same research team in the neighbouring Megalakkos cave.
