= Panos Ioannou =

Panayiotis "Panos" Ioannou (Greek: Παναγιώτης (Πάνος) Ιωάννου; 26 January 1951 – 18 April 2005) was an internationally known cell biologist and neuroscientist who pioneered in research on Thalassemia. He was born in Kalograia, in the Kyrenia District of Cyprus on 26 January 1951. He died on 18 April 2005 in Melbourne, Australia at the age of 54. In 1966 after the death of his younger brother from Hodgkin's disease he and his family moved to London, United Kingdom.

Panayiotis Ioannou received both his B.Sc. and his Ph.D. in biochemistry from University College, London, with a focus on the molecular mechanisms of memory laydown. His fascination with the mechanism of DNA replication also led him to publish a model for this mechanism in Nature while still a student. Ioannou set up and ran for almost 15 years the Prenatal Diagnosis for Thalassaemia in Cyprus, followed by the setting up of the Department of Molecular Genetics in the Cyprus Institute of Neurology and Genetics. He had held fellowships from various organizations, including WHO and UNESCO. In the course of a UNESCO fellowship in 1992 at Lawrence Livermore National Laboratory, he created the first human PAC genomic library, which has been used extensively for the sequencing of the human genome. In 1997 Ioannou moved to the Murdoch Children’s Research Institute, Melbourne, Australia, where he led the Cell and Gene Therapy (CAGT) Research Group. He concentrated on the development of novel therapies with intact genomic loci for haematological and neurological disorders, while similar approaches may have major implications in biotechnology and the biological emancipation of the human species.

The Murdoch Children’s Research Institute, in Melbourne, Australia, has established the ‘Panos Ioannou Fellowship’ in his memory. Jim Vadolas was awarded the Panos Ioannou Fellowship for 2006.

Shireen Lamande was awarded the Panos Ioannou Travelling Fellowship in 2007.

The Cyprus Institute of Neurology and Genetics has established a Young Scientist Award in his memory. Maria A. Loizidou received the award in 2009.
