= Cave of the Lakes =

Cave in Achaea, Greece

- Location within Greece
- Location: Kastria, Kalavryta, Achaea, Greece
- Coordinates: 38°2′N 22°7′E
- Elevation: 827
- Discovery: 1964
- Entrances: 1
- Access: Public
- Show cave length: 1980
- Lighting: Yes
- Visitors: Yes
- Features: Lakes, stalactites and stalagmites
- Website: http://www.kastriacave.gr/

The Cave of the Lakes (Greek: Σπήλαιο των Λιμνών, romanized: Spilaio ton Limnon), formerly called Troupisio, is located near the village Kastria in the municipality of Kalavryta, Achaea regional unit. It is 17 km (11 miles) from Kalavryta and 9 km (6 miles) from Kleitoria.

The cave is an old subterranean river consisting of three levels. During the winter when the snow melts it is transformed into a flowing river with waterfalls. During the summer, it dries up, leaving behind 13 lakes.

== Legend ==
It is mentioned in the writings of the ancient traveller Pausanias.

According to Greek legend, it was in this cave that Melampus cured two of the three daughters of Proetus, king of Tiryns, Lysippe and Iphianassa. The third daughter, Iphinoe, had died on the way.

== Scientific ==
Humans started using the cave during the Neolithic Age and it was in continued use throughout the duration of the Bronze Age. It presents significant paleontological and archaeological interests. On the lower level of the cave, fossilized bones of humans and various other animals, including hippopotamus, have been identified.
