= Panos Antsaklis =

American engineer

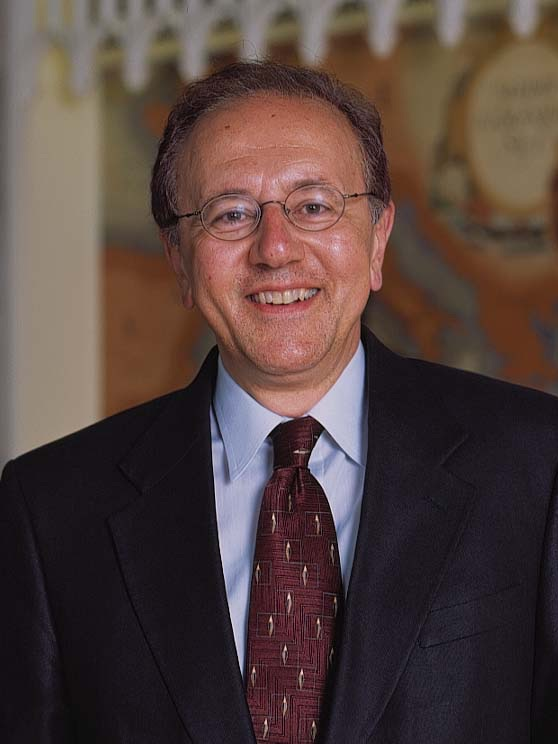
- Portrait of Antsaklis
- Occupation: Engineer
- Website: https://www3.nd.edu/~pantsakl/

Panos Antsaklis is the H. Clifford and Evelyn A. Brosey Professor of Electrical Engineering at the University of Notre Dame and also Concurrent Professor in the Departments of Computer Science and Engineering and of Applied and Computational Mathematics and Statistics. He is a graduate of the National Technical University of Athens, Greece, and holds MS and PhD (1977) degrees from Brown University.

His research focuses on Cyber Physical Networked Embedded Systems and addresses systems, control and automation problems in the interdisciplinary research area of Control, Computing and Communication Networks. This research examines ways to design engineering systems that will exhibit high degrees of autonomy in performing useful tasks. High autonomy and ways to achieve it has been the driving force and the central theme of his research on the control of complex systems. Application areas include transportation, power, manufacturing, and chemical process systems, as well as computer and communication networks. His work includes analysis of behavior and control strategies for complex autonomous, intelligent, learning and reconfigurable systems. It is based on mathematical and data models of continuous, hybrid and discrete event dynamical systems. His recent work on a general theory for the analysis and robust design of Cyber-Physical Systems uses the energy-like concepts of passivity (passivity indices) and dissipativity.

== Publications ==
Overall, Antsaklis has 600 publications in journals, books and conference proceedings that have been cited over 30,000 times. He has co-authored three graduate textbooks on Hybrid and Linear Systems, three research monographs on Networked and Discrete Event Dynamical Systems and has co-edited six books on Intelligent Autonomous Control, Hybrid Systems and Networked Embedded Control Systems. Additionally, he has supervised numerous successful PhD students.

=== Graduate Textbooks ===
- Hybrid Dynamical Systems: Fundamentals and Methods (Springer 2021; with Hai Lin)
- A Linear Systems Primer (Springer 2007; with A.N. Michel)
- Linear Systems (Springer 2006; with A.N. Michel)

=== Research Monographs ===
- Model-Based Control of Networked Systems (Springer 2014; with E. Garcia and L. Montestruque)
- Supervisory Control of Concurrent Systems: A Petri Net Structural Approach (Springer 2006; with M.V. Iordache)
- Supervisory Control of Discrete Event Systems using Petri Nets (Springer 1998; with J.O. Moody)

=== Edited books ===
- Networked Embedded Sensing and Control (Springer 2006; with P. Tabuada).
- Stability and Control of Dynamical Systems with Applications: A Tribute to Anthony N. Michel (Birkhauser 2003; with D. Liu).
- Hybrid Systems V (Springer-Verlag 1999; with W. Kohn, M. Lemmon, A. Nerode and S. Sastry).
- Hybrid Systems IV (Springer-Verlag 1997; with W. Kohn, A. Nerode and S. Sastry).
- Hybrid Systems II (Springer-Verlag 1995; with W. Kohn, A. Nerode and S. Sastry).
- An Introduction to Intelligent and Autonomous Control (Kluwer 1993; with K.M.Passino).

== Recognitions ==
He is the 2006 recipient of the Engineering Alumni Medal of Brown University, recipient of the IEEE third Millennium Medal in 2000, and holds an Honorary Doctorate from the University of Lorraine in France, 2012.

At the University of Notre Dame he is the recipient of several teaching awards, including the 2013 Faculty Award and the 2020 Research Achievement Award. He is also the first Notre Dame faculty member to have been granted both of these notable awards.

He is IEEE, IFAC and AAAS Fellow,

- Fellow of the American Association for the Advancement of Science (AAAS) 2011. Citation reads: For distinguished contributions to the field of Systems and Control, particularly for feedback control of multi-variable systems, intelligent, hybrid and discrete event system.
- Fellow of the International Federation of Automatic Control (IFAC) 2010. Citation reads: For fundamental contributions to hybrid control systems, supervisory control of discrete event systems, control of systems over networks and for leadership in the profession.
- Fellow of the Institute of Electrical and Electronics Engineers (IEEE) 1991. Citation reads: For contributions to the theory of feedback stabilization and control of linear multivariable systems.

He is the President of the Mediterranean Control Association, the parent organization of the MED control conferences. He has served as the Chair of the Scientific Advisory Board (Fachbeirat) of the Max-Planck-Institut fur Dynamik Komplexer Technischer Systeme, Magdeburg, Germany, as member of the President’s Council of Advisors for Science and Technology (PCAST) subcommittee on Networking and Information Technology and he delivered the Science Keynote Address at the 2012 NSF Cyber-Physical Systems PI Meeting. He served as the 1997 President of the IEEE Control Systems Society and he was the Editor-in-Chief of the IEEE Transactions on Automatic Control for 8 years, from January 2010 to December 2017.
