= Panos Paparrigopoulos =

Greek poet and writer

Panos Paparrigopoulos (Greek: Πάνος Παπαρρηγόπουλος, 1913 – 1985) was a Greek poet and writer. He was born in Filia in southern Achaia, now a prefecture. He studied law and later entered the police in which he was promoted to the rank of Police Director. He worked with many periodicals and newspapers.

== Works ==
=== Poetry books ===
Title	Greek transliteration	English name
Nostalgikoi Rythmoi, 1964	Νοσταλγικοί Ρυθμοί	Nostalgic Rhythms
To Tragoudi tou Ladona, 1967	Το Τραγούδι του Λάδωνα	The Song of Ladon
Liriki Poreia, 1971	Λυρική Πορεία	Lyric Course
Epilogi, 1981	Επιλογή	Selection

=== Others ===
Title	Greek transliteration	English name
Laografika ton Kalavryton, 1970 – 2nd ed. 1979	Λαογραφικά των Καλαβρύτων	Folklore of Kalavryta
Kalavrytina Dimotika Tragoudia, 1971	Καλαβρυτινά Δημοτικά Τραγούδια	Folk Songs of Kalavryta
Pera apo tin Politeia, 1972	Πέρα από την Πολιτεία	Beyond the City
