= Kleidi Cave =

Cave and archaeological site in Greece

- Σπήλαιο Κλειδί (Greek)
- location in Greece
- 39°58′51″N 20°40′2″E
- Location: north of Kleidonia
- Region: Ioannina regional unit, northwestern Greece

Klithi or Kleidi Cave (Greek: Σπήλαιο Κλειδί, Spelaio Kleidi) is located to the north of the village of Kleidonia in the Ioannina regional unit and around 500 m (1,600 ft) west of the Megalakkos Cave, northwestern Greece. It is situated atop the northern bank of the Voidomatis river valley.

== Archaeology ==
Archaeological excavations that were undertaken by a British team between 1983 and 1986 revealed the cave that contained artefacts, stone tools, faunal remains and other fossils, that were dated back to the Paleolithic and the Epigravettian culture between 20,000 and 12,000 years ago. Analogous discoveries were made by the same research team in the neighbouring Megalakkos cave.
