= Lefka Ori =

Mountain range in Crete, Greece

- Páchnes
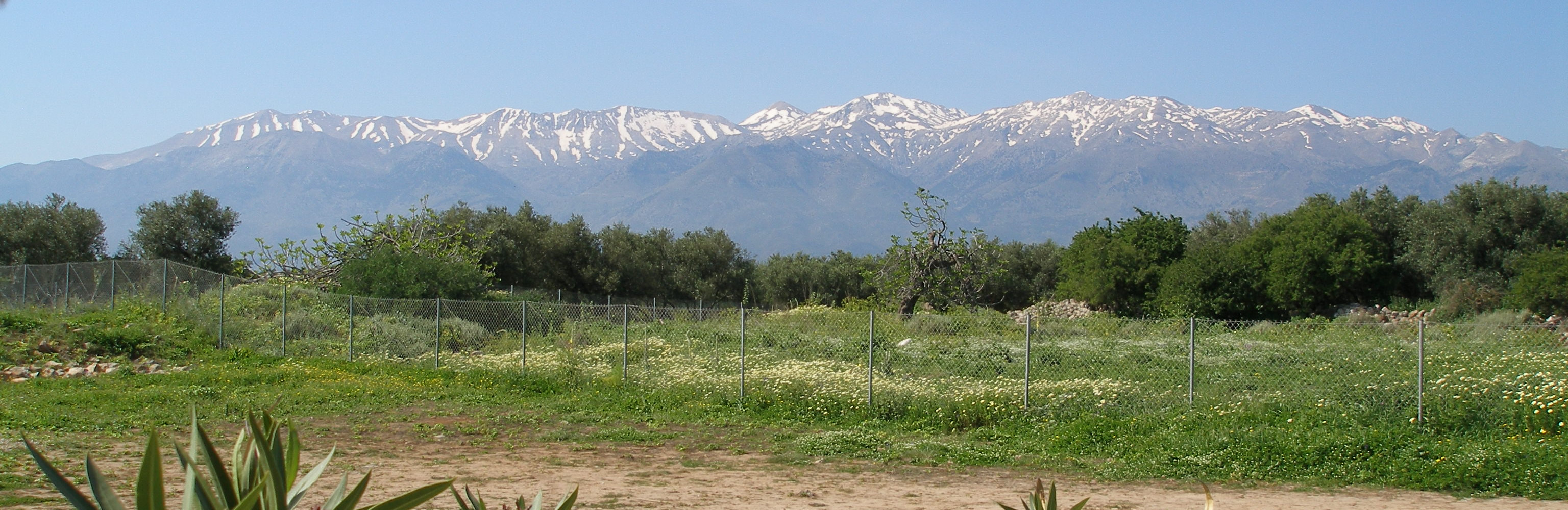
- Lefka Ori ("White Mountains") view from the north

Highest point
- Elevation: 2,453 m (8,048 ft)
- Prominence: 2,038 m (6,686 ft)
- Listing: Ultra
- Coordinates: 35°17′34″N 24°02′00″E

Geography
- Location within Greece
- Location: Crete, Greece

Climbing
- Easiest route: Long but easy walk

Lefka Ori (Greek: Λευκά Όρη, meaning 'White Mountains') or Madares (Μαδάρες from the Cretan Greek μαδαρός meaning 'without coverage, bald, bare of any vegetation for high mountain areas') is a mountain range located in Western Crete, in the Chania prefecture. The White Mountains or Lefka Ori occupy a large part of the centre of West Crete and are the main feature of the region. They consist mainly of limestone, from light grey to bluish or black color. The White Mountains have taken their name from the perpetual white or off-white color of their peaks as the off white of limestone during the summer and fall interchanges with the snow that covers the peaks until late in spring.

The highest summit is Pachnes at 2,453 m (8,048 ft) and there are over 30 summits that are over 2,000 m (6,562 ft) high. The Lefka Ori also have about 50 gorges, the most famous being the Samaria Gorge. Another characteristic of the mountain range is that there are a number of plateaus that exist at heights of 500–1,100 metres (1,640–3,609 ft), such at those of Askifou, Impros, Kallikratis, Anopolis, and Omalos, which are all surrounded by mountains.

Pachnes (from Greek πάχνη which means 'morning dew' but also in Cretan it can mean 'fog') is the second tallest peak in Crete, after Mount Ida, which is also known as Psiloritis (from the Greek Ψηλός which means 'high, tall' and from the Greek όρος for 'mountain', i.e. 'tall mountain') and the 10th in Greece.

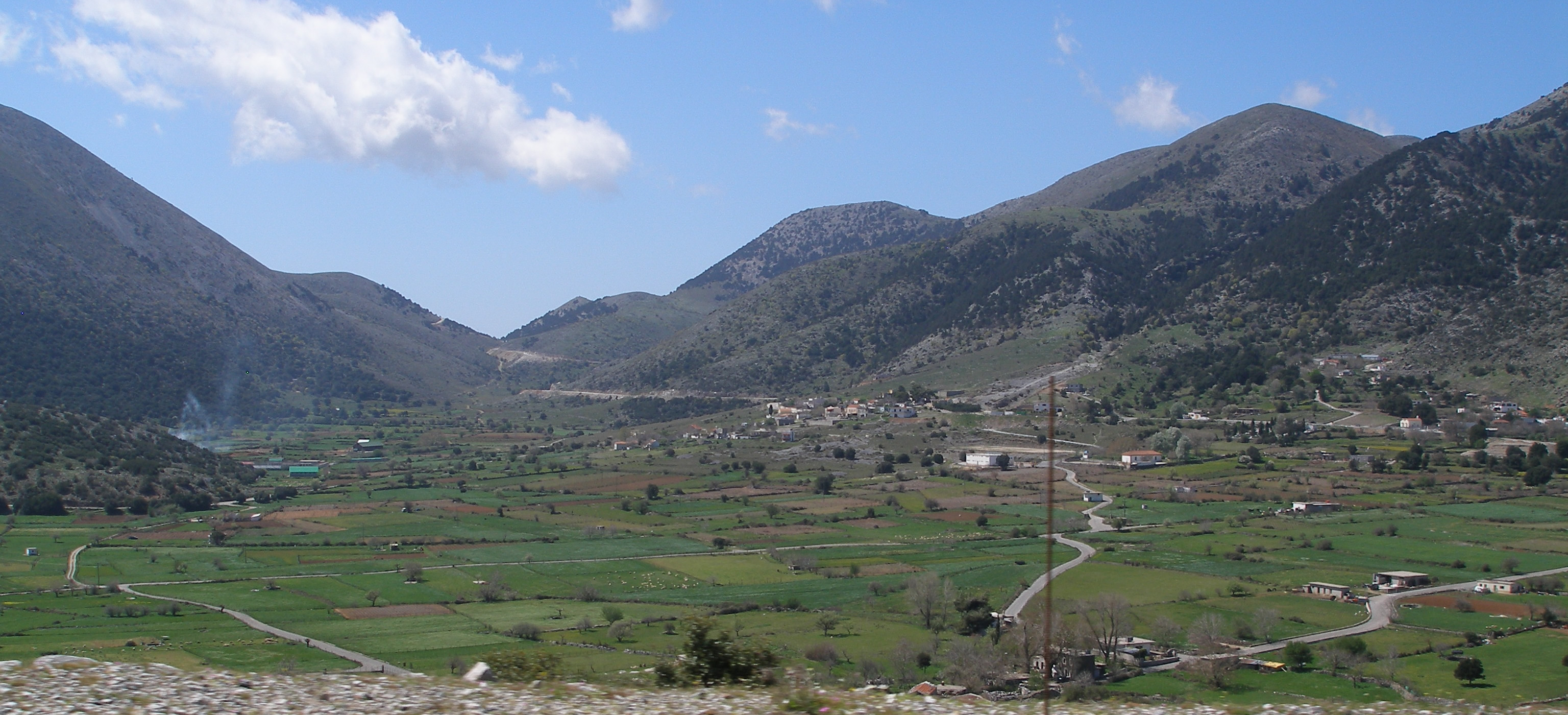
The plateau of Askifou

There are only a few main roads leading into the White Mountains. From the north the roads to Omalos and the entrance of the Samaria Gorge and the road to Chora Sfakion through the plateau of Askifou further to the east. There are other approaches from the west from Sougia and Paleochora leading to Omalos as well as approaches from northeast from Argyroupoli – Asi Ghonia and from Plakias-Frangokastello along the southern coast in the east. There are also a few other minor roads leading to higher elevations.

The central and southern parts of the Lefka Ori lie at an elevation of 1,800 m (5,906 ft) and above resembles a moon landscape. This is technically called a high desert. It is unique in the northern hemisphere. The prominence of the Lefka Ori range can be seen in the aerial footage below of the Hania province from space [1]:

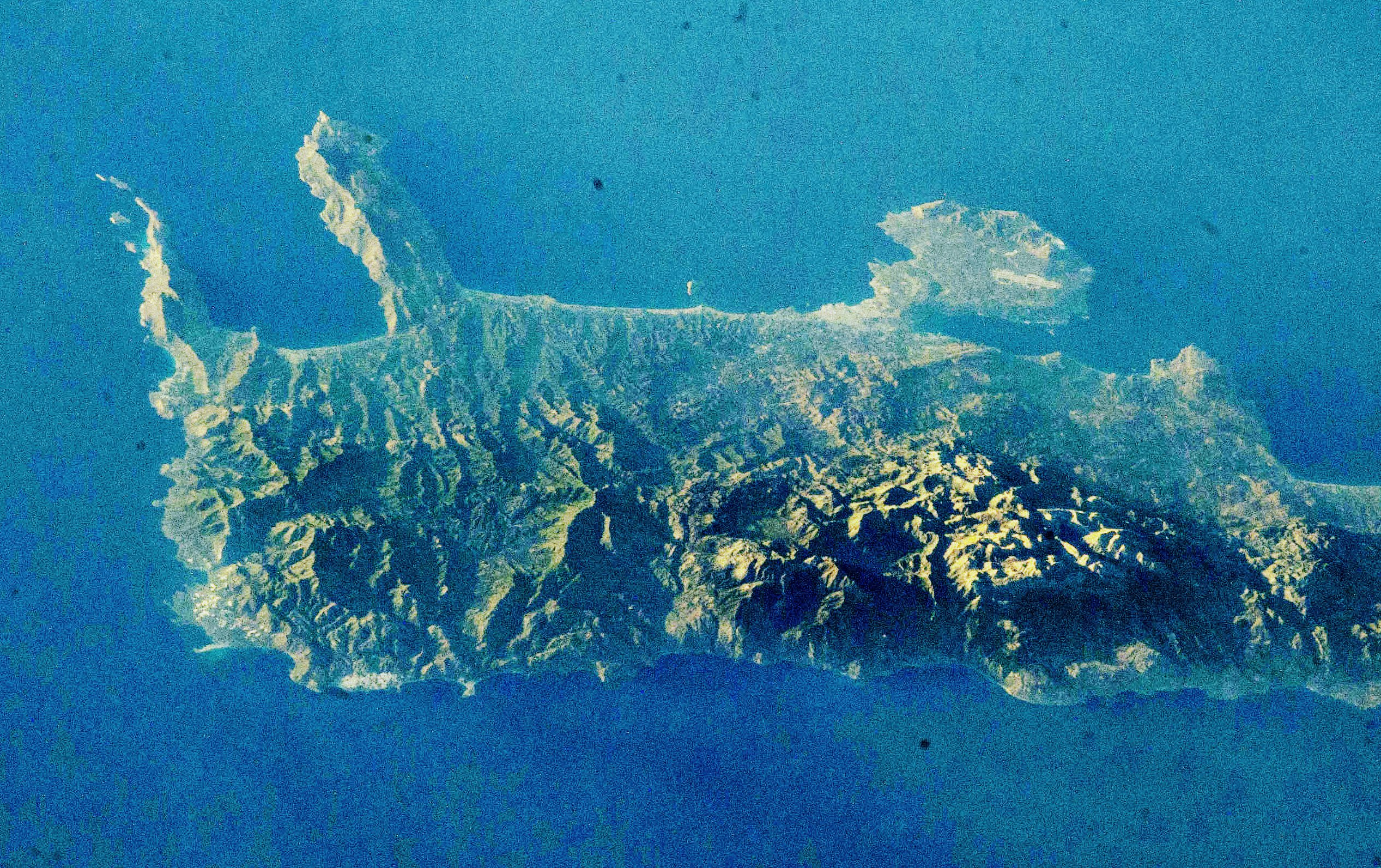
Original Photo Source courtesy of Earth Science and Remote Sensing Unit, NASA Johnson Space Center

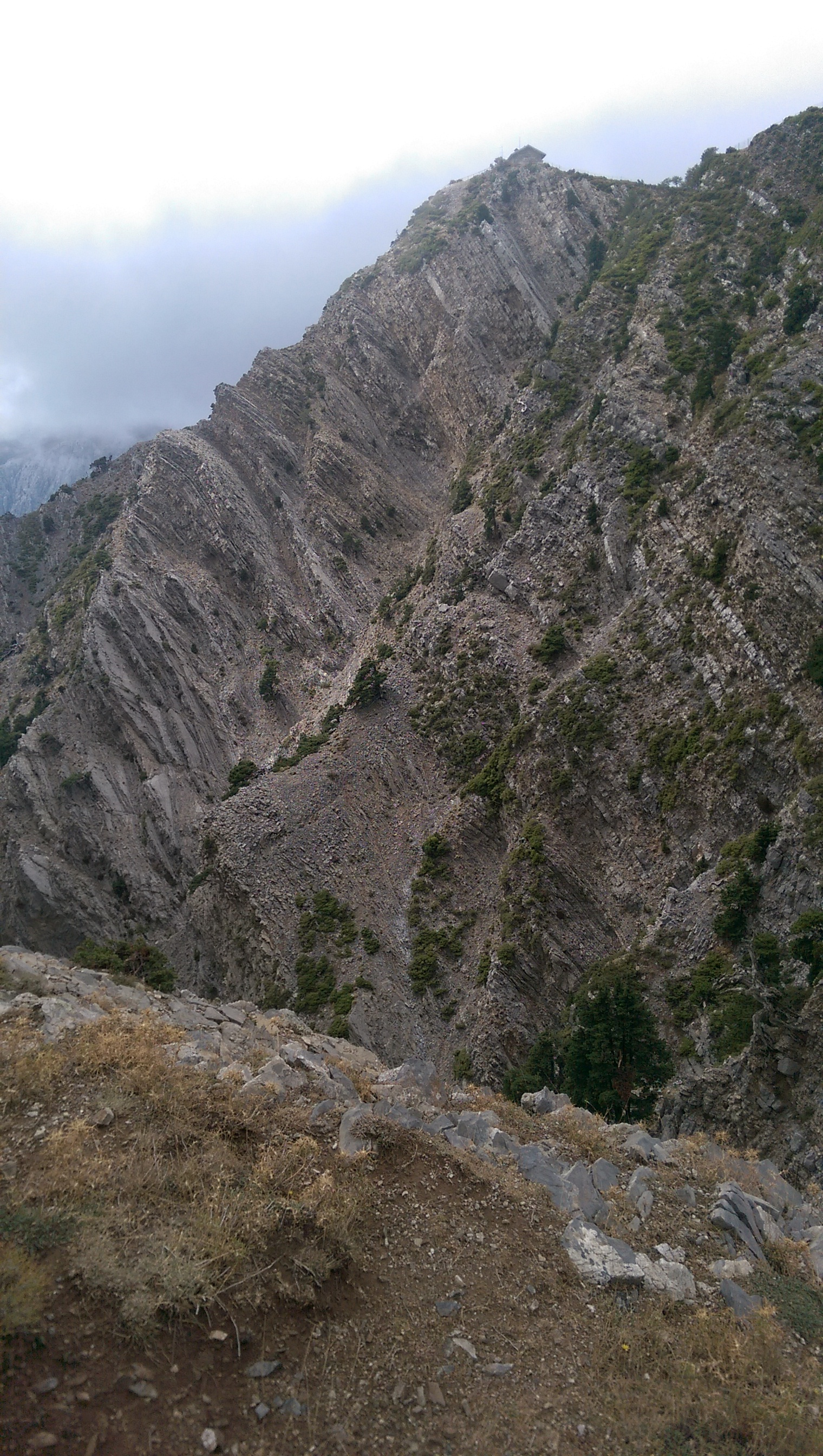
Kallergi Refuge

There are four refuges in Lefka Ori. The Volikas Refuge was built in 1958. It is located above the village Kampi Keramion, at an elevation of 1,450 metres (4,757 ft). It can accommodate up to 30 persons. The Kallergi Refuge was built in 1970. Its elevation is 1,650 m (5,413 ft) and it can accommodate 45 persons. It is located 5 km (3.1 mi) from Omalos. The Tavris Refuge was built in 1992 and it is located near Ammoudari, 7.5 km (4.7 mi) from Askyfou, at 1,200 metres (3,937 ft). It can accommodate up to 45 persons. The Svourichti Refuge was built in 1994. It is located seven hours from Anopolis at 1,980 m (6,496 ft) and it can accommodate 20 persons.

The Lefka Ori has a rich history as a hiding place for rebels during Cretan uprisings against the Venetian and Ottoman rulers, as well as during German Occupation (1941–1945).

The Lefka Ori are home to both of Greece's caves with depths greater than one kilometer, Gourgouthakas and the Cave of the Lion.
