= Pano Logic =

American information technology company

Pano Logic, Inc.
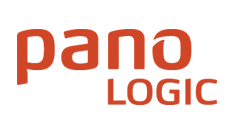
- Type: Private
- Industry: Computer software
- Founded: California, 2006
- Headquarters: Redwood City, California, USA
- Key people: John Kish, Aly Orady, Jeff Page, Dana Loof
- Products: Pano System 5.0; Pano Express
- Owners: Foundation Capital, Goldman Sachs, Mayfield Fund
- Number of employees: 50
- Website: http://www.panologic.com/

Pano Logic was a manufacturer of devices which present virtual desktops to the end user with no local processing power (a contrast with thin client technologies). They describe this concept as "zero client". This is perceived as offering benefits in end-user support and in power provision to desks. OEM versions have been included in displays from some vendors, allowing a single unit to be deployed. The company failed in October 2012. In March 2013, Propalms announced they had acquired the rights to support Panologic customers, and will "help transition the customer base to a new platform".

== Products ==
Pano Logic devices support both VMware and Microsoft's Hyper-V hypervisors as well as the Windows XP and Windows 7 operating systems, support for which was launched in April 2010 with the release of Pano System 3.0.

Pano Logic also introduced in May 2010 the Pano Express, a pre-loaded, pre-configured 50-user suite combining VMware vSphere Essentials, Microsoft Windows 7 licenses, and server and storage hardware with Pano Logic’s 3.0 zero client platform.

The Pano Logic platform has three main components. The software components are Pano Manager and Pano Direct Service. The hardware bit is the Pano Zero Client (sometimes called the Pano Device). Pano Logic offers an additional accessory, the Pano Remote. This is an encrypted token-like device which allows remote users to access their virtual PCs from a PC The Pano System uses Pano Direct Technology, including the Pano Direct Protocol—a UDP-based low-level bus-extension protocol—to provide a remote Windows desktop experience across a local area network (LAN). Pano states that this provides better computer performance than commonly using protocols originally developed for terminal services such RDP and ICA. The Pano System runs desktop virtual machines on centralized servers using a bare-metal hypervisor, or virtual machine management layer, from VMware's vSphere or VI3 suites - specifically VMware ESX Server and ESXi 3.x or later.

Pano Manager Pano Manager is the central management component of the architecture. It discovers and controls Pano devices, manages the VMware virtual infrastructure, connects assigned users to their virtual desktops and monitors status of user sessions, taking corrective action when necessary. Pano Manager provides a management layer that also connects underlying optional management tools, such as VMware's vCenter Server (formerly VMware Virtual Center, part of their VMware Virtual Infrastructure product suite), and security and authentication directories such as OpenLDAP, Novell eDirectory, and Microsoft Active Directory.

Pano DAS Pano Direct Service, or Pano DAS (formerly Pano Desktop Service), is a lightweight Windows service that resides in each desktop virtual machine operating system instance and which links peripherals attached to the stateless Pano Device to the unmodified Windows drivers installed in the virtual machine OS. The Pano DAS provides low-level driver support for display, input/output, and USB peripherals, ultimately enabling control of the OS from the Pano Device. Pano DAS also allows the use of native Windows drivers for most forms of USB peripherals.

The Pano Zero Client The Pano Zero Client is a 3.5" × 3.5" × 2" silver or black cube that supports the Pano System and delivers computing to the end user. The device provides I/O connections to USB peripherals including keyboards and mice along with a DVI connection for displays. (An older model was VGA-only). It also has audio in and out connections. The Pano Device draws about 3.5 watts of power when running—compared to around 70 watts consumed by an average desktop PC when in idle mode. Its small size allows it to be mounted directly behind a LCD monitor with an optional VESA mount.

Pano Remote Pano Remote was released in April 2009 and provides a way for users of Pano virtual desktops to access their virtual desktop from any location, requiring only a Windows XP or Vista computer with an available USB port. Pano Remote is delivered as a secure USB key loaded with the preconfigured Pano Remote software. Pano Remote does not require the use of VPN software or hardware, but instead uses standard secure protocols (RDP via HTTPS/Secure Sockets Layer) to connect to a bundled component called Pano Gateway running on a Microsoft Windows Server 2008 Terminal Server Gateway server, simplifying the configuration of firewalls and security policies.

== Shutdown and acquisition ==
Pano Logic quietly shut down operations in 2012 and then was acquired by ProPalms in 2013. In 2016, ProPalms changed its name to Thinspace.

== See also ==
- Comparison of platform virtualization software
- Desktop virtualization
- Virtual appliance
- Virtual machine
- x86 virtualization
