= Lycuria =

Coordinates: 37°50′16″N 22°11′04″E

Lycuria or Lykouria (Ancient Greek: Λυκουρία) was a village in ancient Arcadia, which marked the boundaries of the Pheneatae, and Cleitorii.

Its site is tentatively located near the modern Lykouria, which was renamed to reflect association with the ancient town.
