= Caryae =

Town of ancient Laconia

Coordinates: 37°19′51″N 22°26′38″E

Caryae or Karyai (Ancient Greek: Καρύαι) was a town of ancient Laconia upon the frontiers of Arcadia. It was originally an Arcadian town belonging to Tegea, but was conquered by the Spartans and annexed to their territory. Caryae revolted from Sparta after the Battle of Leuctra (371 BCE), and offered to guide a Theban army into Laconia; but shortly afterwards it was severely punished for its treachery, for Archidamus III took the town and put to death all the inhabitants who were made prisoners.

Caryae was celebrated for its temple of Artemis Caryatis, and for the annual festival of this goddess, at which the Lacedaemonian virgins used to perform a peculiar kind of dance. This festival was of great antiquity, for in the Second Messenian War, Aristomenes is said to have carried off the Lacedaemonian virgins, who were dancing at Caryae in honour of Artemis. It was, perhaps, from this ancient dance of the Lacedaemonian maidens, that the Greek artists gave the name of Caryatid to the female figures which were employed in architecture instead of pillars. The tale of Vitruvius respecting the origin of these figures, is not entitled to any credit. He relates that Caryae revolted to the Persians after the Battle of Thermopylae; that it was in consequence destroyed by the allied Greeks, who killed the men and led the women into captivity; and that to commemorate the disgrace of the latter, representations of them were employed in architecture instead of columns.

The exact position of Caryae has given rise to dispute. It is evident from the account of Pausanias, and from the history of more than one campaign that it was situated on the road from Tegea to Sparta. Modern scholars place its site near the modern Karyes, formerly Arachova, but renamed to reflect association with the ancient town.
