= Joseph Stephanini =

- Born: 1803; Arta, Ottoman Empire
- Died: 19th Century
- Occupation: Writer
- Known for: Runaway Slave, Author

Joseph Stephanini (Greek: Ιωσήφ Στεφανίνις; 1803–?) was an Ottoman Greek author and runaway slave who migrated to the United States. He wrote The Personal Narrative of the Sufferings of J. Stephanini pleading to the American people to raise money to free his family from the bondage of slavery. The book circulated in the United States in the early 1830s, informing Americans of the horrors of Ottoman slavery. Stephanini's efforts in part started The Greek Slave Movement, which in part helped build momentum for American abolitionists. The most notable artistic product of the Greek Slave Movement was The Greek Slave statue by Hiram Powers.

== Early life ==
Stephanini was born in Arta to Ioannis and Chrissavi Themiano. They were married at fourteen years old. They had seven children: Joseph, Spiro, Demetri, Sylvestro, Maria, Catharina, and Anna. Joseph's father was a very wealthy merchant. The family eventually moved to Patras. The city primarily dealt with Italian merchants. Stephanini learned the family business and spoke Italian.

When the Greek War of Independence broke out Joseph was captured and sold into slavery. Many people were murdered in front of him including elderly people and infants. The soldiers spared his life because his father was a wealthy merchant and could pay a large ransom. He was severely beaten for three days and begged his captors to put him to death. The soldier took a large pistol and pressed it against his head and pulled the trigger but the gun misfired.

== Slavery ==
He was eventually sold in the market for seventy-eight dollars. He was purchased by an Ottoman military commander named Mustafa Bey of Patras. He was referred to as a Greek dog (skili romi). His master wanted him to convert to Islam. He was put in a dungeon for a period of twenty-eight hours without food or water. They repeatedly asked him if he was willing to convert to Islam. He was repeatedly thrown into the dungeon, in one instance with dogs. His torture continued for roughly two and a half months.

Stephanini survived the torture but because he was unwilling to convert to Islam he was installed as a lower servant. He was the pipe boy, in charge of the pipe and tobacco. Mustafa and the other servants treated Stephanini very poorly. Sometimes Mustafa showed gentle feelings but they were overwhelmed by racist remarks such as skili romi, seni köpek and giaour köpek. The revolution was not healthy for the enslaved Greek population. He could not leave the house of his master without the locals antagonizing him. Stephanini was also an errand boy and eventually was associated with the harem.

Several assassination attempts were made on his life. During the war, the local Greek population was punished by the local Turks when Turkish soldiers died. Greek women and children were brutally murdered in front of Stephanini. On several occasions, Mustafa or his friends had to intervene to save Stephanini's life from a lynch mob. Stephanini relayed the shocking horrors in his book. In some instances, babies and young children were mercilessly beaten to death against the city walls.

Mustafa Bey of Patras was the commander of the Ottoman military in the region. Mustafa moved his family to Nafpaktos for their safety. He was responsible for the Gulf of Patras and Patras Castle. The castles were used as fortresses. He was in a strong fortress at the mouth of the gulf. Stephanini traveled with him on several occasions. One time, Stephanini was severely beaten because he misunderstood Mustafa's mistress. There was a communication barrier because Stephanini did not understand Turkish. He accidentally looked at her face attentively. She took this as a severe insult. Mustafa personally served Stephanini one hundred and fifty strokes of the bastinado. The punishment was so severe his feet bled. Another time his mouth was sewed shut for thirty hours because he said something disrespectful.

== Escape ==
Italian vessels frequently visited Patras Castle. The castle was situated at the entrance of the Gulf of Patras. They frequently traded with the locals. During his final stay in Patras, Stephanini acted as an Italian translator because a Genoese sea captain and trader named Spalla did not speak Greek or Turkish. Mustafa wanted to purchase cargo for the garrison and Stephanini was the only person in the household that spoke Italian. Stephanini found a way to escape. Stephanini convinced Spalla to sneak him out of Patras Castle in the middle of the night. Spalla was familiar with Stephanini's father. Spalla had Stephanini's hair cut and changed his appearance. Stephanini was a runaway slave. He escaped in January 1825. The ship left the Gulf of Patras headed to Smyrna.

The ship arrived in the city of Smyrna after eight days. Stephanini witnessed many Greek slaves in the city. Many of the local Greek inhabitants were disrupted because of the war. A similar situation occurred in Smyrna resembling the massacre in Patras. Many of the Greeks were slaughtered or left homeless. Captain Spalla cared for Stephanini. Stephanini was his clerk. They loaded goods in Smyrna and traveled to Alexandria Egypt. After they exchanged cargo they set off for the island of Crete. When they arrived they offloaded their cargo Stephanini once again witnessed countless Greek slaves on the island of Crete. Several were sold during his stay in the market like animals. Stephanini and Captain Spalla encountered a woman with two children. The seller told them to buy her and the kids for twelve dollars. If they didn't he would kill them. Captain Spalla pleaded that he could not spare room on his ship.

== First trip to America ==
Afterward, they sailed back to Smyrna where they were contracted to take olive oil from Mytilene to Genoa. After they traveled to Genoa, Stephanini lived with the captain in Genoa for several months. He made friends in Genoa. He was searching for his family. He sent letters but received no responses. His friends advised him to travel to Gibraltar because there was a communication system between Gibraltar, Malta, and Corfu. Stephanini left Captain Spalla and traveled to Gibraltar. After over four months of writing letters and listening to stories about different parts of Greece. Stephanini decided to travel to the United States. He boarded the brig Abeona with Captain Fairchild and traveled to New York City. The voyage took forty-four days. He encountered the Greek Committee and begged for help to travel back to Greece to find his family. They assisted him and he traveled on the Six Brothers ship back to Malta on May 14, 1827.

Stephanini received heartbreaking news. Recall he sent countless letters to everyone he knew in Greece searching for his family before he left Gibraltar for the United States. Anastasi Pagoni brought him a letter from a friend he mailed in Previsa. Regrettably, his father died. His mother, two sisters, and two younger brothers were sold into slavery by Albanians. His siblings Maria and Spiro could not be found. He was heartbroken. He continued his voyage with the Six Brothers ship to Nafplio. In Nafplio he witnessed thousands of Greek refugees starving, destitute, and dying. Samuel Gridley Howe and Jonathan Peckham Miller were distributing food to the refugees.

== Second trip to America and book ==
Stephanini once again traveled back to the United States of America. He was on the American vessel Byron with Captain Moore. He arrived in Boston after seventy-three days voyage. He had letters for the Greek Committee. Stephanini stayed at the house of Samuel Gridley Howe's father. After a while, Stephanini traveled to New York and worked at a drug store called O & W Hull. He stayed in this position for one year. Stephanini received an invitation from John S. Richardson. He was invited to Charleston, South Carolina. He advised Stephanini to write a book about his adventure which would raise money to free his family from slavery. The book was entitled The Personal Narrative of the Sufferings of J. Stephanini. Around 1829, he traveled all over the country lecturing and gaining support for his book. The book was highly recommended by people of distinguished character namely: Jonathan Mayhew Wainwright, Ezra Stiles Ely, John K. Kane, and Thomas Smith Grimké.

Stephanini's book began to circulate throughout the United States and he gathered enough money to travel back to Greece. He raised roughly fourteen hundred dollars. He departed the United States on October 27, 1829, on the ship Six Brothers with Captain Lee. He traveled with the editor of the Statesmen newspaper Nathaniel Hazeltine Carter, Dr, Phillip H. Thomas, and Major John E. Lewis. Stephanini arrived in Marseille, France, around December. Stephanini sent letters back to the United States. They were published in newspapers. The final communication from Stephanini was received around December 26, 1829. He traveled to Messina, Italy, on the brig Danube with Captain William Beecher. He stated that they arrived on Christmas Day. He sent a letter to the American consul John L. Payson in the Kingdom of Two Sicilies explaining that he safely arrived. He showed him a letter of recommendation from President Andrew Jackson. The consul was very polite. Stephanini also indicated his next voyage was to Corfu on the brig Industria. The captain of the ship was Captain Vinella, of Genoa. This was Stephanini's last communication to the United States.

== Other Greek-American slaves ==
- Garafilia Mohalbi
- George Colvocoresses
- Christophorus Castanis
- Halet Logotheti
- Alexander George Paspatis

== Literary works ==
- The Personal Narrative of the Sufferings of J. Stephanini (1829)

== See also ==
- Petros Mengous
- James Jakob Williams
- Battle of Arachova
- Thomas Smith Grimké
- The Slave Market at Constantinople

== Bibliography ==
- Stephanini, J. (1829). The Personal Narrative of the Sufferings of J. Stephanini. New York: Vanderpool & Cole, Printers.
