= The Greek Slave =

Marble sculpture by Hiram Powers

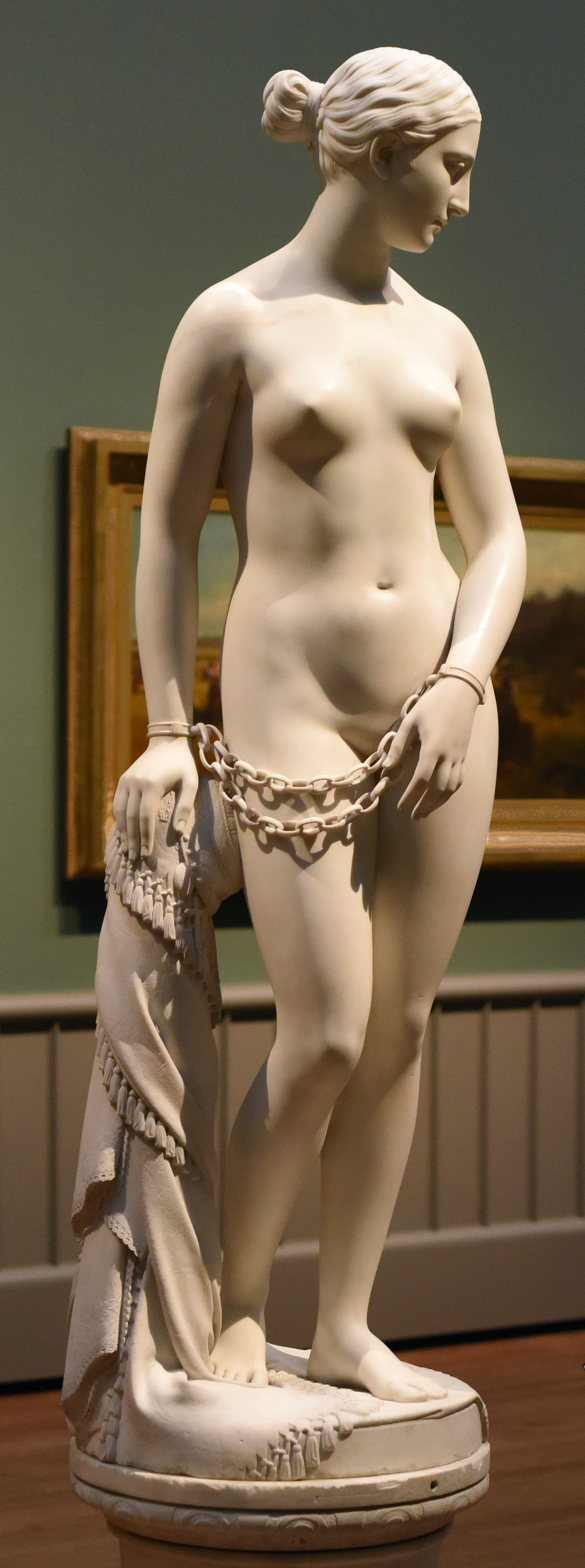
- At Yale University Art Gallery
- Artist: Hiram Powers
- Year: model completed 1843; marbles 1844–1860s
- Type: marble sculpture
- Dimensions: 165.7 cm × 53.3 cm × 46.4 cm (65.2 in × 21.0 in × 18.3 in)
- Weight: c. 236 kilograms (520 lb)
- Location: Smithsonian American Art Museum, Washington, D.C. (1843 plaster model); Raby Castle, County Durham, England (1844); National Gallery of Art, Washington, D.C. (1846); Newark Museum, Newark, New Jersey (1847); Yale University Art Gallery, New Haven, Connecticut (1850); Brooklyn Museum, Brooklyn, New York (1866)

The Greek Slave is a neoclassical marble sculpture by the American sculptor Hiram Powers. It was one of the best-known and critically acclaimed American artworks of the nineteenth century, and is among the most popular American sculptures ever. It was the first publicly exhibited, life-size, American sculpture depicting a fully nude female figure. Powers originally modelled the work in clay at his studio in Florence, Italy, completing it on March 12, 1843. The first marble version (prime version) of the sculpture was completed by Powers' studio in 1844 and is now in Raby Castle, England.

Five more full-sized marble versions of the statue were mechanically reproduced for private patrons, based on Powers' original model, along with numerous smaller-scale versions. Copies of the statue were displayed in many venues around Great Britain and the United States; it quickly became one of Powers' most famous works and held symbolic meaning for some American abolitionists, inspiring an outpouring of prose and poetry. The position of the figure is said to have been inspired by the Venus de' Medici in the Uffizi Gallery in Florence.

== Subject ==
The statue depicts a young woman, nude, bound in chains; in one hand, she holds a small cross on a chain. Powers himself described the subject of the work thus:

The Slave has been taken from one of the Greek Islands by the Turks, in the time of the Greek revolution, the history of which is familiar to all. Her father and mother, and perhaps all her kindred, have been destroyed by her foes, and she alone preserved as a treasure too valuable to be thrown away. She is now among barbarian strangers, under the pressure of a full recollection of the calamitous events which have brought her to her present state; and she stands exposed to the gaze of the people she abhors, and awaits her fate with intense anxiety, tempered indeed by the support of her reliance upon the goodness of God. Gather all these afflictions together, and add to them the fortitude and resignation of a Christian, and no room will be left for shame.

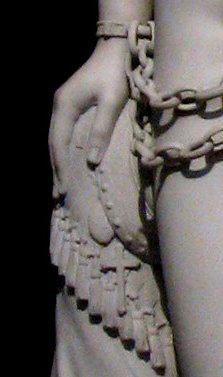
Detail of the statue's hand, showing the cross and locket

When the statue was taken on tour in 1847 and 1848, Miner Kellogg, a friend of the artist and manager of the tour, put together a pamphlet to hand out to exhibition visitors. He provided his own description of the piece:

The ostensible subject is merely a Grecian maiden, made captive by the Turks and exposed at Istanbul, for sale. The cross and locket, visible amid the drapery, indicate that she is a Christian, and beloved. But this simple phase [sic] by no means completes the meaning of the statue. It represents a being superior to suffering, and raised above degradation, by inward purity and force of character. Thus the Greek Slave is an emblem of the trial to which all humanity is subject, and may be regarded as a type of resignation, uncompromising virtue, or sublime patience.

== Exhibition Precedents ==
Before the exhibition of Hiram Powers' The Greek Slave, many artists had unsuccessfully attempted to display artwork and sculpture in America that featured nude figures. For example, Horatio Greenough's Chanting Cherubs depicted two nude figures, which revealed the discomfort Americans felt towards nudity. In Boston, objections to the nudity in the work led to the temporary addition of tiny aprons on the cherubs. In 1829 Greenough disappointedly wrote, "I thought the country beyond that; there is a nudity which is not pure". This was a shocking revelation to the art community and revealed strict perceptions about nudity for American viewers. It is especially surprising because the two figures were putti or baby angels. Despite having religious overtones, the figures were still deemed unacceptable.

Power's The Greek Slave was designed with the American public's sensitive perceptions in mind. Powers intentionally designed the sculpture to be both visually acceptable and logistically sound. The sculpture needed to be practical in shape and size, so by making it with reasonable dimensions, it could be easily boxed up and shipped across the country. He designed the sculpture to fit upon and within the diameter of its pedestal. Powers also knew of Americans' distaste for nude figures after Greenough's failings. As a result, he chose to design a slender nude female figure, but with a unique and captivating narrative. The work featured detailed iconography, including chains, crucifixes, and a locket. These images solidified the woman's identity as a Christian and an enslaved person who was being forcefully stripped of her clothes. These features helped set the stage for viewers to be at ease and appreciate the work's beautiful aesthetic features.

== Greek Slave Movement ==
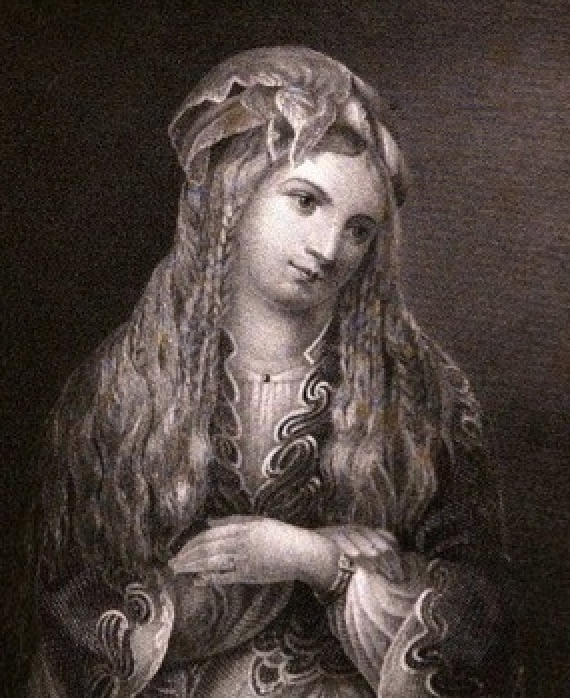
Greek Slave Girl Garafilia Mohalbi by Ann Hall (1831)

The Greek Slave Movement in the United States began in Boston. It was instigated by the Greek War of Independence, following the influx of Greek refugees to the United States during that period. Some of the refugees were freed or runaway slaves such as Christophorus Plato Castanis, Halet Logotheti, Garafilia Mohalbi, Joseph Stephanini, and George Colvocoresses. The horrors of Greek slavery were published in newspaper articles as early as 1828. The title of a popular article was Slave Market at Constantinople which discussed the enslavement of Greek women in great detail. That same year Joseph Stephanini wrote The Personal Narrative of the Sufferings of J. Stephanini. The book discussed Stephanini's experience as a Greek runaway slave. The next year, Greek American educator Petros Mengous completed his book Narrative of a Greek Soldier which discussed the horrors of Greek slavery in great detail and, a freed Greek slave girl died of Tuberculosis in Boston named Garafilia Mohalbi.

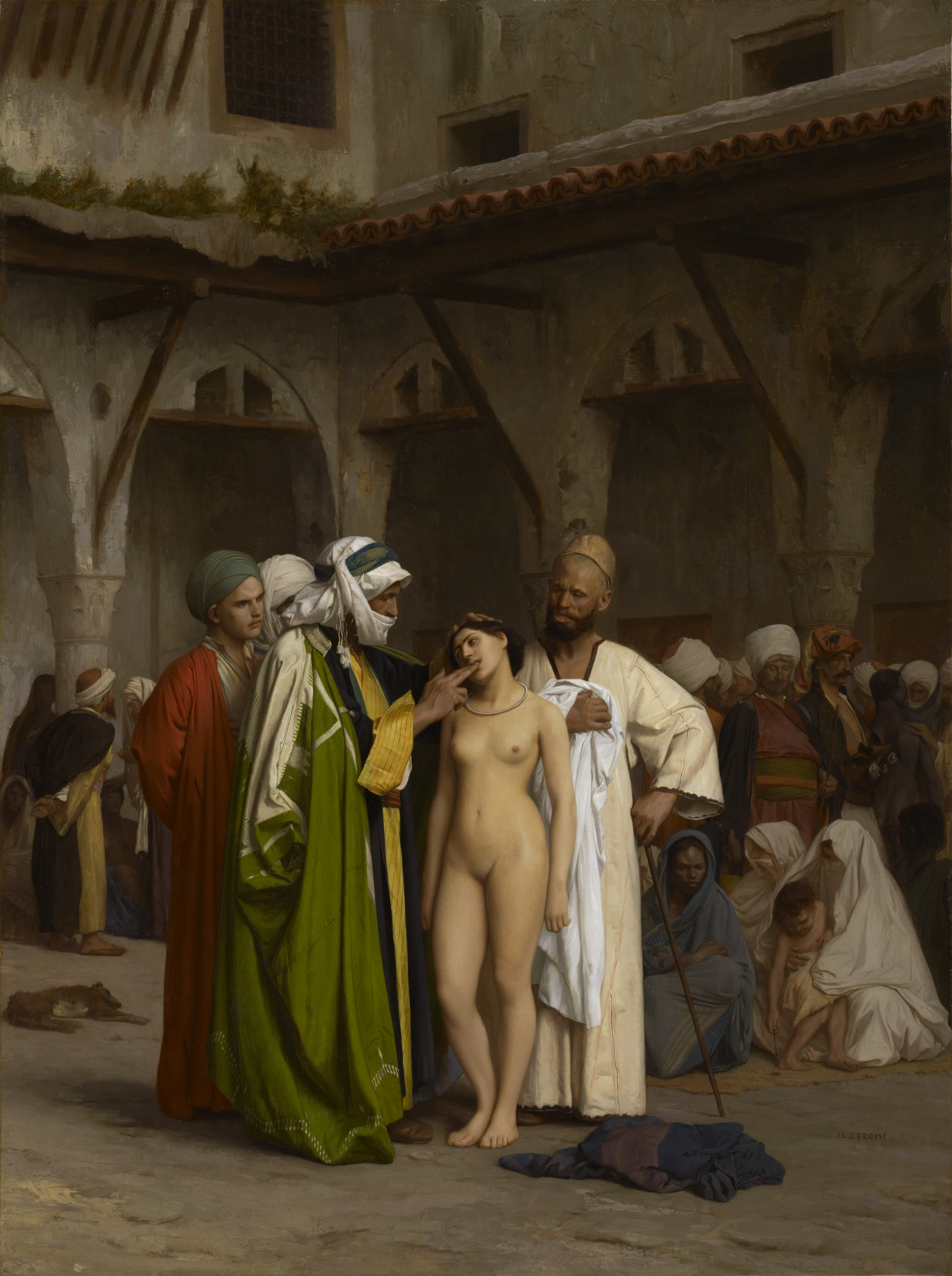
The Slave Market by Jean-Léon Gérôme (1866)

The young girl became a media sensation. American painter and miniaturist Ann Hall painted a miniature portrait of the little girl, and Edward Gallaudet popularized it by engraving and printing numerous copies, which circulated throughout the United States. Lydia Sigourney wrote an epic poem entitled Garafilia Mohalby as early as 1831 which received notoriety throughout the country and by the early 1840s Hannah Flagg Gould was inspired by Ann Hall's miniature portrait and wrote the poem Garafilia's Picture. Around the same period, American sculptor Hiram Powers completed his model of the Greek Slave Statue. U.S. Consul Gregory Anthony Perdicaris completed two volumes of books named The Greece of the Greeks in 1846, which discussed Greek slavery. Around this period the Greek Slave Statue toured the United States. By the 1850s, the Greek slave girl inspired Carl Hause to commission close friend Carl Gartner to compose a song called Garafilia Mazurka for piano in honor of the Greek slave girl Garafilia. The Greek Slave became popular among artists around the world. French painter and sculptor Jean-Léon Gérôme created a painting known as The Slave Market. Other works include The Slave Market by Gustave Boulanger, and The Slave Market by Otto Pilny, completed in the latter part of the 19th century.

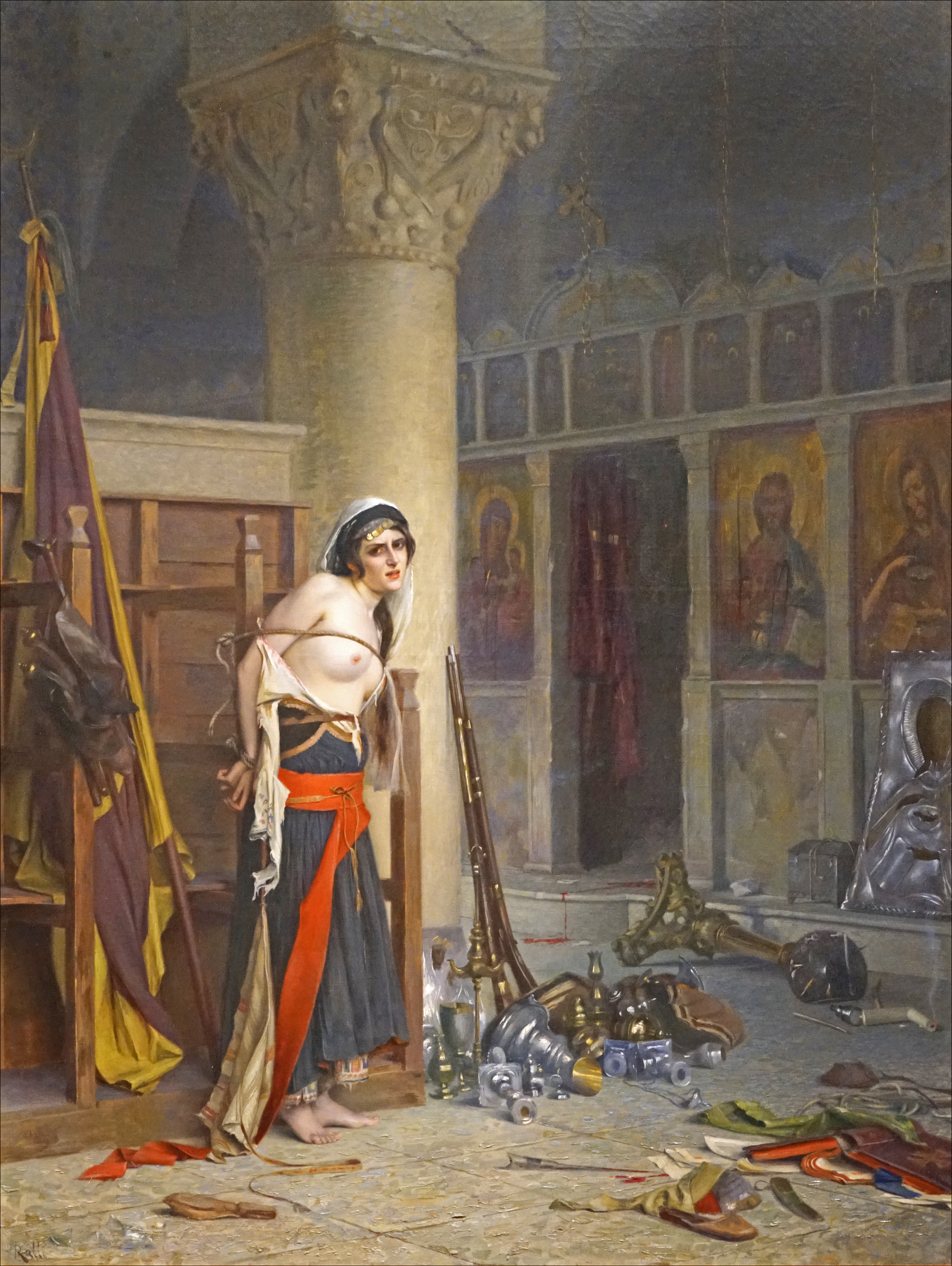
The Booty by Theodoros Rallis c. 1890-1907

Greek American runaway slave Christophorus Plato Castanis published his book The Greek Exile; or, A Narrative of the Captivity and Escape of Christophorus Plato in 1851. The book features an account of his experience as a runaway slave. The slave movement was a tool used by Greek American abolitionists John Celivergos Zachos and Photius Fisk. Zachos and Castanis were classmates in the late 1820s. Zachos became an American abolitionist. Both were refugees brought to the United States as children by abolitionist Samuel Gridley Howe. Harriet Beecher Stowe was inspired by the Greek slave story. She alludes to using the Greek slave girl as motivation for Uncle Tom's Cabin in her next book, A Key to Uncle Tom's Cabin published in 1853. Stowe discusses a communication given to her by Captain Austin Bearse, where he writes about his travels and witnesses slavery all over the world: “I was in Smyrna when our American consul ransomed a beautiful Greek girl in the slave-market. I saw her come aboard the brig 'Suffolk,' when she came on board to be sent to America for her education.” Smyrna was the same city where Garafilia was purchased. The Greek slave movement ended in the early 20th century with the abolition of Ottoman slavery in the 1920s.

== Public reaction ==
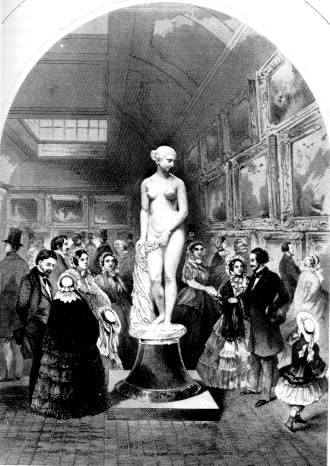
The statue on display at the Düsseldorf Gallery in New York City

Public reaction to the statue was initially mixed. When the work was first exhibited, many people were scandalized by the figure's nudity. In some venues, men and women were required to view the statue separately. Powers countered much of this criticism by suggesting that the young woman was a perfect example of Christian purity and chastity, because even in her unclothed state, she was attempting to shield herself from the gaze of onlookers. Furthermore, he said, her nudity was no fault of her own, but rather was caused by her Turkish captors, who stripped her to display her for sale. So well did this reasoning work that many Christian pastors would exhort their congregations to go and see the statue when it was displayed. The New York Daily Tribune reported on an exhibition saying that viewers were “rapt and almost as silent as devotees at a religious ceremony.”

Some viewers also drew parallels between The Greek Slave and the enslaved people who were concurrently working on the plantations of the American South. Such parallels were initially lost upon much of the statue's American audience, but as the American Civil War neared, abolitionists began to take the piece as a symbol. It was not difficult to leap to a contemplation of the enslaved Greek woman's circumstances and contemporary American slavery. African American abolitionist, writer, and formerly enslaved person, William Wells Brown emphasized the comparison by placing an engraving entitled "The Virginian Slave," a depiction of an enslaved black woman, at the feet of Powers's statue. The comparison was, as well, the subject of a poem by John Greenleaf Whittier. Additionally, the statue inspired a sonnet by Elizabeth Barrett Browning called "Hiram Powers' Greek Slave". Abolitionist Maria White Lowell wrote that The Greek Slave "was a vision of beauty that one must always look back to the first time of seeing it as an era". In 1848, while walking through Boston Common, Lucy Stone stopped to admire the statue and broke into tears, seeing in its chains the symbol of man's oppression of the female sex. From that day forward, Stone included women's rights issues in her speeches.

== Public display ==
A great deal of organization and logistics went into ensuring that Powers' The Greek Slave was viewed by spectators from across the country. In Powers' mind, there was no other man more fit for this task than fellow artist, Miner Kellogg (1814–1889). Kellogg had traveled to Turkey and Greece to study the region's history and culture in preparation for the tour. Kellogg was a knowledgeable and trustworthy showman who managed everything from securing venues to purchasing fabrics and having a platform built to display the sculpture. He was a skilled businessman whose management skills and resourcefulness helped attract the masses. Powers, who remained in Italy while his sculpture toured the US, compensated Kellogg for the exhibition by giving him 20% of the work's net profits, with the understanding that if travel expenses exceeded $10,000, he would be responsible for the difference. Kellogg's early press material justified Powers' absence by describing him as a dedicated artist who was "toiling" in Italy.

Furthermore, Kellogg promoted or advertised the work through a variety of media. For example, he reprinted an essay by the Reverend Orville Dewey that emphasized the work's formal and iconographic qualities in a purer, unadulterated light. Dewey wrote, "clothed all over with sentiment, sheltered, protected by it from every profane eye". Dewey's writings significantly contributed to the exhibition's descriptive brochure. Kellogg created a brochure with the help of George Calvert (1580–1632) and Henry Tuckerman (1813–1871) to help viewers understand the sculpture. The brochure featured a narrative of a Greek woman who was taken captive by the Turks, forcefully exposed and then sold as an enslaved person in Constantinople. This narrative was designed to evoke sentiment in its viewers, which was a popular theme for American art at the time and something viewers would easily resonate with. Power described it, stating that it is not satisfied with designating its material perfection, but eloquently claims its high moral and intellectual beauty. Ultimately, the sculpture was a success because viewers could comfortably view the work and appreciate the artist's skill as well as the sculpture's unique narrative.

== Fabrication technique ==
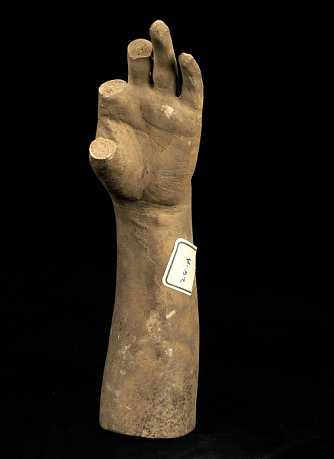
Cast of the forearm and left hand of The Greek Slave (thumb and two fingers missing)

Powers conceived of the Greek Slave as an artwork that would be produced in one or more finished marble statues, a common practice in nineteenth-century sculpture studios. He and his contemporaries rarely carved the final marble products themselves, relying instead on teams of skilled artisans to produce the finished works on their behalf. After he completed a full-scale clay model of the sculpture in his studio in Florence, Powers gave the model over to professional plaster casters. The casters created a multi-part plaster mold, which was then used to cast a durable plaster version of the sculpture. Metal armatures inside the form provided support; these can now be seen in modern x-ray images.

Master carvers then used the durable plaster cast as a measuring tool, covering its surface with hundreds of pencil marks and metal pins, or points, which served as registration marks for a pointing machine. The pointing machine was moved repeatedly from the points on the plaster cast to corresponding areas on a block of marble to guide the carver's tools as he translated the composition into marble. The tool would then be moved, over and over again, hundreds of times, from the points on the plaster to the corresponding locations on the block of marble. Each time, the tool would measure the depth and location on the marble block, creating a three-dimensional guide that helped the marble carver replicate the artist's original form more quickly and with greater ease. When creating the finished marble versions, fine details such as the cross, locket, and chains were finalised and differ slightly among the marble versions. The Smithsonian American Art Museum holds the original 1843 pointed-plaster mold, along with numerous smaller casts from Powers' studio.

== Versions of the artwork ==
Powers' studio produced six full-scale marble versions of the Greek Slave. Nearly identical, each one was made for sale to a different private collector. An Englishman purchased the first of the large marble versions (now at Raby Castle), and it was exhibited publicly in London in 1845 at Graves' Pall Mall. In 1851, it was featured by the U.S. at The Great Exhibition in London, and four years later was shown in Paris. The second was purchased by William Wilson Corcoran in 1851, and entered into the collection of the Corcoran Gallery of Art in Washington, D.C.; with the 2014 dispersal of the Corcoran collection, the statue was acquired by the National Gallery of Art.

Many smaller marble copies of the statue exist, including a 3/4-sized marble in the Smithsonian American Art Museum, as well as versions in the Vermont State House, at the Berkshire Museum in Pittsfield, Massachusetts, and the Westervelt Warner Museum of American Art in Tuscaloosa, Alabama.

The English potters Mintons produced much-reduced (14.5 inches; 370 mm high) copies in Parian ware from 1848. From 1849, the chains between the enslaved woman's hands were not shown, probably to save costs in production.

In 2004, Vermont Governor Jim Douglas ordered the removal from his office of a small lamp replicating the artwork, citing fears that schoolchildren might see it.

== Artist and Agent Relationship ==
By the end of the tour, Miner Kellogg was quite depleted from frequent travel, and it had taken a toll on his relationship with Hiram Powers. There had been frequent disputes over traveling expenses and battles over ownership of the sculpture. It could have been argued that Kellogg felt entitled to more compensation than he had received after traveling across the continental U.S. for nearly five years. It could have also been fair to say that the agent had grown attached to the sculpture. There was an underlying resentment between the two men because Kellogg had dedicated so much of his life to the work's success. Additionally, there were outstanding issues, including a lawsuit against the Pennsylvania Academy over exhibition proceeds. Powers himself did not receive the contested money from the Pennsylvania Academy until 1858, after several additional court rulings. This issue attracted negative press, and it might have been avoided if Kellogg had negotiated more skillfully. This lawsuit only served to deepen the growing rift between the two men because each felt that they were slighted by the other. Ultimately, their relationship fell apart due to their financial differences, legal disputes, and shared legacy of The Greek Slave.

== Locations ==
=== Life-size versions ===
There are six versions: the plaster and five marble statues created from it.

- Smithsonian American Art Museum – the original 1843 plaster model from which the finished marble versions were produced
- Raby Castle, County Durham, England (1844)
- National Gallery of Art, Washington, D.C. (1846)
- Newark Museum, Newark, New Jersey (1847)
- Yale University Art Gallery, New Haven, Connecticut (1850)
- Brooklyn Museum, Brooklyn, New York (1866; the final version)

=== Smaller-scale versions ===
- Smithsonian American Art Museum, Washington, D.C. (about 3/4 size).
- Victoria and Albert Museum, London
- Fine Arts Museums of San Francisco, (45.2 by 15 by 12 inches; 1,150 mm × 380 mm × 300 mm), c. 1873.

== Research ==
In early 2015, the Smithsonian Digitization Program made a three-dimensional scan of the original plaster cast of the sculpture. This scan is now available on their website, with an interactive version and a downloadable version. With this, anyone with a 3D printer can now create their own replica of the piece.

== See also ==
- Greek Women of Souli Running to Their Death by Constance Blanchard
- Garafilia Mohalbi

== Sources ==
Lessing, Lauren (Spring 2010). "Ties that Bind: Hiram Powers' Greek Slave and Nineteenth-century Marriage". American Art. 24 (1): 41–65. doi:10.1086/652743. JSTOR 10.1086/652743.
