= Greek Slave =

Greek Slave may refer to:

- A Greek Slave, late 19th-century musical
- The Greek Slave, mid 19th-century statue
- Slavery in ancient Greece
