= Garafilia Mohalbi =

Greek girl rescued from Turkish slavery (died 1830)

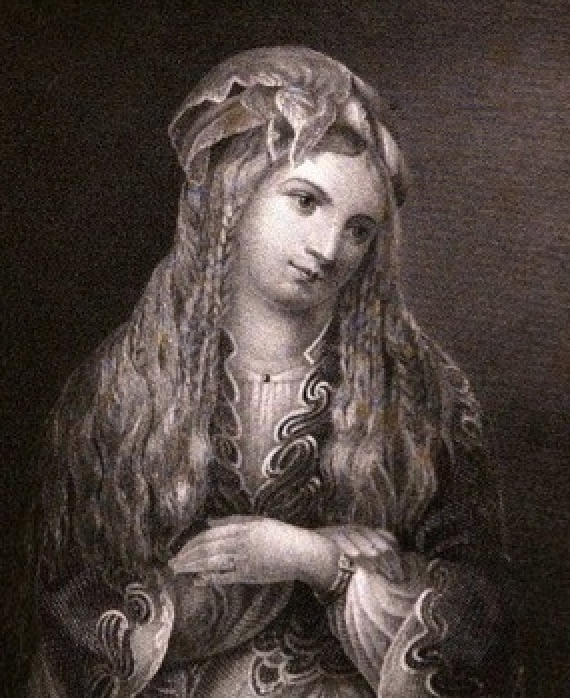
- Engraving of Mohalbi by Edward Gallaudet after a painting by Ann Hall
- Born: c. 1817; Psara, Greece
- Died: March 17, 1830 (aged 12–13); Boston
- Resting place: Mount Auburn Cemetery, Cambridge, Massachusetts

Garafilia Mohalbi(y) (Greek: Γαριφαλιά Μιχάλβεη; c. 1817 – March 17, 1830) was a Greek slave who was rescued by an American merchant and sent to live with his family in Boston, Massachusetts. Born to a prominent family on the island of Psara, her parents were killed in 1824 during the Destruction of Psara by Ottoman forces. She arrived in Boston around the same period Samuel Gridley Howe brought John Celivergos Zachos and Christophorus Plato Castanis and other Greek refuges. She died aged thirteen. After her death, she became a popular celebrity in the media and among abolitionists. Garafilia also became part of the Greek Slave Movement.

== History ==
Garafilia Mohalbi was born to a prominent Greek family on the island of Psara. Her parents were killed in 1824 during the Destruction of Psara by the Turks. Mohalbi and her sisters were kidnapped and sold into slavery. At the age of ten, she was working as a slave to a Turkish family in Smyrna.

At a bazaar in Smyrna, she met American merchant Mr. Langdon and begged him to rescue her from bondage. He purchased her from the family. He adopted her as his daughter. He arranged for Garafilia to sail to Boston, where she would live with his family. Her sisters were also freed from slavery and sent to live in Europe.

Mohalbi became a student at the Ursuline Convent School in Charlestown, a neighborhood in Boston. She died of tuberculosis on March 17, 1830, at the age of thirteen.

== Media and art ==
After her death, Garafilia Mohalbi became well known in the media in Boston, New England, and eventually the entire world. American painter and miniaturist Ann Hall created a miniature portrait of the Greek slave girl.

The miniature portrait later was produced as a popular engraving by Edward Gallaudet. His second cousin was Elisha Gallaudet, he engraved the first US coin, the 1776 Continental Dollar. The portrait of Garafilia Mohalbi was Ann Hall's most popular artwork.

In 1831, Lydia Sigourney wrote a poem for The Youth's Keepsake A Christmas and New Year's Present. She had not yet published any books. In 1835, Sigourney published Zinzendorff, and Other Poems, which featured the same poem, entitled "Garafilia Mohalby". See Garafilia Mohalby.

In 1843, 19th-century American poet Hannah Flagg Gould was inspired by Ann Hall's miniature portrait, of which she had an engraving. She wrote a poem, "Garafilia's Picture", which was featured in her book The Golden Vase A Gift for the Young. Sarah Josepha Hale American writer, and Activist best known for Thanksgiving in 1853 featured an article in her book Woman's Record Or, Sketches of All Distinguished Women about Garafilia.

In the 1850s, Carl Hause commissioned Carl Gartner to compose a mazurka for piano to honor the Greek slave girl Garafilia. Carl Gartner and Carl Hause had a popular trio in the Boston area; they also taught music.

Many ships were named after Garafilia, they were located at different ports. Some include Honolulu, Baltimore and Rio de Janeiro. Parents began to name their children after the popular subject, and some people changed their names to Garafilia Mohalbi.

The popularity of the Greek slave story was circulating throughout the United States. Prominent American sculptor Hiram Powers traveled to Europe to see the slave trade. While in Florence he began to sculpt the popular sculpture The Greek Slave. Many other artists adapted the subject matter which inspired The Slave Market by Jean-Léon Gérôme, The Slave Market by Gustave Boulanger, and The Slave Market by Otto Pilny, in the latter part of the 19th century.

In 1851, Christophoros Plato Kastanes published his book which features a chapter about his experience as a runaway slave from Chios in war-torn Greece. The book became extremely popular in the United States and multiple editions were published. Harriet Beecher Stowe in The Key to Uncle Tom's Cabin, alludes to using the Greek slave girl as inspiration for Uncle Tom's Cabin by writing: "I was in Smyrna when our American consul ransomed a beautiful Greek girl in the slave-market. I saw her come aboard the brig 'Suffolk', when she came on board to be sent to America for her education". The girl was purchased in the same place as Garafilia, and had a similar story.

Other Greek–Americans who were former slaves include Christophorus Castanis, George Colvocoresses, Joseph Stephanini, and Halet Logotheti.

== See also ==
- Petros Mengous
- Dance of Zalongo
- Mary Mildred Williams
- James Jakob Williams

== Bibliography ==
- Gimber, Stephen Henry (1831). The Youth's Keepsake A Christmas and New Year's Present. Boston, MA: Carter and Hendee.
- Kastanes, Christophoros P. (1851). The Greek Exile, Or, a Narrative of the Captivity and Escape of Christophorus Plato Castanis. Philadelphia, PA: Lippincott, Grambo, & Company.
- "The Slave Market at Constantinople" (PDF). Vermont Gazette, Volume 20, No. 39. Genealogy Bank. September 8, 1829. p. 1. Archived (PDF) from the original on April 15, 2025.
