= Lydia Sigourney bibliography =

The following list includes all the works of Lydia Sigourney that were published as books under her supervision. Contributions to periodicals, which number many thousands, are not included; similarly, single poems reprinted for distribution at funerals or for other occasions have been excluded. Where the same work reappeared under a new title, the second title is listed with a reference to the earlier one. The dates in all cases are taken from the title pages, though many of the books were published late in the preceding years to catch the holiday trade.

== Works ==
1. Huntley, Lydia. Moral Pieces, in Prose and Verse. Hartford, 1815.
2. [Anonymous]. The Writings of Nancy Maria Hyde, of Norwich, Conn. Connected with a Sketch of Her Life. Norwich, 1816.
3. [An Anonymous pamphlet]. "The Square Table." Hartford, 1819.
4. Traits of the Aborigines of America. A Poem. Cambridge, 1822.
5. [Anonymous]. Sketch of Connecticut Forty Years Since. Hartford, 1824.
6. Poems; by the Author of "Moral Pieces in Prose and Verse." Boston and Hartford, 1827.
7. [Anonymous]. Female Biography. Philadelphia, 1829.
8. [Anonymous]. Biography of Pious Persons. Springfield, 1832. 2 volumes.
9. [Anonymous]. Readings in History. Springfield, 1833.
10. [Signed L. H. S]. The Farmer and the Soldier. A Tale. Hartford, 1833. [Reprinted in Olive Buds, 1836].
11. [By a Lady]. How To Be Happy. Written for the Children of Some Dear Friends. Hartford, 1833.
12. Sigourney, Mrs. and Smith, Gerrit. The Intemperate and the Reformed. Boston, 1833. [Reprinted in Sketches, 1834].
13. [By a Lady]. Letters to Young Ladies. Hartford, 1833.
14. [Prepared for the Press by Mrs. L. H. S]. Memoir of Phebe P. Hammond, a Pupil in the American Asylum at Hartford. New York, 1833.
15. [Anonymous]. Report of the Hartford Female Beneficent Society. Hartford, 1833.
16. Poems. Philadelphia, 1834. [Beginning with the third edition, 1838, this book was known as Select Poems. The contents were slightly changed from time to time].
17. Poetry for Children. By the Author of How To Be Happy. Hartford, 1834.
18. Sketches. Philadelphia, 1834.
19. Memoir of Margaret and Henrietta Flower. Boston, 1835.
20. Tales and Essays for Children. Hartford, 1835. Page images at Google Books.
21. Zinzendorff; and Other Poems. New York, 1835.
22. History of Marcus Aurelius, Emperor of Rome. Hartford, 1836.
23. Olive Buds. Hartford, 1836.
24. Poems for Children. Hartford, 1836. [An abridgement of Poetry for Children, 1834].
25. History of the Condition of Women. Boston, 1837.
26. The Girl's Reading-book: in Prose and Poetry, for Schools. New York, 1838.
27. Letters to Mothers. Hartford, 1838.
28. The Boy's Reading Book . . . . New York, 1839.
29. [Edited]. The Religious Souvenir for 1839. New York, 1839.
30. Memoir of Mrs. Mary Ann Hooker. 1840.
31. [Edited]. The Religious Souvenir for 1840. New York, 1840.
32. Pocahontas, and Other Poems. London, 1841. [Published in London before Mrs. Sigourney's departure, and in New York a few weeks later].
33. Poems, Religious and Elegiac. London, 1841.
34. Letters to Young Ladies. New Edition with Two Additional Letters. . . . London, 1841.
35. Pleasant Memories of Pleasant Lands. Boston, 1842.
36. Poems. Philadelphia, 1842. [Published by John Locken. The plates were later acquired by Leavitt & Allen and used for many years].
37. The Pictorial Reader . . . . New York, 1844. [This title was claimed by another and the title of The Child's Book . . . was substituted].
38. The Lovely Sisters. Hartford, 1845. [A revised edition of the Memoir of Margaret and Henrietta Flower, 1835].
39. Poetry for Seamen. Boston, 1845. [The whole edition of 1,000 copies was bought by Martin Brimmer for distribution by a sailors' chaplain].
40. Scenes in My Native Land. Boston, 1845.
41. Myrtis; with Other Etchings and Sketchings. New York [copyright, 1846]. E-text (U. of Michigan).
42. The Voice of Flowers. Hartford, 1846.
43. The Weeping Willow. Hartford, 1847.
44. Water-drops. New York, 1848.
45. [Edited]. Sigourney, Mrs.; Hemans, Mrs.; Howitt, Mrs.; Cook, Eliza; Barrett, Miss; Landon, Miss; and others. The Young Ladies' Offering; or Gems of Prose and Poetry. Boston, 1848.
46. Illustrated Poems . . . . Philadelphia, 1849.
47. Poems for the Sea. Hartford, 1850. [Reprints most of Poetry for Seamen, 1845, with some additional pieces and illustrations by William Lawrence].
48. Whisper to a Bride. Hartford, 1850.
49. Letters to My Pupils: with Narrative and Biographical Sketches. New York, 1851.
50. Examples of Life and Death. New York, 1852.
51. Margaret and Henrietta. New York [copyright 1852] .
52. Olive Leaves. New York, 1852.
53. Voices of Home; or Poems for the Sea. Hartford, 1852. [A reprint of Poems for the Sea, 1850, except that the first poem is placed in a different position].
54. The Faded Hope. New York, 1853.
55. Memoir of Mrs. Harriet Newell Cook. New York, 1853.
56. Past Meridian. New York and Boston, 1854.
57. The Western Home, and Other Poems. Philadelphia, 1854.
58. Sayings of the Little Ones, and Poems for their Mothers. Buffalo and New York, 1855.
59. Examples from the Eighteenth and Nineteenth Centuries. First Series. New York, 1857. E-text (U. of Michigan).
60. Lucy Howard's Journal. New York, 1858.
61. The Daily Consellor. Hartford, 1859.
62. Gleanings. Hartford and New York, 1860.
63. The Man of Uz, and Other Poems. Hartford, 1862.
64. Selections from Various Sources. Worcester, 1863.
65. Sayings of Little ones. New York, 1864. [A reprint of the first three parts of Sayings of Little Ones, etc., 1855].
66. [Privately printed. Anonymous]. The Transplanted Daisy. Memoir of Frances Racilla Hackley. New York.
67. [Posthumous]. Letters of Life. New York, 1866.

== Sources ==
Gordon S. Haight, Mrs. Sigourney: The Sweet Singer of Hartford. New Haven: Yale University Press, 1930.
