= Christophorus Castanis =

Greek academic and classicist (1814–1866)

Christophorus Plato Castanis
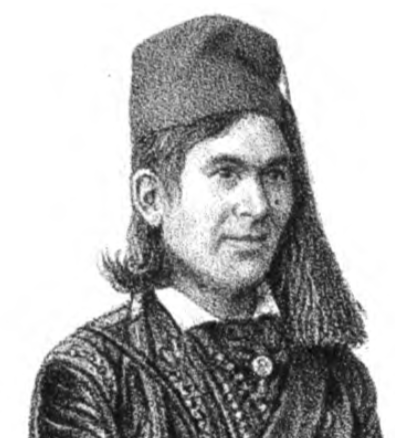
- Christophorus Plato Castanis
- Born: 1 April 1814; Chios, Ottoman Empire
- Died: 1866 (aged 51–52)
- Occupation: Writer
- Known for: Runaway Slave, Lecturer
- Spouse: Rutha H. Clark (m. 1844–1866)

Christophorus Plato Castanis (Greek: Χριστόφορος Πλάτων Καστανής; 1814–1866; also known as Christophoros Castanis or Castanes and Christoforos Kastanis or Kastanes) was a Greek-American academic, author and classicist. Castanis was born at Livadia, Chios on 1 April 1814 and lived much of his life in the United States. He published an autobiography titled The Greek Exile in 1851, which told of his survival of the Chios massacre, his time in Ottoman slavery, and his emigration to America.

== Personal life ==
Castanis was born to a wealthy Chiot family, and was one of eight siblings. He was privately educated and one of his tutors was a member of the Filiki Eteria. In 1822, during the Chios massacre, Castanis was captured and sold into slavery, where he was forcibly converted to Islam. According to his autobiography, Castanis made an escape and was reunited with his mother. They eventually fled on a Cephalonian ship and met with American relief agents at Nafplio. American abolitionist and Philhellene Samuel Gridley Howe sponsored his migration to the US, along with Garafilia Mohalbi and John Celivergos Zachos. According to Castanis, around forty Greek orphans emigrated to the United States in similar circumstances during this period. Some modern scholars, including Gonda Van Steen and Foteini Tomai, verify this, although question the nature of their 'orphan' status. Castanis married American Rutha H. Clark in Worcester, MA on 22 October 1844. Castanis died in the US in 1866.

== Career ==
Castanis arrived in New York City in 1831, and attended Mount Pleasant Classical Institute. He also attended Yale and Amherst College. In 1839 Castanis held a speaking tour, where he delivered lectures on Greek Independence. Many of his written works also dealt with Greek Independence. For example, Washington, DC's The Republic newspaper reported on his 1849 book, Oriental Amusing, Instructive, and Moral Literary Dialogues: Comprising the Love and Disappointment of a Turk of Rank in the City of Washington, claiming it "…is made the vehicle, in a conversational form, of conveying the expression of the author’s republican sympathies in behalf of Greece and Turkey, as well as of discussing some philological questions, intended to prove that modern Greeks pronounce their language as the ancients did."

== See also ==
- Petros Mengous
- James Jakob Williams
- Greek Slave Movement
- Garafilia Mohalbi, another Greek-American slave
- George Colvocoresses, another Greek-American slave
- Joseph Stephanini, another Greek-American slave
- Halet Logotheti, another Greek-American slave

== Published works ==
- Christophorus Plato Castanis, "Caroussis: An Authentic Sketch of the Massacre at Scio", The Knickerbocker; or, New-York Monthly Magazine, Vol. XVII(1), New York, January 1841, 69–70. See in Google books
- Christophorus Plato Castanis, An Essay on the Ancient and Modern Greek Languages: Containing Remarks on the Accents, Pronunciation and Versification of the Greek Languages, with Historical Notices, Etc. To which is Added Extracts from Modern Greek Authors; Christopoulos on Versification; an Oration Delivered Before the New York Legislature; and a Guide to Acquire a Knowledge of the Modern Greek, Allen, Morrill & Wardwell, Andover, Massachusetts, 1844. See in Google books
- Christophorus Plato Castanis, Interpretations of the Attributes of the Principal Fabulous Deities: With an Essay on the History of Mythology, William Hyde, Portland, Oregon, 1844. See in Google books
- Christophorus Plato Castanis, A Love Tale: The Jewish Maiden of Scio's Citadel; or, The Eastern Star, and the Albanian Chief, Philergomathia, 1845. See in Google books
- Christophorus Plato Castanis, Oriental Amusing, Instructive, and Moral Literary Dialogues: Comprising the Love and Disappointment of a Turk of Rank in the City of Washington, John Putnam, Boston, 1849–1850. See in Google books
- Castanis, Christophoros Plato (1851). The Greek Exile, or A Narrative of the Captivity and Escape of Christophorus Plato Castanis, During the Massacre on the Island of Scio by the Turks, Together with Various Adventures in Greece and America. Philadelphia: Lippincott, Grambo & Co. Scan at the Internet Archive of a copy dedicated by Castanis to Joseph Henry, secretary of the Smithsonian Institution.
- Christophorus Plato Castanis, The Greek Boy and the Sunday-School: Comprising ceremonies of the Greek church, mode of baptism, communion, picture-worship, etc., William S. Martien, Philadelphia, 1852. See in Worldcat
