= Lydia Sigourney =

American poet (1791–1865)

Lydia Huntley Sigourney
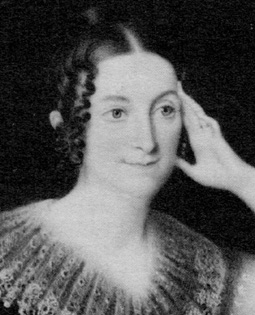
- Born: Lydia Howard Huntley; September 1, 1791 Norwich, Connecticut, U.S.
- Died: June 10, 1865 (aged 73) Hartford, Connecticut, U.S.
- Spouse: Charles Sigourney (m. 1819)

Lydia Huntley Sigourney (September 1, 1791 – June 10, 1865), née Lydia Howard Huntley, was an American poet, author, and publisher during the early and mid 19th century. She was commonly known as the "Sweet Singer of Hartford." She had a long career as a literary expert, publishing 52 books and in over 300 periodicals in her lifetime. While some of her works were signed anonymously, most of her works were published with just her married name Mrs. Sigourney. During the lyceum movement that flourished in the United States in the 19th century, women named literary societies and study clubs in her honor.

== Biography ==
=== Early life ===
Mrs. Sigourney was born in Norwich, Connecticut, to Ezekiel Huntley and Zerviah Wentworth. Their only child, she was named after her father's first wife, Lydia Howard, who had died soon after marrying Ezekiel. In her autobiography Letters of Life, Sigourney describes her relation to her parents, her decision to care for them, and her intent to avoid marriage because it would interfere with this relationship.

I had ... reason for avoiding serious advances. My mind was made up never to leave my parents. I felt that their absorbing love could never be repaid by the longest life-service, and that the responsibility of an only child, their sole prop and solace, would be strictly regarded by Him who readeth the heart. I had seen aged people surrounded by indifferent persons, who considered their care a burden, and could not endure the thought that my tender parents, who were without near relatives, should be thrown upon the fluctuating kindness of hirelings and strangers. To me, my father already seemed aged, though scarcely sixty; and I said, in my musing hours, Shall he, who never denied me aught, or spoke to me otherwise than in love-tones, stretch forth his hands in their weakness, "and find none to gird him"? (241).

=== Education and the school for young ladies ===
She was educated in Norwich and Hartford. With her friend Nancy Maria Hyde, Sigourney opened a school for young ladies in Norwich in 1811 The school was forced to close when Hyde became ill and was no longer able to teach. After the close of the Norwich school, she conducted a similar school in Hartford in the home of Daniel Wadsworth from 1814 until 1819. Frances Manwaring Caulkins entered the Norwich school in September 1811, and remained a very warm friend and frequent correspondent with Sigourney thereafter.

When she was quite young, one of her neighbors, the Widow Lathrop, was friendly with her and encouraged her to develop. After her friend Madam Lathrop died, Lydia was sent to visit Mrs. Jeremiah Wadsworth, an acquaintance of the Widow Lathrop in [Hartford, Connecticut]. This visit put her in contact with Daniel Wadsworth. Daniel helped her set up a school for girls, arranging for daughters of his friends to attend.

In 1815, he also helped her publish her first work, Moral Pieces in Prose and Verse, arranging the publishing and performing the initial editing himself. Sigourney described Wadsworth as her "kind patron" and says that he "took upon himself the whole responsibility of contracting publishers, gathering subscriptions, and even correcting the proof sheets". She goes on to say that "He delighted in drawing a solitary mind from obscurity into a freer atmosphere and brighter sunbeam".

=== Marriage and married life ===
On June 16, 1819, she married Charles Sigourney, and after her marriage chose to write anonymously in "leisure" time. It was not until her parents were in dire need and her husband had lost some of his former affluence that she began to write as an occupation. When she was referred to as the probable author of the anonymous Letters to Young Ladies, By a Lady she admitted authorship and began to write openly as Mrs. Sigourney.

After her death, John Greenleaf Whittier composed a poem for her memorial tablet:

She sang alone, ere womanhood had known
The gift of song which fills the air to-day:
Tender and sweet, a music all her own
May fitly linger where she knelt to pray.

== Writings and criticism ==
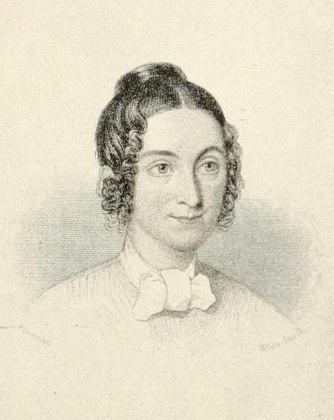
Engraving of Lydia Sigourney

The main themes of Sigourney's writing include death, responsibility, religion — a strong belief in God and the Christian faith — and work. She often wrote elegies or poems for recently deceased neighbors, friends, and acquaintances. Some of her work exemplifies Victorian-era death literature which views death as an escape to a better place, especially for children. There is also a strong flavor of patriotism with many poems linking to the formation of the Republic, and also a large number of poems based on a wide variety of historical subjects. She was particularly strong in her condemnation of slavery and the mistreatment of the indigenous Americans. Another aspect of her work is humor, frequently expressed in poems such as The Comet of 1825. (1827) and Flora's Party. (1834); this extends to her children's verse, for example, Baby's note to a Baby, with a pair of Coral Bracelets. (1836). A contemporary critic called her work, infused with morals, "more like the dew than the lightning".

She enjoyed substantial popularity in her lifetime and earned several nicknames, including "the American Hemans", the "Sweet Singer of Hartford", and the "female Milton". Among other publications, she published in The Token annual gift book, which held considerable influence over American literature. Her influences included the work of Hannah More, William Wordsworth, and William Cowper.

=== Conduct literature ===
An advocate of gendered spheres of society, Sigourney followed the example of Hannah More in creating a gendered rhetorical theory. Sigourney wrote two conduct books. Her first, Letters to Young Ladies, was published in 1833 and was printed more than twenty-five times. This book argued that women should practice reading aloud, and also offered advice in letter writing and memorization. Sigourney promotes the importance of being agreeable throughout the book, and suggests ways to take notes, along with advice on how to paraphrase what one has read. Sigourney recommends that girls should form reading societies, and says that women should use their virtue to promote its appearance in others.

In 1835, Lydia Sigourney published Zinzendorff, and Other Poems which featured a notable poem entitled "Garafilia Mohalbi". American painter and miniaturist Ann Hall also featured the same subject in a miniature portrait which later became a popular engraving by E. Gallaudet an engraver from Boston. A mazurka was written by Carl Gartner entitled "Garafilia" and a ship also bore the same name. Garafilia Mohalbi had been captured at the age of seven by the Turks during the Greek War of Independence. She was kidnapped and sold as a slave to an American Merchant Joseph Langdon. He freed her and adopted her as his daughter. Garafilia was sent to go live with his family in Boston. Three years later Mohalbi died in 1830 at the age of 13 and became the subject of an artistic movement.

Sigourney's second conduct book, Letters to My Pupils, was published in 1837. In this book, Sigourney focuses on pronunciation and conversation, and claims that women should train in enunciation even if they are not going to be speaking publicly. According to Sigourney, women's conversation should adhere to three rules: It should give pleasure; it should be instructive and it should be comforting. Sigourney also made a case for the value of silence at times, and argued that part of a woman's role is to be a good listener.

In both of these books, Sigourney advocates traditional 19th century gendered spheres of society, but she also suggests that women can influence society through their teaching, conversation, and letter writing. Like Madeleine de Scudéry, Sigourney stresses the importance of being agreeable in conversation.

== Legacy ==
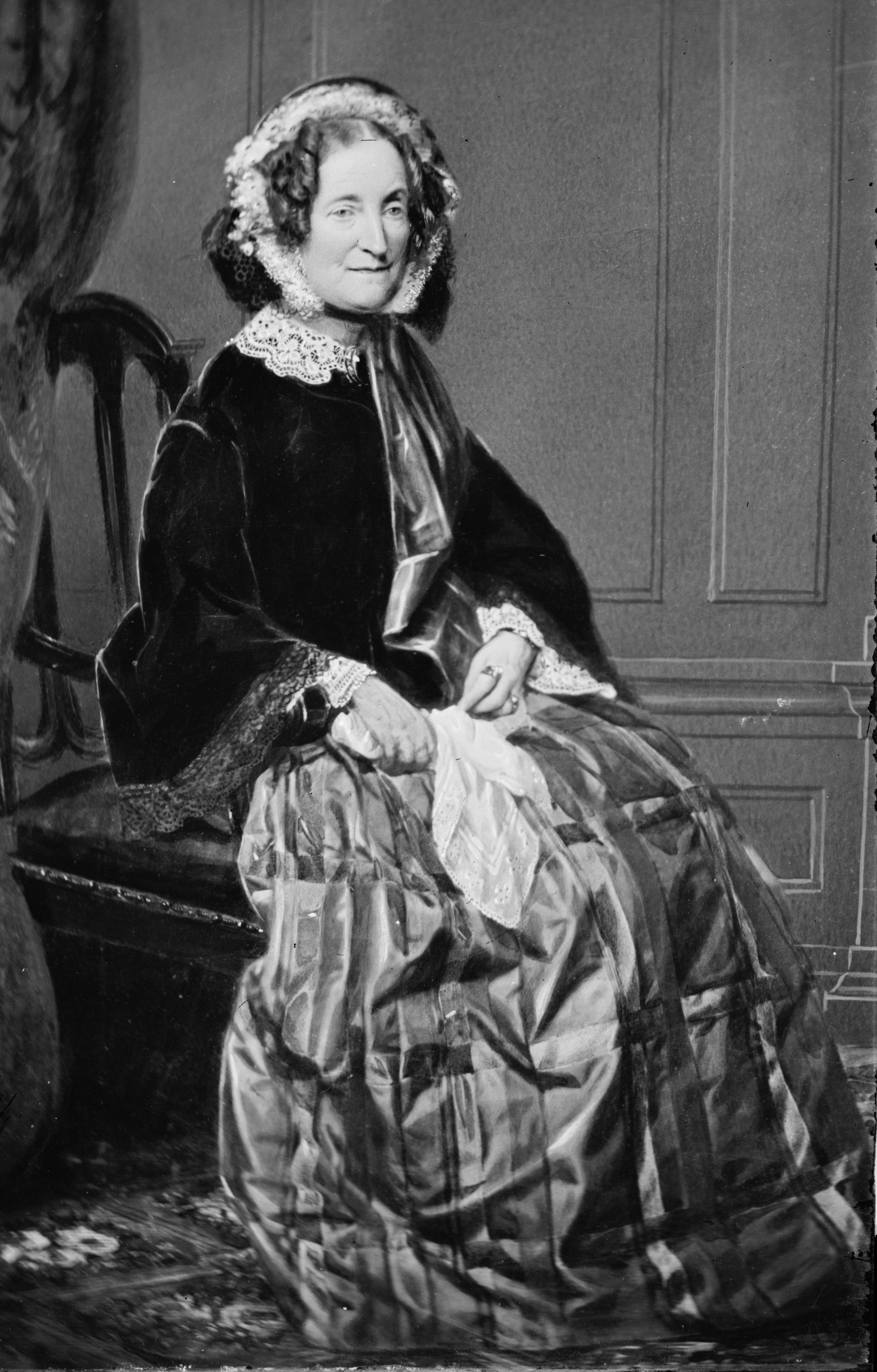
Sigourney, photographed by Mathew Brady

According to Nineteenth Century Criticism, "recently... there has been a renewed interest in Sigourney, particularly among feminist literary scholars. Critics such as Annie Finch, Nina Baym, and Dorothy Z. Baker have studied Sigourney's successful attempt to establish herself as a distinctly American and distinctly female poet." Nina Baym writes about Sigourney's construction of her own identity that through canny participation, it continued throughout her lifetime.

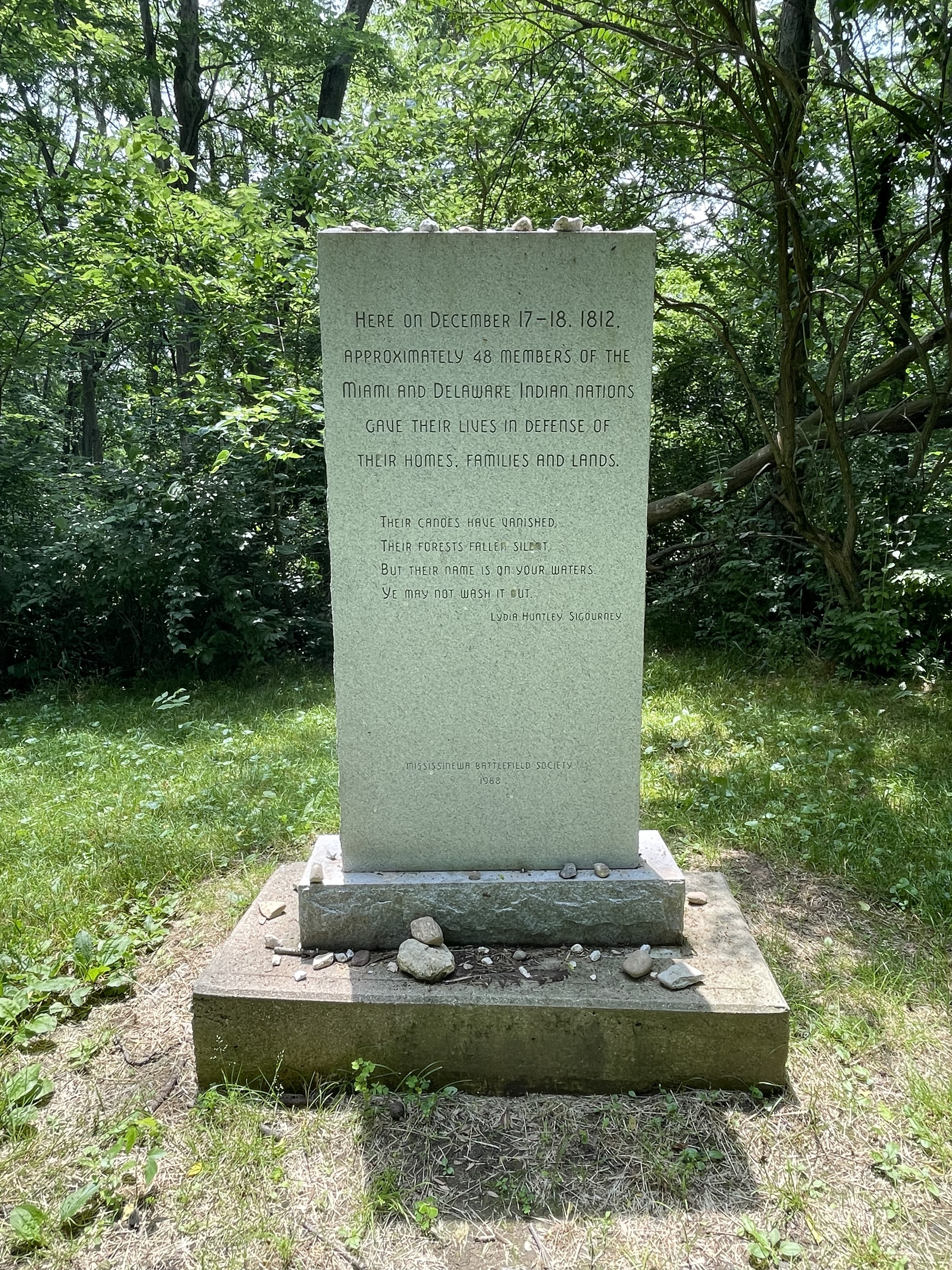
A memorial to the Native Americans who were killed at the Battle of Mississinewa in Jalapa, Indiana, with a quote from Sigourney. The monument was installed in 1988.

She was one of the most popular writers of her day, both in the United States and in England, and was called 'the American Hemans.' Her writings were characterized by fluency, grace and quiet reflection on nature, domestic and religious life, and philanthropic questions; but they were also often sentimental, didactic and commonplace. Some of her blank verse and pictures of nature suggest Bryant. Among her most successful poems are 'Niagara' and 'Indian Names'. The latter was set to music by Natalie Merchant for the 2010 album, Leave Your Sleep. Throughout her life, she took an active interest in philanthropic and educational work. Some of her most popular work deals with Native American issues and injustices. An early advocate for social reform in slavery and in internal migration, Sigourney felt obligated to use her position to help oppressed members of society. In her posthumously published autobiography, "Letters of Life", Sigourney stated that she wrote with the hope of 'being an instrument of good'.

Her influence was tremendous. She inspired many young women to attempt to become poets. According to Teed:

As a dedicated, successful writer, Lydia Sigourney violated essential elements of the very gender roles she celebrated. In the process, she offered young, aspiring women writers around the country an example of the possibilities of achieving both fame and economic reward (19).

Rev. E. B. Huntington wrote a small consideration of Mrs. Sigourney's life shortly after her death. He thought that her success came "because with [her] gifts and [her] success, she had with singular kindliness of heart made her very life-work itself a constant source of blessing and joy to others. Her very goodness had made her great. Her genial goodwill had given her power. Her loving friendliness had made herself and her name everywhere a charm" (85). She wrote to inspire others, and Huntingdon felt that she had been successful.

She contributed more than two thousand articles to many (nearly 300) periodicals and some 67 books.

In 1844, Sigourney, Iowa, the county seat of Keokuk County, Iowa, was named in her honor. A large oil-paint portrait of Lydia still graces the foyer of the county courthouse.

Her poem "Sailor's Hymn At Parting"., from her book Poems for the Sea (1850) is repeatedly quoted in the 2019 film The Lighthouse.

=== Lyceum movement ===
During the United States lyceum movement in the 19th century, women named literary societies and study clubs in her honor, including the following examples:

- Sigourney Society (Oxford, New York) — founded at the Oxford Female Seminary, c. 1836
- Sigourney Society (Gaffney, South Carolina) — founded at Limestone Springs Female High School in 1848 — Lydia Sigourney was invited to become an honorary member; she accepted
- Sigourney Society (Griffin, Georgia) — founded at Griffin Female College, ca. 1848–1858
- Sigournian Literary Society (Pennsylvania) — founded as a society for young ladies at Glade Run Classical and Normal Academy (Glade Run Presbyterian Church) ca. 1851 — There is a Glade Run Presbyterian Church in Valencia, Pa., in Butler County, and a West Glade Run Presbyterian Church in Kittanning, Pa., in Armstrong County. The Glade Run Academy was founded in the Presbytery of Kittanning, and some sources reference Armstrong County.
- Sigournian Society (Centreville, Indiana) — founded at White Water College in 1856
- Sigournean Society (Moore's Hill, Indiana) — founded as a women's literary society at Moore's Hill Male and Female Collegiate Institute (later Moore's Hill College) in 1857 — The society, which was known for a time as the Sigs, ultimately became the Chi Epsilon chapter of Chi Omega sorority; the college, which relocated to Evansville, Indiana, in 1919, is now the University of Evansville.
- Sigournean Society (Indianapolis, Indiana) — founded by Lydia Short as the first literary society for women at North Western Christian University (now Butler University) in March 1859 — The society published a newsletter, The Sigournean Casket.
- Sigournean Society (Greensboro, North Carolina) — founded at Greensboro Female College (now Greensboro College) prior to 1863 — also known as Sigournian Society and Sigourney Society
- Sigournean Society (Batavia, Illinois) — founded at the Batavia Institute, circa March 1866
- Young Ladies' Sigournean Band (Kokomo, Indiana) — flourished circa 1870s
- Sigournean Club (Olathe, Kansas) — founded as a women's study club in 1890 and apparently survived until the 1970s — According to its constitution, "The object of this club shall be the attainment of a higher plane of life through broad culture, free discussion and mutual helpfulness."
- Sigournean Club (Winfield, Kansas) — organized as an afternoon study club in 1898 — The main purpose of the club was to further the study of art and literature.
- Sigournean Club (Ottawa, Kansas) — founded prior to 1899 — This club contributed a complete library of 50 books to the Kansas Traveling Libraries in 1899.

== Selected works ==
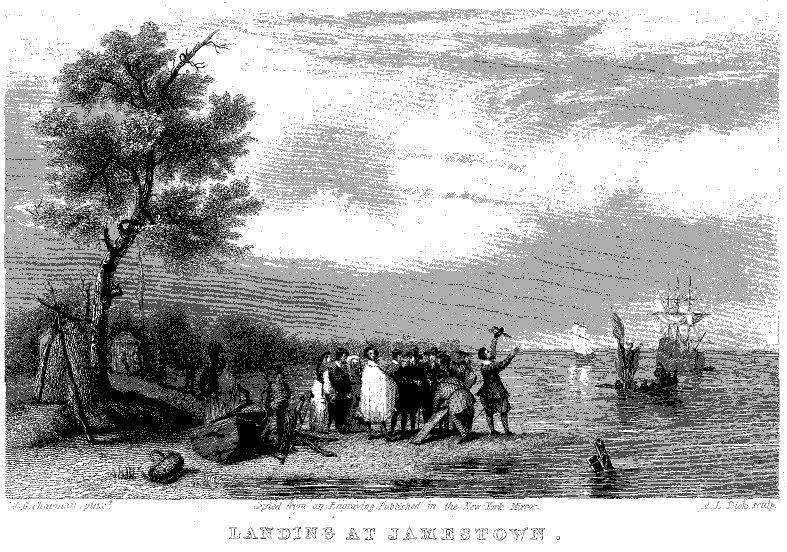
Landing at Jamestown, an engraving by A.L. Dick, was used as the frontispiece of Pocahontas and Other Poems.

- Moral Pieces in Prose and Verse (1815)
- Traits of the Aborigines of America (1822), a poem
- A Sketch of Connecticut Forty Years Since (1824)
- Poems (1827)
- Evening Readings In History (1833)
- Letters to Young Ladies (1833), one of her best-known books
- Sketches (1834)
- Poems (1834)
- Zinzendorff, and Other Poems (1836)
- Poetry for Children (1836)
- Olive Buds (1836)
- Letters to Mothers (1838), republished in London
- Pocahontas, and Other Poems (1841) New York.
- Pocahontas, and Other Poems. (1841) London. This edition for English readers differs considerably from that published in New York.
- Pleasant Memories of Pleasant Lands (1842), descriptive of her trip to Europe in 1840
- Scenes in My Native Land (1844)
- Letters to My Pupils (1851)
- Olive Leaves (1851)
- The Faded Hope (1852) in memory of her only son, who died when he was nineteen years old
- Past Meridian (1854)
- The Daily Counsellor (1858), poems
- Gleanings (1860), selections from her verse
- The Man of Uz, and Other Poems (1862)
- Letters of Life (1866), giving an account of her career

== Popular culture ==
In 1837, Henry Russell used Ms. Sigourney's poem for his song "Washington's Tomb".
