= George Musalas Colvocoresses =

United States Navy officer (1816–1872)

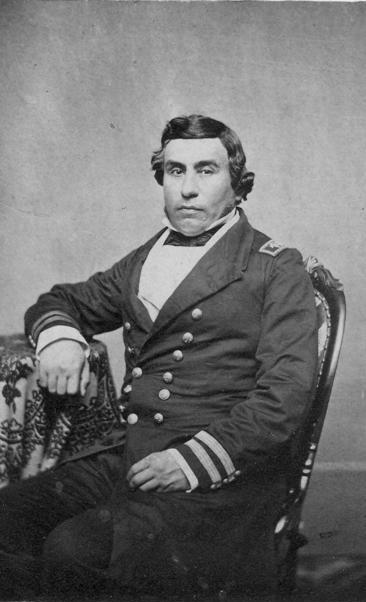
- Born: October 22, 1816; Chios, Ottoman Empire
- Died: June 3, 1872 (aged 55); Bridgeport, Connecticut, U.S.
- Spouse(s): Eliza Freelon Halsey (1846–1863); Adeline Maria Swasey (1867–1872)
- Children: George Partridge Colvocoresses; Franka Eliza Colvocoresses; Eva Freelon Colvocoresses; Ellena Seaman Colvocoress.
- Military career
- Allegiance: United States
- Branch: United States Navy
- Service years: 1832–1872
- Rank: Captain
- Nickname: "Colvos"
- Commands: USS Supply; USS Saratoga
- Wars: American Civil War

George Musalas "Colvos" Colvocoresses (October 22, 1816 – June 3, 1872) was a Greek-American Navy officer who commanded the Saratoga during the American Civil War. From 1838 up until 1842, he took part in the United States Exploring Expedition, which explored large regions of the Pacific Ocean.

== Biography ==
=== Early life ===
He was born on the island of Chios in the Greek Archipelago on October 22, 1816. As a member of the nobility of the island, he was kidnapped along with his mother and two sisters and ransomed from the Turks after the massacre of the Greek population of the island in 1822, during the Greek War of Independence. His family's fortunes were devastated by the massacre. Most close relatives, including six brothers, were killed. He was enslaved at 6 years of age, but his father managed to buy back his freedom.

By 1824, Colvocoresses was sent to Baltimore in the United States by his father. He became the adopted son of Captain Alden Partridge, the founder of the American Literary, Scientific, and Military Academy (later Norwich University) in Norwich, Vermont. Colvocoresses entered the Navy after graduating from the Academy in 1831. Several generations of his family have also graduated from Norwich and followed military careers.

=== Naval career ===
In 1832, he was appointed a midshipman, and in 1836–1837 attached to the frigate United States on the Mediterranean Squadron. From 1838 up until 1842, he served in the United States Exploring Expedition, better known as the Wilkes Expedition of the Pacific Ocean. Colvocoresses authored a work on the Wilkes Expedition in 1852, entitled Four Years in a Government Exploring Expedition. He was promoted to lieutenant on December 7, 1843, and to commander on July 2, 1861.

On January 29, 1862, the vessel Supply, under his command, captured the Confederate schooner Stephen Hart off the south coast of Florida, carrying assorted cargo. In early August 1864 with 115 men in 7 boats from his sloop Saratoga, he conducted an expedition to gather intelligence and capture enemy prisoners. Two week later, at South Newport, Georgia, Colvocoresses led 130 men in boats, capturing a lieutenant and 38 privates of the Third South Carolina Cavalry, six overseers of saltworks he had destroyed, and 71 slaves.

He was promoted to captain and placed on the retired list on April 4, 1867.

Colvocoresses was robbed and murdered in Bridgeport, Connecticut, on June 3, 1872, while on his way to New York. The case was never solved.

== Legacy ==
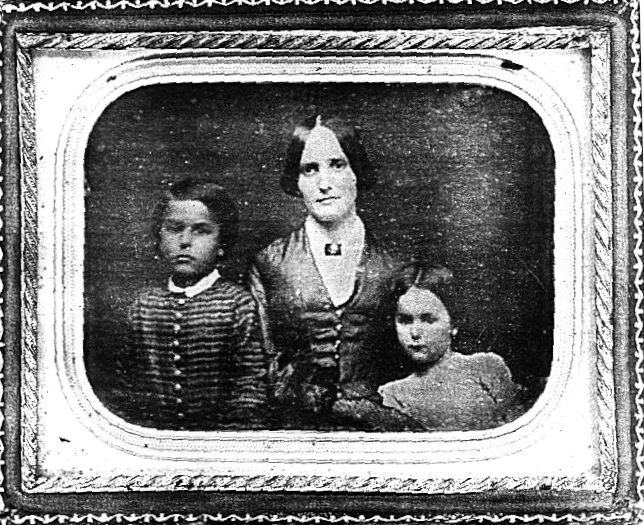
From left to right: Colvocoresses' son Rear Admiral George Partridge Colvocoresses, wife Eliza Freelon Halsey Colvocoresses, and daughter

Colvocoresses was married twice. His first wife was Eliza F. Halsey. They married in May 1846. Eliza was the daughter of Commander Thomas W. Freelon of the United States Navy. The couple had four children, including Frank E. and George P. After her death in the 1860s he remarried; his second wife was Adeline Maria Swasey.

- His son, George Partridge Colvocoresses—named for his father's benefactor—also led a distinguished military career, rising to the rank of admiral in the U.S. Navy. He served under then-Commodore George Dewey in the Asiatic Fleet, and distinguished himself in service during the Spanish–American War. His name appears on the Centennial Staircase at Norwich.
- His daughter Franka Eliza Colvocoresses married nonfiction writer and editor John Denison Champlin Jr.
- His daughter Ellena Seaman Colvocoresses's grandson Charles Whitney Haddock was U.S. Army Corporal, serving during World War II
- His great-grandson, Alden Partridge Colvocoresses, received the Purple Heart as well as two Silver Stars. His career spanned World War II, the Korean War, and the Vietnam War. After leaving the army, Alden was a pioneer in satellite mapping techniques, including the Space Oblique Mercator projection that maps images from Landsat satellites, which he used to develop the first satellite map of the United States.

=== Namesake ===
- Colvos Passage, a tidal strait in Puget Sound, was named in honor of Colvocoresses

== Other Greek American slaves ==
- Garafilia Mohalbi
- Christophorus Castanis
- Joseph Stephanini
- Halet Logotheti

== See also ==
- George Sirian
- George Partridge Colvocoresses
- John Celivergos Zachos
- List of unsolved murders
