= Jonathan Miller (abolitionist) =

American abolitionist & philhellene

Jonathan Peckham Miller
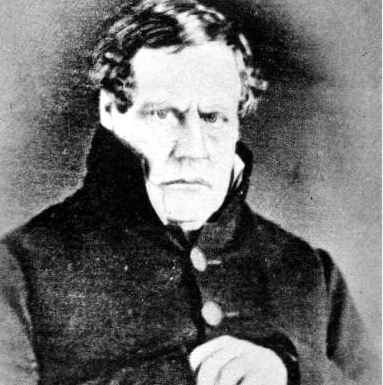
- Miller ca. 1840
- Born: February 24, 1797; Randolph, Vermont, US
- Died: February 17, 1847 (aged 49); Montpelier, Vermont, US
- Resting place: Green Mount Cemetery, Montpelier, Vermont
- Education: University of Vermont
- Known for: Advocate for abolition of slavery and women's rights
- Spouse: Sarah Arms Miller
- Children: George Sennott (adopted), Lucas M. Miller (adopted), Sarah Miller Keith, Abijah Keith (son-in-law)

Colonel Jonathan Peckham Miller (February 24, 1797 – February 17, 1847) was an American abolitionist from Vermont. He served in the Greek War of Independence and returned to be a politician standing up for the rights of slaves and women. He and Sarah Arms Miller used their house as a station on the Underground Railroad.

He represented the town of Berlin in the Vermont Legislature from 1831 to 1833. In his last year as a representative, he introduced a resolution calling for the abolition of slavery in the District of Columbia. “His heroic exploits in the cause of freedom earned him the soubriquet, The American Dare Devil,’” according to an article in the Rutland Herald by Paul Heller in January 2018.

== Life ==
Miller was born in Randolph, Vermont in 1797 and he was undertaking military training during the War of 1812. He enlisted in the US army in 1817 for two years in Massachusetts. He then enrolled at Dartmouth College in 1821 and after a few weeks transferred to University of Vermont, where he stayed until 1824.

The Greek War of Independence from the Ottoman Empire began in 1821 and Miller answered their calls for assistance by travelling there in 1824. His bravery in guerrilla units earned him the rank of Colonel and he returned to America, but still remained loyal to the cause and he raised thousands of dollars and gathered relief supplies. Miller supervised the transportation of these to Greece on behalf of supporters of the Greek cause in Boston and New York where they were shared amongst the war-torn Greeks. Miller returned to Vermont in 1827. Miller returned with Lucas Miltiades, a four year old Greek orphan, whom he adopted and raised. Miller married Sarah Arms on June 26, 1828. It was Jonathan who followed his new wife in sheltering slaves escaping via the "Underground Railroad". The Millers helped the railroad financially and they would ferry escapees using stagecoaches.

1840 World Anti-Slavery Convention. Move your cursor to identify Miller or click the icon to enlarge

Miller's interests in rights made him become a lawyer in 1831 when he also ran for the Vermont legislature. Meanwhile, he arranged for lectures and gave them himself in favor of abolitionist causes. One of his resolutions in 1833 in the legislature was to require senators to promote anti-slavery. In 1835 the radical American reformer Samuel Joseph May came to speak in Montpelier; it was Miller who stepped forward to intercede with a hostile crowd. Vermont was possibly the most abolitionist of the Northern American states. In 1840 the legislature had declared that fugitive slaves were entitled to a trial by jury. This measure was overturned by the Supreme Court but Vermont responded with its own counter initiatives.

Miller was chosen to travel to England in 1840 to attend the World Anti-Slavery Convention in London. The convention came after a debate in the American organisation led by Wendell Phillips, William Lloyd Garrison, and Samuel May, who unsuccessfully proposed that women should be recognised as full members and allowed a management role in the American Anti-Slavery organisations. Miller had been an active supporter of the inclusion of women as members of the American Anti-Slavery Society that same year. Therefore, amongst the delegates were some women. The convention had decided to exclude women, including the American delegates. A last-minute debate took place to try and save the day. Ann Phillips told her husband Wendell not to "shilly-shally" when discussing the issue and Miller set forth his point of view. Even though Vermont had chosen to send only male delegates, he argued that "if our female friends were here ... then this hall would not hold them". He said that "women were amongst our primeval abolitionists" as they had "established a standard of liberty" that their husbands followed.

Miller had spoken out boldly, but the moderates were not convinced and although the women were allowed into the convention they had to sit separately and they were not allowed to speak. Miller took his assigned seat at the convention whilst another American delegate William Adam decided to sit with the women. Miller was included in the commemorative painting which now hangs in the National Portrait Gallery in London. The following year another Anti-Slavery Convention was held in New Hampshire and Miller was one of the speakers, together with William Lloyd Garrison and Nathaniel Peabody Rogers, who had also been in London the previous year.

Miller died in Montpelier, Vermont, after devoting the end of his life to the abolitionist cause. He is buried at Green Mount Cemetery in Montpelier.

== See also ==
- Samuel Gridley Howe
- John Dennison Russ
- James Jakob Williams
