= Patras Castle =

Patras Castle, Greece

- Patras, Peloponnese, Greece
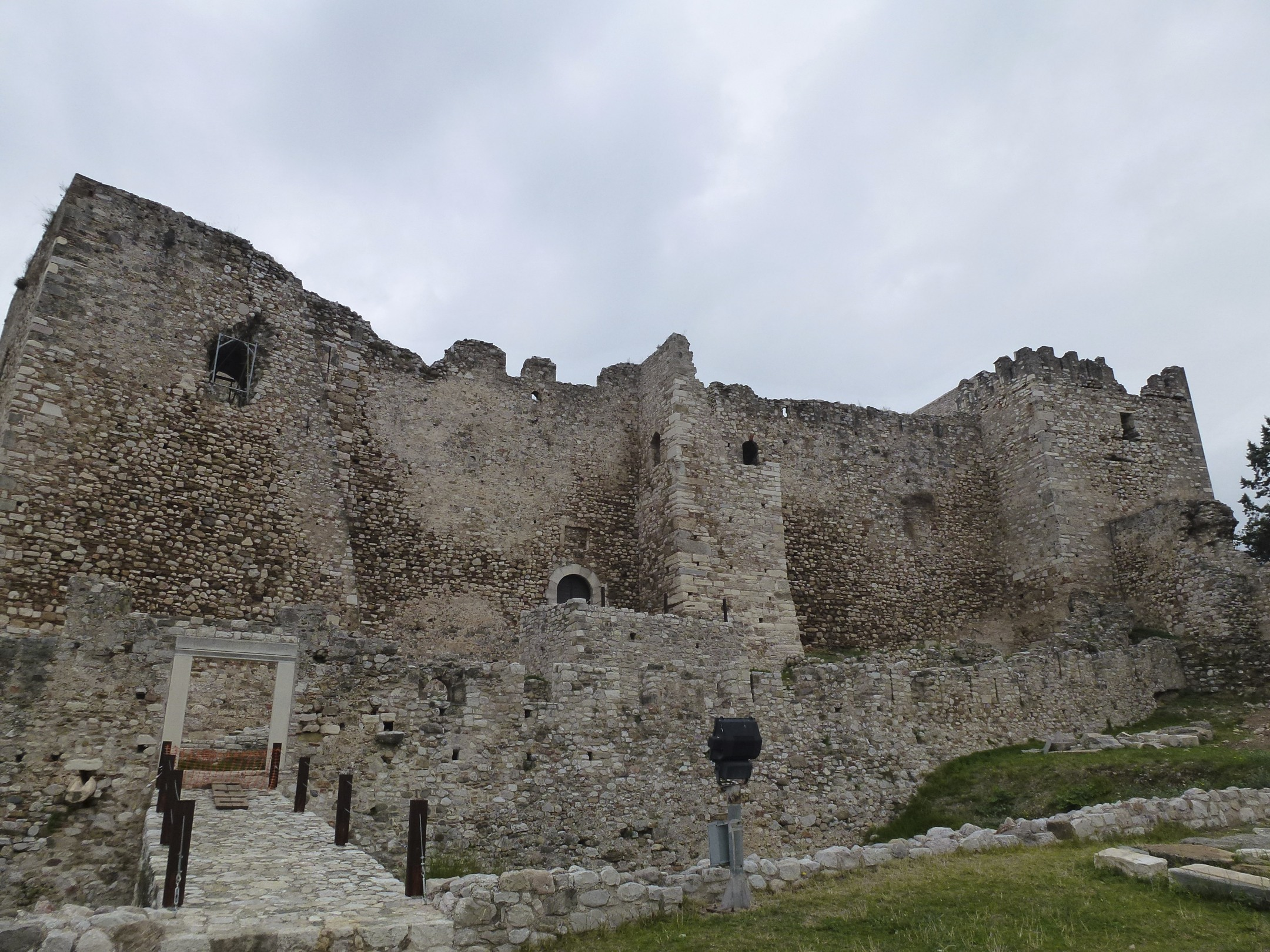
- Patras' castle, taken some metres away from the main entrance (2011)

Site information
- Type: hilltop citadel
- Owner: Hellenic Ministry of Culture
- Controlled by: Byzantine Empire 6th century–1205, 1430–1458; Principality of Achaea 1205–1278; Republic of Venice 1408–1413; Ottoman Empire 1458–1823; Greece 1823–1973
- Open to the public: Yes
- Condition: ruin

Location
- Location within Greece
- Coordinates: 38.2450°N 21.7418°E

Site history
- Built by: Byzantine Empire
- Materials: hewn stone (ashlar)
- Battles/wars: The Great siege of 805 CE

Patras Castle (Greek: Κάστρο Πατρών) is a medieval structure in Patras, Greece. It was built around the mid-6th century AD above the ruins of the ancient acropolis of the city, on a low outlying hill of the Panachaiko Mountain and ca. 800 m from the sea. The castle covers 22,725 m² and consists of a triangular outer wall, strengthened by towers and gates and further protected originally by a moat, and an inner compound on the northeastern corner, also protected by a moat.

The first castle on the spot was built by Byzantine emperor Justinian I after the catastrophic earthquake of 551, re-using building material from pre-Christian structures. One of these spolia, the torso and head of a marble Roman statue, became part of the city's folklore, a sort of genius loci. It is known as the "Patrinella", a maiden who is supposed to have been transformed into a man during Ottoman times, guards the city against disease and weeps whenever a prominent citizen of Patras dies.

The fort remained in constant use thereafter, even until the Second World War. In the Byzantine period, it was besieged by Slavs, Saracens, Normans and many others, but it never fell. In particular, the successful repulsion of a great siege of 805 AD by the Arabs and the Slavs was attributed to the city's patron saint, St Andrew.

In 1205, in the aftermath of the Fourth Crusade, it was taken over by the Franks, who strengthened it further, opening a moat on all three sides. In 1278, the Principality of Achaea pawned it to the local Latin Archbishop, while the Pope leased it to the Venetians for five years in 1408. The Latin Archbishop remained in possession of the castle until 1430, when it was taken by the Despot of the Morea and future last Byzantine emperor, Constantine Palaiologos, who made extensive repairs to its walls. The castle fell to the Ottoman Turks in 1458, and remained one of their main seats of power in the Peloponnese throughout the Tourkokratia. The Venetians took the castle in 1687 during the Morean War, and kept it until the Morea was retaken by the Turks in 1715, who called it Balya Badra (from Greek Παλιά Πάτρα, 'Old Patras').

Following independence, the castle remained in use by the Greek Army until after World War II. In 1973, the castle was turned over to the 6th Ephorate of Byzantine Antiquities. It is used nowadays for cultural events, especially during summer, and features a theatre with a capacity of 640 seats.
