= Ann Hall =

American painter

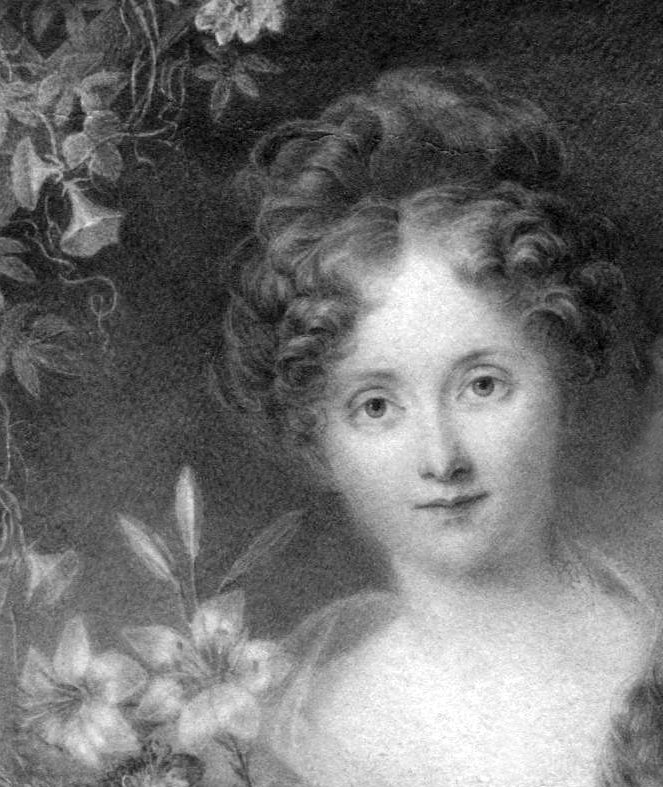
- A self-portrait of the artist, a detail from the family group portrait, Ann Hall, Her Sister Eliza Hall Ward, and Her Nephew Henry Hall Ward of 1828
- Born: May 31, 1792; Pomfret, Connecticut, U.S.
- Died: December 11, 1863 (aged 71); New York City, U.S.
- Education: Alexander Robertson
- Known for: Painting
- Awards: Elected to the National Academy of Design in 1833

Ann (or Anne) Hall (May 31, 1792 – December 11, 1863) was an American painter and miniaturist.

Ann Hall has been described as the most successful miniature painter active in early nineteenth-century New York, renowned for her engaging portraits, especially of children and young brides. Although many of her compositions strike modern audiences as sentimental, her popularity during her lifetime and the significance of her career are attested by the high prices paid for her miniatures (often five hundred dollars per commission) and her election to the National Academy of Design, New York. She has been credited for inspiring a renaissance in the technique of painting miniatures on ivory in the United States.

== Early life ==
Hall was born in Pomfret, Connecticut, on May 31, 1792, the sixth of eleven surviving children of Jonathan (or John) Hall, a prominent medical doctor, and his wife, the former Bathesheba Mumford. Her considerable artistic talent was encouraged by her family and at a young age she was experimenting with several different techniques, including cutting silhouettes, modeling figures in wax, and executing flower pictures and still lifes in watercolor and pencil.

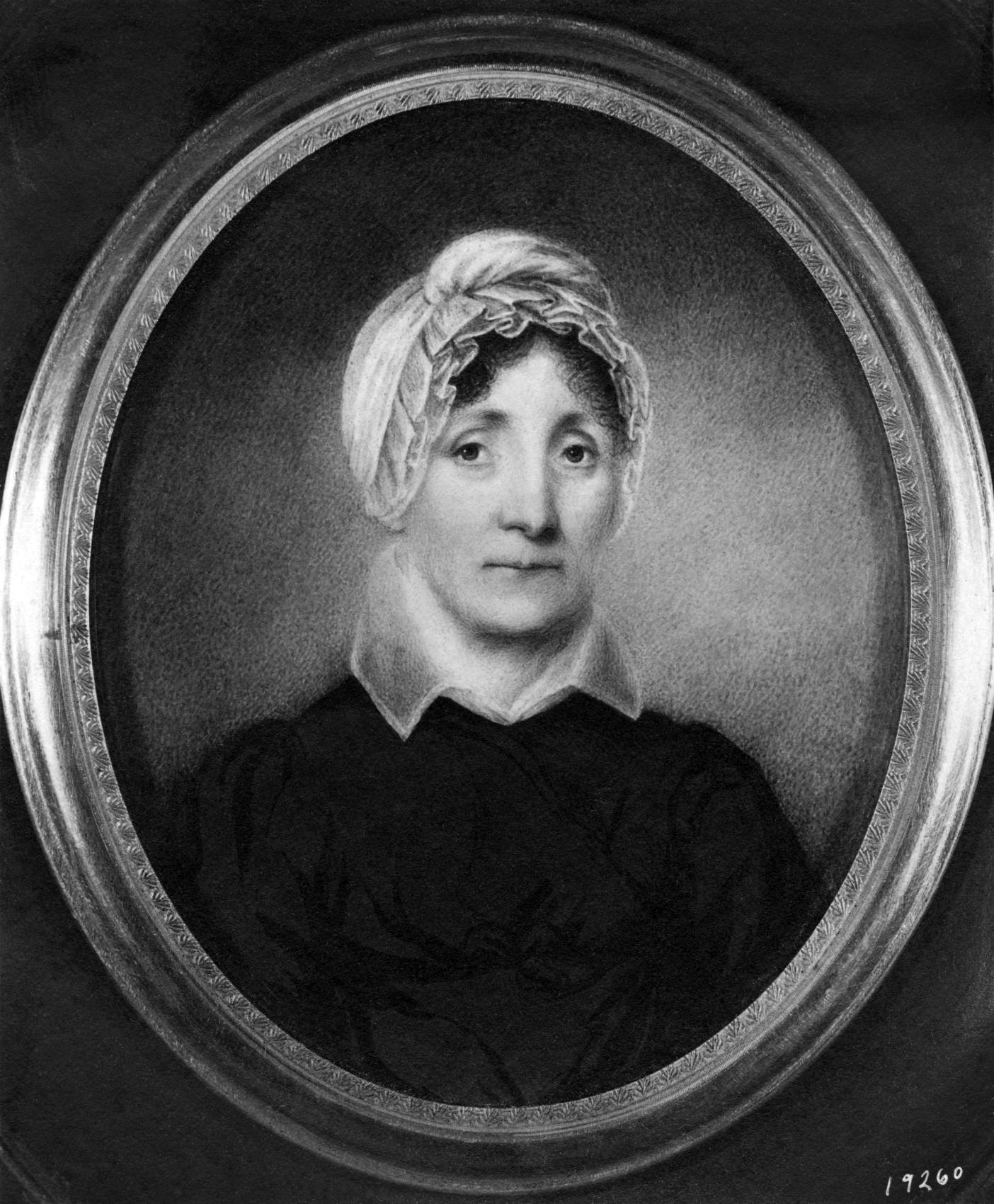
Mrs. Jonathan Hall (Bathsheba Mumford), the Artist's Mother, 1838. Miniature on ivory, 3 1/2 x 3 in. Private collection, Hillsborough, California

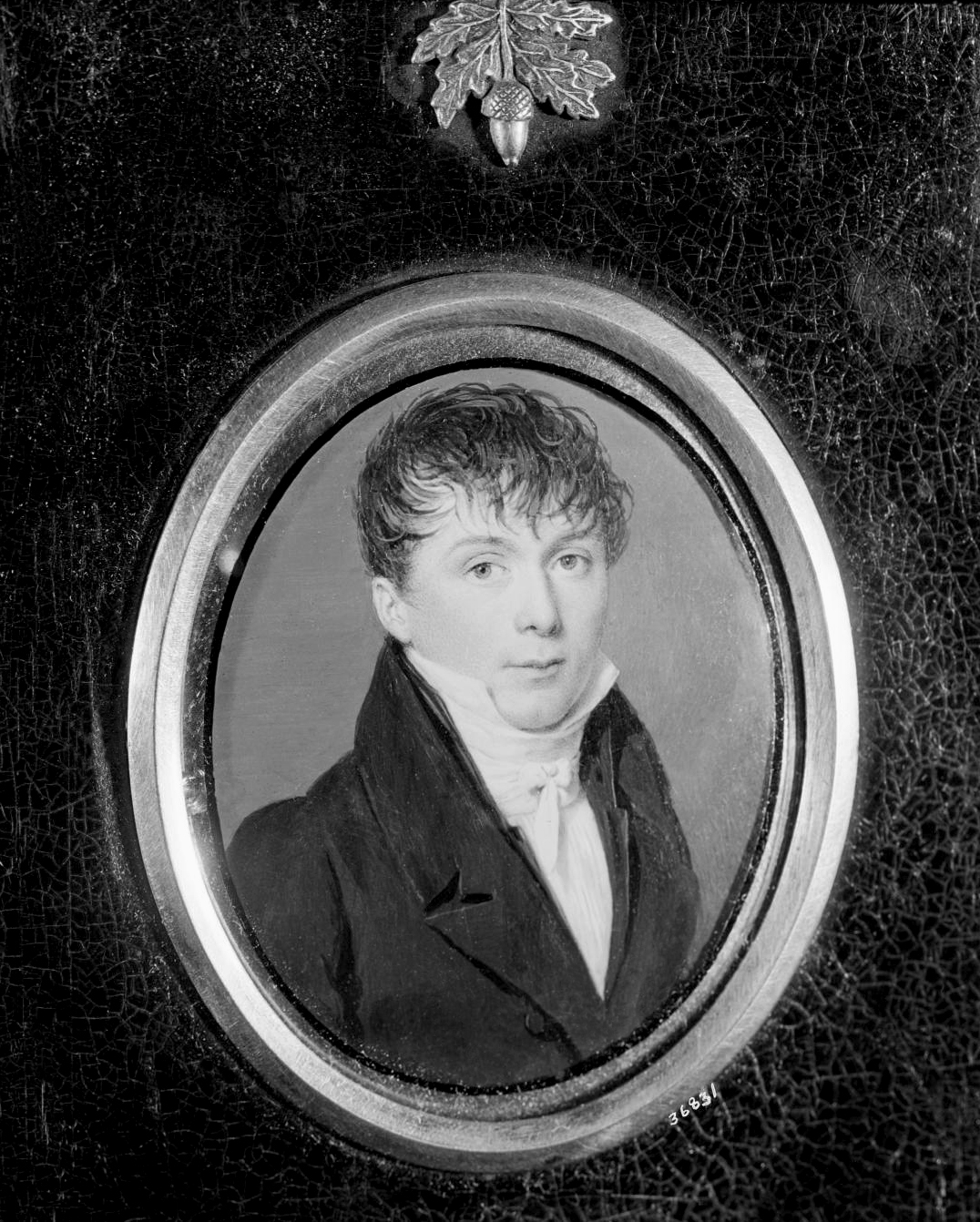
Charles Henry Hall, the Artist's Brother, undated. Miniature on ivory, 2 5/8 x 2 1/8 in. On the art market in November 1946

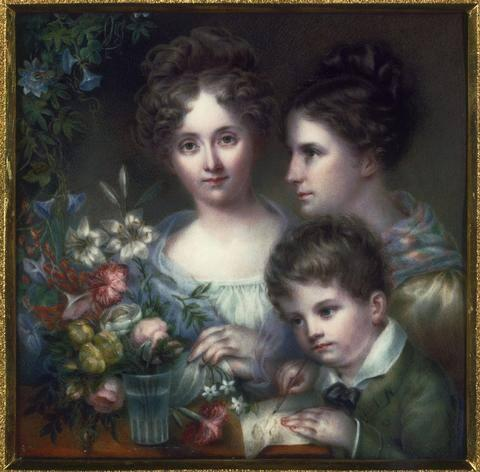
Ann Hall, Her Sister Eliza Hall Ward, and Her Nephew Henry Hall Ward, 1828. Miniature on ivory, 4 1/4 x 4 1/4 in., New-York Historical Society, New York, New York

== Education and early career ==
Hall visited the home of her mother's family in Newport, Rhode Island with an elder sister. There she learned to sketch and paint in oil and make miniatures in watercolors on ivory from the Samuel King, one of the teachers of Gilbert Stuart.

In about 1808, Hall traveled to New York City to study oil painting with Alexander Robertson. During her tenure in his studio, she viewed the temporary exhibition of old master paintings from the collection of Colonel John Trumbull, painter and private secretary to John Jay, which had been amassed when Trumbull was active in London and Paris. Hall also studied the old masters in the collection of her brother Charles Henry Hall, a businessman who frequently traveled to Europe and acquired a group of watercolors, portrait miniatures, and oil paintings while abroad, including a series of copies after original compositions by Italian masters such as Tintoretto and Guido Reni. As Charlotte Streifer Rubinstein has observed, what has been described by critics as the "glowing 'old master' color" of her miniatures resulted from her close study of early modern art. Her interest in old master painting also inspired her to adapt complex multi-figured compositional elements derived from European religious paintings to group portraits; as one of her early biographers noted, her portraits of children resembled "elegant and well-arranged bouquet[s]."

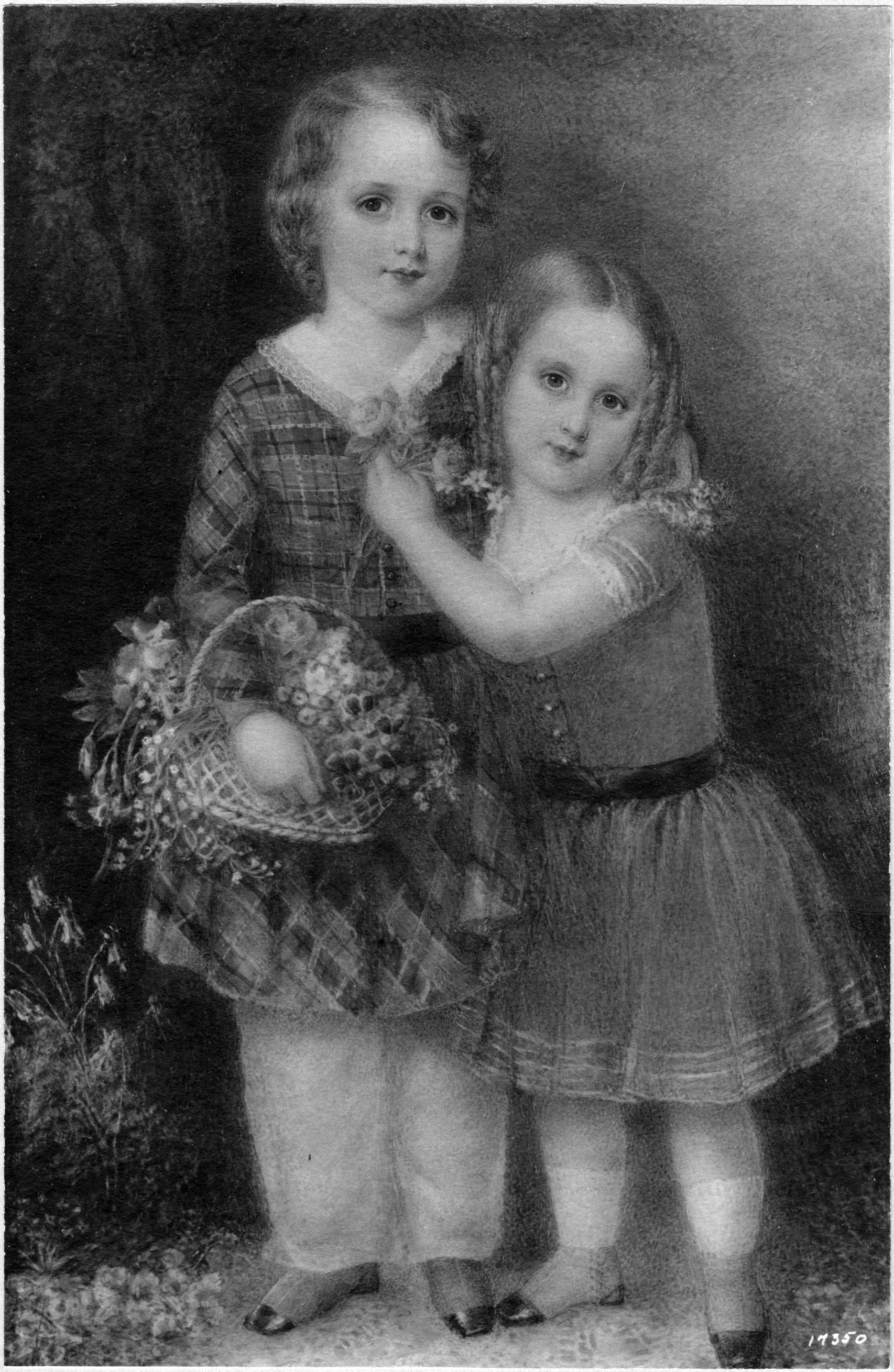
John and Prescott Ward, 1848. Miniature, 7 1/4 x 5 in. Private collection, Hillsborough, California

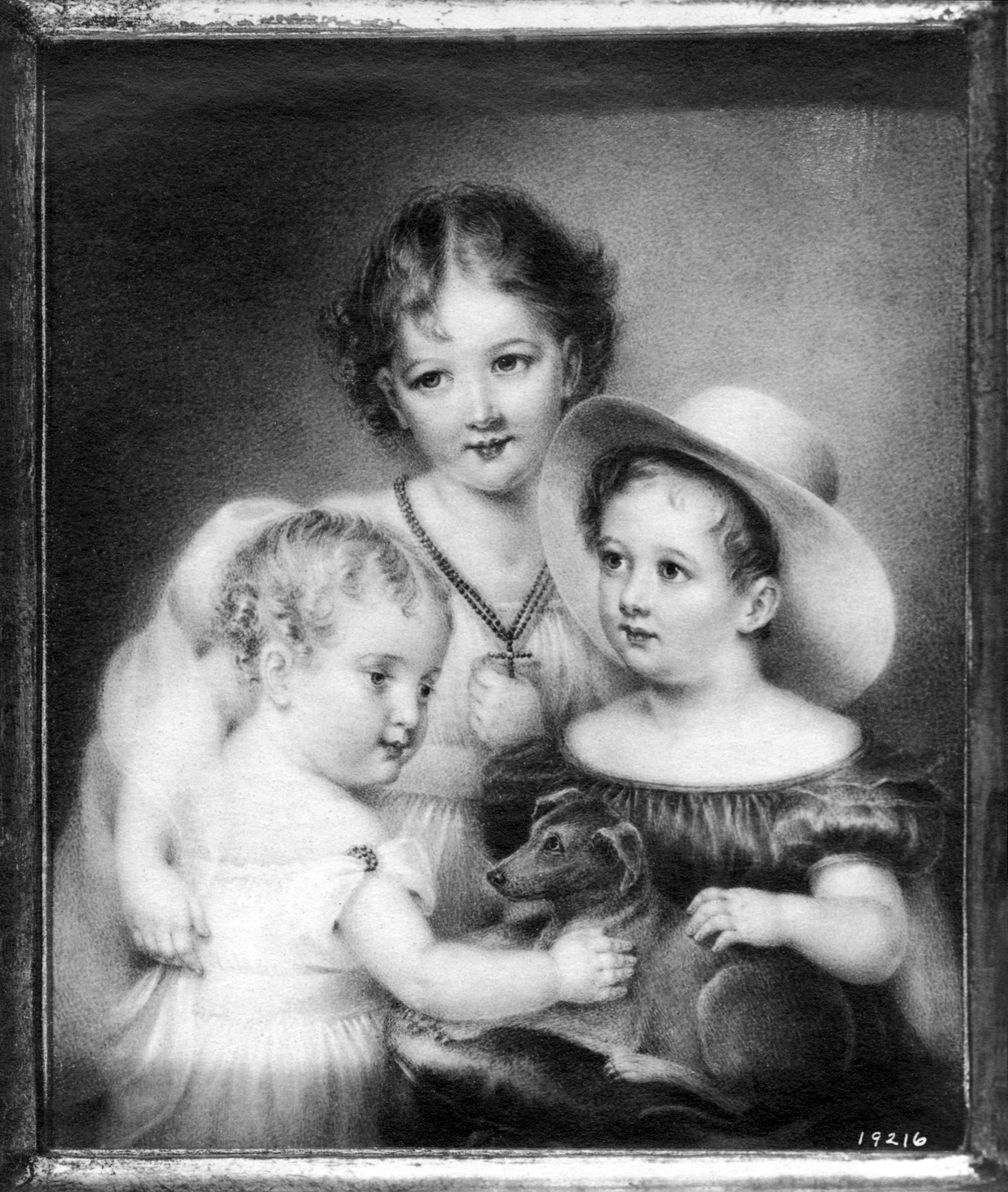
Cornelia, Edward, and Nathaniel Prime, undated. Miniature on ivory, 4 5/8 x 3 7/8 in. Private collection, New York, New York

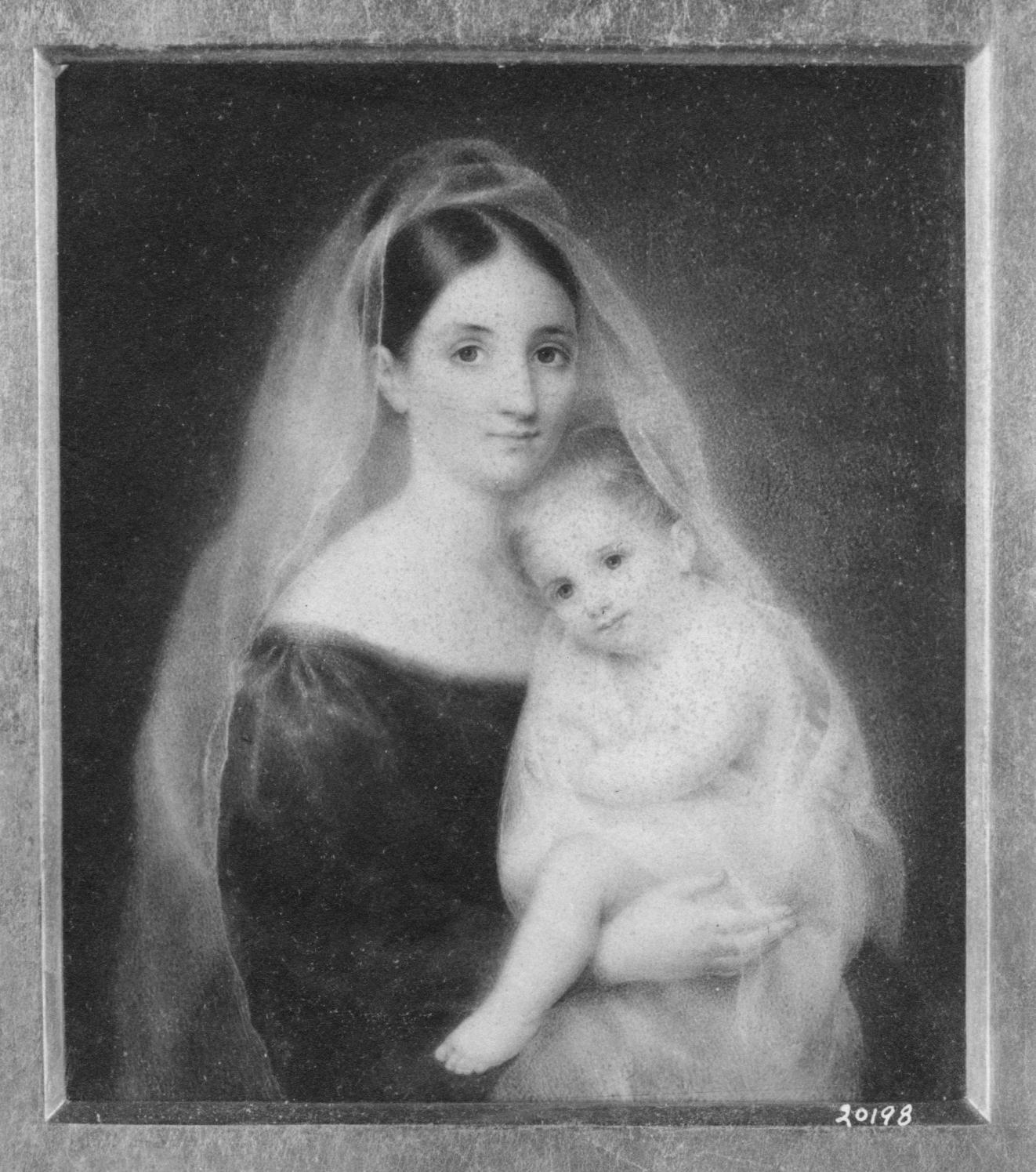
Laura Prime (Mrs. John Clarkson Jay) and Her Daughter, Laura (Mrs. Charles Pemberton Wurts), undated. Miniature on ivory, 4 1/2 x 4 in. Private collection, Englewood, New Jersey

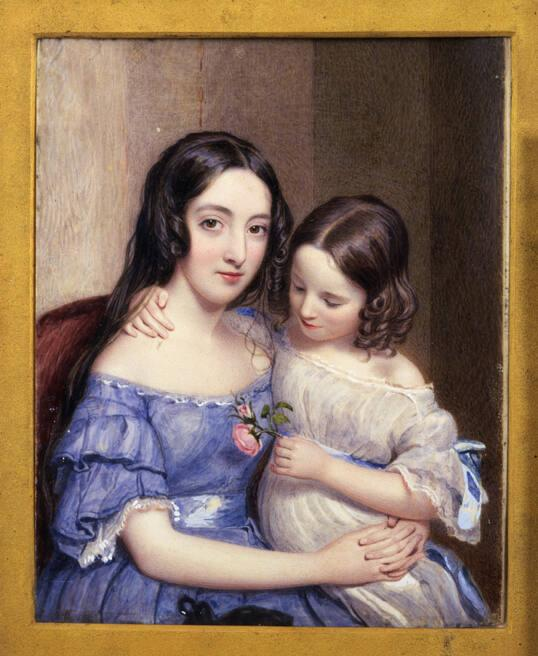
Louisa and Eliza Macardy, c.1845. Miniature on ivory, 4 7/16 x 6 1/16 in. The New-York Historical Society, New York, New York

== Career ==
By 1817, Hall was participating in exhibitions at the American Academy of the Fine Arts. Most of her early submissions were miniatures depicting family members, such as the group portrait "Ann Hall, Her Sister Eliza Hall Ward, and Her Nephew Henry Hall Ward" of 1828 presently in the collection of the New-York Historical Society. During the mid-1820s, she moved to New York City. She lived with her sister Eliza Hall Ward, who also was a painter of note, and Eliza's husband, Henry Ward, at their mansion at 23 Bond Street, although Hall made frequent trips to Boston. Eliza's home was a center of culture as well as the meeting place of the Hone Club. Many of the New York City luminaries of the 1820s, 1830s, and 1840s who visited Eliza and her husband posed for Ann, expanding the artist's circle of patrons and supporters.

Hall was admitted to the recently established National Academy of Design as an associate member in 1828 and five years later she was elected—by a unanimous vote—to full membership, the first woman to achieve this honor and the only woman to be admitted to the academy before 1900. She was not encouraged to take an active role in the governance of the institution, however, and never appeared at Academy meetings except on one occasion when her presence was requested to meet a quorum. Yet she continued to exhibit in the institution's annual exhibitions until 1852, and a popular engraving produced by E. Gallaudet was made after Hall's miniature of Garafilia Mohalbi. Mohalbi had been captured at the age of seven by the Turks during the Greek War of Independence and was ransomed by an American merchant who had her brought to Boston in 1827 to be raised with his family. Mohalbi died in 1830 at the age of 13.

She had a studio on the top floor of her sister's house and mostly made portraits of women and children. Her clients were wealthy residents of New York who paid her up to $500 per commission. Her works were praised by critics of her day, including author and historian William Dunlap:

Her later portraits in miniature are of the first order, I have seen groups of children composed with the taste and skill of a master, and the delicacy which the female character can infuse into works of beauty beyond the reach of man.

— William Dunlap
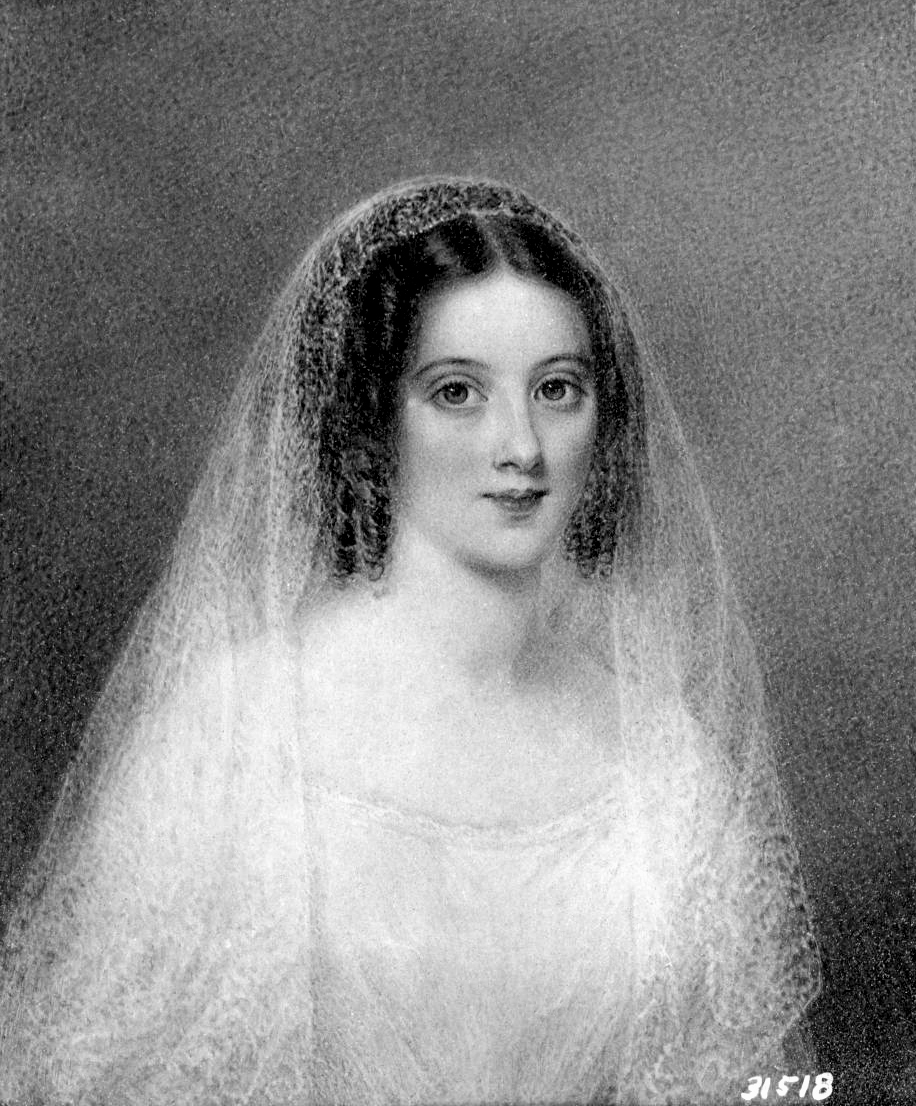
Frances Ann Clarkson Goodhue (Mrs. Robert Livingston), 1834. Miniature on ivory, 3 3/4 x 3 1/8 in. New York Society Library, New York, New York

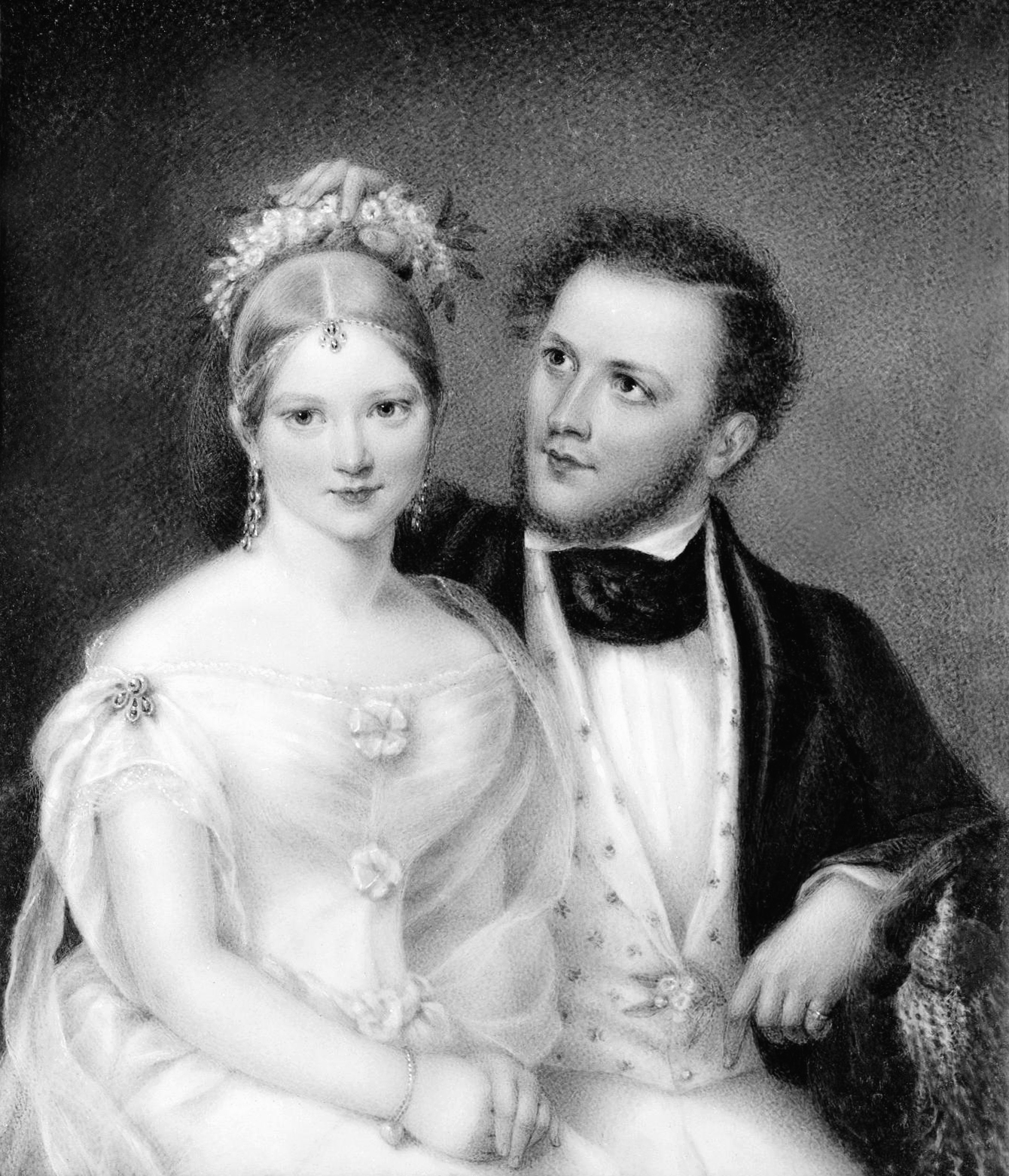
Mr. and Mrs. Samuel Ward (Emily Astor), 1837. Miniature on ivory, 5 1/2 x 4 1/2 in. Private collection, Barrytown, New York

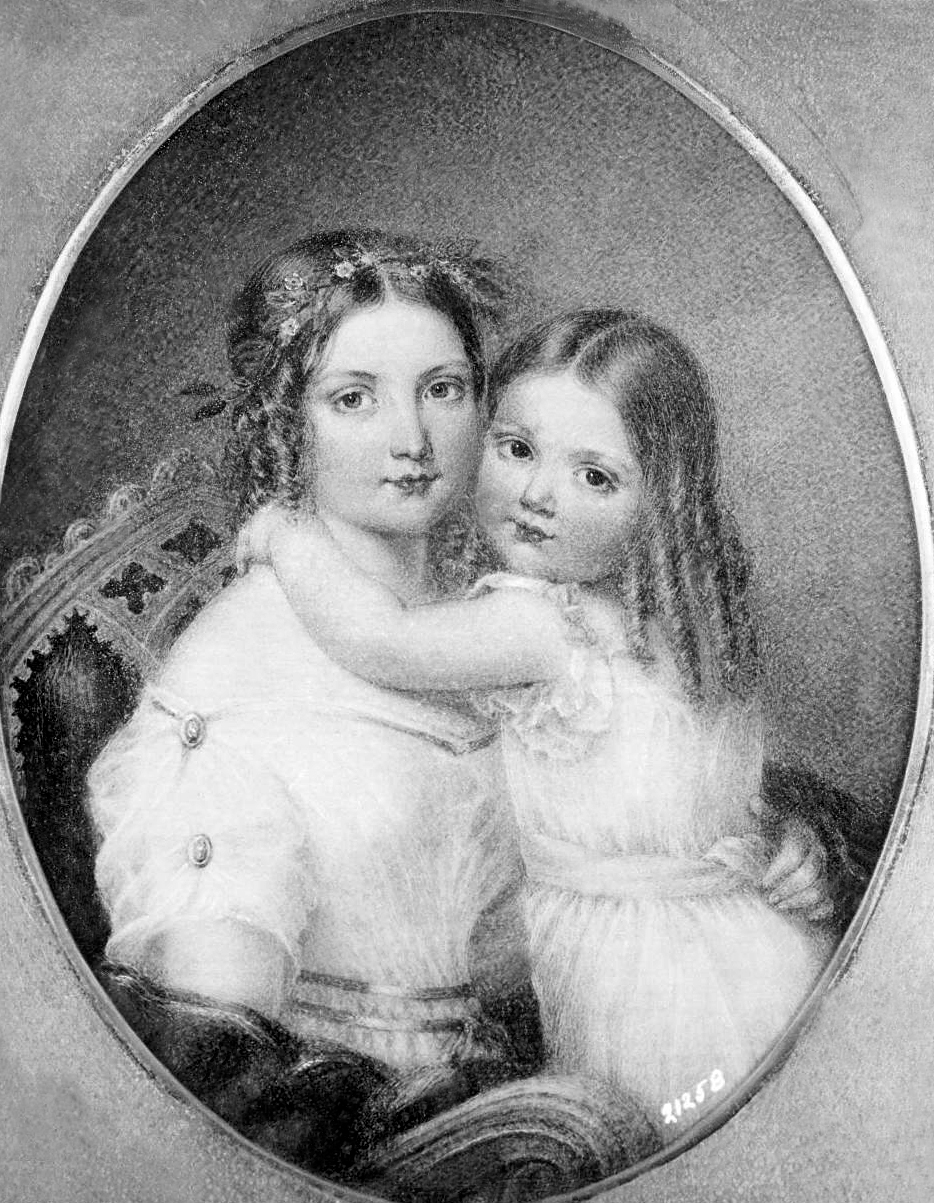
Mrs. John Barber James (Mary Helen Vanderburgh) and Her Daughter Mary Helen James (Mrs. Charles Alfred Grymes), undated. Miniature on ivory, 4 3/4 x 3 5/8 in. Private collection, Washington, D.C.

== Death ==
Hall never married and died on December 11, 1863, in her sister's house, which became known as the Henry Hall Ward Mansion during the lifetime of Eliza's son. She was interred at Green-Wood Cemetery in Brooklyn, New York. It is estimated that Hall left her heirs an estate of $100,000, a fortune earned solely through commissions. Although surviving letters suggest that several amateur miniaturists petitioned to study in her studio, no students are recorded. Interest in her work was revived when the Henry Hall Ward Mansion was auctioned in December 1904 and several of her miniatures were discovered stored in the mansion's attic.

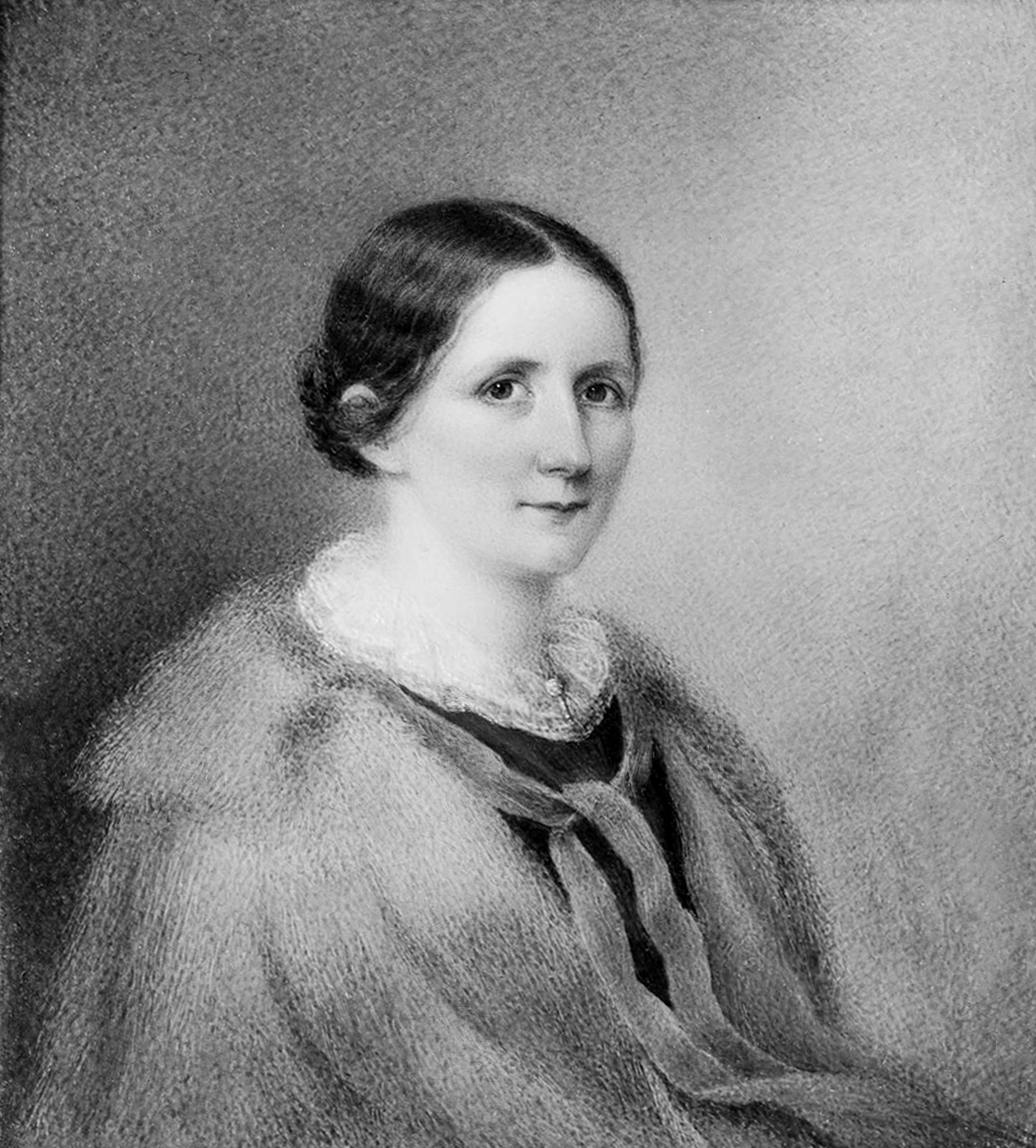
The Artist's Sister, Eliza Hall Ward, undated. Miniature on ivory, 4 1/4 x 3 3/4 in. On the art market in November 1946

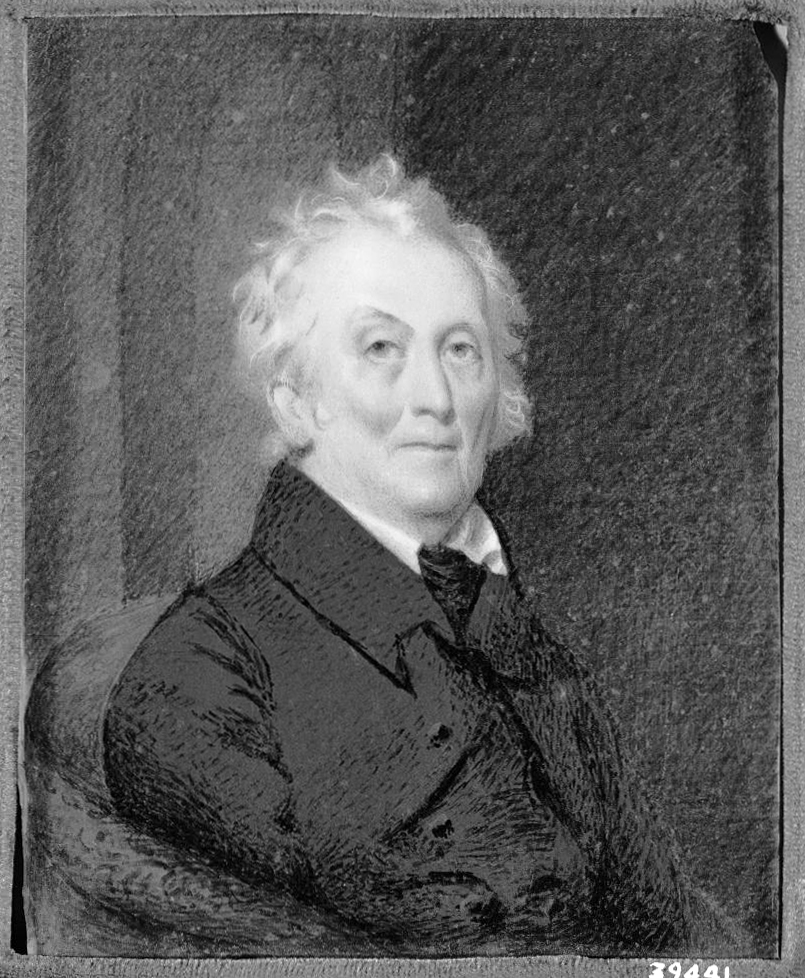
John Trumbull,1840. Miniature on ivory, 3 1/8 x 2 1/2 in. Private collection, Darien, Connecticut

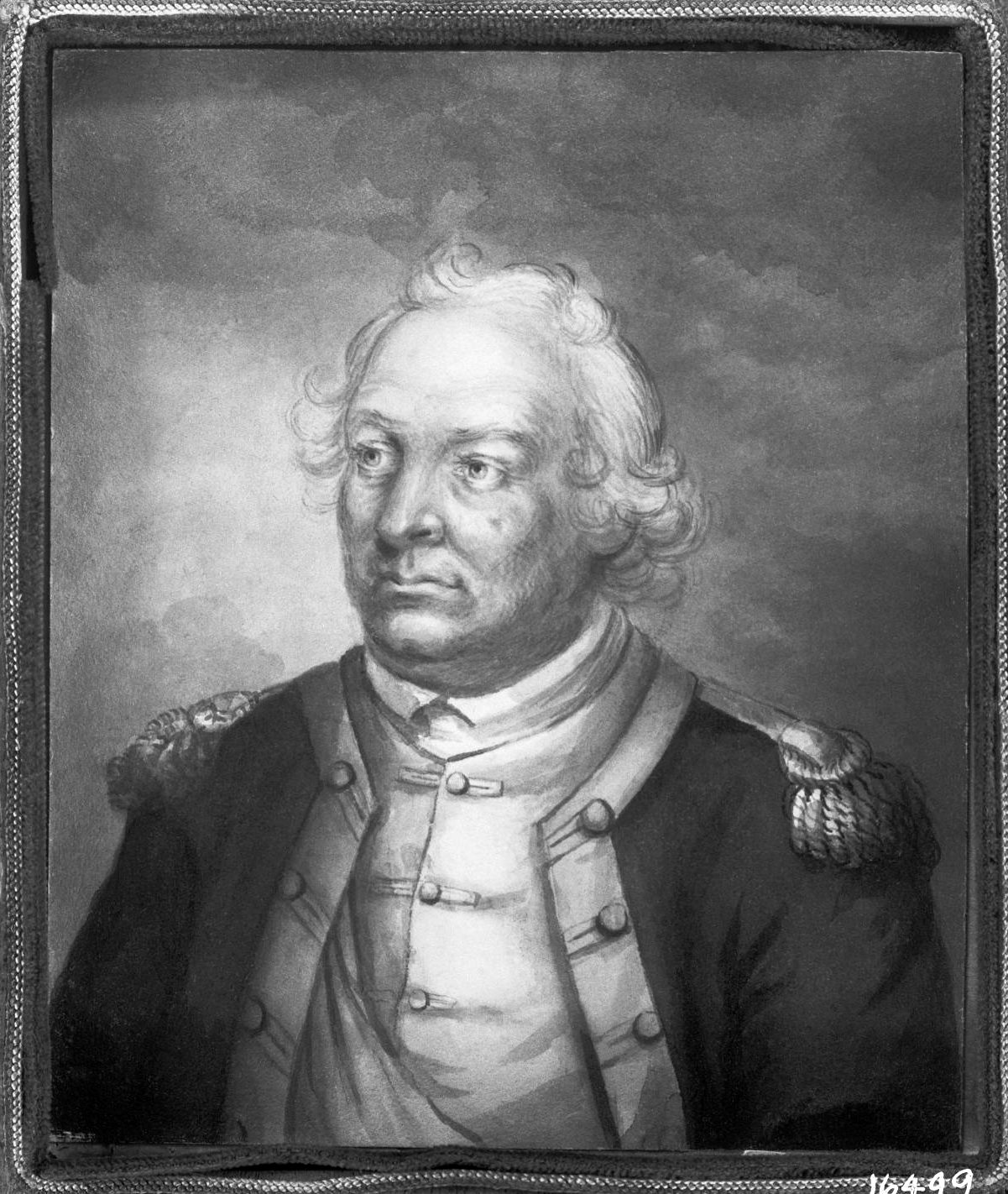
General Israel Putnam (copy after painting by John Trumbull), undated. Watercolor and sepia wash on parchment, 4 1/2 x 3 1/2 in. Unlocated

== Sources ==
- Metropolitan Museum of Art (New York, N.Y.); Carrie Rebora Barratt; Lori Zabar (January 1, 2010). American Portrait Miniatures in the Metropolitan Museum of Art. Metropolitan Museum of Art. p. 133. ISBN 978-1-58839-357-9.
- Dunlap, William (1918). A History of the Rise and Progress of the Arts of Design in the United States (revised ed.). Vol. 3. Boston: C.E. Goodspeed & Co.
- "End of Old Estate: Three Dwellings, Including the Famous Ward Mansion, to Be Sold at Auction". The Globe and Commercial Advertiser. December 14, 1904.
- Ellet, Elizabeth Fries (1859). Women Artists in All Ages and Countries. Richard Bentley.
- Hale, Sarah Josepha Buell (1874). Woman's Record: Or, Sketches of All Distinguished Women, from the Creation to A.D. 1868. Arranged in Four Eras, with Selections from Authoresses of Each Era. Harper.
- Kort, Carol; Sonneborn, Liz (January 1, 2002). A to Z of American Women in the Visual Arts. Infobase Publishing. pp. 90–91. ISBN 978-1-4381-0791-2.
- Larned, Ellen Douglas (1899). Historic gleanings in Windham County, Connecticut. Preston and Rounds company. p. 216.
- McCabe, Lida Rose (May 28, 1905). "Anne Hall, Miniaturist, First American Woman 'N. A.'". The New York Times. p. 35 – via Internet Archive.
- Metropolitan Museum (2000). "Attributed to Anne Hall: Mrs. William Beekman Ver Planck and Her Son William Beekman Ver Planck (67.263)". In Heilbrunn Timeline of Art History. New York: The Metropolitan Museum of Art.
- Rubinstein, Charlotte Streifer (1982). American Women Artists: From the Early Indian Times to the Present. G.K. Hall. p. 43. ISBN 9780816185351.
- Commemorative Biographical Record of Tolland and Windham Counties, Connecticut. J.H. Beers & Co. 1903 – via Google Books.
