= James Jakob Williams =

African-American runaway slave and marine

- Born: 1785–1800; Baltimore, Maryland
- Died: 1829; Argos, Greece
- Burial place: Agios Ioannis in Argos
- Military career
- Allegiance: United States (Greece) First Hellenic Republic
- Branch: United States Navy; Hellenic Navy
- Rank: Private sharpshooter
- Conflicts: Second Barbary War: Battle off Cape Gata; Battle of Cape Palos; Greek War of Independence: Battle of Itea

James Jakob Williams (Greek:Τζέιμς Τζέικομπ Γουίλλιαμς; 1785/1800–1829) was an African-American runaway slave and soldier. He took part in the Second Barbary War as a member of the US Navy and later alongside the Greek revolutionaries during the Greek War of Independence. Williams was severely injured fighting for the Greek cause and was discovered by American abolitionist and philhellene Jonathan Peckham Miller. Miller brought Williams to his home in Poros where he properly recovered and lived out the rest of his life as a free man in Greece.

== Early life ==
Williams was born on a plantation in Baltimore, Maryland. He was a slave during his early life and managed to escape and hide on the American warship the USS Guerriere when it was part of the Delaware Flotilla during the War of 1812. The ship was actively participating in battles near Baltimore. Around 1815, the USS Guerriere was under the command of Stephen Decatur and was part of the Mediterranean Squadron. Williams was discovered on the American warship and he eventually participated in several battles as a sharp-shooting marine taking part in the Second Barbary War in the Battle off Cape Gata and Battle of Cape Palos alongside Decatur. The war lasted two days from June 17 until June 19, 1815, and Williams lost one of his fingers during the campaign. Decatur allowed Williams to leave his ship and he found refuge aboard different European vessels by the late 1820s, he was a cook aboard Lord Thomas Cochrane's ship.

== Greek War of Independence ==
Cochrane actively participated in the Greek War of Independence and Frank Abney Hastings was under his command. Due to the lack of military personnel, Williams volunteered to assist in the Greek cause. He joined a small squadron consisting of a brig and two small gunboats led by the flagship Karteria commanded by Hastings. The Karteria was the first steamship involved in combat. Williams participated in the Battle of Itea which took place in the Gulf of Corinth, formerly known as the Gulf of Lepanto, around September 1827; consequently, he was seriously injured by a cannon fire breaking his arms and legs in the process. He was eventually discovered in a hospital by American abolitionist and philhellene Jonathan Peckham Miller and brought to his home in Poros to recover. Miller gave him a double suit around December 21, 1827, and wrote about the brave African-American in his journal. Williams lived out the rest of his life in Greece. His tombstone is at the cemetery of Agios Ioannis in Argos.

Williams has been honored by countless Greek organizations including the Society for Hellenism and Philhellenism (EEF) and the AHEPA.

== Bibliography ==
- Clinton, William J. (2001). Public Papers of the Presidents of the United States, William J. Clinton Book 2. Washington D.C.: United States Government Printing Press.
- Miller, Jonathan P. (1828). The Condition of Greece in 1827 and 1828. New York, NY: J. & J. Harper.
- Oren, Michael B. (2007). Power, Faith, and Fantasy America in the Middle East, 1776 to the Present. New York, NY: W.W. Norton Company. ISBN 9780393058260.
- Stephens, John Lloyd (1838). Incidents of Travel in Greece, Turkey, Russia, and Poland Volume 1. New York, NY: Harper & Brothers.
