= The Token and Atlantic Souvenir =

Annual American gift book, published 1826–1842

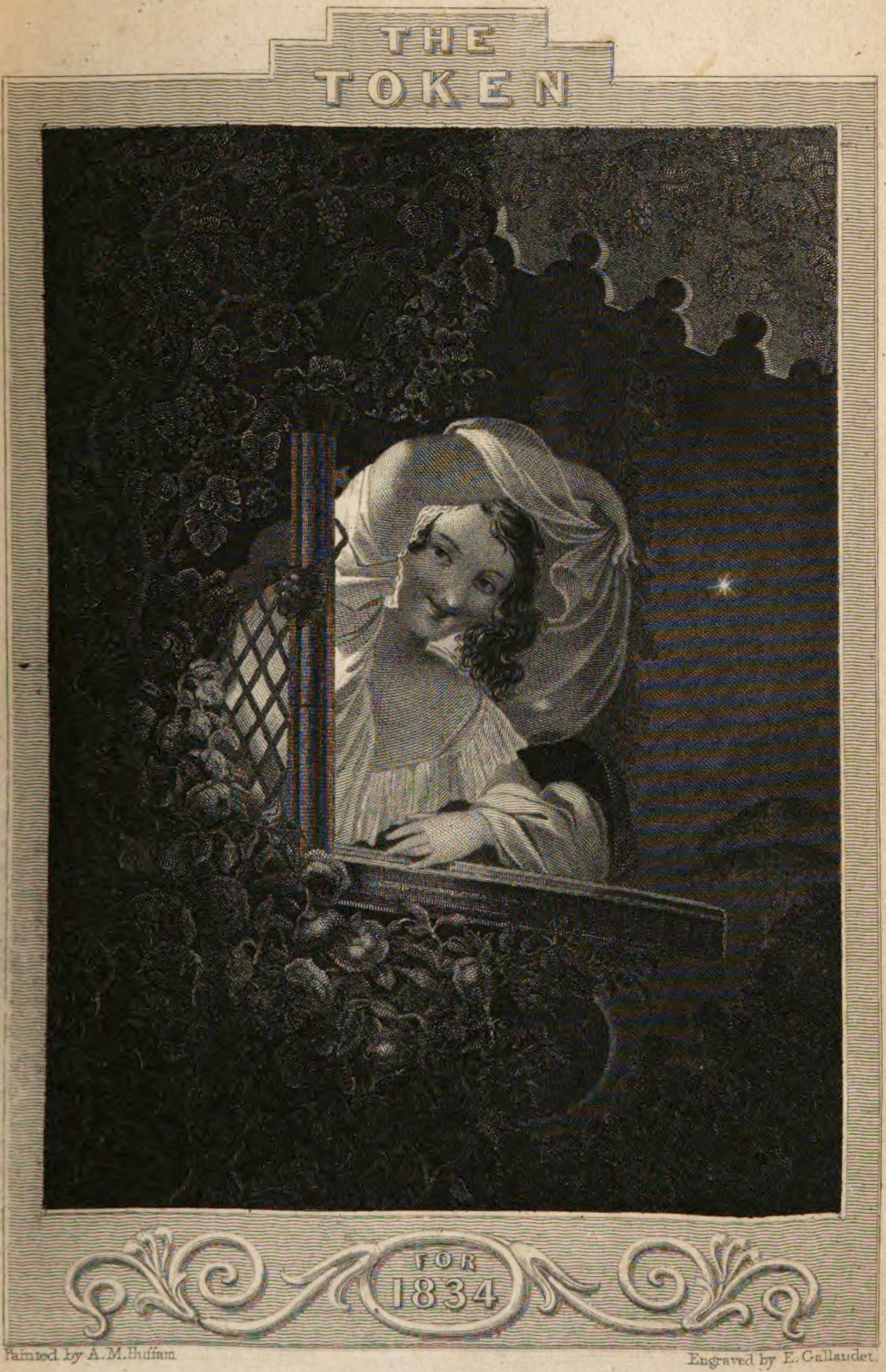
- 1834 frontispiece engraving by Edward Gallaudet
- Editor: Samuel Griswold Goodrich (1828, 1830–1842); Nathaniel Parker Willis (1829)
- Categories: Art and literature
- Frequency: Annual
- Format: Gift book
- Founder: Samuel Griswold Goodrich
- First issue: 1828
- Final issue: 1842
- Based in: Boston, Massachusetts, US

The Token and Atlantic Souvenir (1826–1842) was the first American gift book, featuring romantic and sentimental short stories, poems, and essays, as well as copies of original paintings. Published annually, it was founded separately in Philadelphia as The Atlantic Souvenir in 1826 and in Boston as The Token in 1828. The titles merged with the 1833 volume, retaining The Token's founding editor, Samuel Griswold Goodrich. Readers generally referred to the merged publication as The Token. Considered by scholars to be one of America's best gift books, it was popular, influential, nationally distributed, and critically assessed. Some volumes saw multiple republications under different titles as the gift book industry continued to grow after the last volume of The Token and Atlantic Souvenir in 1842.

Authors published in The Token include leading figures of the day, unknown authors who became famous later, and others who are less remembered by history. The most famous is Nathaniel Hawthorne, though he was unknown at the time, poorly paid, and uncredited.

Featured artists were disproportionately American and their paintings largely followed romantic themes. The best remembered is Pat Lyon at the Forge by John Neagle. The paintings were rendered as engravings, many of them by leading American engraver John Cheney. These engravings attracted attention from contemporary critics like John Neal of The Yankee and are considered notable by modern scholars.

== Description ==
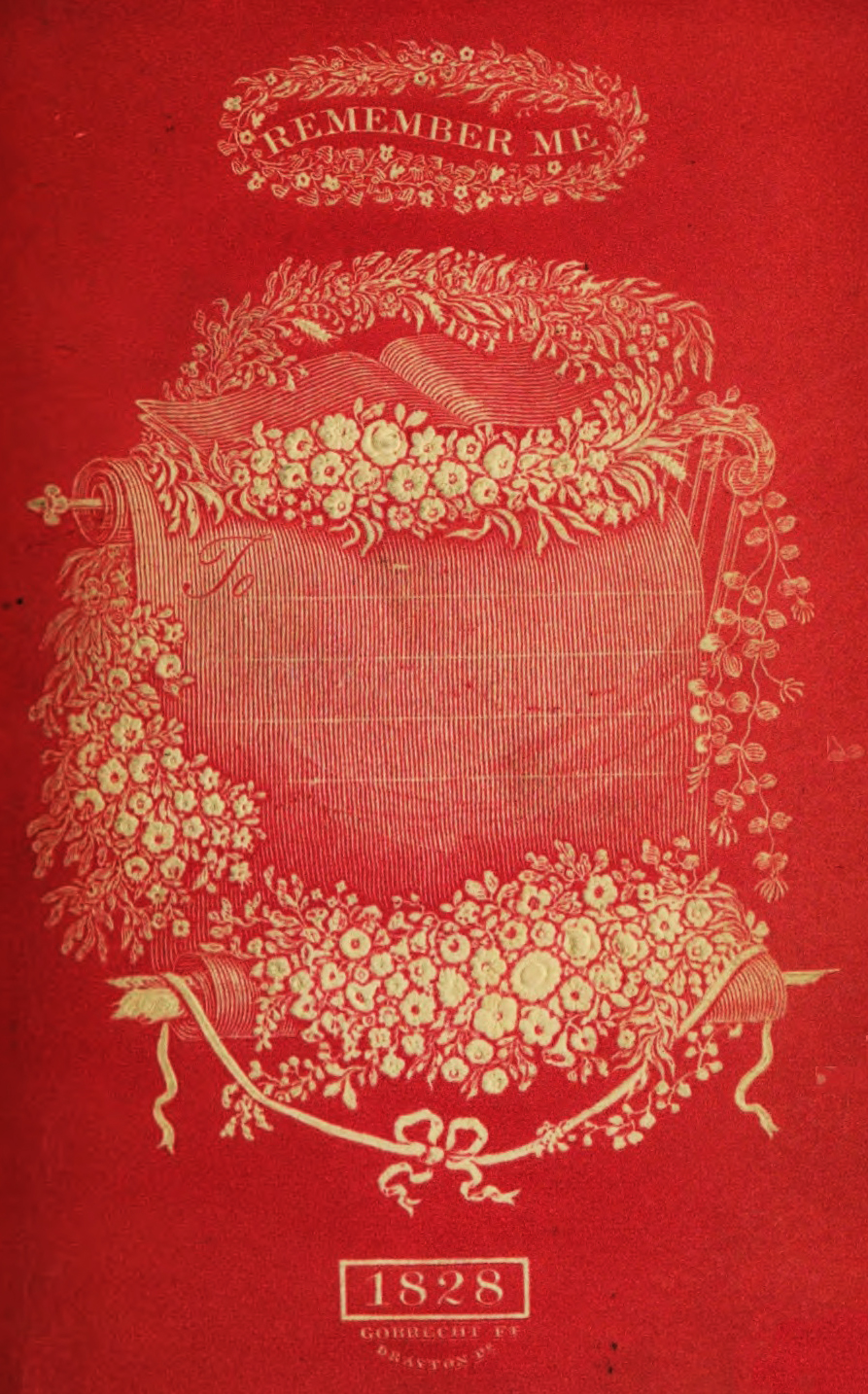
Inscription page, Atlantic Souvenir 1828

Like other gift books, The Token and The Atlantic Souvenir were typically given as Christmas gifts, with the names of the giver and recipient elaborately inscribed within. The volumes typically featured a decorative cover and quality binding. The pages were filled with poems, short stories, essays, and engravings following romantic and sentimental themes. According to American studies professor Pat Pflieger, "the prose tended to be lightly humorous and delicately edifying. Most of what appeared in The Token was innocuous." To attract buyers, the detailed table of contents was complemented by a "list of embellishments" that outlined the featured engravings. The gift books enjoyed national distribution and wide acceptance with readers.

== Publication history ==
Published annually, gift books were first introduced in Germany, where the trend migrated to the UK and later to the US. Scholars consider The Atlantic Souvenir, first published in 1826, to be the first American gift book, though some similarly illustrated publications predate it in that country. It was published in Philadelphia by H.C. Carey & I. Lea.

The Token was first published in Boston in 1828 by Samuel Griswold Goodrich, with later volumes by Gray & Bowen and other publishers. All volumes were edited by Goodrich, with the exception of the second volume, which was edited by Nathaniel Parker Willis. Willis was paid $200 for the job. The Atlantic Souvenir was The Token's top competitor, published separately through 1832. When Goodrich purchased The Atlantic Souvenir, he published the first volume of The Token and Atlantic Souvenir in 1833. Goodrich stayed on as editor and the combined publication was still generally referred to as The Token. In total, the series produced twenty-two volumes: seven as The Atlantic Souvenir from 1826 through 1832, five as The Token from 1828 through 1832, and ten as The Token and Atlantic Souvenir from 1833 through 1842.

Though the final volume of The Token and Atlantic Souvenir was published in 1842, the title was co-opted by a New York publisher for a cheaper, short-lived gift book in the late 1850s. The 1840 volume of The Token and Atlantic Souvenir was republished with minor changes and marketed by two different publishers in 1848 under the titles Honeysuckle and Moss Rose. The same volume appeared again in 1853 as Token of Friendship and Friendship's Gift. In total, it was republished at least five times. Cairns considers the 1838 volume to be one of the best; it was republished at least ten times by various publishers.

The Token and Atlantic Souvenir appeared annually over seventeen years, when dating from the older Atlantic Souvenir title. That is one year less than the longest-running gift book, The Rose of Sharon. The vast majority of gift books saw only one volume. Though no other American gift books existed when The Atlantic Souvenir was first published, there were twelve or thirteen different titles available at the time it merged with The Token. The industry peaked about a decade after The Token ceased annual publication, when there were sixty-six titles. American gift book production had largely collapsed by 1861.

== Literary contributors ==
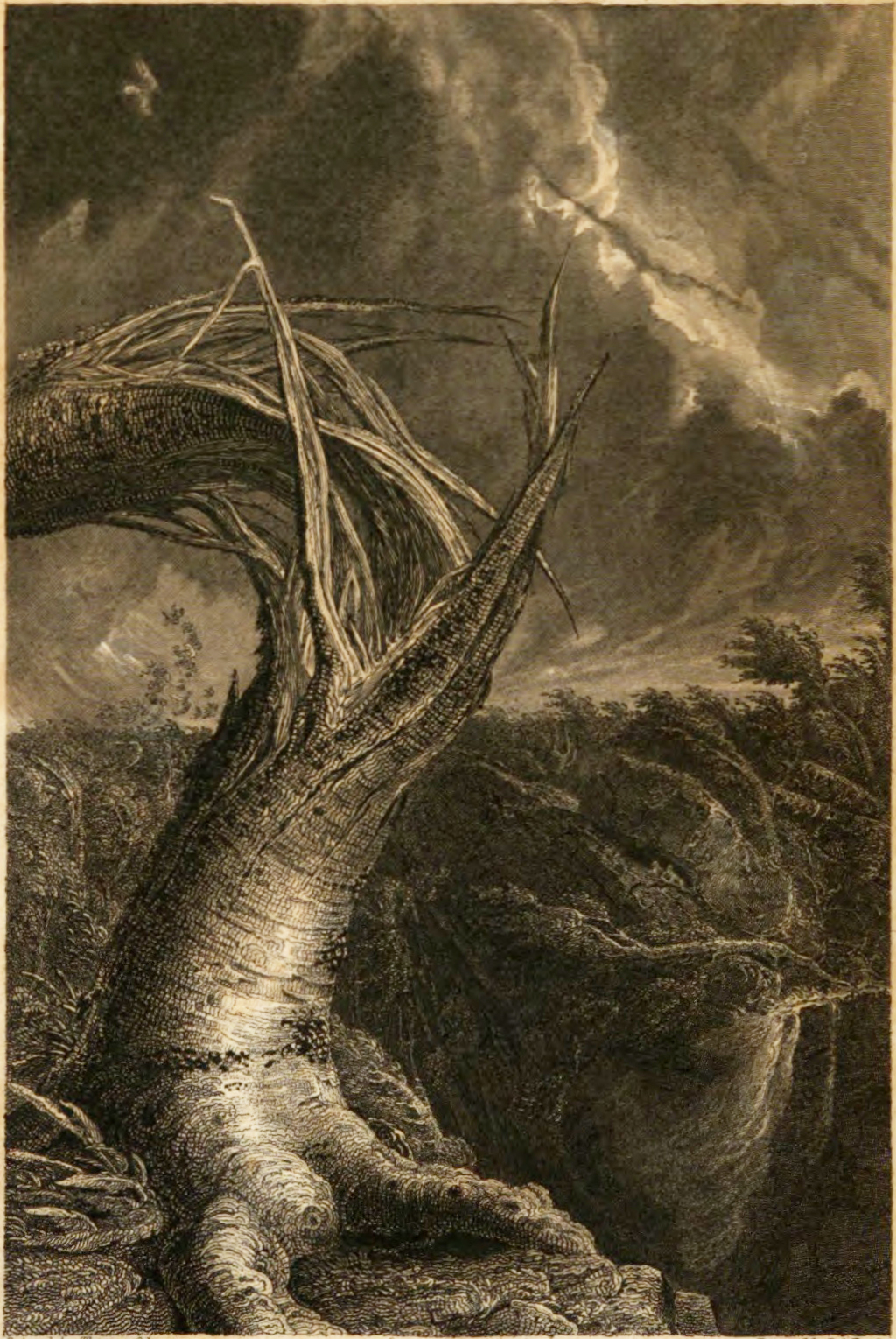
The Whirlwind by Thomas Cole; engraved by Edward Gallaudet for The Token and Atlantic Souvenir (1837)

Contributors to The Atlantic Souvenir and The Token included leading literary figures of the day, some who gained their fame later on, and others less remembered by history. As editor, Goodrich secured poems, stories, and essays from himself, Nathaniel Hawthorne, Nathaniel Parker Willis, Catharine Sedgwick, Henry Wadsworth Longfellow, Lydia Maria Child, Oliver Wendell Holmes Sr., James Russell Lowell, John Neal, Lydia Sigourney, and others.

=== Hawthorne ===
After the failure of his first novel, Fanshawe (1828), Hawthorne turned to short story writing, likely because he saw growth in the gift book industry. Largely unknown at the time, he began sending tales to Goodrich in the spring of 1829. Goodrich published twenty-six of his stories between 1830 and 1838: at least one in every volume during that time span save 1834, and eight stories in 1837 alone. These include several of Hawthorne's notable early works, such as "My Kinsman, Major Molineux" (1832), "The Minister's Black Veil" (1836), and "The Man of Adamant" (1837). To imply a greater number of contributors, the 1837 volume's table of contents attributes Hawthorne's stories variably to "the author of Sights from the Steeple", "the author of The Wives of the Dead", "the author of The Gentle Boy", and so on. Scholars in the modern day tend to blame Goodrich for underpaying and abusing the younger author.

Goodrich claimed he sought Hawthorne's work after reading an anonymous work of his, possibly Fanshawe. The stories were published anonymously but proved popular. It wasn't until 1837 that Hawthorne's friend Horatio Bridge in The Boston Post revealed him as the author. Bridge wrote: "It is a singular fact that, of the few American writers by profession, one of the very best is a gentleman whose name has never yet been made public, though his writings are extensively and favorably known." In time, Hawthorne proved to be the most famous of all The Token's contributors.

=== Neal ===
Willis sought contributions from fellow Portland, Maine, native John Neal during his short tenure as editor of The Token. Neal went on to publish tales and essays in six volumes of The Token between 1829 and 1836, as well as The Atlantic Souvenir for 1832. "Otter-Bag, the Oneida Chief" (1829) and "David Whicher" (1832) are considered by literature scholar Benjamin Lease to be his best short stories. Both feature American Indian characters and were written in response to Andrew Jackson's anti-Indian policies. "David Whicher" was published anonymously, and was not recognized as Neal's work until the 1960s. "The Haunted Man" (1832) is recognized as the first work of fiction to incorporate psychotherapy. The essay "Children—What Are They?" (1835) explored the nature of children and proved to be very popular, seeing republication multiple times. "The Adventurer" (1831) is a fictionalized version of John Dunn Hunter's biography, based mostly on what Neal learned living in the same London boarding house in the 1820s.

=== Longfellow ===
Henry Wadsworth Longfellow was a young Bowdoin College professor at the time he contributed to The Token. Those contributions include "The Indian Summer" (1832), "The Bald Eagle" (1833), and "An Evening in Autumn" (1833). They were not included in later collections of Longfellow's poetry and tales, but are generally known to scholars.

== Art ==
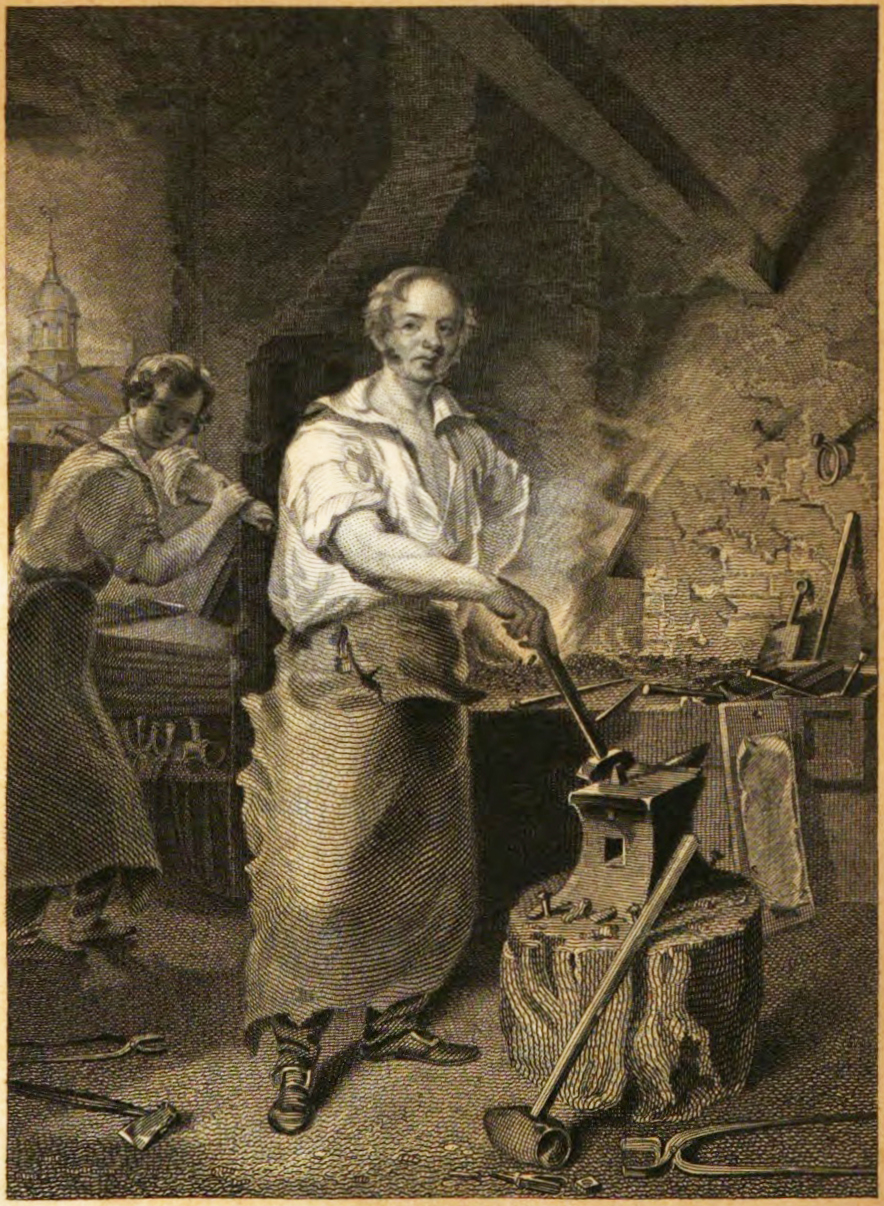
Pat Lyon at the Forge

Gift books are remembered primarily as vehicles for literature, but they are also notable for the art they published via engraving. Gift books made it possible for paintings to reach a much wider audience than the minority of Americans who had access to galleries and museums in the 1820s, 30s, and 40s. Each volume included copies of eight-to-twelve works of art, each typically taking up an entire page. The editors of The Token and The Atlantic Souvenir featured primarily American painters, which was significant given how few painters the country had at the time. Eschewing portraiture, the editors favored landscapes with romantic themes like democracy, individualism, sentiment, humor, and frontier. Paintings by Alvan Fisher were featured the most, followed by John Gadsby Chapman, Thomas Doughty, Charles Robert Leslie, Gilbert Stuart Newton, George Loring Brown, Henry Inman, Thomas Cole, Robert W. Weir, Washington Allston, Thomas Birch, William G. Wall, John Neagle, Asher B. Durand, Samuel F.B. Morse, and John Wollaston. The most famous of these paintings was Neagle's Pat Lyon at the Forge (1832). All but Wollaston were active at the time their works were featured in the gift books.

John Cheney is among the engravers hired by the editors to copy paintings for publication. Considered by bibliographer Frederick Winthrop Faxon to be the country's leading portrait engraver, his work was featured in the 1828 volume, as well as every volume from 1830 through 1838. For part of Cheney's career, his only form of employment was producing engravings for The Token.

== Reception ==
Literature scholar Kermit Vanderbilt wrote that The Token was "a major influence in American literature". It was "one of the most remarkable of the annuals published in this country" during the period, according to book critic Ralph Thompson. Literature scholar William B. Cairns considered its literary content to be among the best found in American gift books of the era. Lease called it the most successful literary annual of the 1830s and 1840s.

At the time they were published, the gift books attracted critical attention commensurate with other book-length literature. In The Yankee literary journal, John Neal published extensive reviews of the earlier volumes of both The Token and The Atlantic Souvenir , critiquing the literature as well as the art. He recommended buying The Token for 1828

if you have a housefull of daughters, or a wife or so of your own; it may lead to something better—it may give them a relish for something higher and bolder, and wiser and truer .... At any rate—if it do nothing more, it will keep them out of mischief.

Historian David S. Lovejoy described Neal's criticism of The Token and Atlantic Souvenir "candid and caustic". In one case, Neal praised a painting from The Token, then updated his opinion on a later issue of The Yankee after seeing it in person: The Prairie on Fire by Fisher "is not half so good a thing as the engraver led me to expect." He similarly praised The Wife by Durand, but felt the engraved copy was better than the original painting. Neal believed American engraving had much room for improvement and encouraged others to support those in the field, stressing how difficult a craft it is: "A long life is to be spent in diligent, exact, and laborious work; a long life in very delicate and careful experiment, before [an engraver] can hope even to see the finer and more wonderful difficulties of their art".
