= William Wall =

William Wall may refer to:

- William Wall (theologian) (1647–1728), British priest in the Church of England who wrote extensively on the doctrine of infant baptism
- William Guy Wall (1792–1864), American painter of Irish birth
- William Wall (New York politician) (1800–1872), U.S. representative from New York
- William Wall (Australian politician) (1845–1926), member of the New South Wales Legislative Assembly
- William Michael Wall (1911–1962), Canadian politician
- William Wall (Wisconsin politician) (1836–1884), member of the Wisconsin State Assembly
- Willie Wall (hurler) (1912–2004), Irish hurler during the late 1930s
- William Wall (writer) (born 1955), Irish novelist, poet and short story writer
- William Wall (cricketer) (1854–1922), English cricketer
- William K. Wall (1786–1853), American lawyer and politician
- William M. Wall (1821–1869), Mormon pioneer, explorer and church leader
- William Archibald Wall (1828–1878), American painter
- William Wall (filmmaker), American filmmaker and cinematographer
- Bill Wall (1931/32–2014), president of the National Association of Basketball Coaches

== See also ==
- William Walls (disambiguation)
