= Alvan Fisher =

American painter (1792–1863)

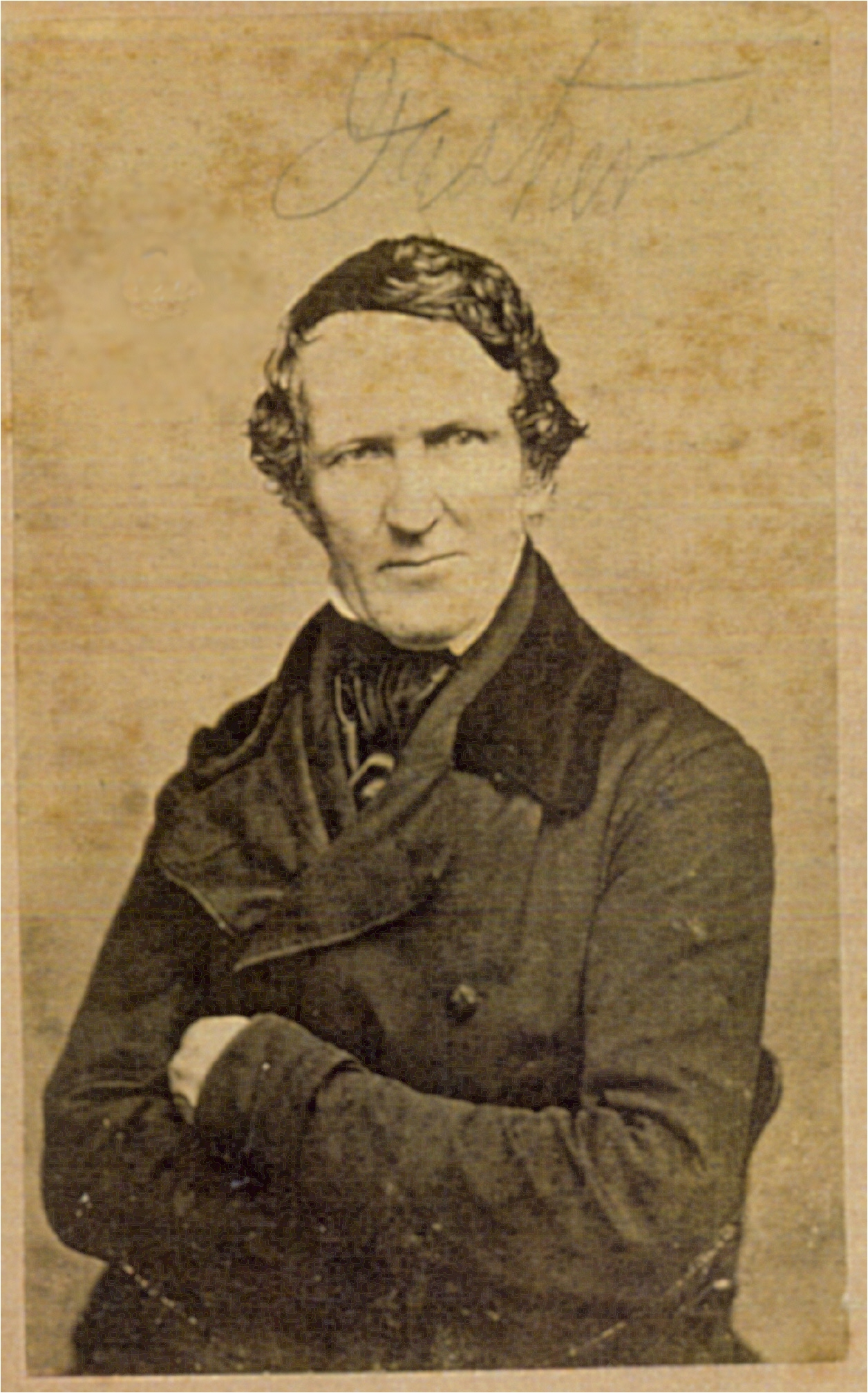
- Alvan Fisher (1792–1863)
- Born: August 9, 1792; Needham, Massachusetts, U.S.
- Died: February 13, 1863 (aged 70)
- Known for: Landscape art

Alvan Fisher (August 9, 1792 – February 13, 1863) was an American landscape and genre painter.

== Early years ==
Alvan Fisher was born in Needham, Massachusetts, the fourth of Aaron and Lucy (Stedman) Fisher's six sons. He moved with members of his family to Dedham, Massachusetts, around 1805 where he worked as a clerk in his brother's store. After that, he always called Dedham his home. At the age of eighteen, he determined, with the support of his family, to become a painter and began an apprenticeship with John Ritto Penniman in Boston, Massachusetts, along with other young artists such as Charles Codman. There he learned portrait painting while assisting Penniman in decorating carriages and painting commercial signs.

== Career ==
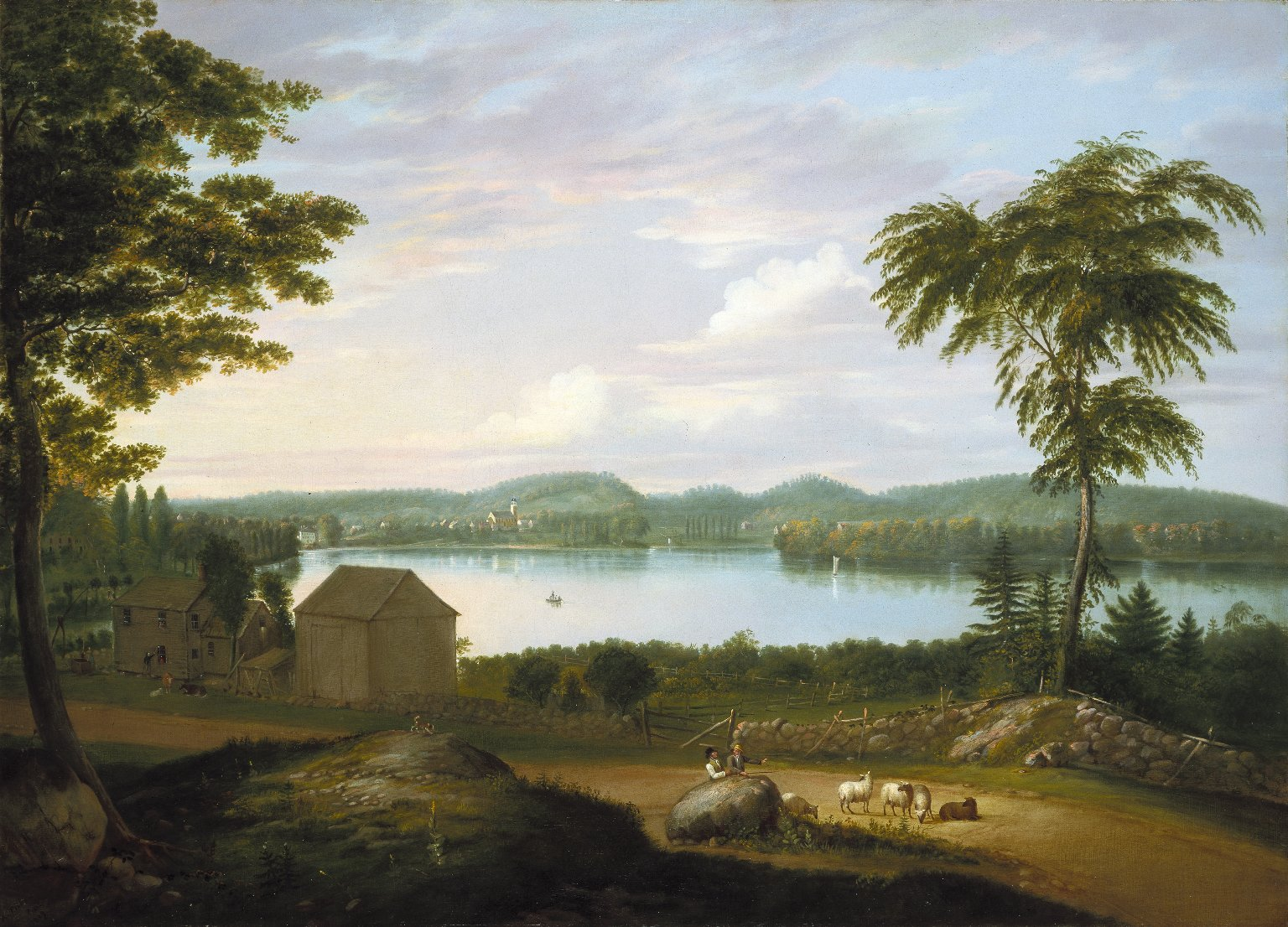
Alvan Fisher (American, 1792–1863). View of Springfield on the Connecticut River, 1819. Oil on canvas. Brooklyn Museum

In 1815, at the age of twenty-two, he began his professional career, opening a studio on School Street in Boston. During his first ten years as a painter, he set the tone of his entire career. He traveled extensively painting landscapes, rural scenes, portraits of animals, and portraits of people. The growing popularity of landscape and genre painting coincided with the growing population of the United States and an economically improved middle class. This was the age of democracy and people wanted art that depicted their own contemporary life. In his book, Mirror to the American Past: A Survey of American Genre Painting, 1750-1900, Herman Warner Williams Jr., wrote, "As our first native-born painter to specialize in genre subjects and to engage a wide audience for them, Alvan Fisher is entitled to more than the slight notice that has been given him .... Only the canny Alvan Fisher was successful in turning a profit from the new themes in his paintings."

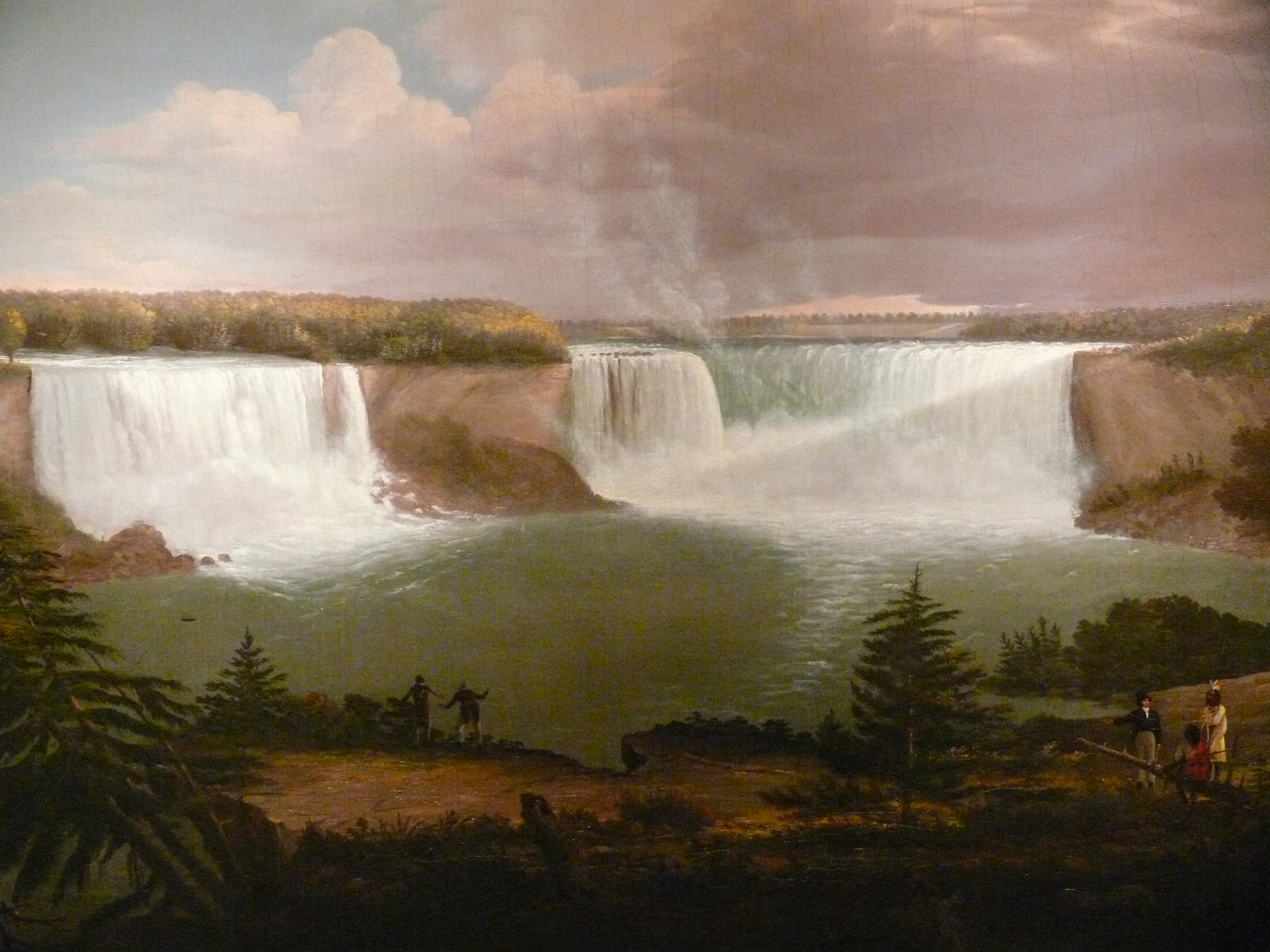
A General View of the Falls of Niagara (1820), Smithsonian American Art Museum.

Fisher traveled throughout the northeastern United States searching out sites of landscape beauty such as the views of Springfield, Hartford, and Providence and the spectacular scenery of the White Mountains of New Hampshire. He sketched outdoors and began to compose pastoral scenes in his studio before Thomas Cole, Thomas Doughty, Asher B. Durand, or others of the Hudson River School gave serious attention to nature. The Watering Place, 1816, now in the collection of Fruitlands Museum, Harvard, Massachusetts, is his earliest extant pure landscape. His paintings of Niagara Falls, commissioned by Judge Daniel Appleton White of Salem, Massachusetts, were completed following his visit there in 1820. His interest in depicting topographical subjects was activated when he obtained a commission to paint views of Harvard College. These paintings were executed expressly for the purpose of issuing engravings for wide distribution to the public. The images of Harvard Yard were later reproduced on Staffordshire transfer-printed earthenware produced by several English companies for the American market. He was commissioned by Charles Henry Hall, owner of the Harlem Stud Farm in New York, to paint portraits of the famous American race horses of the period. He completed at least six portraits of the renowned American Eclipse between 1822 and 1823. Lithograph prints made from these paintings were used in The American Turf Register, the first magazine attempting to improve the breeding of thoroughbred horses in America.

== Grand tour ==
In April, 1825, Fisher sailed for a tour of the great art centers of Europe. He was the first important American landscapist to make such a tour. He visited England, France, Italy and Switzerland – countries considered important for any artist's professional stature and artistic maturation. In London he visited private collections and was inspired by the composition and subject matter of landscapes by Claude Lorrain. In Paris he studied drawing and made copies of works by the Old Masters at the Louvre. While in Paris, he was joined by his younger brother, John Dix Fisher, a graduate of Harvard Medical School who was there to study the effects of smallpox inoculations. (Dr. Fisher is noted for his work on smallpox and was a founder of Perkins School for the Blind in Watertown, Massachusetts.) Also while in Paris, Alvan Fisher undertook a project similar to his views of Harvard College. He had evidently met General Lafayette in 1824 when Lafayette stopped at Dedham during his triumphal tour of the United States. Fisher was granted permission to complete paintings of Chateau La Grange, Lafayette's estate outside Paris. His four views of La Grange were then drawn on lithographic stones in France by the noted lithographer Isadore Deroy, and brought back for printing on one of the first lithographic presses used in the United States. Portfolios of these prints were sold as souvenirs building on the popularity of General Lafayette.

== Later years ==
After his return from Europe in the fall of 1826, Fisher's mature career began. He opened a studio on Washington Street in Boston where he is said to have been the first landscapist to hang out a professional sign in Boston. His friend, the landscapist Thomas Doughty had his studio a few blocks away. In 1827, he was elected into the National Academy of Design as an Honorary Academician. In 1828, the Boston Athenaeum began to purchase paintings for exhibition and bought his Composition from Scenery in the State of New York for $350, then the highest price he had realized for a painting. During the early months of 1834, he joined with Thomas Doughty, Chester Harding, Francis Alexander and other local contributors in opening the Artists' Exhibition at Harding's Gallery where he exhibited forty-three paintings of a variety of subjects—landscapes, genre scenes, portraits, and paintings of marine scenes. This gave the public a unique opportunity to appreciate the breadth of his artistic talent. In 1837, The Massachusetts Charitable Mechanic Association (MCMA) held an arts and crafts fair.(Paul Revere was the first president of the association.) Unlike any previous exhibition in Boston, it appealed to a broad segment of the public who filled the galleries of Faneuil and Quincy Halls to see the exhibits. A critic in the Boston Saturday Evening Gazette wrote, "Fisher has contributed a number of his best compositions, comprising landscapes with groups of figures, barn-yard and cattle scenes, and portraits of children. We cannot ... write a critical notice of such productions, but for variety of style, elegance of design, harmony and richness of coloring, and interesting choice of subjects, Fisher has no superior on this side of the Atlantic." His collection of works received the MCMA's gold medal.

During this period, the frequent publication of his pictures as gift book illustrations was perhaps the most important factor contributing to his growing popularity. These gift books were elegantly decorated and made small so as to fit comfortably in the hand. Engravings of his original paintings were used to illustrate widely circulated American annuals such as The Token, The Garland, The Jewel, The Lily, and The Magnolia. He typified the artist who appealed to the gift book audience. Prominent engraver from Boston Edward Gallaudet was commissioned to make many of his engravings. The Token featured more paintings by Fisher than by any other American artist. Critic John Neal in The Yankee called The Prairie on Fire "excellent" based on Gallaudet's engraving; after seeing it in person, he said the painting "is not half so good a thing as the engraver led me to expect".

In 1840, Fisher and his wife, Lydia (Ellis) Fisher, moved from their townhouse on Beacon Hill in Boston to a house in Dedham near where he had lived as a youth. He had accumulated significant wealth from his artistry and also from his business acumen. He and his brothers had invested in land in Maine and he had also accumulated stocks in textile mills, in copper mines and in railroads. He used this wealth to expand his estate on School Street in Dedham and to establish his studio there. This was the site where he did most of his paintings from the 1850s until his death. He continued to complete portraits as a source of income but his main love was for landscapes and marine scenes. Throughout his career he marketed his works in a variety of ways: he organized auctions to dispose of surplus stock, encouraged clients to buy on installment plans, and placed works on consignment as far away as Mississippi. Mabel Munson Swan states in her article The Unpublished Notebooks of Alvan Fisher, Antiques magazine, August, 1955, "In one of three notebooks ... is a checklist he made of more than one thousand of his paintings, with the names of the purchasers, dates of sale, and prices paid".

== Legacy ==
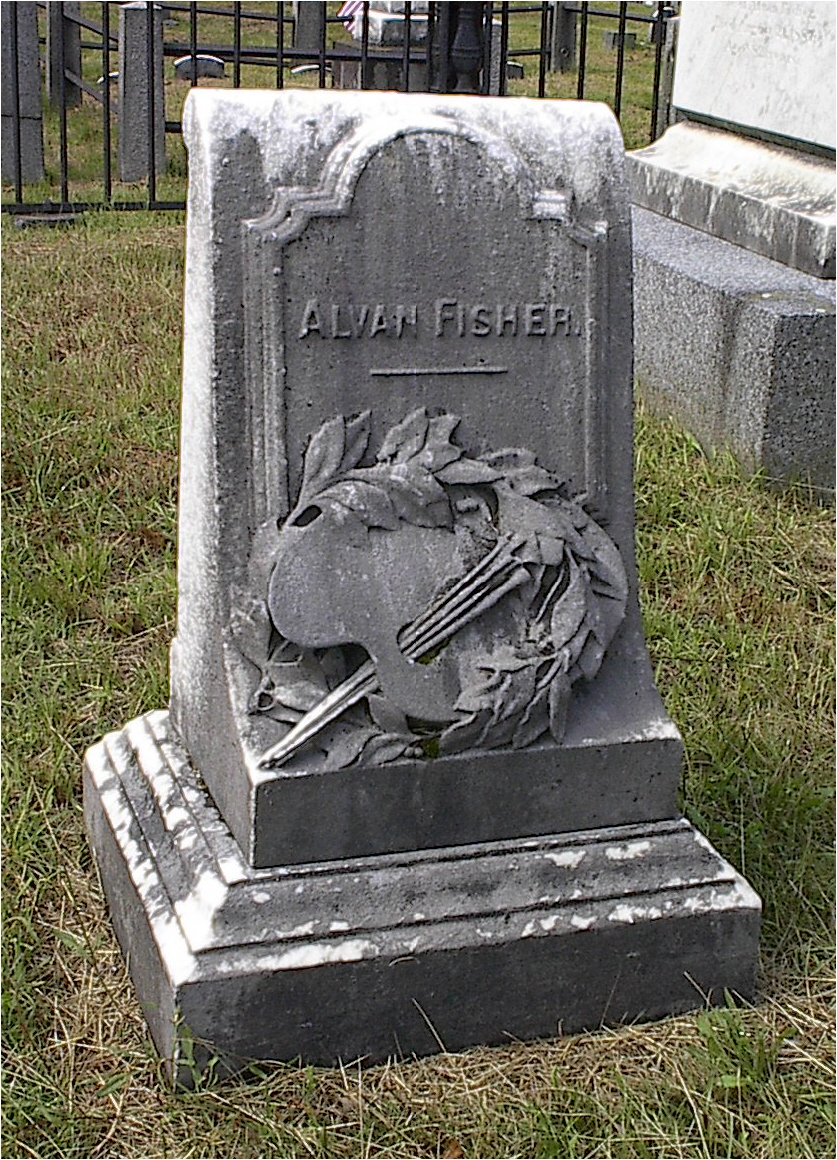
Fisher's headstone in Old Village Cemetery

He died at Dedham, Massachusetts on February 13, 1863, and is buried in Dedham's Old Village Cemetery. Perhaps the greatest recognition of his skill as a landscape artist came one hundred years later when First Lady Jacqueline Kennedy chose his painting, The Remnant of the Tribe, to hang in the Green Room of the White House. The Dedham Historical Society has a collection of his paintings, sketches and biographical material. His largest oil painting, Washington at Dorchester Heights, a nine-by-six foot copy of Gilbert Stuart's painting of the same title, hangs in the Dedham Town Hall, a testimonial to the town's most illustrious painter.

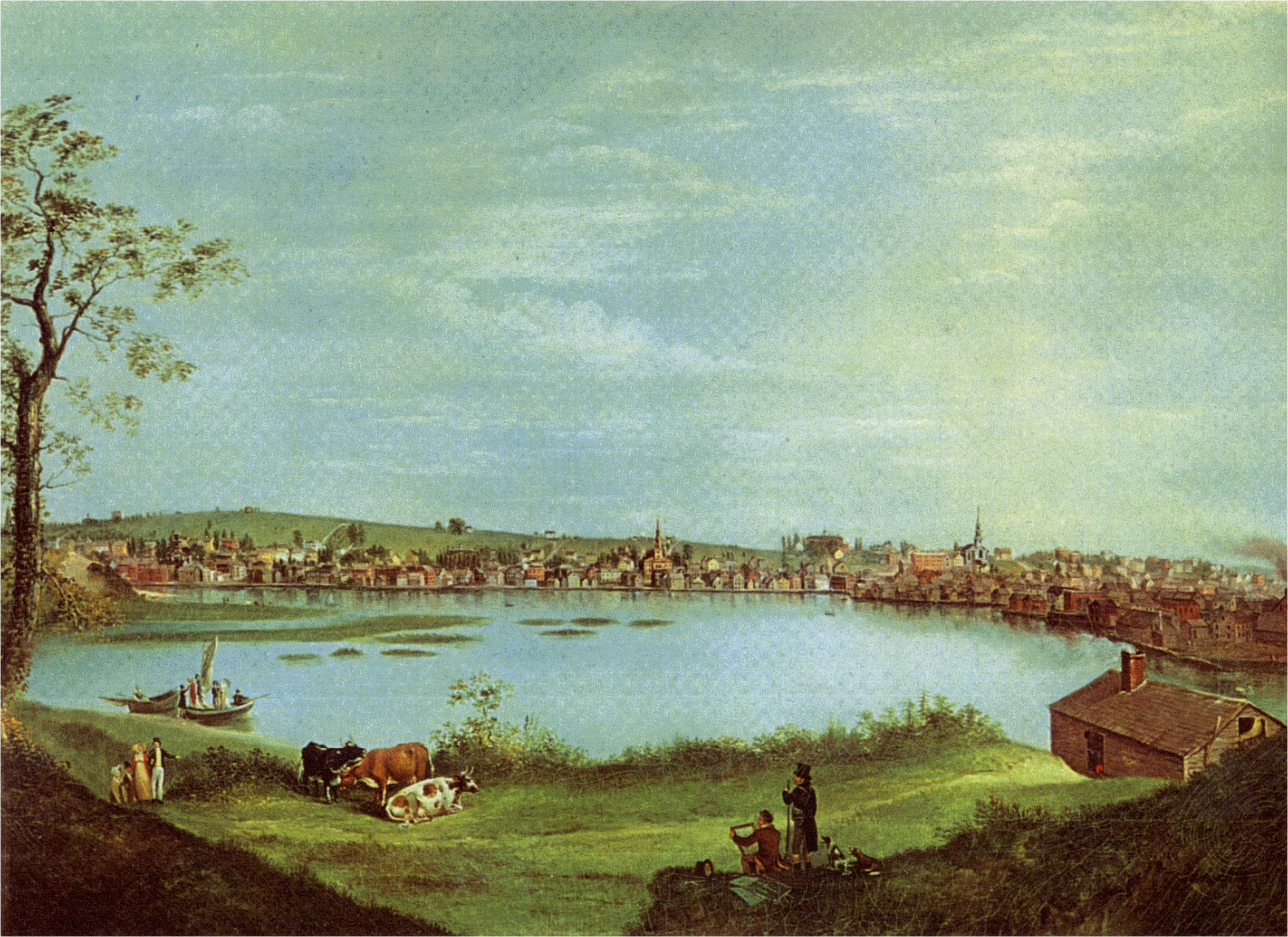
Providence from Across the Cove (1818), Rhode Island Historical Society.

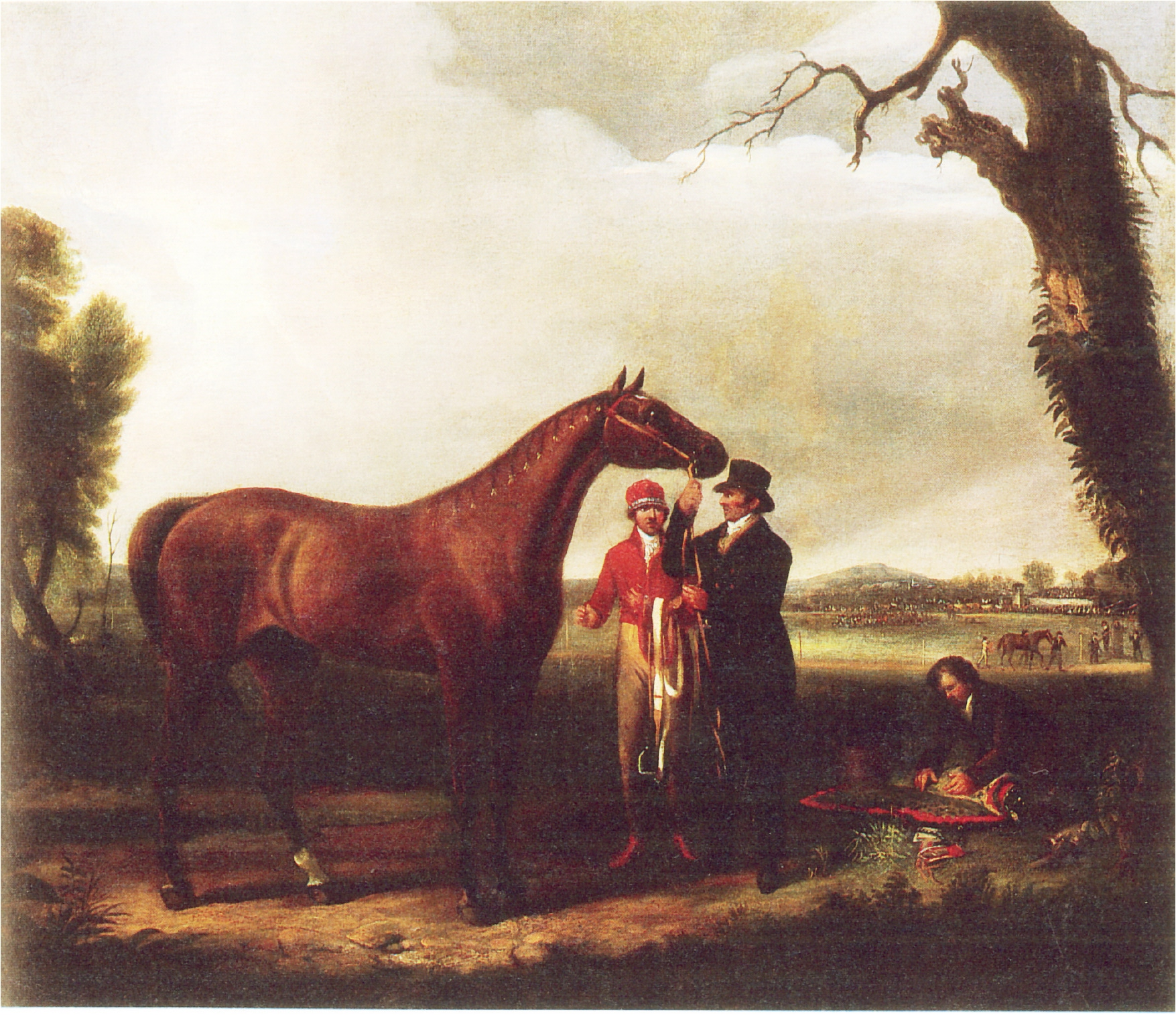
Eclipse with Race Track (1823), Munson-Williams-Proctor Arts Institute.

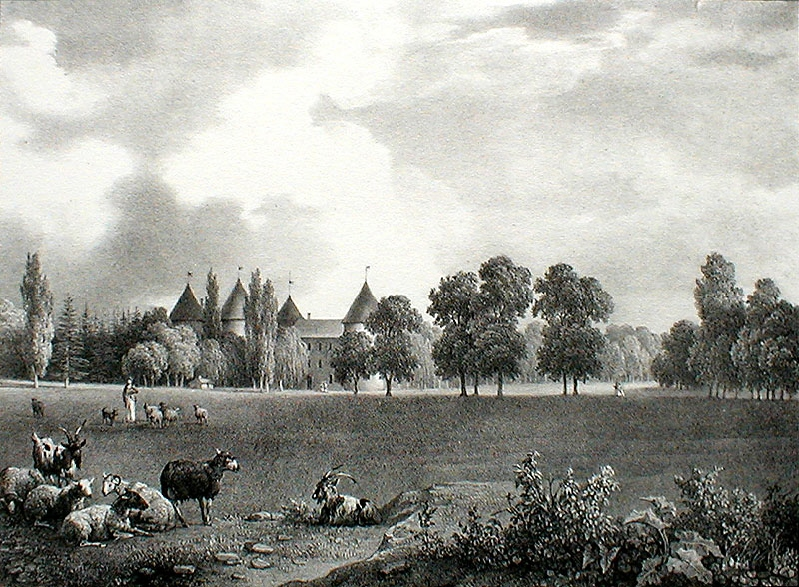
La Grange North-Western-View (1826).

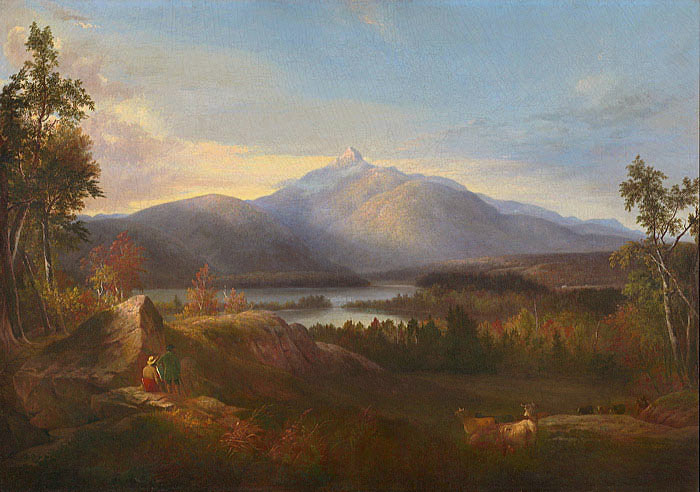
Chocorua Peak, Pond and Adjacent Scenery (1860).
