= Ednah Dow Littlehale Cheney =

American writer and philanthropist

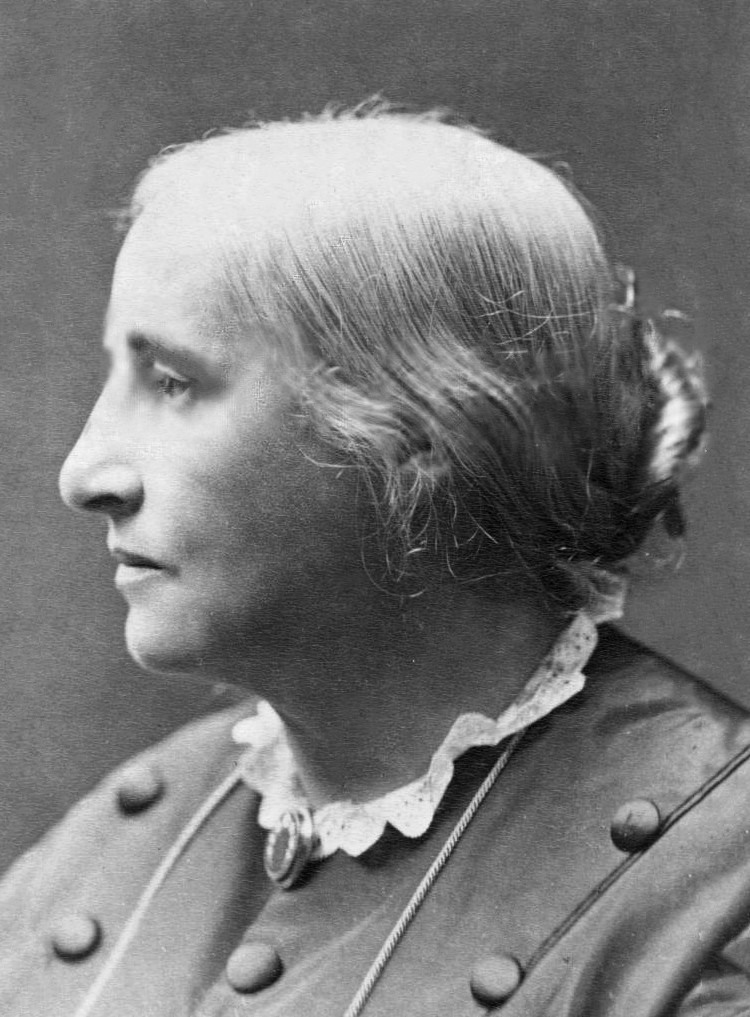
- Born: Ednah Dow Littlehale Cheney; June 27, 1824; Beacon Hill, Boston, Massachusetts, U.S.
- Died: November 19, 1904 (aged 80); Jamaica Plain, Boston
- Resting place: East Cemetery, Manchester, Connecticut, U.S.
- Education: Fowle's Monitorial School
- Occupations: writer, reformer, philanthropist
- Spouse: Seth Wells Cheney (m. 1853; died 1856)
- Children: Margaret Swan Cheney
- Writing career
- Language: English

Ednah Dow Littlehale Cheney (June 27, 1824 – November 19, 1904) was an American writer, reformer, and philanthropist.

She was born on Beacon Hill, Boston, June 27, 1824; and was educated in private schools in Boston. Cheney served as secretary of the School of Design for Women in Boston from 1851 till 1854. She married portrait artist Seth Wells Cheney on May 19, 1853. His ill-health limited his volume of work and after a winter trip abroad (1854-1855) he died in 1856. They had one child, Margaret.

Cheney's life was devoted to philosophic and literary research and work. She was one of the marked personalities of Boston in her day, prominent in reform movements. Naturally averse to personal publicity, she did not shun it where her name and word could add weight to the advocacy of a just cause. In the education and health of the community, she showed the most interest. She was a strenuous champion of the claims of African Americans to political and social justice. She advocated for religious toleration and the enfranchisement of women. She took an interest in social concerns such as the Freedman's Aid Society (secretary of the committee on aid for colored regiments and of the teachers' committee, 1863), Massachusetts Woman Suffrage Association (vice president), New England Women's Club (vice president) and the New England Hospital for Women and Children (secretary, 1862). She lectured at the Concord School of Philosophy on the history of art, and wrote about art in several books and articles. She was an active member of the Margaret Fuller conversation class. She went south to visit the Freedmen's schools in 1866, 1868, and 1869. Cheney was one of the founders in 1862 of the New England Hospital for Women and Children, its secretary for twenty-seven years and president fifteen years. Numbered among the veterans of the forward movements in education, philanthropy, and reform of the nineteenth century, she continued to grace by her presence and help by her wise counsels the deliberative assemblies and budding activities of the dawn of the twentieth century. She was the author of Reminiscences.

Cheney visited Europe several times, and spoke before lyceums west of New England in 1873, 1875, and 1876. The location where her home stood in Jamaica Plain is a site on the Boston Women's Heritage Trail.

== Early years and education ==
Ednah Dow Littlehale was born in Boston, June 27, 1824. She was the daughter of Sargent Smith and Ednah Parker (Dow) Littlehale, and was named for her mother. Cheney's birthplace was on Belknap Street, now Joy, about half-way up Beacon Hill from Cambridge Street. She was the third child born to her parents. Five children came after her, one a little brother; but only four —Ednah and three sisters, one a lifelong invalid— lived to adult age. When she was two years old, the family removed to Hayward Place, and six years later they took up their abode in a new house on Bowdoin Street.

Her parents gave Cheney every educational advantage. At the first school she attended, kept by the Misses Pemberton, daughter of Ebenezer Pemberton who founded the school, she had good training in reading, spelling, arithmetic, grammar, and geography. The second was Mr. William B. Fowle's Monitorial School, which she entered with her elder sister, Mary Frances. Here, she distinguished herself by her knowledge of grammar, as shown by her skill in "parsing," and her ready recitations in other studies that interested her, one of these being French, which was especially well taught. The attraction of a new and friendly acquaintance, Miss Caroline Healey, drew her to the school on Mount Vernon Street of Mr. Joseph H. Abbot. For a few terms, she continued to advance in various ways of learning, more or less pleasurable, in the meantime successfully cultivating independence of thought, till, feeling herself not in harmony with the constituted authorities, she was as anxious to leave the Abbot school as she had been to enter it. This was the end of her school-days.

== Ancestry ==
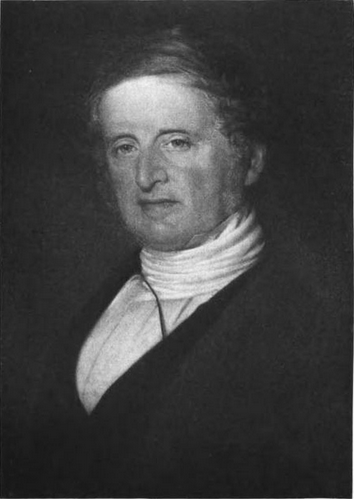
Sargent Smith Littlehale

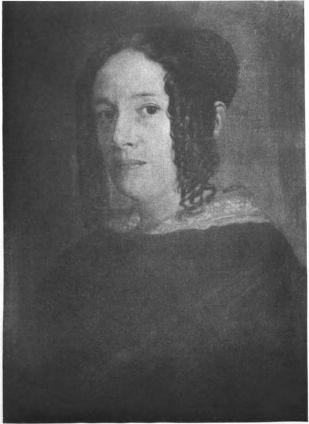
Ednah Parker (Dow) Littlehale

Her father was for thirty years a Boston merchant. His native place was Gloucester, Massachusetts. Born in 1787, he died in 1851. He was of the fifth generation of the Essex County, Massachusetts family founded by Richard Littlehale, who took the "oath of supremacy and allegiance to pass for New England in the Mary & John of London, Robert Sayres, Master, 24th March, 1633," joined the Massachusetts Bay Colony at Ipswich, Massachusetts, and, eventually settling in Haverhill, Massachusetts, was Town Clerk for twenty years, serving also as Clerk of the Writs. Richard Littlehale, of Gloucester (Joseph; Isaac, Richard), Mrs. Cheney's grandfather, was a Captain of militia. He married a widow, Mrs. Sarah Byles Edgar, daughter of Captain Charles Byles, who commanded a company at the siege of Louisburg, and who also fought at Quebec under Wolfe.

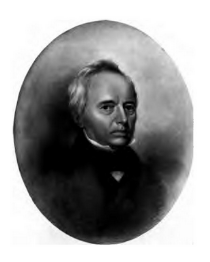
Jeremiah Dow

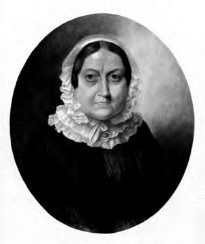
Ednah (Parker) Dow

Mrs. Cheney's mother, Mrs. Ednah P. Littlehale, a native of Exeter, New Hampshire, born in 1799, died in Boston in 1876. She was the daughter of Jeremiah and Ednah (Parker) Dow and on the paternal side a descendant in the seventh generation of Thomas Dow, one of the early settlers of Newbury, Massachusetts, freeman in 1642. The Dow ancestral line is Thomas, Stephen, Nathaniel, Captain Jeremiah, Jeremiah, Ednah Parker (Mrs. Littlehale).

Thomas' Dow removed from Newbury to Haverhill, where he died in 1654. Stephen, son of Thomas and his wife Phebe, was born in Newbury in 1642. Stephen, born in Haverhill in 1670, married Mary Hutchins. Their son Nathaniel, born in 1699, married Mary Hendricks, and lived in Haverhill and Methuen, Massachusetts, and Salem, New Hampshire, formerly a part of Haverhill.

Captain Jeremiah, born in Haverhill, in 1738, married Lydia Kimball, of Bradford, Massachusetts, daughter of Isaac Kimball, a lineal descendant of Richard Kimball, of Ipswich. Captain Jeremiah Dow died in Salem, in 1826. His name is in the Revolutionary Rolls of New Hampshire under different dates. He commanded a company in Lieutenant Colonel Welch's regiment, which marched from Salem, N.H., to join the Northern army in September, 1777. He was probably the Jeremiah Dow of New Hampshire who was private in Captain Marston's company in the expedition to Crown Point in 1762. Retire H. Parker marched to Cambridge, Massachusetts as a Minuteman of the Second Bradford Foot Company on the alarm of April 19, 1775.

Mrs. Littlehale's maternal grandparents were Lieutenant Retire H. and Ednah (Hardy) Parker, of East Bradford, now Groveland, Massachusetts. The Parker line of ancestry began with Abraham' Parker, who married at Woburn, Massachusetts in 1644 Rose Whitlock, and about the year 1653, removed to Chelmsford, Massachusetts. It continued through Abraham, who married Martha Livermore and settled in East Bradford; Abraham and wife, Elizabeth Bradstreet (a descendant of Humphrey Bradstreet, of Rowley, Massachusetts); Abraham and his second wife, Hannah Beckett, daughter of Retire Beckett, of Salem, belonging to a noted family of ship-builders; to Lieutenant Retire H. Parker and his wife, Ednah Hardy, above named.

Martha Livermore, wife of Abraham Parker, of East Bradford, was a daughter of John Livermore, of Watertown, Massachusetts (the founder of the family of this name in New England), and his wife Grace (born Sherman), whom he married in England, and who was closely related to the immigrant progenitors of the most prominent Sherman families of America. Mrs. Grace Sherman Livermore was a useful member of the colony, being an obstetrician. She survived her husband, and died in Chelmsford in 1690, aged seventy-five years (gravestone). Judging from printed records, the name Ednah has come down to Cheney not only from her mother, her grandmother Dow, and her great-grandmother Parker, but from a more remote ancestress, Mrs. Ednah Bailey, wife of Richard' Bailey, of Rowley, Massachusetts. Tracing backward, Mrs. Ednah Hardy Parker, born in 1745, was the daughter of Captain Eliphalet and Hannah (Platts) Hardy, granddaughter of Jonas Platts and his wife, Anne Bailey, and great-grand-daughter of Deacon Joseph Bailey, of East Bradford, who was son of Richard and his wife Ednah. Richard Bailey was one of the company that set up in Rowley the first cloth-mill in America. Mrs. Ednah Bailey's maiden name is thought to have been Halstead.

== Career ==
=== Pre-war ===
Her early womanhood was passed under stimulating influences, participating in Margaret Fuller's "conversations"— classes attended by and made for women — instituted in the decade of 1830-40. Ralph Waldo Emerson, Amos Bronson Alcott, Abby May, James Freeman Clarke, and Theodore Parker were among those who strongly influenced her thought. The dawn of New England Transcendentalism brought golden opportunities to the young aspirant for intellectual culture. A great awakening and a new sense of the surpassing riches of life was the result to Cheney of attending for three successive seasons the conversations of Margaret Fuller. Few teachers have shown to such a degree the power of personality. Cheney wrote:— "I absorbed her life and her thoughts, and to this day I am astonished to find how large a part of what I am when I am most myself I have derived from her. . . .She did not make us her disciples, her blind followers. She opened the book of life and helped us to read it for ourselves." It is significant that Cheney and her elder sister, Mary Frances, were among the first parishioners of Theodore Parker when he came from West Roxbury, Massachusetts to Boston, 1846. He would become her inspirer, friend, and comforter in time of sorrow.

For a year or two before her marriage, Cheney was the secretary of the School of Design for Women in Boston, of which she was one of the founders in 1851. Short-lived, the school yet served to show the existence of talent among American women, and is remembered as "one of the failures that enriched the ground for success."

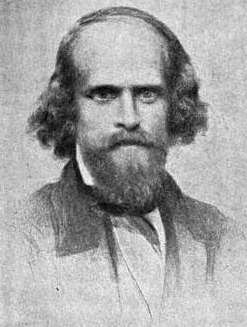
Seth Wells Cheney

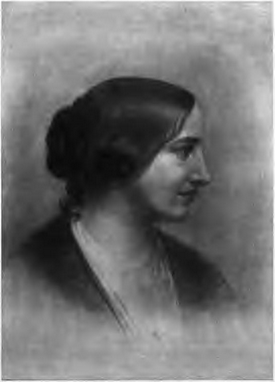
Ednah Dow Littlehale Cheney

On May 19, 1853, she married the artist, Seth Wells Cheney. Twin ambitions, art and literature, were native to Cheney. Choosing the latter for her field of occupation, she also cultivated her taste for the former. As an artist's wife, she made her first visit to Europe, sailing with her husband for Liverpool in August, 1854. The year following their return (in June, 1855) witnessed the birth of a daughter, Margaret Swan, in September, 1855, and the death of Mr. Cheney in April, 1856, in South Manchester, Connecticut, his native place. He was one of the earliest crayon artists in America. Seth Cheney's crayon portraits were among the delights of his time. The foremost women of Boston were glad to sit for him. Among his portraits of men, one of Theodore Parker which was highly prized. An exhibition of a number of these works was arranged some years after by Sylvester Rosa Koehler, curator of engravings, Museum of Fine Arts, Boston.

Cheney was one of the subscribers toward the establishment in 1856, under the leadership of Dr. Marie Elizabeth Zakrzewska, of the first women's hospital, the New England Hospital for Women and Children. A few years later, she was interested with others in the addition of a clinical department to the medical school for women in Boston, which merged in Boston University. In 1863, she was one of the three women corporators of the New England Hospital for Women and Children, which they had started in 1862 in a house on Pleasant Street. "Accepting the position of secretary, Cheney, to quote the words of Dr. Zakrzewska, "devoted herself to the work, and became one of the most powerful advocates and supporters of this institution — an institution now firmly established and professionally recognized, and which by its efficiency and conscientious work has not only educated women as physicians and nurses, but has opened the way for the former to a professional equality with medical men, as the Massachusetts Medical Society was the first to admit women as members." Succeeding Lucy Goddard as president of the hospital in 1887, Cheney continued in office for fifteen years, or until her resignation on account of failing health in October, 1902, at which time she became Honorary President.

=== Civil War ===
From 1863, Cheney made her home in Jamaica Plain. Early interested in the work of the Freedmen's Aid Society (founded in 1861), she became the secretary of the teachers' committee on the resignation of Hannah E. Stevenson. In 1865, she went to Readville and taught soldiers, and attended the convention of Freedmen's societies in New York City. Cheney made several visits to the South in the years directly following the close of the Civil War for the Union, the first time going with Abby May as a delegate to a convention in Baltimore. Unexpectedly called upon there to address a meeting composed largely of African Americans, she had her first experience in public speaking. During her absence on one of these Southern trips, a society was formed in Boston in 1867, of which she was appointed a director, and later Honorary President, and in which she continued to work — the Free Religious Association, "the freedom and inspiration of whose first meetings" she finds it "impossible to report."

=== Post-war ===
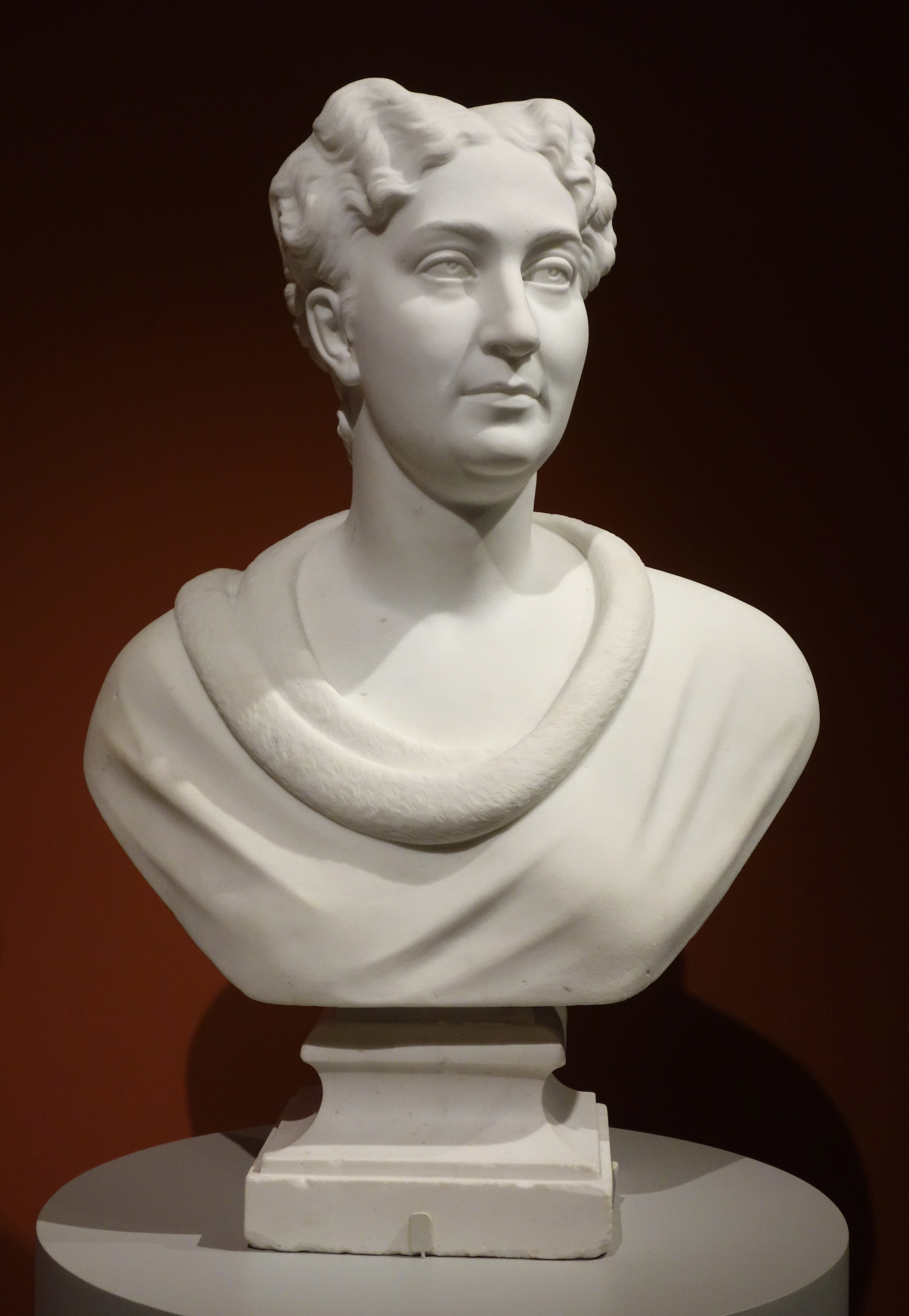
Bust of Cheney by Edmonia Lewis, 1868 (Bowdoin College Museum of Art)

In 1868, Cheney was one of the founders of the New England Women's Club, which soon came to be recognized as a forceful influence for good in the community. About the same time, she identified herself with the woman suffrage movement.

Joining the Association for the Advancement of Women early in the 1870s, a year or two after its organization, she became one of its most valued workers and speakers. In 1869, she assisted in founding a horticultural school for women, of which Abby W. May became president. Cheney lectured on horticulture for women before the Massachusetts State Agricultural Society in 1871.

Cheney's second visit to Europe in 1877, in company with her sisters and her daughter, was saddened in Rome by the death of her sister, Helen. Returning to Boston in 1878, she responded to an invitation to give a course of lectures on art at the Concord School of Philosophy the following summer, and continued to lecture throughout the session.

In 1879, she delivered a course of ten lectures on the history of art before the Concord School of Philosophy, and the same year was elected vice-president of the Massachusetts School Suffrage Association, later becoming its president.

Her works, all published in Boston, include: Hand-Book for American Citizens (1864); Patience (1870), Social Games (1871), Faithful to the Light (1872), Child of the Tide (1874), Life of Susan Dimoch (1875), Gleanings in Fields of Art (1881), Selected Poems of Michael Angelo (1885), Children's Friend, a sketch of Louisa M. Alcott (1888), Biography of L. M. Alcott (1889), Nora's Return (1890), Stories of Olden Time (1890), and a number of articles in hooks. She has contributed to the North American Review, the Christian Examiner, the Radical, Index, the Woman's Journal, and other periodicals. She edited the poems of David A. Wasson (Boston, 1887), and of Harriet Winslow Sewall (Boston, 1889). Much of her work was devoted to religious and artistic subjects. She also published three memoirs of family members: Memoir of S. W. Cheney (1881), Memoir of John Cheney, Engraver (1888), and Memoir of Margaret S. Cheney (1888).

== Later years ==
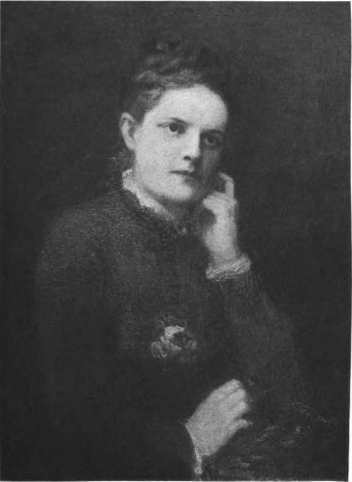
Margaret Swan Cheney

In 1882, Cheney's daughter, Margaret Swan Cheney (September 8, 1855 – September 22, 1882), died of tuberculosis while a student in the 1882 class at Massachusetts Institute of Technology. A room in the Technology building was fitted up and named for her, the Margaret Swan Cheney Reading Room.

In 1887, she was elected president of the hospital she had helped to found. She was a delegate to the Woman's Council in Washington, D. C. in 1888. In 1890, she attended the Lake Mohawk Negro Conference.

Cheney died at Jamaica Plain, November 19, 1904, and was buried at East Cemetery, Manchester, Connecticut.

== Works ==
- Patience: a series of thirty games with cards. 1870
- Social games. A collection of 31 games with cards. 1871
- Faithful to the Light and Other Tales. 1871
- Sally Williams, the mountain girl. 1872
- The Child of the Tide / By Ednah D. Cheney. 1874
- Memoir of Susan Dimock : resident physician of the New England Hospital for Women and Children. 1875
- Jenny of the Lighthouse. 1877
- Memoir of Seth W. Cheney, artist. 1881
- Gleanings in the Fields of Art. 1881
- Selected Poems from Michelangelo Buonarroti, with translations from various sources. 1885
- Louisa May Alcott, the Children's Friend. 1888
- The Life of Louisa May Alcott. 1888
- Memoir of John Cheney, Engraver. 1889
- Memoir of Margaret Swan Cheney. 1889
- Nora’s return : a sequel to "The doll’s house" of Henry Ibsen / by Ednah D. Cheney. 1890
- Memoirs of Lucretia Crocker and Abby W. May. 1893
- Life of Christian Daniel Rauch of Berlin, Germany. Drawn from German authorities by Ednah D. Cheney. 1893
- Reminiscences of Ednah Dow Cheney (born Littlehale). 1902
