= William Wales =

William Wales may refer to:

- William, Prince of Wales (born 1982), elder son of Charles III and Diana, Princess of Wales
- William Wales (astronomer) (1734?–1798), British astronomer and mathematician
- William W. Wales (1818–1902), Minnesota politician
- William Wales (optician) (1838?–1907), English American inventor

== See also ==
- William Walls (disambiguation)
