= A River Glimpse =

Painting by Thomas Doughty

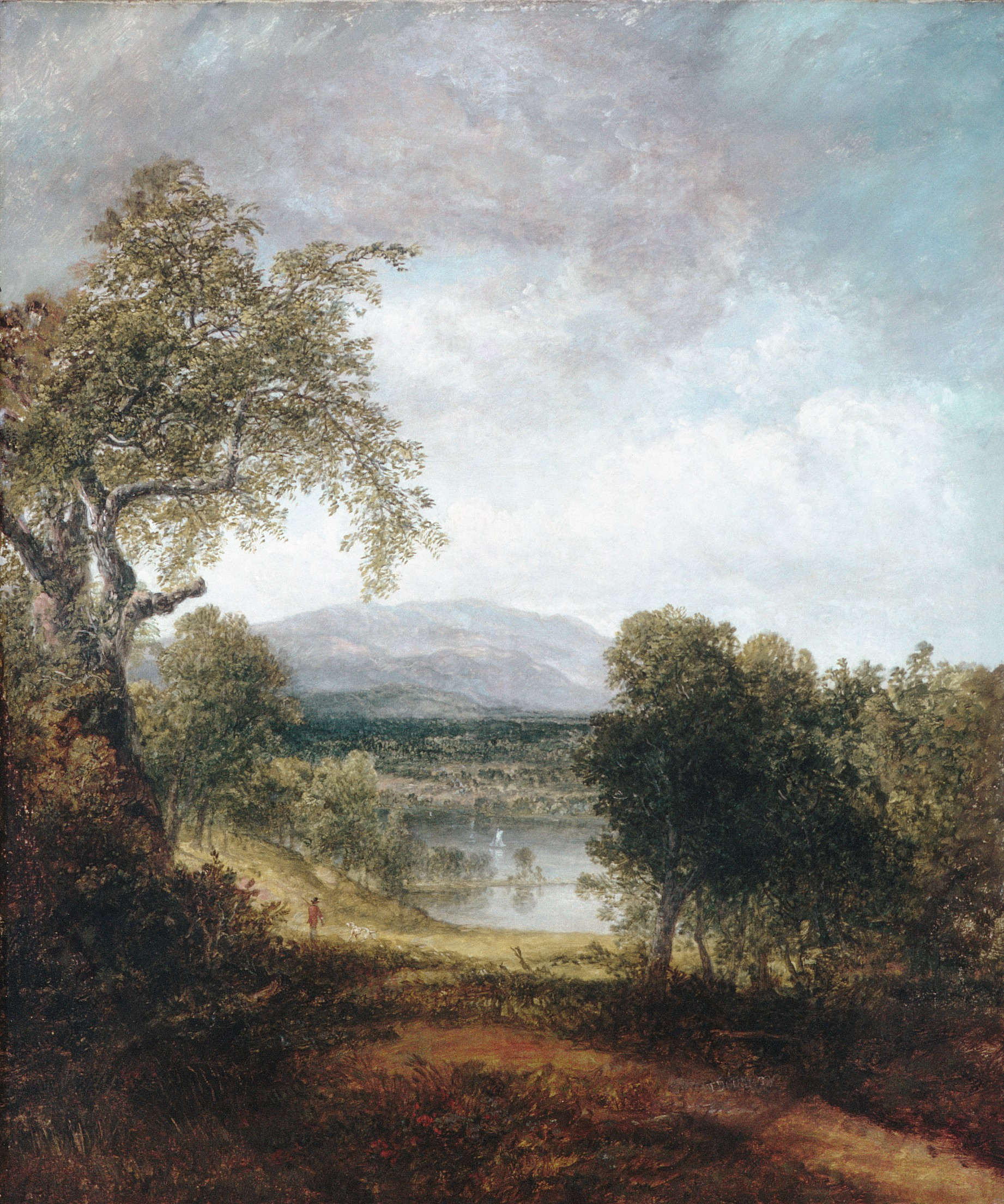
- Artist: Thomas Doughty
- Year: c. 1842-1850
- Medium: Oil on canvas
- Dimensions: 76.8 cm × 63.5 cm (30.2 in × 25.0 in)
- Location: Metropolitan Museum of Art, New York

A River Glimpse is a mid 19th century painting by American artist Thomas Doughty. Done in oil on canvas, the painting depicts a "glimpse" of a river between trees; this is in keeping with Doughty's status as a connective artist between English pastoral painters and the American Hudson River School. The work is in the collection of the Metropolitan Museum of Art.
