= Seth Wells Cheney =

American artist

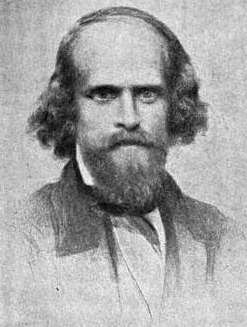
Portrait of Seth W. Cheney

Seth Wells Cheney (November 28, 1810 – September 10, 1856) was an American artist and a pioneer of crayon work in the United States.

== Biography ==
He was the son of George Cheney and Electa Woodbridge. He received a public school education. In 1833 he went to Paris and studied under Jean-Baptiste Isabey and Paul Delaroche when he returned he started drawing portraits in Boston in 1841.

His portraits are in black and white crayon. He was one of the earliest American artists in black and white, and excelled in giving spirituality to his portraits and ideal female faces, which were sought by collectors. Among his works are portraits of Theodore Parker with his wife, James Walker (president of Harvard), William Cullen Bryant, and Ephraim Peabody, “Rosalie,” and “A Roman Girl.” On May 10, 1848, he was made an associate of the National Academy of Design.

When the poet Fitz-Greene Halleck expressed surprise that his portrait was not finished, Cheney said, “I will finish it,” whereupon he put his foot through it.

He died in South Manchester, Connecticut.

== Family ==
He was the brother of Ward Cheney, a prominent silk manufacturer of South Manchester, and John Cheney, an engraver. He was married twice first in September 1847 to Emily Woodbridge Pitkin, daughter of Horace Pitkin and Emily Woodbridge. His wife, Emily, died without issue in 1850. Three years later on 19 May 1853 he married Ednah Dow Littlehale, daughter of Sargent Smith Littledale and Ednah Parker (Dow). This marriage produced one child: Margaret Swan Cheney (8 September 1855 – 22 September 1882) His memoirs were published by Ednah, his second wife, in 1881.

== Image gallery ==
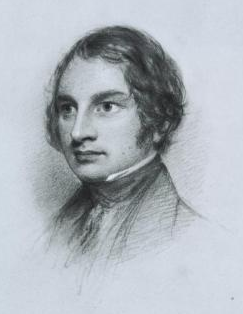
Portrait of Henry Wadsworth Longfellow, 1844

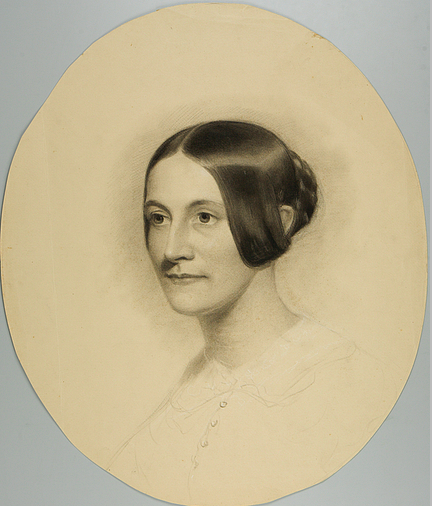
Female portrait head

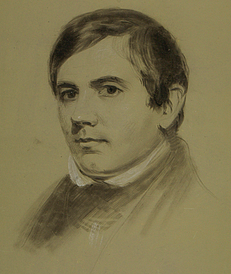
Male portrait head

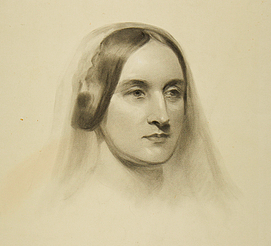
Female portrait head
