= Edward Gallaudet (engraver) =

American engraver (1809–1847)

Edward Gallaudet (April 30, 1808 – October 11, 1847) was an American engraver.

== History ==
Edward Gallaudet was the twelfth son of Peter Wallace Gallaudet, the personal secretary to US President George Washington while his office was in Philadelphia. Peter Wallace Gallaudet was the nephew of Elisha Gallaudet, the engraver of the first US coin, the 1776 Continental Dollar. Gallaudet was an apprentice engraver in Hartford, Connecticut. He then moved to Boston where he worked with John Cheney. He was a reputable line engraver and his best work was between 1835 and 1840. He also worked in New York City. He died at 38 years old.

== Notable works ==
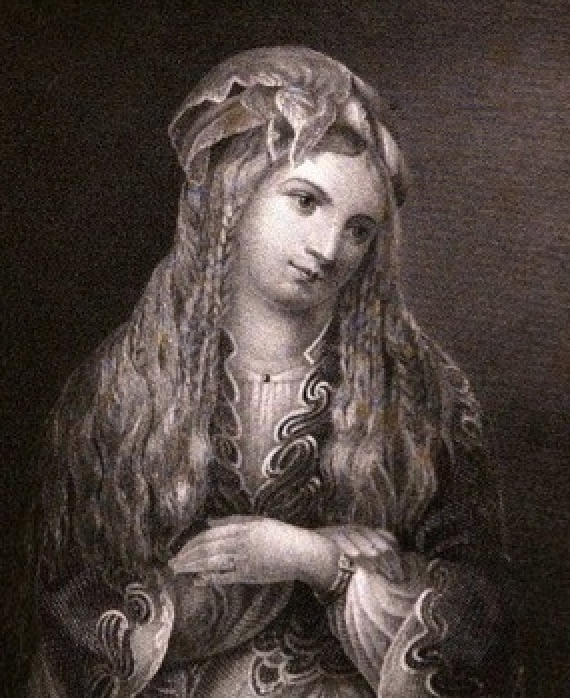
Engraving of Garafilia Mohalbi (1831)

Around 1830, Edward Gallaudet engraved Ann Halls miniature portrait of Garafilia Mohalbi. The engraving became extremely popular throughout the United States and became Ann Halls most popular work. Notable poet Hannah Flagg Gould wrote a poem about Gallaudet's engraving.

The Progress of Intemperance is another engraving designed, engraved, and published by Edward Gallaudet. The work was published in 1831 in Boston, Massachusetts. The engraving was a series of six smaller engravings that give a portrait of a man as he descends from sobriety to drunkenness. This piece is derived from William Hogarth's A Rake's Progress, it features his hero progressing from debt into madness.

Alvan Fisher was an American pioneer of landscape painting. He turned most of his paintings into engravings. Gallaudet was commissioned to make many of the engravings. The Rescue Party by Alvan Fisher is one of the paintings that was also engraved. In 1836, Gallaudet engraved The Whirlwind a painting by Thomas Cole.

== Bibliography ==
- Gimber, Stephen Henry (1831). The Youth's Keepsake A Christmas and New Year's Present. A. Leavitt, publisher 1831.
