= John Cheney (engraver) =

American engraver (1801–1885)

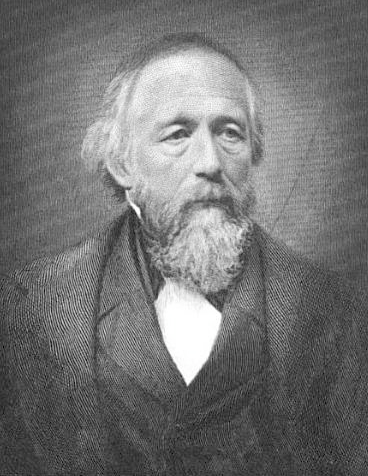
Portrait of John Cheney

John Cheney (1801-1885) was an American engraver in Boston and Philadelphia in the 19th century. Considered by bibliographer Frederick Winthrop Faxon to be the country's leading portrait engraver, Cheney was for a time employed exclusively by The Token annual gift book. His work was featured in the 1828 volume, as well as every volume from 1830 through 1838. He also travelled in Europe in the 1830s. His brothers were Ward Cheney and Seth Wells Cheney, who married the writer, Ednah Dow Littlehale Cheney. Examples of Cheney's work are in the Museum of Fine Arts, Boston. In 1833, he was elected into the National Academy of Design as an Honorary Academician.
