= John Dix Fisher =

American physician

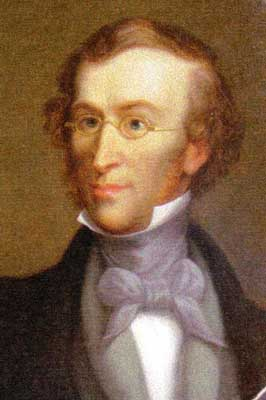
Portrait of John Dix Fisher by his brother, artist Alvan Fisher (ca.1840)

John Dix Fisher (March 27, 1797 – March 3, 1850) was a medical doctor and founder of Perkins Institution for the Blind in Boston, Massachusetts. He is credited with introducing the stethoscope into the United States and was an early advocate for the practice of mediate auscultation. He discovered what was called "cephalic bellows-sound" or "cerebral murmur", a phenomenon related to cerebral circulation which was thought to be a physical symptom of diseases of the brain. He was a founding member of the American Statistical Association.

== Early life ==
John Dix Fisher was born in Needham, Massachusetts, the youngest of the six sons of Aaron and Lucy (Stedman) Fisher. The Fisher family was descended from Anthony Fisher, one of the signers of the Dedham Covenant in 1636. All six sons were self-made men who became successful merchants, traders and professional men in Dedham and Boston, Massachusetts.

With the support of his older brothers, Fisher entered Brown University, graduating in 1820. After receiving his M.D. degree in 1825 from what was then called Massachusetts Medical College of Harvard University, he immediately accompanied his brother, the artist Alvan Fisher, on a trip to Europe. In Paris, he pursued his professional studies with such eminent physicians of the period as René Laennec, inventor of the stethoscope; Gabriel Andral, distinguished pathologist; and Alfred Velpeau, renowned for his knowledge of surgical anatomy.

== Career ==
In medical school, Fisher had studied with James Jackson, Harvard's first professor of clinical medicine and one of the "fathers" of Massachusetts General Hospital. Jackson had touched on the difficulties of distinguishing smallpox from other eruptive diseases and the need for a series of colored pictures that would illustrate the progress of the disease. Fisher undertook such a project while in Paris and wrote Description of the Distinct, Confluent, and Inoculated Small Pox, Varioloid Disease, Cow Pox, and Chicken Pox (1829) which included thirteen colored plates. The paintings from which the plates were made were executed under Fisher's direction by a French artist working at the bedside of the patients during 1825 and 1826 when smallpox was an epidemic in Paris.

Fisher also observed the methods of instructing the blind that were being practiced in Paris. He visited the world's first school for blind children, L'Institution Nationale des Jeunes Aveugles, founded by Valentin Haüy in 1784. He was impressed with how students were taught to read from raised-type books, to write, and to learn mathematics, geography, languages, music, and manual arts. Inspired, he returned to Boston and spent the next three years persuading family and friends who had both the means and the conscience to help fund an American version of the Paris school. The Massachusetts legislature eventually signed an act incorporating the New England Asylum for the Blind on March 2, 1829, and soon after provided $6,000 of funding. The trustees searched for two years for a superintendent for the new school until, in 1831, Fisher recruited his friend, Samuel Gridley Howe. The two men had studied together at Brown University and Harvard Medical School. Howe opened the school in the summer of 1832 using an approach that gave students both the ability to think and the skills to support themselves to turn out independent, productive, well-educated members of society. Fisher continued as the school's doctor and vice president. The school's name was eventually changed to Perkins School for the Blind and is now located in Watertown, Massachusetts.

Fisher was a pioneer for medical reform in Boston. He is credited with introducing the stethoscope into the United States and was an early advocate for the practice of mediate auscultation—listening to the body through a stethoscope—using the techniques that he had learned during his studies in Paris with Laënnec. In July 1832, while using auscultation to examine a child affected with chronic hy cephalus, he discovered what was called "cephalic bellows-sound" or "cerebral murmur", a phenomenon related to cerebral circulation which was thought to be a physical symptom of diseases of the brain. His findings were circulated in medical journals throughout the world. However, the phenomenon was dismissed in 1880 as being without pathological significance.

He was among those present in the Ether Dome at Massachusetts General Hospital when ether was first used in public for a surgical operation, described by many as the most significant event in American medical history. He was one of the first to use ether during childbirth. Although Antoine Jean Desormeaux, a French surgeon, first introduced the endoscope to a patient and is considered the Father of Endoscopy, Fisher had several years earlier described an endoscope initially to inspect the vagina, but later modified it to examine the bladder and urethra.

As one of a group of young American doctors influenced by the teachings of another French physician, Pierre Louis, Fisher was an advocate of the "numerical method" in the United States, where the emphasis on the collection of observable, detailed data and their statistical analysis became a guideline for medical research and the foundation for epidemiology. He was present along with William Cogswell, Richard Fletcher, Oliver Peabody, and Lemuel Shattuck at a meeting held on November 17, 1839, in which the American Statistical Association (ASA) was formed. These men were graduates of Brown, Dartmouth, and Harvard and were trained in law, medicine, theology, literature, and education. The constitution of the Society set out as its aims: "...to collect, preserve, and diffuse statistical information in the different departments of human knowledge." It was particularly instrumental in improving public health and encouraging advances in preventive medicine.

He was also a member of the Massachusetts Medical Society which, in concert with the ASA in 1842, led the effort to establish the first statewide system to collect and publish vital statistics in the United States. In 1846, Fisher was elected attending physician at Massachusetts General Hospital, a position he held until his death on March 3, 1850, at his home in Hayward Place, Boston. On March 17, 1850, the hospital's Board of Trustees expressed its deep regret for "...the loss of an officer who, to high scientific attainments, united amiable and unassuming manners and the greatest kindness of heart; one who has uniformly discharged in a most zealous, faithful, and acceptable manner his duties toward this institution."

== Honors ==
A white marble monument in his memory stands in Mount Auburn Cemetery, Cambridge, Massachusetts.

== Trivia ==
According to an extract from Flashes of Light from the Spirit-Land compiled by Allen Putnam and published in 1872 by William White & Co., Boston, Mrs. J. H Conant was an American medium who, through the generosity of Luther Colby, editor of The Banner of Light, (a weekly subtitled "An Exponent of the Spiritual Philosophy of the Nineteenth Century," which had the largest circulation of any spiritualist paper in the world) gave, for the last 17 years of her life, free public séances in Boston. Her trance messages, characterized by the impersonation of the departed, were published weekly in The Banner. Mrs. Conant was known in spiritualist circles as both an inspirational speaker and a platform healer. For her medical diagnosis, the medium relied on the spirit of John Dix Fisher, a famous old Boston physician.
