= William Walls (disambiguation) =

William Walls (1819–1893) was a Scottish lawyer, industrialist and Dean of Guild of Glasgow.

William Walls may also refer to:

- William H. Walls (1932–2019), United States federal judge
- William Andrew Walls (1859–1936), Scottish rugby union player
- Bill Walls (1914–1993), American football player

== See also ==
- William Wall (disambiguation)
- William Wales (disambiguation)
