= William Archibald Wall =

American painter

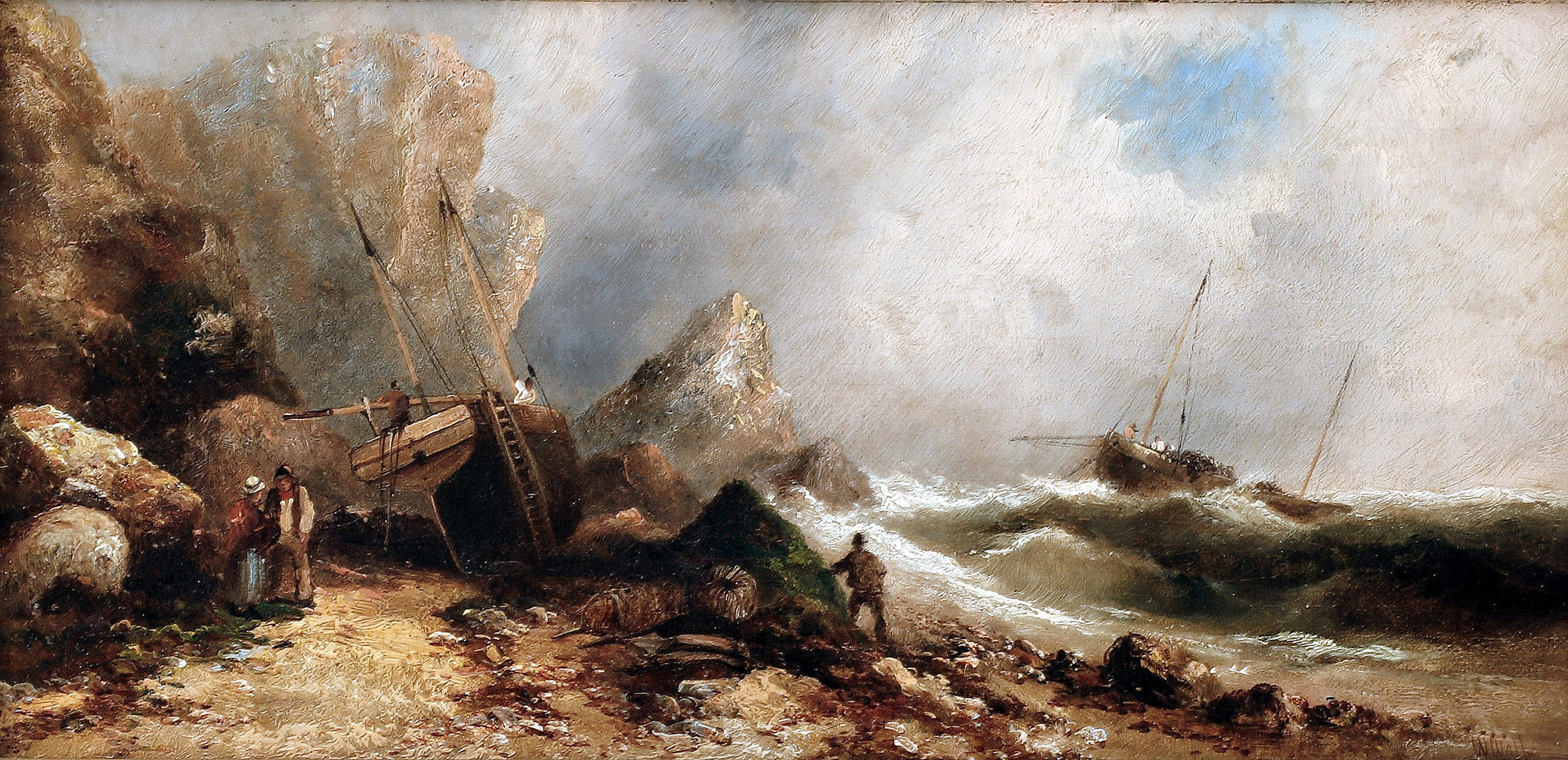
William Archibald Wall, Beached fishing boat and boats in very rough sea, c. 1865

William Archibald Wall (1828 – 1888) was an American painter. He was born in New York and died in Paddington, London. He specialized in waterscapes, landscapes and rural and urban views. Although American by birth, Wall spent many years living and working in London.

Wall was the son of Irish-born painter William Guy Wall (1792 – 1864). Wall the elder married in 1812, the same year he left Ireland for the United States. He and his wife had two daughters; William Archibald was their only son.

Wall contributed landscapes to the Royal Hibernian Academy in 1847 and 1853. He was in London in 1857 and 1858, and exhibited landscapes in those years in the Royal Academy, and in 1857 and 1859 in the British Institution. In 1861, he exhibited at the National Academy in New York. In 1865, 1870 and 1872 he again contributed to the Royal Academy, and was then living in, or near, London. His name last occurs in 1875, when he was residing at Norbiton.

In April 1871 he was living in Woking, Surrey. In April 1881 he was living on the Isle of Wight with his sister, Maria, and daughter, Emily. Emily witnessed his death on 3 February 1888 at 5, Surrendale Place, Paddington.

According to Denys Brook-Hart's book, British 19th Century Marine Painting, Wall is "a rather rare and certainly under-estimated artist".
