= Thomas Doughty (artist) =

American painter (1793–1856)

Thomas Tabor Doughty
- Born: July 19, 1793; Philadelphia, Pennsylvania
- Died: July 22, 1856 (aged 63)
- Resting place: Greenwood Cemetery, Brooklyn, New York
- Known for: Landscape paintings and lithography
- Movement: Associated with the Hudson River School

Thomas Doughty (July 19, 1793 – July 22, 1856) was an American artist associated with the Hudson River School.

== Biography ==
Born in Philadelphia, Thomas Doughty was the first American artist to work exclusively as a landscapist and was successful both for his skill and the fact that Americans were turning their interest to landscape. He worked mostly in Philadelphia, but also lived and worked in Boston and New York. He was known for his quiet, often atmospheric landscapes of the rivers and mountains of Pennsylvania, New York, New England, and especially the Hudson River Valley. He taught himself how to paint while apprenticing for a leather manufacturer. In 1827 he was elected an Honorary Academician by the National Academy of Design, which exhibited twenty-two of his paintings between 1826 and 1850. In the same period, twelve of his paintings were engraved and published in The Atlantic Souvenir and The Token annual gift books. Among them was Banks of the Juniata, of which critic John Neal in The Yankee wrote: "Nothing superior to it, hardly anything equal to it, can be found in the Annuals of the mother country."

By the 1830s, his reputation had begun to decline. William Dunlap in 1834 said Doughty "has long stood in the first rank as a landscape painter—he was at one time the first and best in the country." Already by 1828, Neal argued that Doughty was focusing too much on the interests of his patrons, having lost sight of the creative impulse: "He has lost a portion of his old strength and solidity; he is now getting into a way of peppering and salting, to the taste of his customers."

== Gallery ==
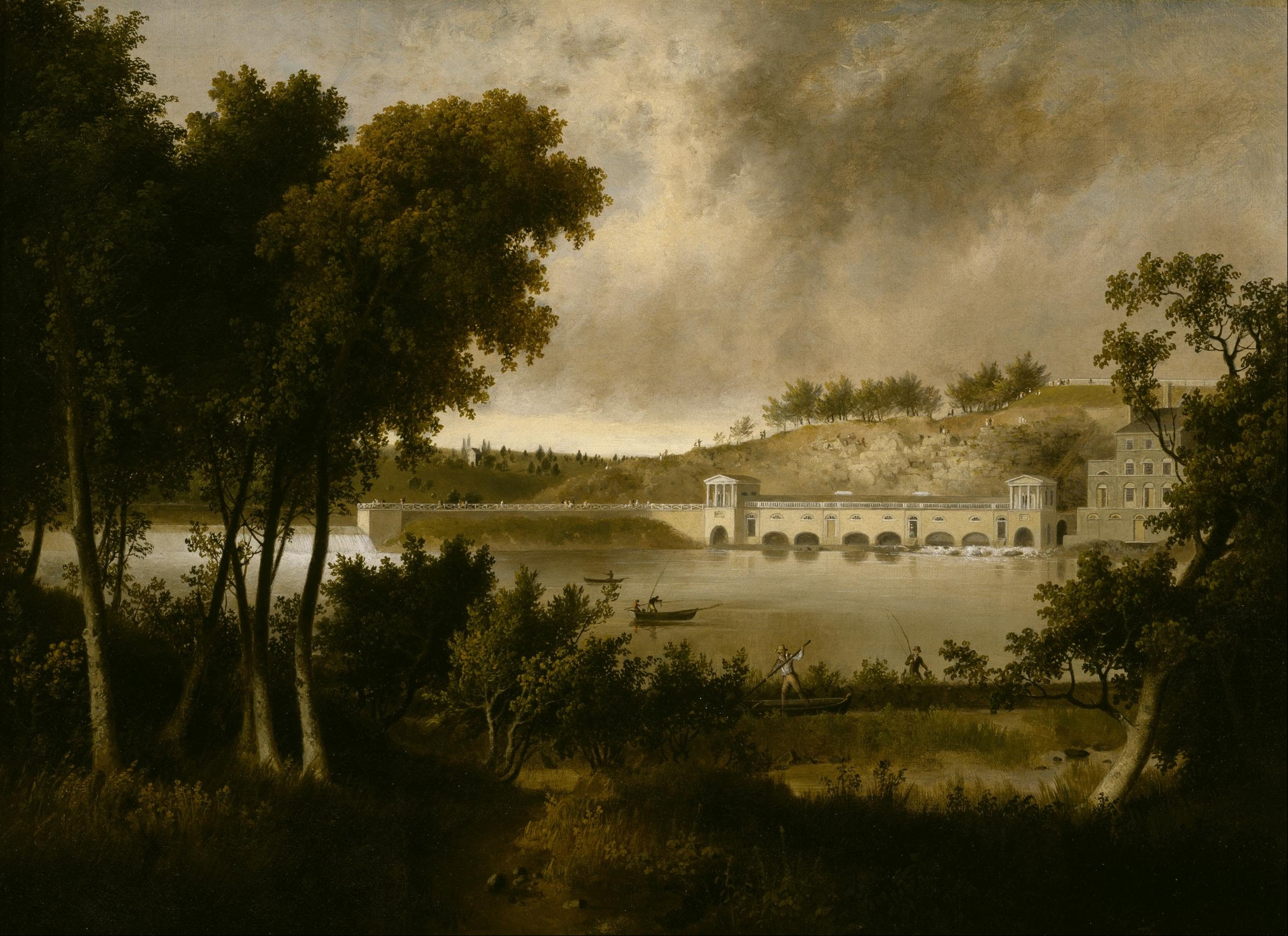
View of the Fairmount Waterworks, Philadelphia, from the Opposite Side of the Schuylkill River, 1824/26, Museum of Fine Arts, Houston

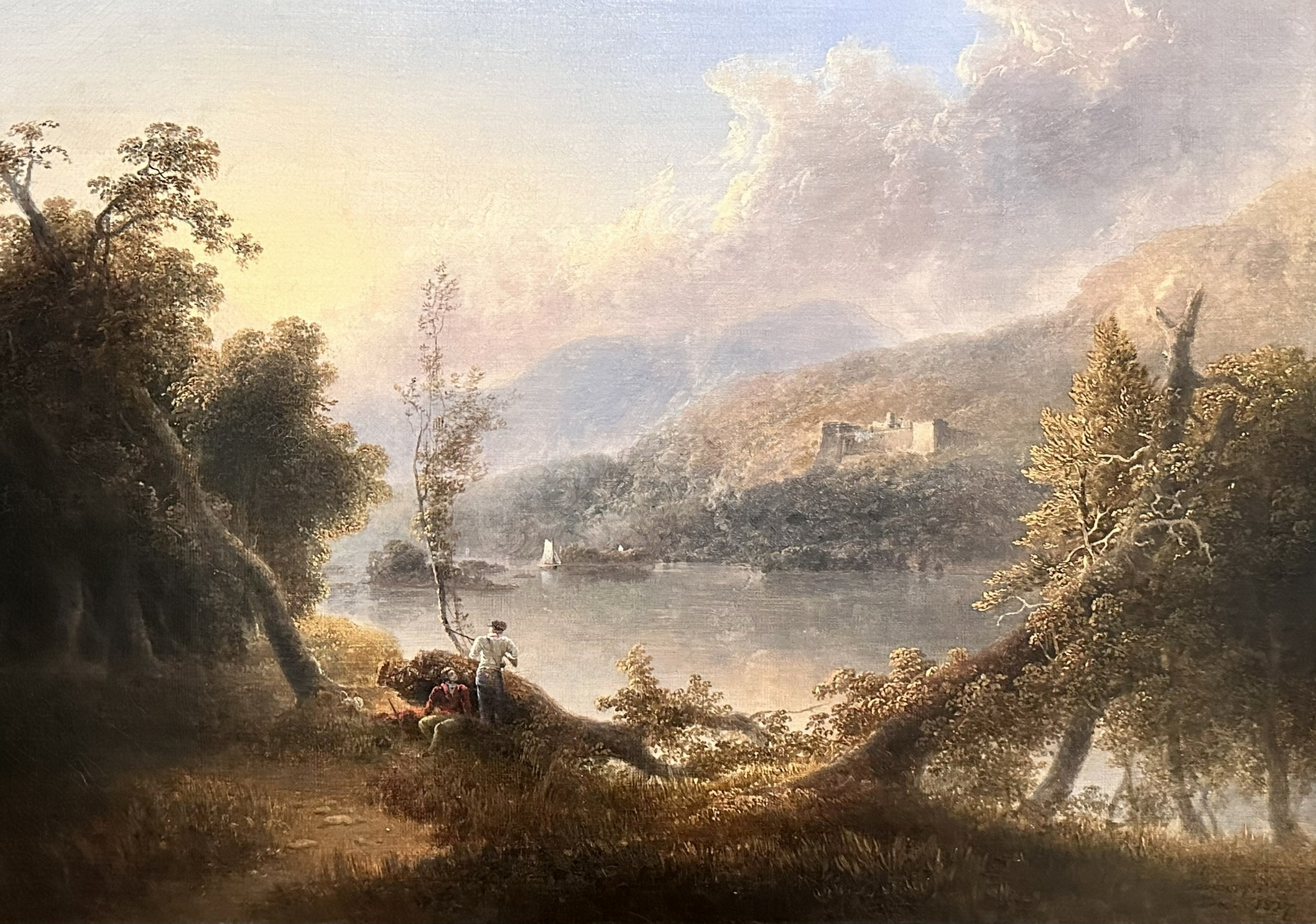
View of West Point, 1827, Museum of the Shenandoah Valley

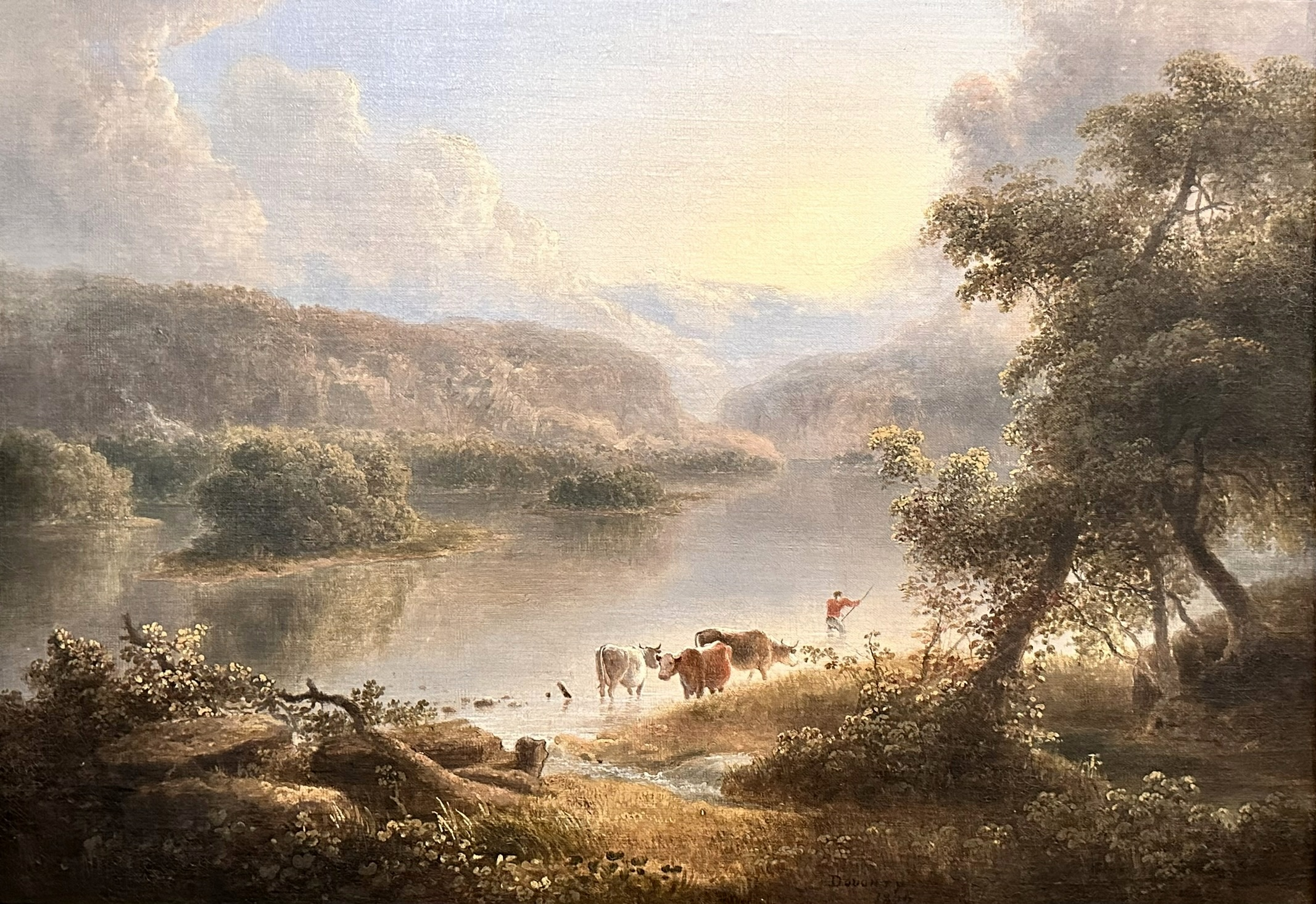
View of the Delaware Water Gap, 1827, Museum of the Shenandoah Valley

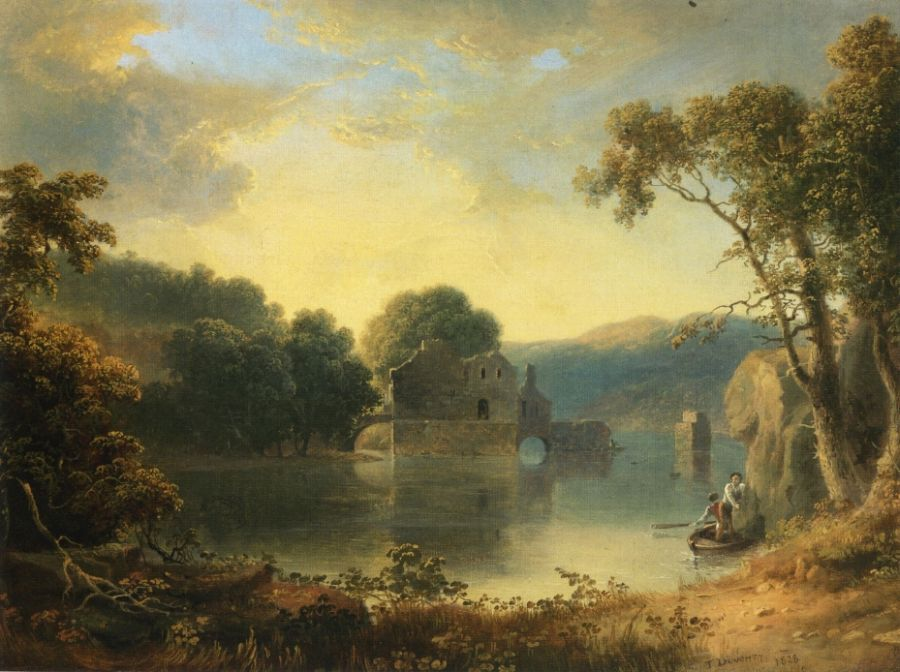
Ruins in a Landscape, 1828

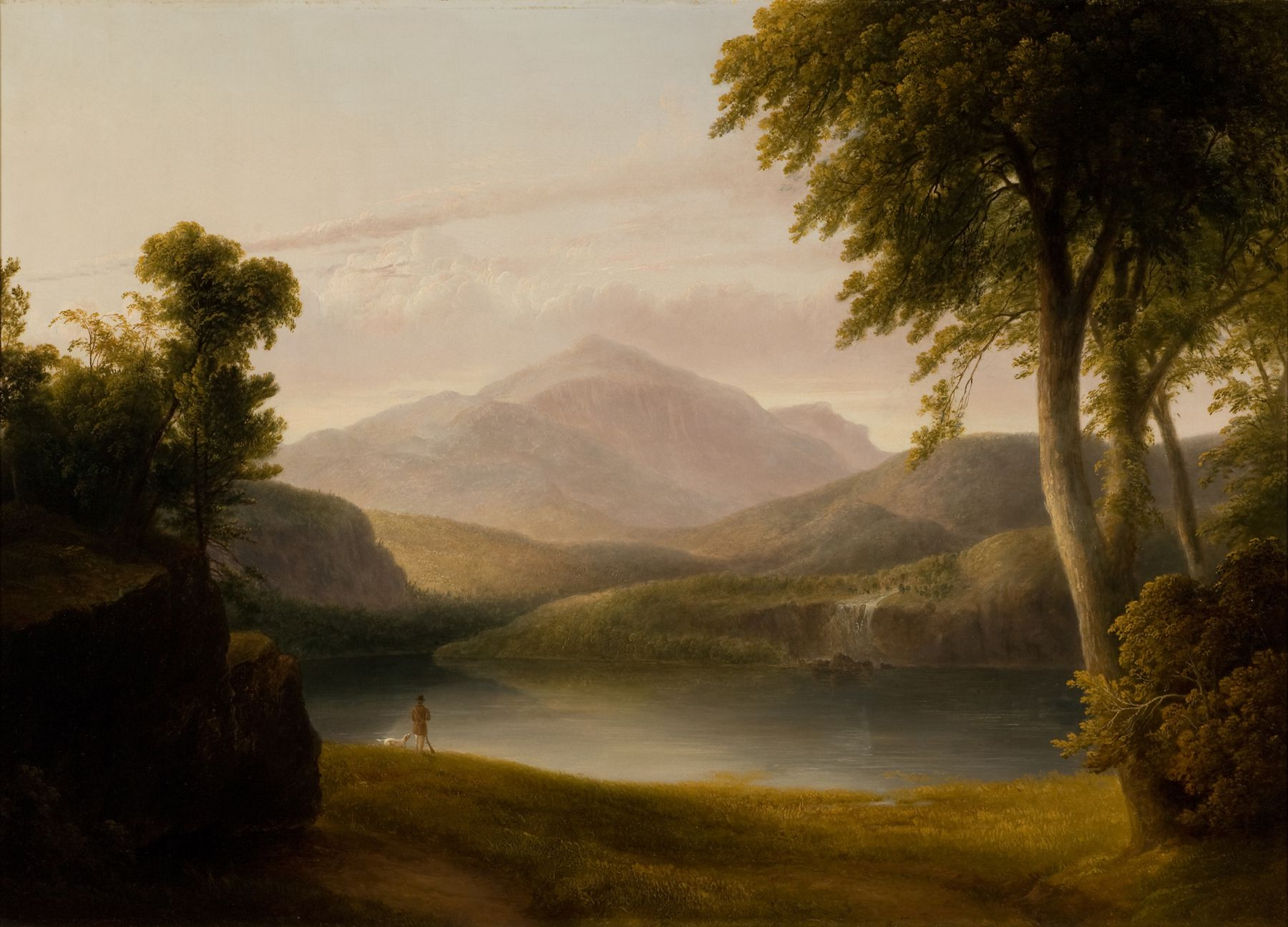
In the Catskills, 1836, Reynolda House Museum of American Art

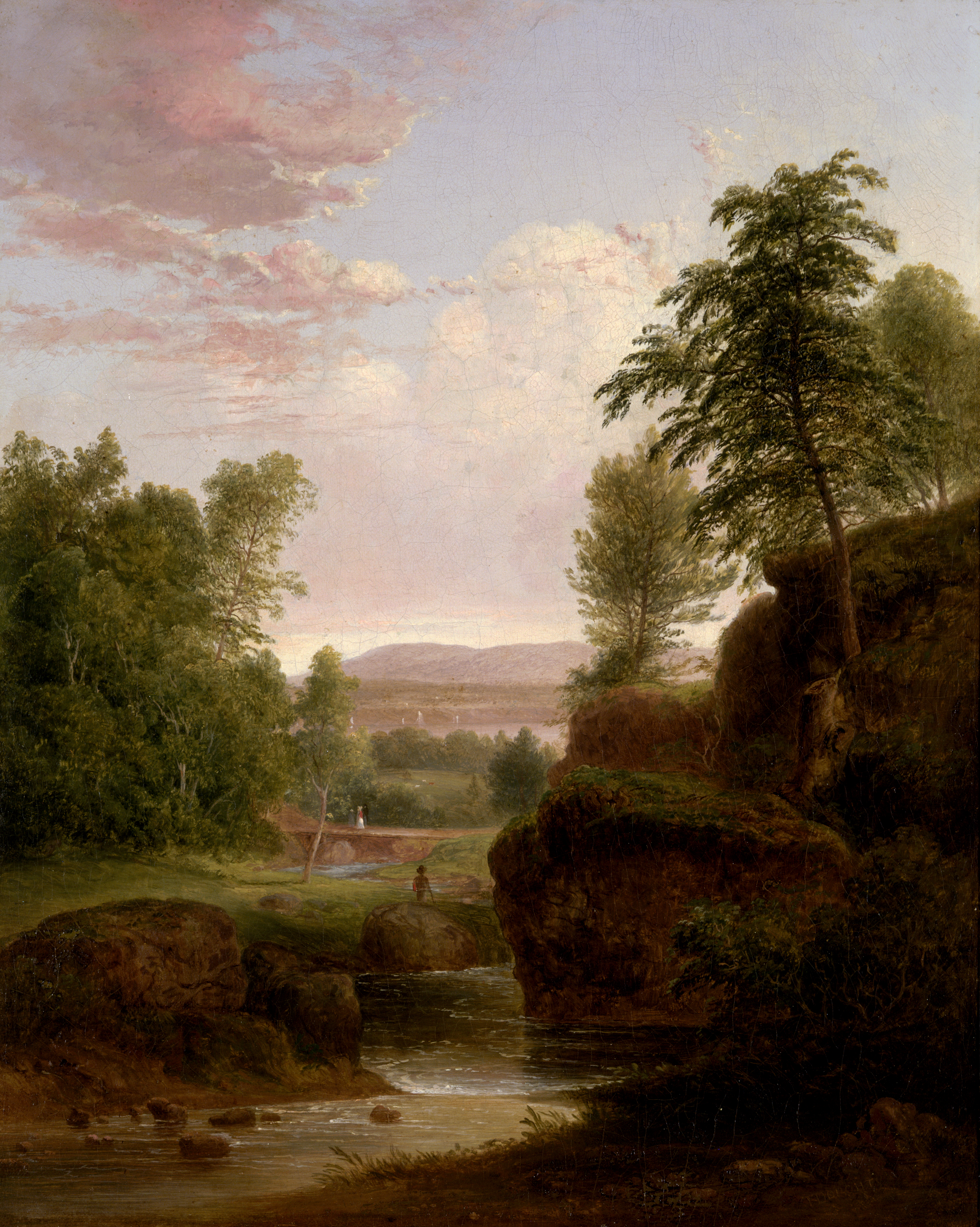
View toward the Hudson River, 1839, Princeton University Art Museum

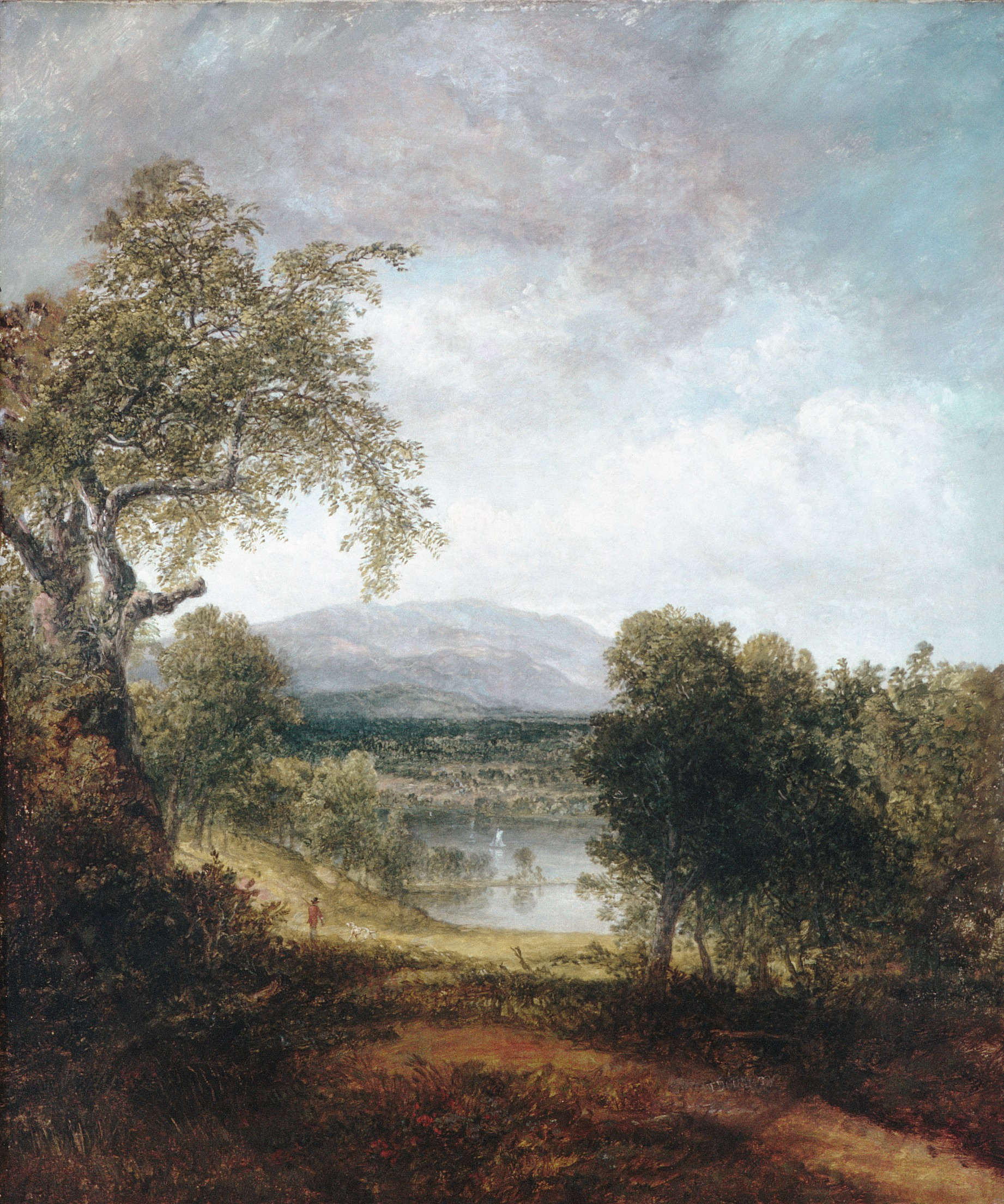
A River Glimpse, 1842–1850, Metropolitan Museum of Art

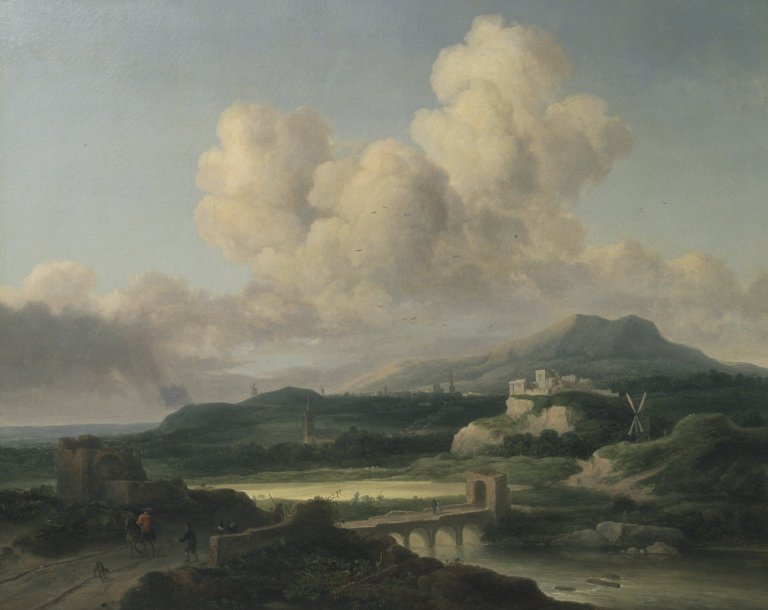
Landscape after Ruisdael, ca. 1846, Brooklyn Museum

== See also ==
- List of Hudson River School artists
