= William Guy Wall =

American painter (1792–1864)

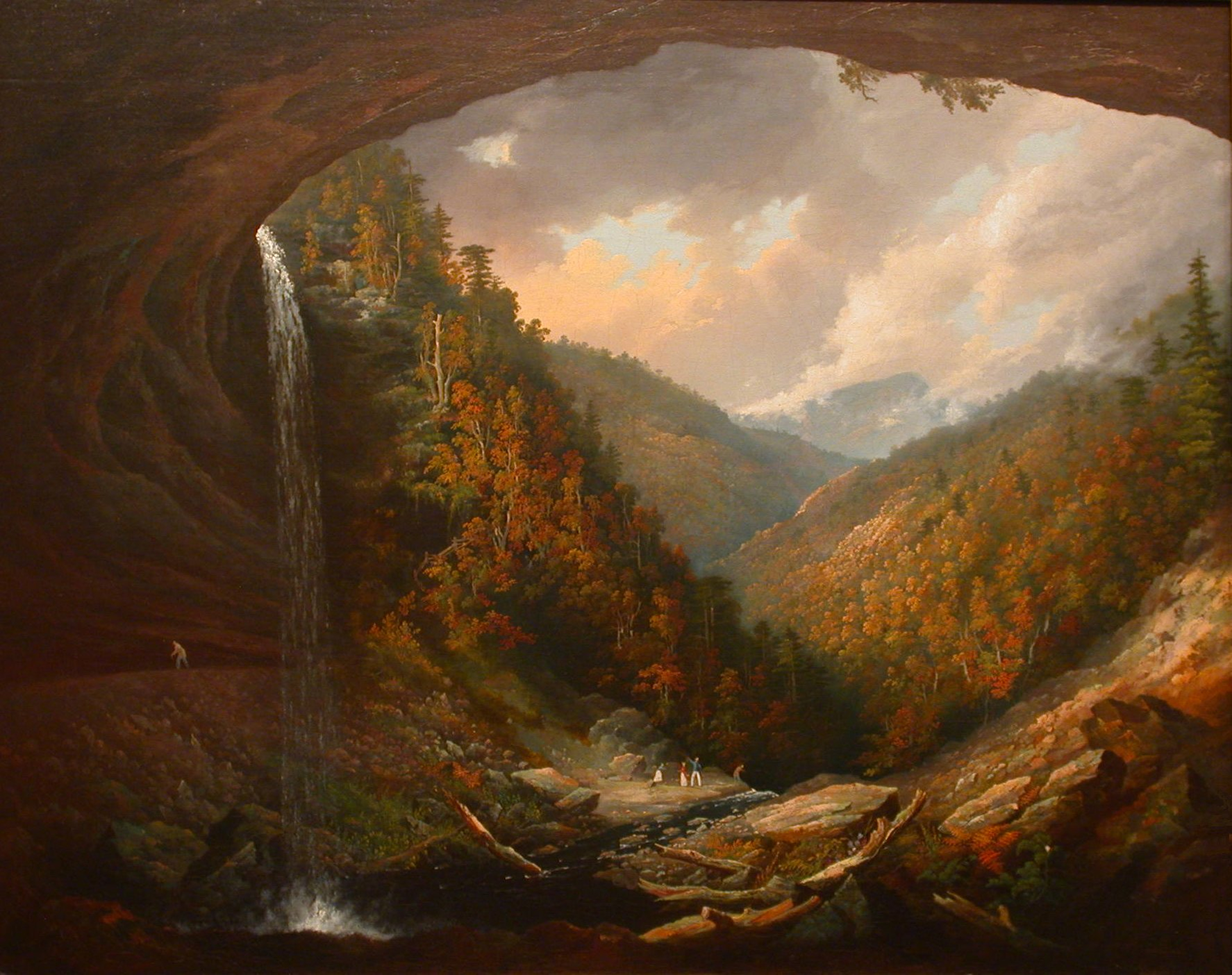
Cauterskill Falls on the Catskill Mountains, by William Guy Wall, 1826–27, Honolulu Museum of Art

William Guy Wall (1792–1864) was an American painter of Irish birth.

Wall was born in Dublin in 1792 and arrived in New York in 1812. He was already a well trained artist and soon became well known for his sensitive watercolor views of the Hudson River Valley and surroundings. Some of these watercolors were published as engravings by John Hill and his son John William Hill in the Hudson River Portfolio (New York, 1821–1825), one of the first publications to make Americans aware of the beauty of their own country. Wall's landscapes (and a few seascapes) were straightforward representations of America's awe-inspiring vistas—neither romanticized nor idealized. He is classified as either a forerunner or an early member of the Hudson River School. His paintings were popular during his lifetime and many sold for prices between three and four hundred dollars – high for the period. At least two of his paintings were engraved and published in The Atlantic Souvenir annual gift book in the late 1820s.

Wall was a founding member of the National Academy of Design (New York), where fifty-nine of his paintings were exhibited over twenty-five years. He also exhibited frequently at such institutions as the Pennsylvania Academy of the Fine Arts (Philadelphia) and the Apollo Association (New York). He lived in America from 1812 to 1835 and again from 1856 to 1860. He returned to Ireland in 1860 and died in Dublin in 1864. William Guy Wall's son, William Archibald Wall (1828–1878), was also a landscape painter.

The Amon Carter Museum (Fort Worth, Texas), the Honolulu Museum of Art, the Hudson River Museum (Yonkers, New York), the Metropolitan Museum of Art and the New-York Historical Society are among the public collections having paintings by William Guy Wall.
