= Sylvester Rosa Koehler =

German-born American author

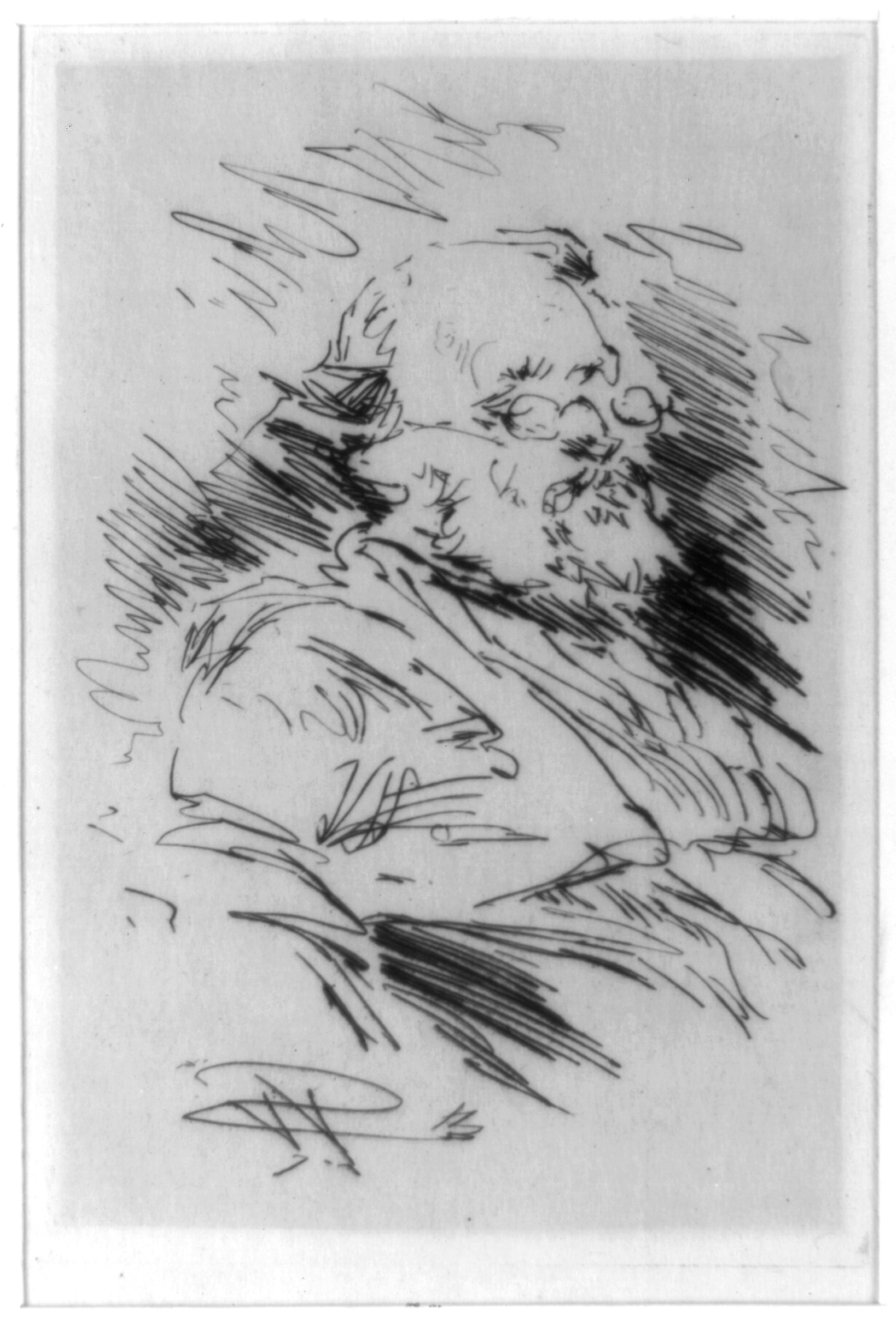
- etching by Walter Shirlaw, 1880
- Born: 11 February 1837; Leipzig
- Died: 15 September 1900; Littleton
- Occupation: Curator

Sylvester Rosa Koehler (11 February 1837 – 15 September 1900) was a German-born American author and museum curator. He was the first curator of prints at the Museum of Fine Arts, Boston.

== Biography ==
He was born in Leipzig. His grandfather was a musician and composer of note, and his father an artist. Koehler emigrated to the United States in 1849 after he had received the rudiments of a classical education. He moved to the Boston area in 1868, residing for a time in Roxbury, Massachusetts, and became a technical manager at L. Prang & Company for 10 years. He edited the American Art Review while it existed (1879–81), and commissioned original etchings for the magazine.

He made many contributions on art to periodicals in the United States and Europe. He published translations of von Betzold's Theory of Color, edited by Prof. Edward C. Pickering (Boston, 1876), Lalanne's Treatise on Etching, with notes (1880), and was the author of Art Education and Art Patronage in the United States (1882), and Etching, an Outline of its Technical Processes and its History, with Some Remarks on Collections and Collecting (New York, 1885). Koehler wrote the text for Original Etchings by American Artists (1883), Twenty Original American Etchings (1884) and American Art (in press, 1887). He also edited the United States Art Directory and Year Book for 1882 and 1884. From 1887, he was engaged in writing a comprehensive history of color printing, a work that remained unfinished at the time of his death.

Through his work on the American Art Review, his writings, and exhibitions he organized, he helped foster a revival of etching in the United States in the 1880s. He became acting curator for the prints department at the MFA, Boston, in 1885 and regular curator in 1887. He was curator of graphic arts at the Smithsonian in Washington, D. C., from 1886 to 1900. He gave a series of eight lectures on "Engraving" for the Lowell Institute's 1893–94 season. He bequeathed his considerable library and print collection to the MFA. He died in 1900 in Littleton, New Hampshire.
