= Frederick Winthrop Faxon =

American bibliographer and publisher (1866–1936)

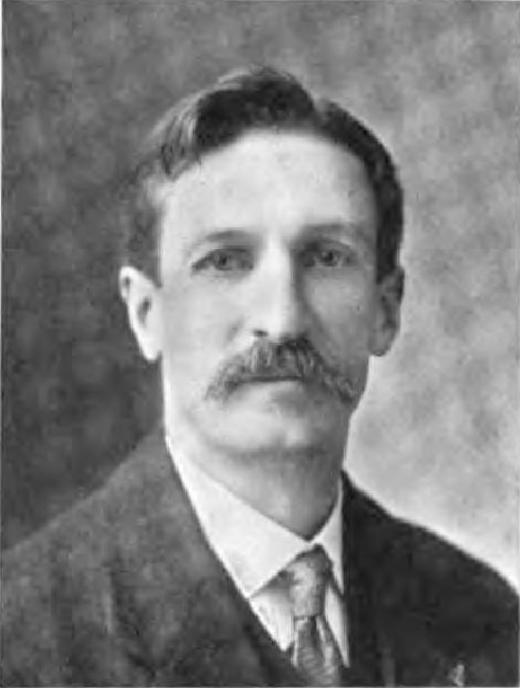
- Born: August 24, 1866; Boston, Massachusetts, US
- Died: August 31, 1936 (aged 70); Boston, Massachusetts
- Education: Harvard College (BA)
- Occupations: Bibliographer, publisher, businessman
- Organization: F. W. Faxon Company

Frederick Winthrop Faxon (August 24, 1866 – August 31, 1936) was an American bibliographer, publisher, businessman, and owner-operator of F. W. Faxon Publishing Company, which worked with libraries (its chief customers) for over a century. Faxon served as Secretary of the American Library Association from 1900 to 1902.

== Life and career ==
Faxon was born in the West Roxbury neighborhood of Boston, Massachusetts, on August 24, 1866, to Marcus and Augusta Chalmers Fernald Faxon. He graduated Boston Latin School in 1885 and received his bachelor's degree from Harvard College in 1889. That year, he accepted a job in Soule & Bugbee, a company that published law books. He rose through the ranks from library department manager in 1902 to director in 1911 to president and treasurer in 1913. He purchased the firm (then named the Boston Book Company) in 1918 and changed its name to the F. W. Faxon Company. He ran the company until his death on August 31, 1936. His cousin-in-law, Albert H. Davis Sr., who had joined the company in 1929, took over the company after Faxon's death. The company continued as a serials subscription agent and publisher before struggling financially in the 1990s and filing for bankruptcy and ceasing operations in 2003.

Although he never worked in a library, Faxon had a lifelong passion for supporting librarians and researchers. He edited, compiled, and contributed to many of the bibliographies he published. He was particularly interested in the history of American magazines and serials. His publishing company produced the Bulletin of Bibliography starting in 1897, the Bibliography of Ephemeral Bibelots (launched in 1897), Modern Chap Books and Their Imitators (1903), Useful Reference Series of Books (launched in 1907), Annual Magazine Subject Index (1907–1949), Dramatic Index (1909–1949), Checklist of Popular English and American Periodicals (1908), A Bibliography of Literary Annuals and Gift Books (1912), and other series.

Faxon was active in the American Library Association (ALA), serving as Secretary (the equivalent of executive director) from 1900 to 1902, Travel Secretary from 1896 to 1900, Travel Committee chair from 1902 to 1934, and official delegate to the 1912 meeting of the Library Association of Great Britain in Liverpool. He attended 43 ALA conferences over the years and served as an unofficial conference photographer, taking hundreds of candid shots of librarians enjoying learning and leisure activities.

Faxon was a member of the Bibliographical Society of America, the Appalachian Mountain Club, the Massachusetts Library Club (which he served as president from 1931 to 1932), the New York Library Association, and other societies.

He married Adeline True Thompson in Boston on May 16, 1901.
