= Petros Mengous =

Greek-American author and teacher

- Born: 1802; Koukloutzas, Ottoman Empire
- Died: after 1850
- Allegiance: (Greece) First Hellenic Republic
- Branch: Hellenic Navy; Hellenic Army
- Rank: Private
- Known for: Narrative of a Greek Soldier
- Conflicts: Greek War of Independence: Siege of Patras (1821); First battle of Kompoti (1821); First siege of Missolonghi

Petros Mengous (Greek: Πέτρος Μέγγους; (1802- ) was a Greek soldier, pirate, author, and educator. He fought in the Greek War of Independence for over five years and migrated to the United States, where he wrote a narrative of his experience, telling the American people about the horrors of the Greek War in the book Narrative of a Greek Soldier published in 1830. Petros spoke Modern and Classical Greek, Arabic, Italian, and French. He eventually taught at the Mount Pleasant Classical Institute with Gregory Anthony Perdicaris. American missionary Jonas King married his sister Anna Aspasia Mengou on the Island of Tinos, where King built his first women's school.

Petros was born in Smyrna, to Eleftherius "Levtrachi" Mengous in a small Greek village named Koukloutzas. Koukloutzas was a small village in Ottoman Turkey primarily inhabited by Greeks in the early 1800s. After the onset of the Greek War of Independence, Petros served in the Greek Army and Navy. He provided support and raised money to help free slaves, and he kept a chronicle of the events that transpired during the war. Petros migrated to the United States in 1828 and eventually traveled to New Orleans, where he worked on a ship in the Gulf of Mexico. During the period, New Orleans had a large Greek community consisting primarily of the Dimitry Family of New Orleans.

== Early life ==
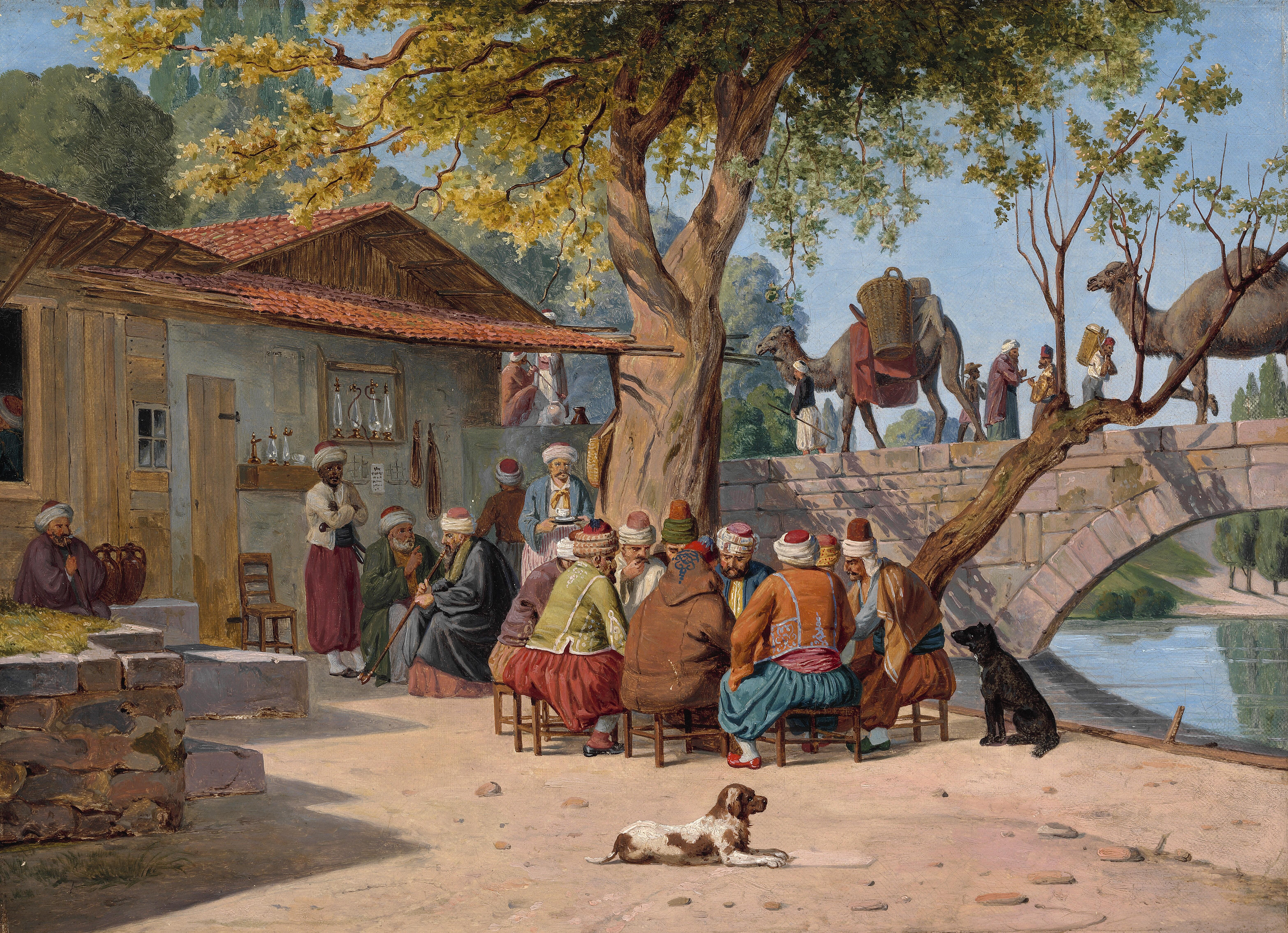
Life in Smyrna in the 1800s

Petros Mengous was born to a Greek merchant named Eleftherius "Levtrachi" Mengous in a small Greek village named Koukloutzas in the Bornova district of İzmir in 1802. Eleftherius had a massive library of books, and he was educated. Petros was raised on a vineyard that was over 20 acres, which yielded over one thousand gallons of wine annually. He spent the first fourteen years of his life in the small village of Koukloutzas, but the family also maintained a home in Smyrna. Petros was educated with many of the children of the village by a priest in a school that was at the entrance of the local church, but he also attended the prestigious Academy of Kydonies in Ayvalık, Turkey, for several months which was founded by Benjamin of Lesbos and Theophilos Kairis.

When he was twelve in 1814, he traveled to Afyonkarahisar, a village known for its poppy and the raising of opium. Petros also traveled to Constantinople in 1812, 1815, 1816, 1817, 1819, and 1824. Sadly, his brother died around 1818 at the age of thirteen.

Petros was influenced by the teachings of Greek priest, theologian, and scholar Constantine Oikonomos (1780–1857), who lived in Smyrna. On one occasion, Petros witnessed over 6000 Greeks attend one of his lectures in Smyrna. In the early 1800s, Oikonomos was arrested and accused of rebellion against the Ottoman Empire. Oikonomos, along with the Greeks of Smyrna, founded a school promoting Lancasterian principles, which they learned from the Greeks of Wallachia. Petros attended the School of Oikonomos. The school was under the protection of the British Consul. He was also influenced by Konstantinos Koumas who was also in Smyrna.

== Greek War of Independence ==
=== Onset ===
Greeks had a hard time living within the Ottoman Empire, and they were lower-class citizens. No Turk ever entered the house of a Greek. Turks never entered Greek hospitals. When Petros was a young age, he could not play with Turkish children because they kept asking him if he would become a Turk. He was afraid to reply because they legally could whip him in the street, and other Turks in the street would run up and form a lynch mob, possibly killing him without legal repercussions.

When the Greek War of Independence broke out, many Greeks fled the city and feared for their lives. Petros' father, Eleftherius, was a resident of Genoa, and Petros obtained a passport to leave Smyrna for Trieste. At the age of nineteen, he was determined to travel to Morea and fight for Greece's independence.

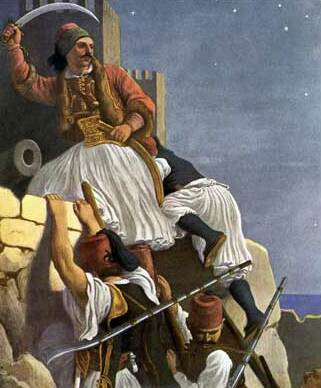
Siege of Patras (1821)

Petros briefly stayed in Trieste with his uncle, who lost property in Laconia over sixty years prior due to the Turkish occupation. He was from the village of Geraki. In Trieste, Petros managed to acquire two pistols and a sword in preparation for battle. He traveled to Missolonghi, where Greece established a strategic base as early as 1821 under the leadership of Alexandros Mavrokordatos.

Petros traveled to Patras and participated in the Siege of Patras (1821) but had to flee the city when it fell to the Ottomans in April 1821. After the loss of Patras, Petros traveled to Arta, where he participated in the First Battle of Kompoti 1821 fighting alongside Georgios Karaiskakis in June and July 1821. Petros was with him when the Greek hero received a wound in his buttocks after mooning the enemy. Six days later, in the same region, Petros witnessed the Turkish cavalry fighting battles for the first time in his life. Petros and the Greek soldiers formed a tambouri where they lay concealed and their arms prepared. After five days of battle, Petros and the Greek company retreated after fifteen hundred Turks joined the battle.

=== Hellenic Navy ===
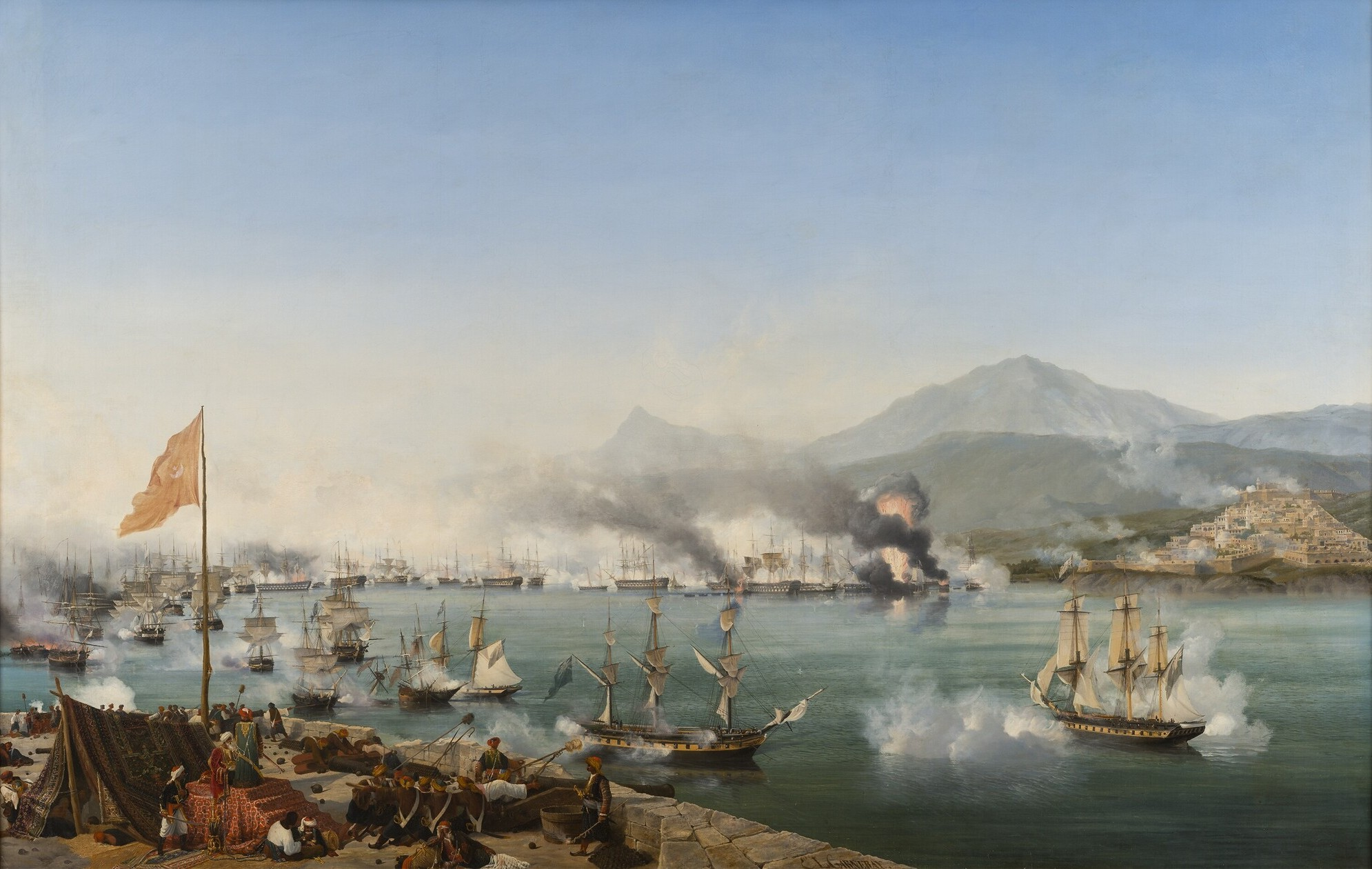
Example of Hellenic Naval Force during Greek Indendence

Petros joined the Hellenic Navy sometime after his early experience with the impoverished Greek forces. During his experience, Petros was exposed to the harshest conditions and ate one flour ration daily. Petros was determined to join the Hellenic Navy and approached a vessel speaking with one of the relatives of Commander Andreas Miaoulis named Alexandros. Upon examination, the naval officer knew Petros' father, Levtrachi. Petros was welcomed on board the fleet of Hydra, and he was introduced to Commander Andreas Miaoulis, who was also acquainted with his father. Because Petros was educated, the commander made him ship clerk, and he was in charge of the ship's journal.

Petros received a state room, and he ate bread, cheese, and wine for breakfast. For dinner, the young sailor ate fresh meat with bread and wine. The latter lighter meal, known as supper, was composed of small salted fish, called sardelis, with more wine.

Petros and the Hellenic Navy of Hydra participated in a small naval skirmish around Patras and eventually formed a blockade with the Greek fleet at the port of Patras in April 1822.

Regretably, the sailors were at sea for seven months and in need of repairs during this time. The local government could not furnish provisions for the sailors. Petros wrote letters to foreign dignitaries for Commander Miaoulis. The fleet eventually traveled back to Hydra for repairs and provisions.

Petros became acquainted with Vice Admiral Georgios Sachtouris (1783–1841), who was also from Hydra. When they arrived in Hydra, Petros noticed Miaoulis had twenty-five vessels in the port while Sacturis had sixteen ships anchored on the eastern port.

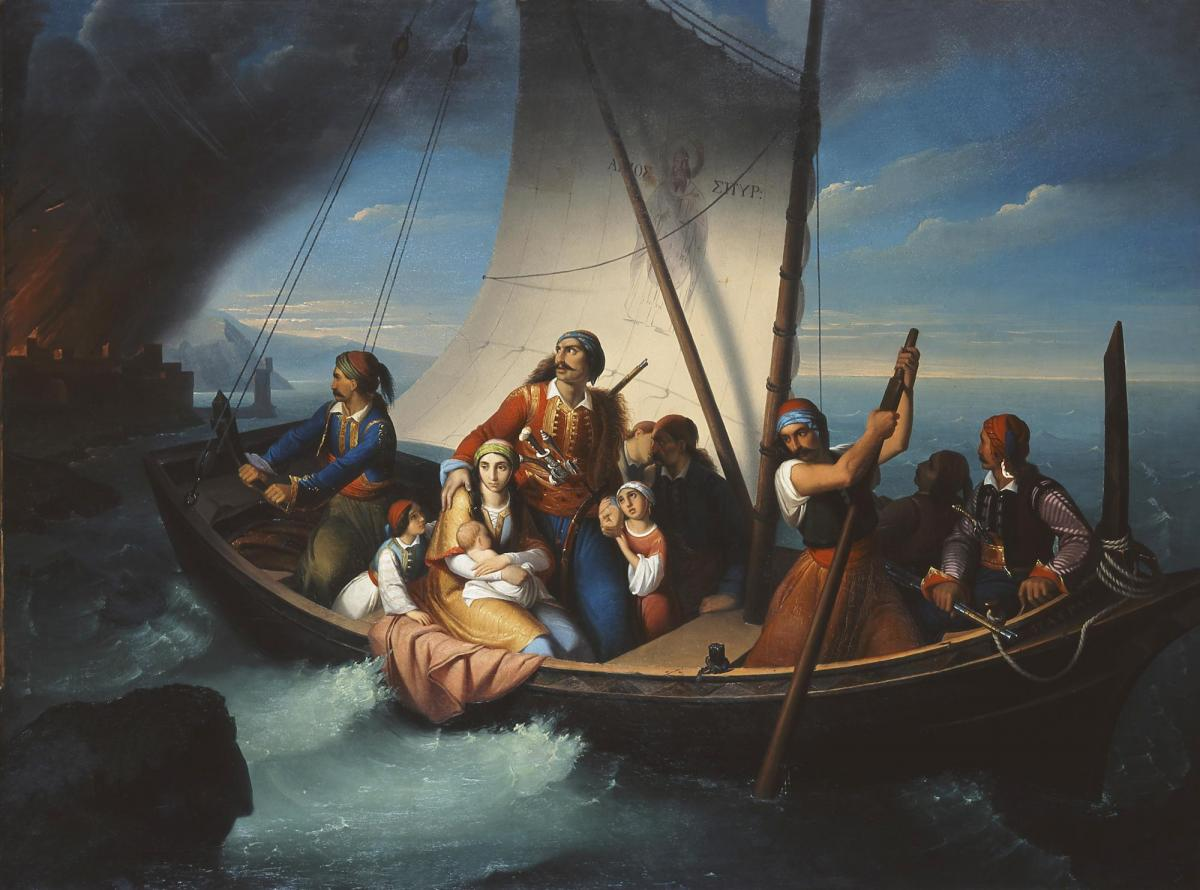
Greeks fleeing on boat during Greek War of Independence

The fleet of Hydra was a large size, numbering over 41 vessels. News reached Hydra of the failing efforts of the Samiotes Naval Ships to protect Chios while the massacre was taking place from March to August 1822.

The people asked Miaoulis for aid, and he assembled a small group and left Hydra within three days of their arrival to provide aid to the suffering people.

Petros joined Sachtouris' vessel en route to aid the people of Chios. The ship raised the new flag of Greece, and twenty vessels reached Ipasris, including that of Miaoulis.

Petros landed in Chios with the fleet, providing aid to any victims they could find. Petros witnessed the horrors of the Chios massacre firsthand and saw the countless corpses of women, children, priests, and other poor Greek individuals who resisted. The Naval group saved innocent people, bringing them to Ipsara during the several weeks they were in the region. Several Europeans on board the ship were discussing an international coalition composed of foreigners to fight for Greece in Argos called the Philhellenic Tagma (Φιλελληνικό Τάγμα).

=== Officer ===
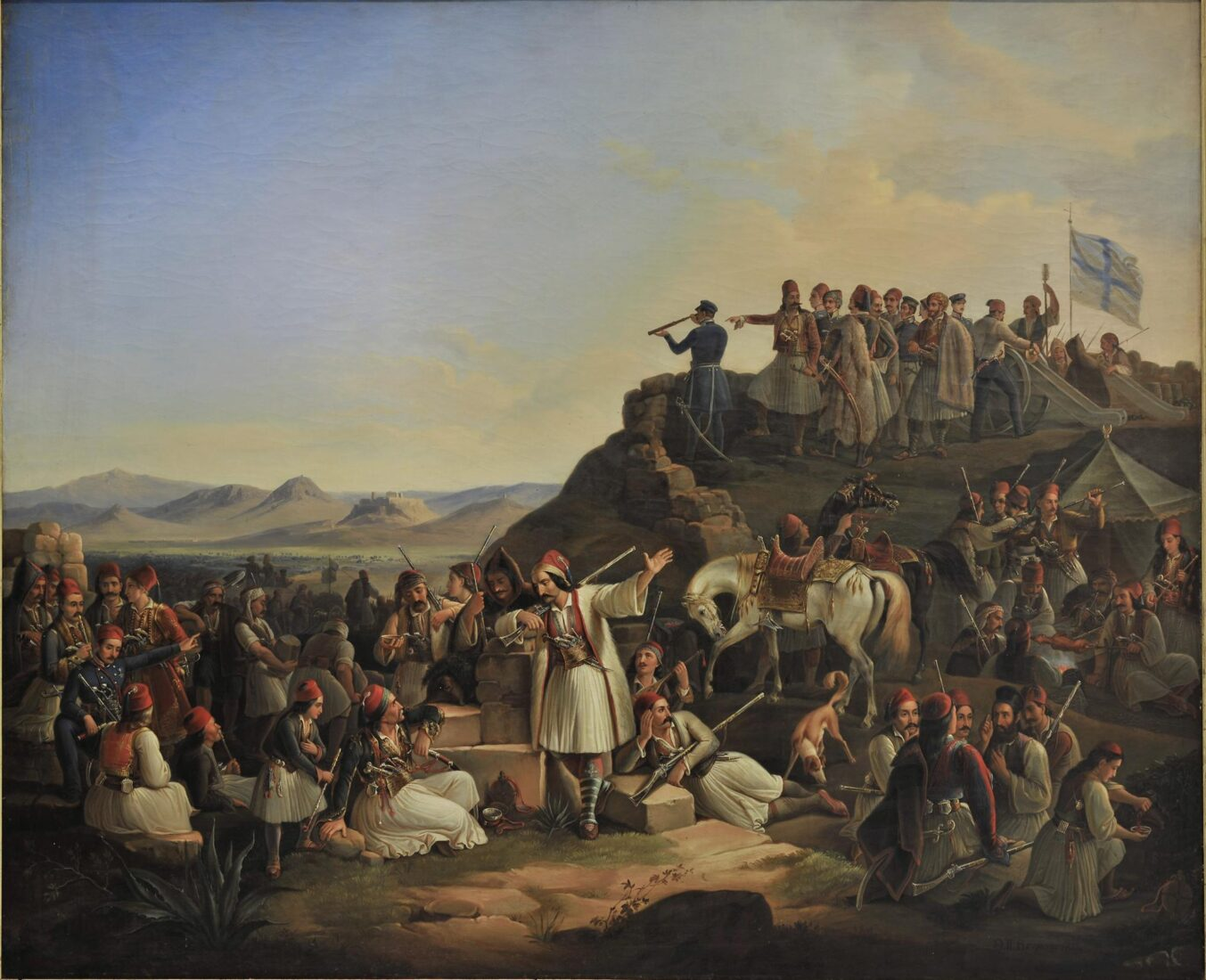
Example of Greek base during Greek War of Independence

Petros eventually arrived in Argos, and he applied to the minister of war Ioannis Kolettis for permission to join the foreign corps. Petros was given an officer's brevet and was promised the corresponding pay. He reported to a Frenchman in command of the Philhellenic Tagma (Φιλελληνικό Τάγμα) named Blondel. The unit was ground warfare, and Petros lost his comfortable accommodations on board the naval ships. The unit's biggest hurdle was finding food.

Petros participated in the First siege of Missolonghi and was sick on Christmas Eve in 1822 while the Turks made a regular assault on his location. He briefly met Markos Botsaris before his death at the Battle of Karpenisi. It was July 1823, and Petros was with a group of foreign fighters providing support for Gennaios Kolokotronis in Morea, who led fifteen hundred irregular troops.

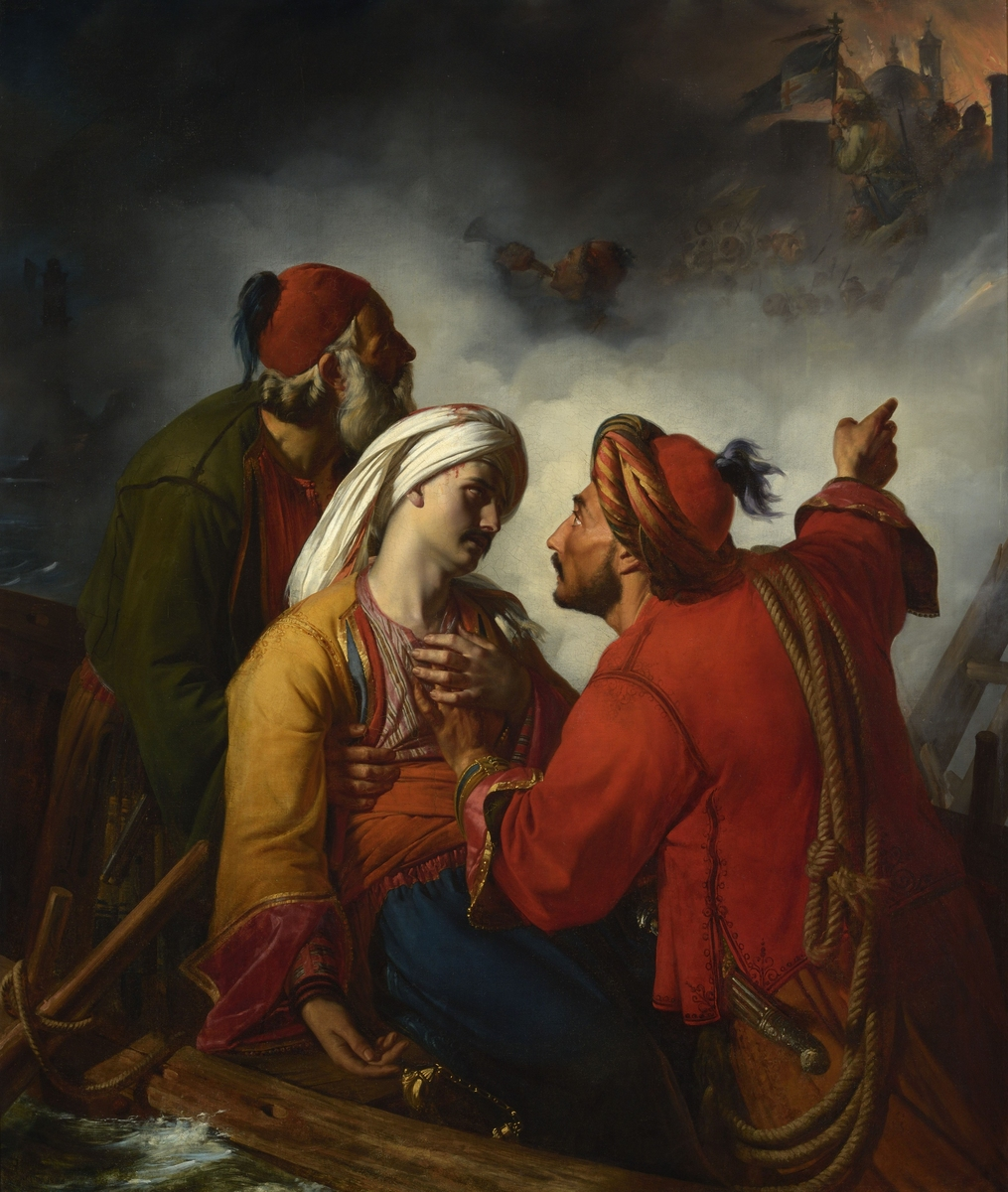
Wounded Officer

During battle, Petros' battalion fled and found refuge in a small monastery with 40 monks, who aided them during their escape from capture by the Turks.

Petros returned to Hydra, where he briefly received the hospitality of an Italian lawyer and Philhellene named Giuseppe Giappi, who later became a critical figure in the founding of the Greek state.

Petros desired to return to Smyrna and adopted the persona of a Frenchman to evade authorities, eventually obtaining a French Passport. He traveled back home via the island of Dino. His parents remained confined in their home for weeks at a time during the Greek War of Independence, and his sister never left the house due to the constant danger to the Greek population.

Petros stayed in Smyrna for a short period before taking cargo to the island of Crete in the later part of 1823, where he remained for nine months with the revolutionary fighters of Sfakia known as Sfakiotes. Petros took arms with the small group of brigands and also helped hand out flour to feed the poor, destitute inhabitants.

After a long stay in Crete by 1824, Petros successfully migrated to the island of Syros, where he encountered several old acquaintances from Smyrna and his village Koukloutzas.

=== From Slavery to Freedom ===
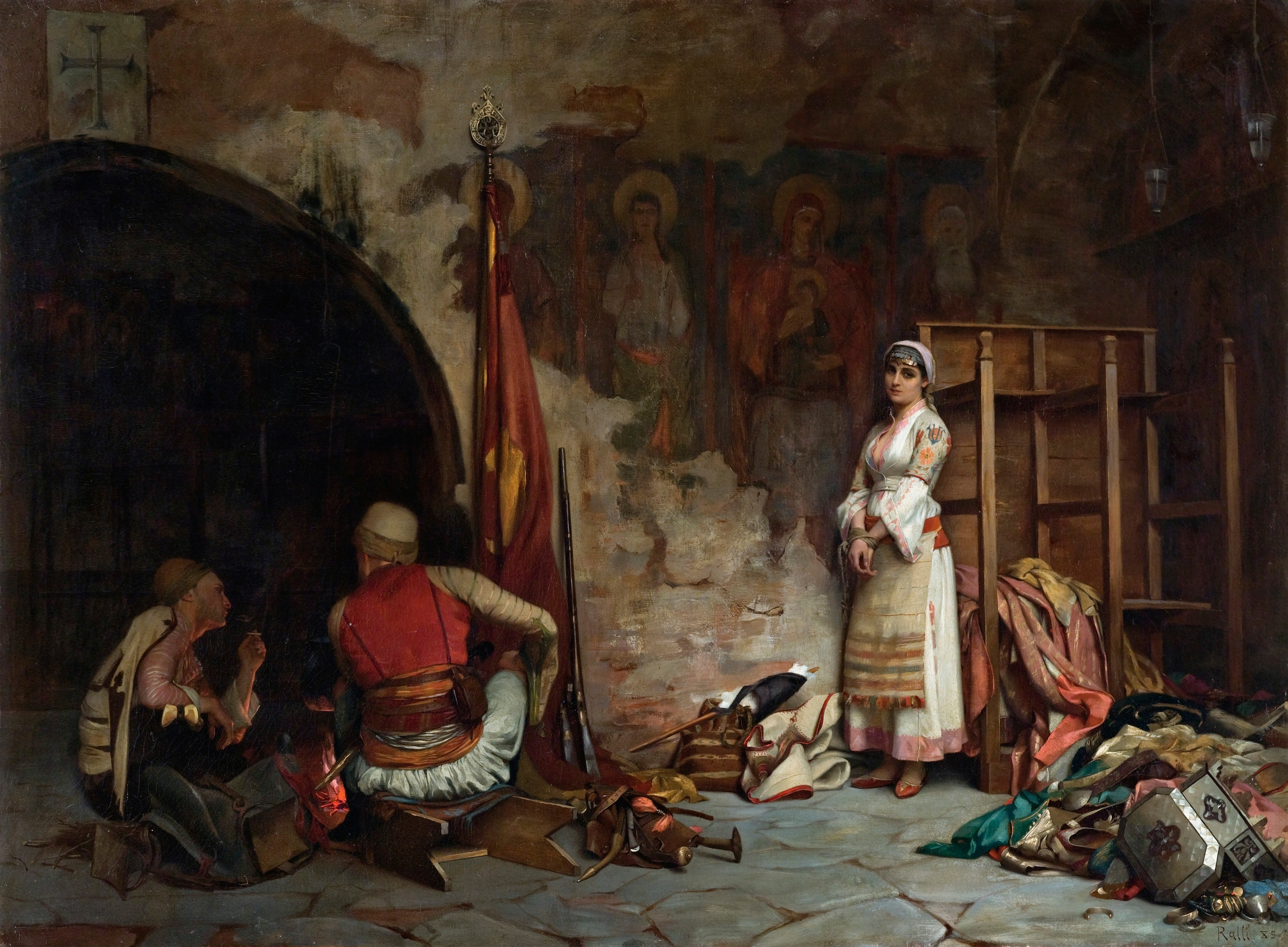
Enslaved Greek Woman

Petros also met a young man named Costandí Arápis from Ipsara on the island of Syros who lost his wife and small infant to slavery. Petros wanted to return to Smyrna and promised the young man he would inquire about his wife and infant. He took an Ionian vessel and met another gentleman named Nicholas from Ipsara, who lost his sisters to Ottoman slavery. Both of the young men had foreign passports and were able to travel the sophisticated Ottoman landscape freely. Greeks had a hard time traveling due to the war. Thousands of people were sold in public markets. Petros and Nicholas were on their way to Smyrna when the wind, by some miracle, brought them to the capital of the Greek island of Lesvos, Mytilini. The two wanderers inquired about enslaved people from Ipsara and were told twelve women were in a house awaiting to be sold, who were under the guard of an elderly Greek woman. Nicholas found his sisters, but did not have the money to liberate them. Petros and Nicholas returned to Smyrna to organize the funds.

David Offley (1779–1838), an American philanthropist and philhellene, offered to assist in the liberation of his sisters and paid the ransom. Petros also located the loved ones of Costandí Arápis. He purchased them for a sizable amount of money, and they were safely returned to him.

=== Aftermath, End of War ===
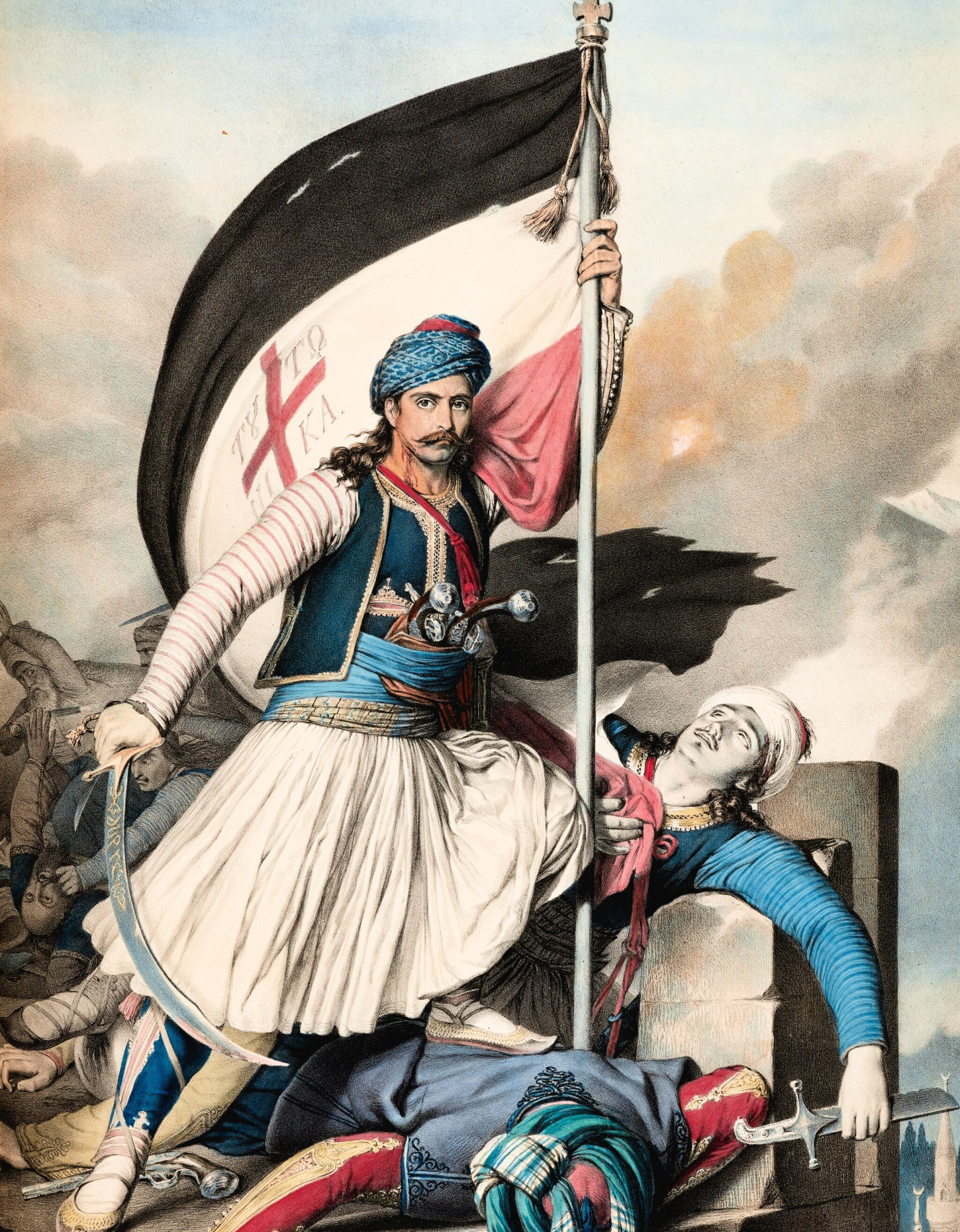
Greek Soldier

Petros returned to Crete with supplies that were sent by the Greek government in 1824, including shoes and boots. On his travels all over war-torn Greece, Petros met countless people. Some of their stories were chronicled in his book. He travelled on a schooner to different ports of Crete, giving out supplies. Petros briefly travelled to Egypt from Crete with a small ship crew, where they confiscated two Turkish brigs and received prize money. Petros returned to Crete.

During the final four years of the Greek War of Independence, Petros travelled extensively through the war-torn country, interacting with people from diverse backgrounds. Petros constantly witnessed Greek slavery firsthand, human brutality, and poverty. In one instance, he witnessed a woman running towards the shore who had just escaped capture with her ears and nose cut off. Regretably, the Turks still had her daughter. The woman died after two days. Petros served in the Greek War of Independence for over five years. He received five dollars in pay and thirteen dollars in prize money from seizing enemy ships and supplies.

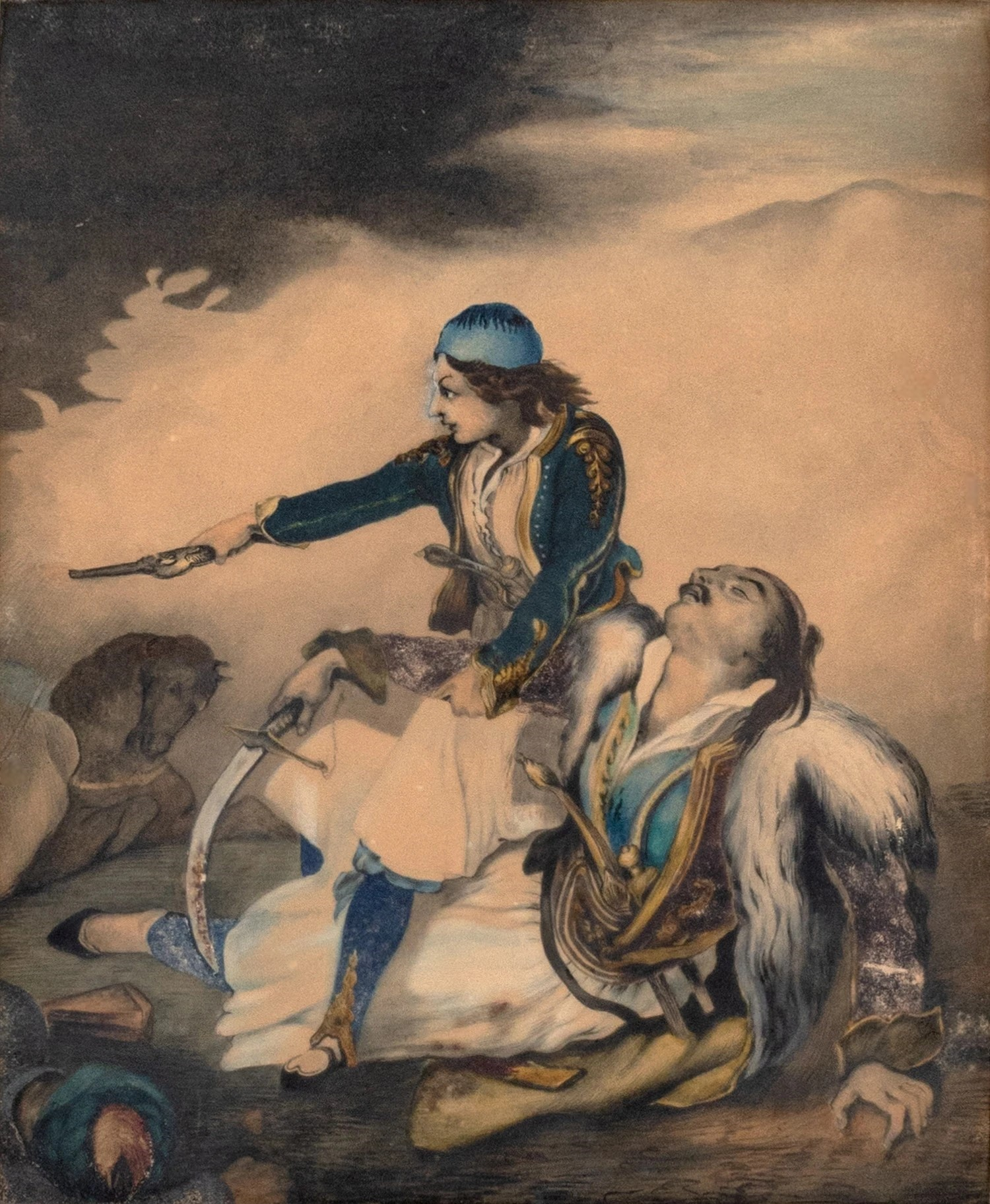
Greek Child Soldier

Sometimes, Petros was subjected to committing acts of piracy because Austrian supply ships supporting Turkish forces were easy targets. Petros independently raised money to travel and help Greeks in need.

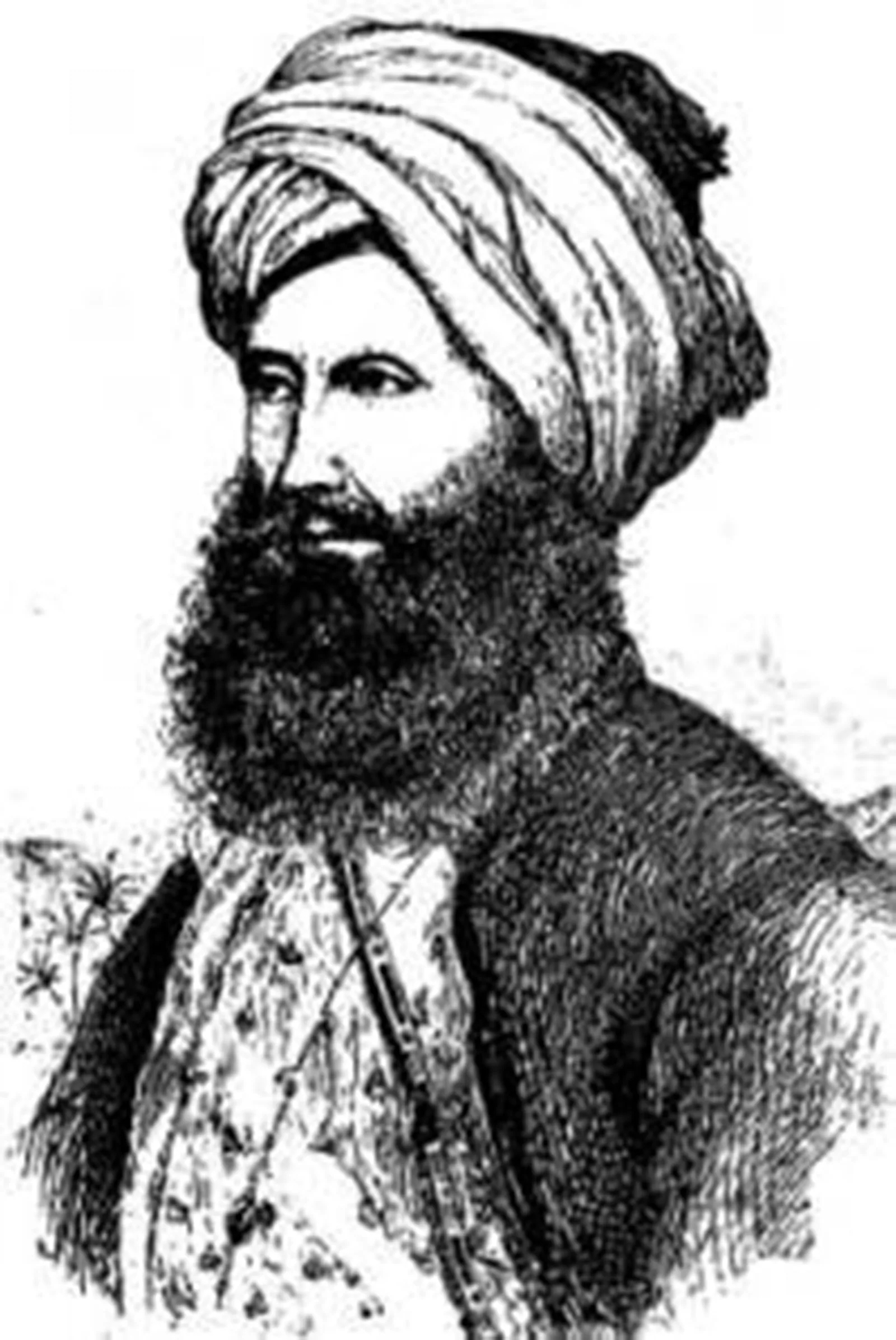
Petros' brother-in-law Jonas King

Petros and most struggling Greeks saw the end of the Greek war actually occurring on October 20, 1827, after a decisive victory at the Battle of Navarino, which obliterated the Ottoman-Egyptian fleet. Petros returned to Smyrna. The Greeks were winning the war, and the event led to an armistice and international recognition known as the London Protocol on November 16, 1828.

American missionary Jonas King arrived in Smyrna and had a golden tongue. The young missionary mesmerised the local Greek community in Smyrna, including Greek priests, and eventually won the support of Petros and his family. Jonas eventually married Petros' sister Anna Aspasia. Petros travelled to the United States of America along with American minister and author Josiah Brewer to be more useful to the people of Greece.

== Migration to the United States ==
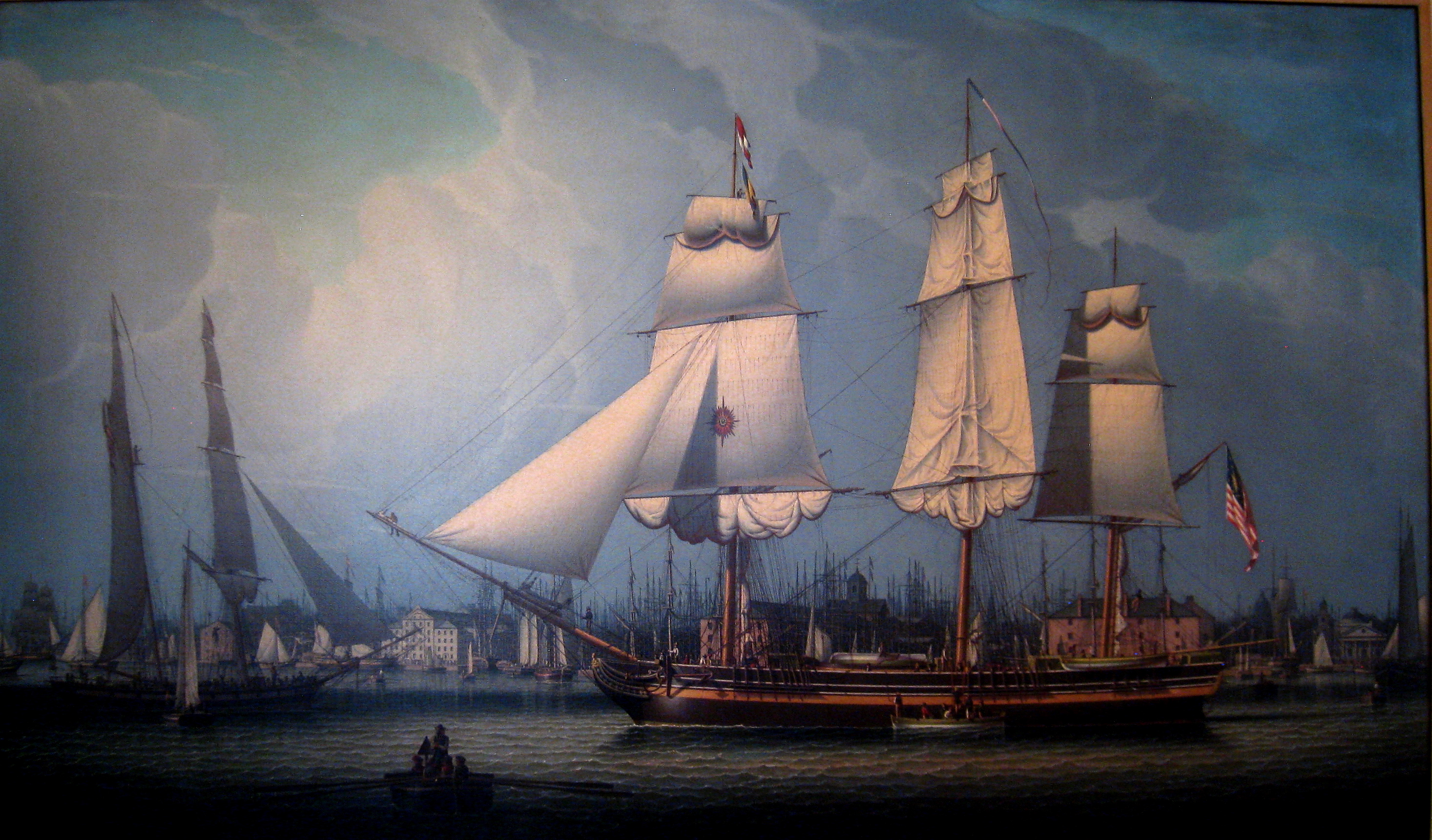
Boston Harbor in 1829

Petros arrived in Boston, Massachusetts, on Tuesday, July 15, 1828, on the ship Camilla with Greek American academic Evangelinos Apostolides Sophocles. He spoke Arabic, Italian, French, Modern and Classical Greek. He traveled to Amherst, Massachusetts, where he taught along with Gregory Anthony Perdicaris at the Mount Pleasant Classical Institute. Some of his students included Greek refugees: Abolitionist and women's rights activist John Celivergos Zachos, author and lecturer Christophoros Plato Kastanes, author Alexandros Georgios Paspates, Constantine Fundulakes Newell, and Christopher Evangeles. In 1829, the American missionary named Jonas King married Petros' sister Anna Aspasia Mengous on the island of Tinos. Anna Mengous was the head of the Ladies' School at Tinos for Ancient Greek, which was established by Jonas.

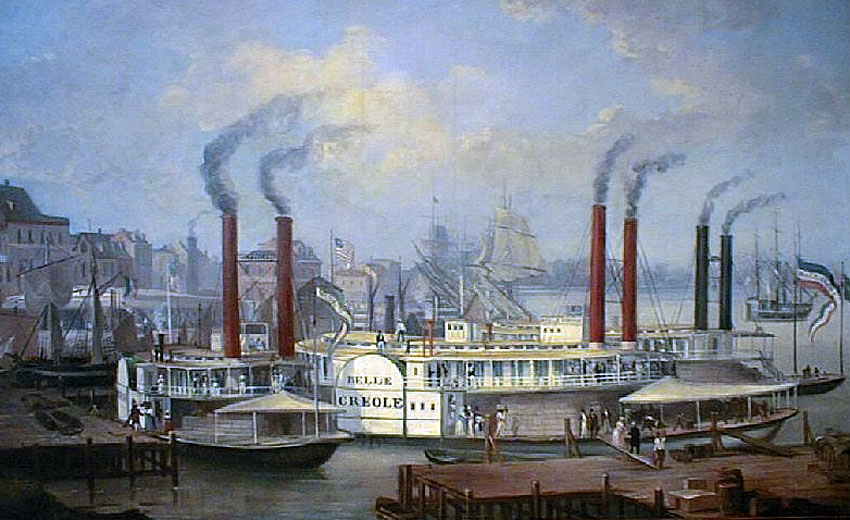
New Orleans Wharf 1800s

Petros completed a memoir of his early life in Smyrna, which was published in 1830 entitled Narrative of a Greek Soldier. By 1831, he was living in New Orleans, Louisiana, where he was employed as a captain's clerk on board a steam ship traveling the Mississippi River and the Gulf of Mexico.

Petros' was hard to reach in New Orleans, and his brother-in-law Jonas published a few advertisements in local papers seeking his whereabouts. His father, Eleftherius, passed away on April 6, 1837, and he had to return to Smyrna because his mother wanted to see him. Petros returned to Smyrna in 1839. Another article was published on November 16, 1850, suggesting that Petros was living in Mexico or California.

Over 20,000 Greeks were living in Smyrna during Petros's time. One hundred years later, Petros' remaining family was forced to leave the city because of the Population exchange between Greece and Turkey.

== Bibliography ==
- Mengous, Petros (1830). Narrative of a Greek Soldier. New York, NY: Elliott and Palmer.
- Brewer, Josiah (1830). A Residence at Constantinople, in the Year 1827. New Haven, CT: Durrie and Peck.
- Kastanes, Christophoros P. (1851). The Greek Exile, Or, a Narrative of the Captivity and Escape of Christophorus Plato Castanis. Philadelphia, PA: Lippincott, Grambo, & Company.
- Tsoukalas, Constantinos; Kitromilides, Paschalis M. (2021). The Greek Revolution A Critical Dictionary. Cambridge, MA: Harvard University Press. ISBN 9780674987432.
- Mazower, Mark (2022). The Greek Revolution 1821 and the Making of Modern Europe. London, UK: Penguin Publishing Group. ISBN 9780143110934.
- Stephanini, J. (1829). The Personal Narrative of the Sufferings of J. Stephanini. New York: Vanderpool & Cole, Printers.
