= Eleni Küreman =

Turkish photojournalist (1921-2001)

- Born: Eleni Fotiadou; 1921; Cihangir, Beyoğlu, Istanbul, Turkey
- Died: 16 July 2001 (aged 79–80); Istanbul, Turkey
- Resting place: Şişli Greek Orthodox Cemetery
- Occupation: Photojournalism
- Spouse: Kayhan Küreman

Eleni Fotiadou Küreman (née Eleni Fotiadou Greek: Ελένη Φωτιάδου, 1921 – 16 July 2001) was Turkey's first professional female photojournalist. She began her career with the American news agency Associated Press in Turkey and went on to work for numerous newspapers and magazines, including Vakit, Son Posta, Yeni Şafak, Son Dakika and Yeni Gün. She specialized in sports photography and later worked as a crime reporter.

== Early life ==
Eleni Fotiadou was born into a wealthy family in the Cihangir neighborhood of Beyoğlu district in Istanbul, Turkey, in 1921. There is some variance amongst sources on her year of birth, with some suggesting 1923. Her father, Stavro, a merchant, and her mother, Sofya, were both Ottoman Greeks. She had a sister Keti (Çapanoğlu after marriage), a year older than her. Her father died when she was four years old leading her mother to return to her former occupation as seamstress.

She finished middle school at Lycée Français Sainte Pulchérie Istanbul, and completed her secondary education at the Phanar Ioakimio Greek High School for Girls (Turkish: Fener Yoakimyon Rum Kız Lisesi).

== Journalist career ==
She started her career through an acquaintance with an American representative of the news agency Associated Press (AP) in Turkey, who taught her photography. When the American representative was returning to the United States, he gave her an offer to replace him, which she picked up. She bought a Leica camera, and started her photojournalism career at the AP in 1947. She specialized in sports photography and focused on football matches. She was Turkey's first professional female photojournalist.

She is known to have developed different tactics to outsmart her male colleagues. Speaking about her tactics, she said, "When I was a sports reporter, everybody would wait at the goal posts opposite the famous goal keepers whilst I would stand behind them as they were unlikely to let a goal slip in. Male photo reporters would tease me for this but it was me who always caught the best shots. It would always be Eleni who got the only picture when a good goal keeper failed to hold the ball."

The second turning point in her professional career came when she met her high school Turkish literature teacher, Rasim Us, again. Us's brother was the publisher of the newspapers Vakit (later Yeni Akit) and Haber. She accepted an offer as photojournalist at Vakit. She also worked as sports photographer and crime reporter for the newspapers Son Posta, Yeni Şafak, Vakit, Son Dakika and Yeni Gün.

She gave up photojournalism in 1964, when her photography films with the coverage of a fire at the Veliefendi Race Course were plundered in the darkroom by her co-workers. She continued to work as a journalist until her final retirement from her post at the newspaper Yeni Gün in 1972.

== Personal life and Death ==
Eleni Fotiadou married journalist Kayhan Küreman, editor in chief of the Turkish daily,Vakit, whom she met during her time at the newspaper.

She died on 16 July 2001 at the SSK Göztepe Hospital in Istanbul. She was being treated there for an injury she sustained when she fell at home and hit her head on the ground. She was interred at Şişli Greek Orthodox Cemetery following the religious funeral service in the Şişli Greek Orthodox Church.

Vasfiye Özkoçak, the chairwoman of the Social Solidarity Foundation of Journalists, honored her with a commemorative plaque that was given to her husband. Her husband donated her camera and some of her equipment to the TGC Press Media Museum.
