= Ahilya Moshos =

Turkish lawyer and politician (1884–1966)

Member of the Grand National Assembly of Turkey
- In office 1950–1954
- Constituency: Istanbul

Personal details
- Born: 1884 Menguli, Pogon, Ioannina, Ottoman Empire
- Died: 13 December 1966 (aged 81–82) Istanbul, Turkey
- Party: Democrat Party
- Spouse: Anna
- Children: Klio, Zoi
- Occupation: Lawyer, prosecutor, judge

Ahilya Moshos (1884 – 13 December 1966) was an Ottoman-born Turkish lawyer, prosecutor, judge and politician of Greek Orthodox background. He served as a member of the Grand National Assembly of Turkey for Istanbul from 1950 to 1954, representing the Democrat Party. Before entering politics, he held several judicial positions in Istanbul and worked as an independent lawyer. He was also a legal adviser to the Ecumenical Patriarchate of Constantinople.

== Early life and education ==
Ahilya Moshos was born in 1884 in the village of Menguli, in the Pogon district of Ioannina, then part of the Ottoman Empire. His father was Tanaş Efendi (also recorded as Simsar Tanaş Efendi), and his mother was Katerina Hanım. He was registered in Heybeliada, Adalar, on Refahşehit (İsmet Paşa) Street.

After completing his elementary education, he enrolled at the Imperial Ottoman Law School (Mekteb-i Hukuk-u Devlet-i Aliyye-i Osmaniye) in Istanbul. While studying law, he began working on 31 March 1902 as a trainee clerk in the Criminal Affairs Department of the Ottoman Ministry of Justice. He was promoted to clerk on 13 January 1904 and graduated from the law school in 1908.

== Legal career ==
On 28 November 1909, Moshos was appointed assistant public prosecutor at the Istanbul Court of First Instance. He held this position until 5 May 1916, when he was transferred to the Üsküdar Court of First Instance as chief assistant public prosecutor.

On 25 June 1918, he was appointed assistant public prosecutor at the Istanbul Court of Appeal and was promoted to chief assistant on 24 April 1920. On 24 April 1920, he also became a member of the Beyoğlu Court of First Instance, where he served for approximately three years.

His public service ended following a decision of the Turkish Council of Ministers on 27 January 1923. After leaving government service, he began practising as an independent lawyer in Istanbul. He maintained an office at the İzmirlioğlu Han in the Galata district and mainly handled commercial disputes, enforcement proceedings, property matters and company agreements.

Moshos also served as a legal adviser to the Ecumenical Patriarchate of Constantinople.

== Political career ==
=== 1946 parliamentary election ===
Moshos joined the Democrat Party and entered electoral politics in the 1940s.

In the 1946 Turkish general election, held on 21 July 1946, he was included on the Democrat Party's Istanbul candidate list as a representative of the city's non-Muslim communities. Other candidates included Salamon Adato and Kirkor Keşişyan; Vasil Konos stood for the CHP. Moshos received 159,028 votes but was not elected.

=== Member of parliament (1950–1954) ===
In the 1950 Turkish general election, the Democrat Party nominated Moshos as a candidate for Istanbul alongside Andre Vahram Bayar and Salamon Adato.

He received 228,530 votes and was elected to the Grand National Assembly of Turkey. He obtained his electoral certificate on 17 May 1950 and joined parliament on 22 May 1950. His certificate was approved on 5 June 1950.

During the ninth parliamentary term, Moshos served on the Parliamentary Justice Committee, reflecting his professional background in law. He was elected to the committee on 6 November 1950. He participated in discussions concerning proposed amendments to the Turkish Penal Code, press legislation, amnesty measures, legislation concerning Masonic associations and other legal matters.

He also submitted a proposal concerning an amendment to Article 158 of the Turkish Penal Code, which was not accepted.

He also submitted a bill on the National Development Law (Milletçe Kalkınma Kanunu).

Moshos took part in parliamentary visits to communities in Istanbul and its surrounding areas. On 26 August 1951, he joined a delegation of Democrat Party representatives visiting villages in the Yalova area to hear residents' concerns about land, schools, roads and agriculture. The delegation also examined infrastructure issues on the Princes' Islands, including water supply, sanitation and public facilities.

On 8 October 1953, he participated in a parliamentary delegation headed by Ahmet Hamdi Başar that met workers' representatives to discuss employment conditions, minimum wages, old-age insurance and overtime payments.

His parliamentary mandate ended in 1954, and he did not serve in subsequent parliamentary terms.

== Later activities ==
After leaving parliament, Moshos resumed his private legal practice but maintained contacts with the Democrat Party and its political leadership.

On 1 September 1955, he requested a meeting with Prime Minister Adnan Menderes to present a proposal for a US$300 million credit from the United States, according to a document preserved in the Turkish Republican Archives.

During the Cyprus conflict, particularly as intercommunal violence increased in the late 1950s, Moshos participated in a humanitarian assistance initiative supporting Turkish Cypriots.

In 1958, he became a member of the Social Assistance Committee for Turkish Cyprus (Türk Kıbrıs'a Sosyal Yardım Organizasyon Komitesi), established by the Istanbul Hemşehriler Association. The committee also included Papa Eftim, the spiritual leader of the Turkish Orthodox Church.

== Personal life ==
Moshos was married to Anna (born 1891), with whom he had two daughters, Klio (born 1918) and Zoi (born 1928).

According to his parliamentary biographical records, he spoke Greek, Arabic, Persian and French.

== Death ==
Ahilya Moshos died in Istanbul on 13 December 1966. He was buried at the Şişli Greek Orthodox Cemetery in Istanbul.

== See also ==
- Greek Orthodox Church of Constantinople
- Democrat Party (Turkey, 1946–1960)
- Grand National Assembly of Turkey
