= Büyükdere, Sarıyer =

Büyükdere
- Neighbourhood
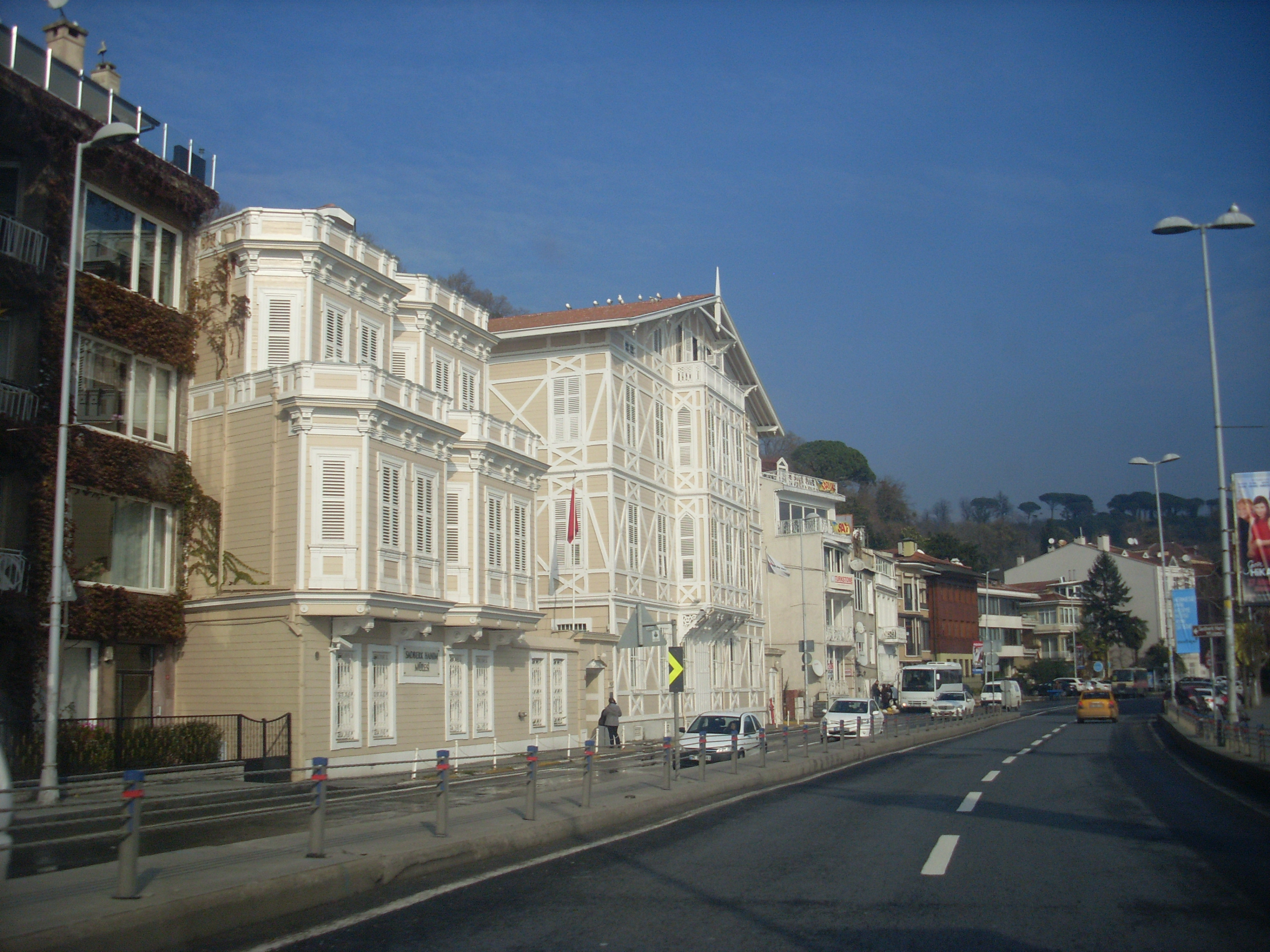
- Sadberk Hanım Museum in Büyükdere

- Location within Turkey Location within Istanbul
- Coordinates: 41°09′49″N 29°02′32″E
- Country: Turkey
- Province: Istanbul
- District: Sarıyer
- Population (2022): 8,586
- Time zone: UTC+3 (TRT)
- Postal code: 34453
- Area code: 0212

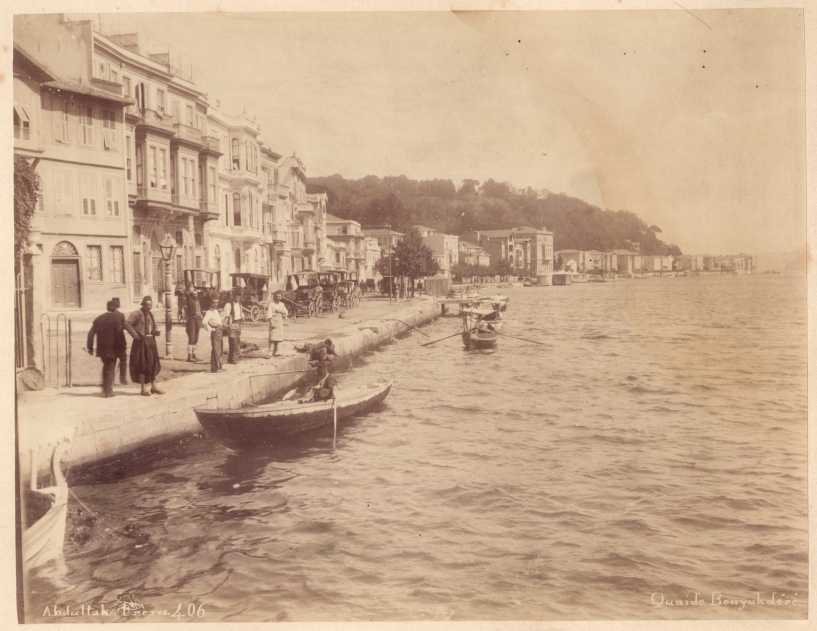
Büyükdere quay photographed by Abdullah Brothers (Abdullah Freres) in 1895

Büyükdere is a neighbourhood in the municipality and district of Sarıyer, Istanbul Province, Turkey. Its population is 8,586 (2022). It is situated on the European shore of the Bosphorus strait about 2 km (1.2 mi) southwest of Sarıyer. Its name means 'big stream' in Turkish, in reference to the river that used to flow into the Bosphorus here.

A 14-kilometre-long (8.7 mi) major road, Büyükdere Avenue, starts south of Büyükdere, and runs inland as far as Şişli.

In the 19th century Büyükdere, like neighbouring Tarabya, was a popular summer retreat for members of Istanbul's foreign and diplomatic community and it still has several churches and embassy buildings dating back to that period. There was then a Büyükdere ferry terminal but although it has been restored it has not been put back into use (partly because of the road that was built in front of it on reclaimed land), meaning that most access to the neighbourhood is by bus along the coast road.

== Places of interest ==
The Sadberk Hanım Museum, a private archaeology and ethnography museum, is housed in what started life in Ottoman times as the wooden Azaryan (Vidalı) Yalısı or waterside mansion belonging to an Armenian member of parliament. The wealthy Koç family bought it as a home in the 1950s but in 1980 turned it into a private museum to house the collections of Turkish businessman Vehbi Koç's wife, Sadberk Hanım However, it is scheduled to open at a new site on the banks of the Golden Horn in 2023 as part of the Haliçport project. Nearby is a second museum building that houses the carpet and kilim collection of American explorer Josephine Powell.

Büyükdere is home to a Greek Orthodox church (Ayia Paraskevi Church, 1831), a Latin Catholic Italian church (Santa Maria, 1866), an Armenian Catholic church (Surp Boğos, 1885), and an Armenian Apostolic church (Surp Hıripsimyants, 1886). The Kara Kethüda Mosque dates from the 18th century.

The Spanish Summer Embassy building was originally built by Franciscan friars in grand Neoclassical style and then donated to the Spanish government in 1783 so that embassy staff would have somewhere to escape the intense heat of an Istanbul summer. Another building is the Russian Summer Embassy which started life as a home for Count Nikolay Ignatyev in 1840.

Overlooking the coast road the 18th-century yalı once owned by Keçecizade Fuat Paşa, grand vizier to Sultan Abdülaziz, is now a hotel.

== Educational and State Institutions ==
There is a local primary school (Mehmet İpkin İlköğretim Okulu) here as well as a vocational high school for girls (Sarıyer Kız Teknik ve Meslek Lisesi). Sarıyer district municipality's income tax and fire departments are also based in Büyükdere.

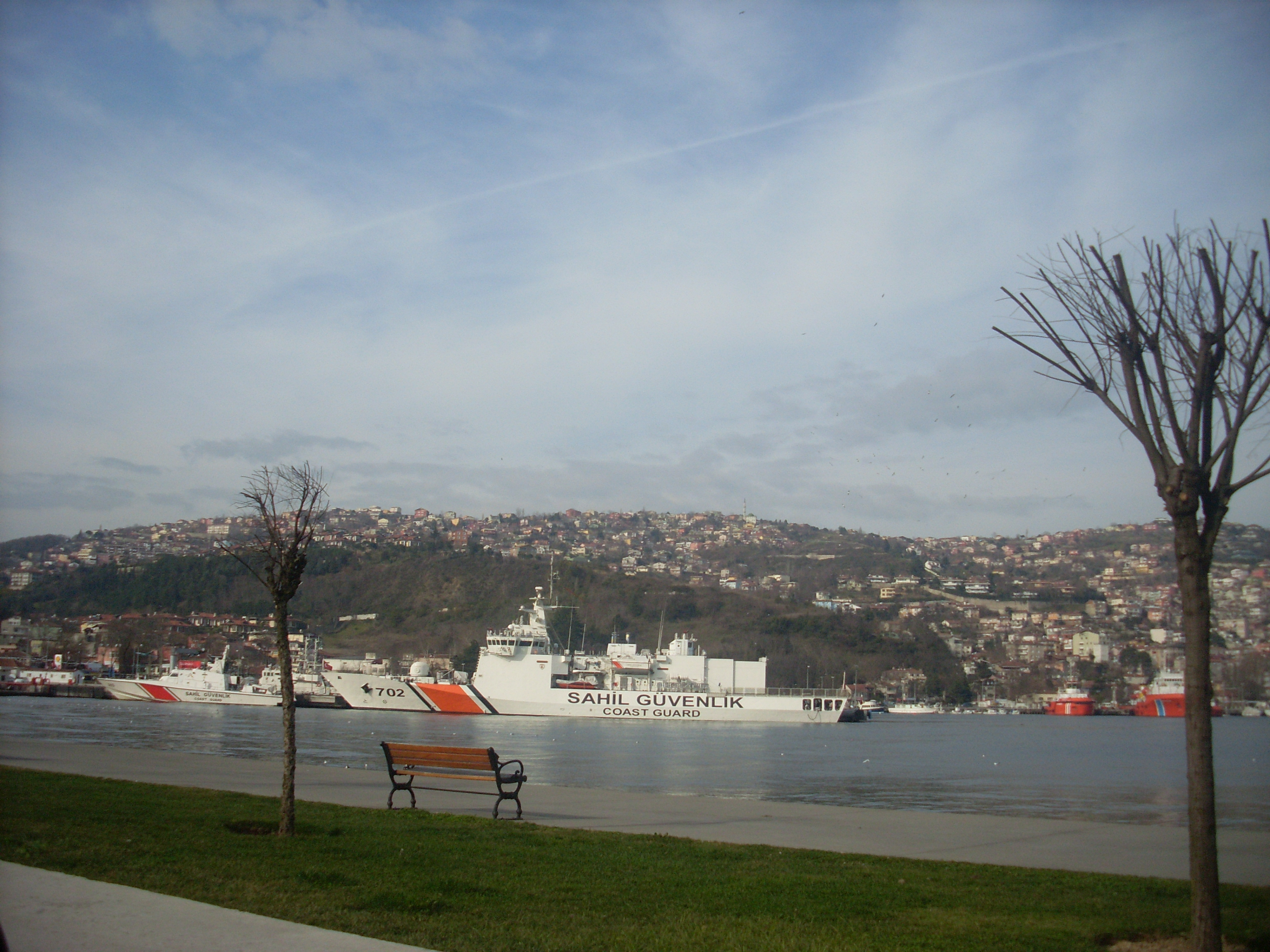
Coast Guard vessels docking in front of Büyükdere

The Regional Command of the Turkish Coast Guard for the Marmara Sea and the Turkish Straits is based at Büyükdere on a 2.1-hectare (5.2-acre) property. Its headquarters is housed in a hunting lodge built for Mehmed VI, the last sultan of the Ottoman Empire. Some vessels of the Coast Guard are docked at Büyükdere Pier.

== Religious buildings ==
The quarter is home to following historic religious buildings:

- Büyükdere Kara Mehmet Kethüda Mosque, 18-th century Sunni Islam mosque,
- Agia Paraskevi Church, Büyükdere, 1830-built Greek Orthodox church,
- Surp Bogos Church, 1847-built Armenian Catholic church,
- Büyükdere Surp Hripsimyants Church, 1848-built Armenian Apostolic church,
- Church of Santa Maria, Istanbul, 1866-built Roman Catholic church.

== Notable residents ==
- Hayreddin Barbarossa, 16th Century Pirate
- Anastasia Georgiadou (1891–1939), Greek singer, best known as 'Deniz Kızı Eftalya' ('Efthalia the Mermaid').
- Count Nikolay Ignatyev, Russian ambassador 1864–77
- Keçecizade Fuat Paşa, 19th-century grand vizier
- Vehbi Koç and his wife Sadberk Hanım
