= Konstantinos Koumas =

Greek scholar (1777–1836)

Konstantinos Koumas (Greek: Κωνσταντίνος Κούμας; Larissa, 26 September 1777 – Trieste, 13 May 1836) was a Greek 'Teacher of the Nation', a pioneer of the Modern Greek Enlightenment, a historian, philosopher and translator of literary works.

== Biography ==
=== Childhood and studies ===
He was born in Larissa in 1777. His father was Michael Koumas, a fury merchant.

From the fear of not being taken by the Janissaries, he spent his childhood hidden at home, without ever attending school or church. In 1787, because of the plague epidemic that broke out in Larissa, the family of Koumas left in Tyrnavos. There, little Konstantinos learned how to read the synaxaries at church and the Salvation of Sinners by Landos (Αμαρτωλών Σωτηρία του Λάνδου). Because he developed an enthusiasm for knowledge, his parents delivered him at fifteen at the school of Tyrnavos, where he had Ioannis Pezaros (Ιωάννης Πέζαρος) as his teacher. He was educated by him for six years and he got the reputation of a prominent student. He was taught of Ancient Greek classical writers and basic principles of philosophy jointly with mathematics, geometry and physics, in which he showed special inclination. Metropolitan of Larissa, Dionysis Kaliarchis took him with him to Constantinople and introduced him to the Grand Dragoman of the Sublime Porte, Constantine Ypsilantis. When Constantine was declared Prince of Wallachia, he suggested hiring him at his services, but Koumas refused and returned to his homeland, where he became a teacher.

=== Teacher at Tsaritsani and Ampelakia ===
Because of the constant terrorism of the Turkish, he fled to Tsaritsani where he taught and preached from a pulpit. He taught Greek and scientific studies in simple Greek language by the standards of the democrats and he introduced algebra as a new lesson. In October 1798, he married the daughter of his teacher, Ioannis Pezaros.

He then went to Ampelakia, where Gregory Konstantas and the doctor Spyridon Asanis from Kefallonia used to teach. In 1799, Koumas had a daughter but he lost his wife. Deeply saddened, he fled to the Vineyards, where he occupied with Asanis in translating the work of a French astronomer and mathematician Abbe de la Caille, about conical prefectures.

=== In Vienna ===
At the end of 1803, Anthimos Gazis took him along when he visited at summer, his birthplace. And Koumas wanted passionately to meet “the Enlightened Europe”. At the capital of Austria-Hungary, where he was the chaplain of a prosperous Greek community, he was included in his staff for the publication of his Greek dictionary. Also, Koumas was appointed as a private teacher to the wealthy merchant Stephanos Moschos (Στέφανος Μόσχος), while at the same time, he applied to the University of Vienna, mainly attending math-related courses. With the still intense echo of the French Revolution, Vienna at the time was full of liberty and new ideas, it was a center of a spiritual and artistic movement, already having a university since 1365, while books, newspapers and magazines were being distributed in several languages. He himself is learning German. 1807 was a rough year for Koumas, finding him in a formidable financial situation, after his father's death.

=== In Smyrna ===
In 1808 he received an invitation from the Greeks of Smyrna to take over the management of the newly established Philological Gymnasium of Smyrna. At the urging of Adamantios Korais, who appreciated him for his abilities, he accepted and went there. In this position, he taught mathematics, philosophy, experimental physics, geography and ethics, while he organized physical and chemical experiments by equipping the school with the corresponding instruments. With his teaching he introduced rationalism and experimentation, displacing the ecclesiastical tradition of teaching based on memorization and obedience. He gained a great reputation as a worthy organizer of schools, and the Patriarch Cyril VII invited him to Constantinople to run the Great School of the Nation. In 1814 he accepted the post of director of the Kourotsesmeio school in Xirokrini (north of Constantinople), where he remained for only one year and returned to Smyrna, where in 1815 his daughter was getting married.

=== Stance towards the Filiki Etaireia ===
Koumas was forced to become a member of the Filiki Etaireia, but he was skeptical, if not negative, about the Revolution and the Friends. In his work "Stories of human actions ..." (1832) he describes many friends as moneylenders, who catechized new members because they paid a florin for each new member. He criticizes the Friends because they predicted the certain fall of the Ottoman Empire. He described Alexandros Ypsilantis as "naive and childish". However, this negative attitude towards the Friendly Society was widespread among scholars before the Revolution.

=== In Germany ===
In October 1817 the Greek scholar went to Vienna to publish books and to enrich his knowledge. He travels to German universities and meets great contemporary scholars, such as Wolf, Krug, Delling, Kreuzer. He admires the rational spirit of Immanuel Kant. Leipzig University awarded him a doctorate in Philosophy and Fine Arts, sending him the corresponding diploma in early 1820, while the Royal Academy of Berlin and the Ludwig-Maximilians-Universität München, recognized him as an honorary member. After this two-year wandering, which was particularly useful for his intellectual training, he will return to Smyrna, having in his armory a rich translation and publishing work.

=== Return to Smyrna ===
The school of Smyrna, however, in 1819 was closed and Koymas refused the proposal for the management of the Evangelical School. During his stay there, he dealt with the translation of a Greco-German dictionary (some "Reimeros"), considering German as the language of devotion to science and rationalism. This work was forced to stop with the declaration of the Greek Revolution. His entire property, including his remarkable library, is confiscated by the Turkish who consider him suspicious.

=== Greek Revolution and escape to Austria ===
He escapes on an Austrian ship to Trieste. From there he will go to Vienna where he is arrested by the Austrian police of Metternich on charges of participating in a conspiracy, but is quickly released on restrictive terms. In Vienna he completes the compilation of his dictionary - his only work that he managed to save - and then he will proceed to his publication, while immediately afterwards he will deal with the writing of the History of Human Acts from ancient times until 1831. This work, which he published in the same year in 12 volumes, is his most important intellectual creation. In the period up to 1836, Koumas refused twice to assume duties related to educational activities in Greece due to his fragile health. During his last years, he spent in Tergeste/Trieste where he died in 1836 of cholera at the age of 59. His stance on the language issue/His attitude towards language issue Koumas remained over time "the most loyal and consistent follower of Korais", an opponent of the archaic word/ancient Greek language, whom he considers as a brake on the enlightenment effort for the progress of Greek-speaking education. Koumas believed in the social character of education and considered that teaching in a more familiar language contributes decisively to the achievement of this goal. For these reasons, he came into conflict with representatives of the archaic language/ ancient Greek language such as Neophytos Doukas.

== Pension ==
From there they arrived after six days of horse riding in the panspermon of Adria in the city of Trieste. In it, I met the most knowledgeable, hard-working, for the sake of our generation and respected man from Thessalia, Koyma. It happened there by chance, while I was coming down to Greece after the son of Sophocles and the wise Economos during that (April-day) (1834) of my stay in Trieste. The well-educated Koymas was then writing the general geography and, as usual, he was working thoroughly from morning. Until the fourth hour of the afternoon and, meaning, he went out regularly for a walk. When we did not meet him, he expressed his desire to watch him as long as he wanted to stay in Trieste, because he had some relationship with none other than the expatriates in that city. On the first Sunday of my stay in Trieste, I attended the venerable Koyma in the Greek Orthodox Church, which was also attended by the wise Economos.

- Panagiotis Papanaoum, Autobiography, 1873.

== His work ==
The list of his works is presented in his book Polychronis Enepekidis, Korais-Koymas-Kalvos, Athens 1967, pp. 165–166.

- Elementary series of mathematical and physical treatises, volumes 8, Vienna 1807.
- Chemistry summary, volumes 2, Vienna 1808.
- Synopsis of Physics, Vienna 1812.
- Dissertation in the category of one of the Duke of Argos ", Hermes the Wise, 18, (1813).
- Veilandou Agathon, volumes 3, Vienna 1814.
- Historical chronology, Vienna 1818.
- Synopsis of the History of Philosophy, Vienna 1818.
- Constitution of Philosophy, volumes 4, Vienna 1818-1820.
- "Pedagogy. On education and schools ", Hermes the Wise (1819)
- Summary of Sciences for the pioneers containing Arithmetic, Geometry, New Geography, Astronomy, Logic and Ethics, Vienna 1819.
- Summary of Old Geography, Vienna 1819.
- Dictionary for them studying the ancient Greek books, according to Reimeros's Greek-German, volumes 2, Vienna 1826.
- History of human deeds from ancient times to the present day, volumes 12, Vienna 1830–1832.
- Grammar for schools, Vienna 1833.
- Geography, volumes 5, Vienna 1838–1840.
- The two Apologies to the Great Church of the eloquent K. Economos and other letters of his unpublished, Ermoupolis Psyros 1861.

== Sources ==
Μεγάλοι διδάσκαλοι του γένους - Ημερολόγιον Εγκυκλοπαιδικόν. 1913. σελίδες 99–101. Ανακτήθηκε στις 30 Ιουλίου 2011

== Bibliography ==
- Roxani D. Argyropoulou, "K. M. Koumas as a Philosopher" selected from the publication of the Research Center of Greek Philosophy of the Academy of Athens (Series B: Reprints), W. G. Tennemann, Synopsis of the History of Philosophy, translated by K. M. Koumas, Athens 1973, 225-243 Approaches to Modern Greek Philosophy, Thessaloniki, Vanias, 2004, 78-100.
- Roxani D. Argyropoulou, "Language and Reality in K. Koumas", Hellenic Philosophical Society, Proceedings of the Symposium Language and Reality in Greek Philosophy, Athens, 1985, 270-274 Approaches to Modern Greek Philosophy, Thessaloniki, Vanias, 2004, 101-107.
- Roxani D. Argyropoulou, "The Ethics of K. M. Koumas and the System of Practical Philosophy of W. T. Krug", Philosophy 7 (1977), 224- 230 Modern Greek Moral and Political Thought. From Enlightenment to Romanticism, Thessaloniki, Vanias, 2003, 152-170.
- Roxani D. Argyropoulou, "The Model of Agathon in the Intellect of K. M. Koumas”, Philosophy 23-24 (1993-1994), 455-467 Modern Greek moral and political thought. From Enlightenment to Romanticism, Thessaloniki, Vanias, 2003, 171-180.
- Roxani D. Argyropoulou, "Freedom in the search for virtue according to K. M. Koumas" in the collective volume R. Argyropoulou-A. Koukis-K. Petsios-A. Kelesidou-A. Glykofrydis-Leontsini, The concept of freedom in Modern Greek Thought, preface E. Moutsopoulos, second half-volume, nineteenth century, Academy of Athens, Research Center for Greek Philosophy, Athens 1997, 11-31.
- Roxani D. Argyropoulou, “The course of piety from K. M. Koumas to Th. Kairis”, Center for Modern Greek Research, Hellenic University of Athens, Proceedings of the Panhellenic Symposium Theophilos Kairis, Athens, 207-210 Modern Greek moral and political thought. From the Enlightenment to Romanticism, Thessaloniki, Vanias, 2003, 190-196.
- Psimmenos Nikos, “Physics and mathematics in the view of K. M. Koumas”. In: Proceedings of the conference "The natural sciences in Greece and especially in Thessaloniki before the Revolution" (Larissa - Ampelakia - Tyrnavos 22–23.3.1985), Larissa 1986, 72–79
- Psimmenos Nikos, "Constantinos Koumas as a historian of modern Greek philosophy", Philosophy 15-16 (1985–86), 376–397.
- Zeginis, Ioannis: "Constantinos Koumas, a teacher of the nation". Parnassos 22 (1980), 227–231.
- Karas, G.: Theophilos Kairis, Konstantinos M. Koumas. Two pioneering teachers of the nation, Ath. 1977.
- Tsirikoglou-Lagouda, Fotini: The Thessalian scholar-educator of the modern Greek enlightenment, Konstantinos M. Koumas. His life, his work, his ideas. "Kyriakides Brothers", Thessaloniki 1997.
