= Agia Paraskevi Church, Büyükdere =

Church building in İstanbul, Turkey

- Greek: Εκκλησία της Αγίας Παρασκευής; Turkish: Büyükdere Aya Paraşkevi Rum Ortodoks Kilisesi
- Location of the church in Istanbul

Religion
- Affiliation: Greek Orthodox Church
- District: Büyükdere, Sarıyer
- Province: Istanbul
- Ownership: Büyükdere Aya Paraskevi Church Foundation
- Year consecrated: 1830; 196 years ago
- Status: active

Location
- Country: Turkey
- Coordinates: 41.16167°N 29.04528°E

Architecture
- Completed: 1830; 196 years ago

Agia Paraskevi Church (Greek: Εκκλησία της Αγίας Παρασκευής), (Turkish: Büyükdere Aya Paraşkevi Rum Ortodoks Kilisesi) is a Greek Orthodox church in Büyükdere, Sarıyer in northern Istanbul, Turkey.

== History ==
Located in the Büyükdere quarter of Sarıyer district in Istanbul, Turkey, the church's existence dates back to the early 17th century. Today's masonry structure was buil in 1830t on the place of the wooden building, which was destroyed by a fire. The church's property belongs to Büyükdere Aya Paraskevi Church Foundation.

== Architecture ==
The church building is situated in a paved courtyard surrounded by a high wall. The courtyard has two gates opening to different streets. Inside the courtyard, there are a clergy house, administrative buildings and a cemetery with trees in addition to the church building. A holy well (hagiasma) at a depth of depth 1.93 m (6 ft 4 in) and a deep well with metallic cover are also found in the courtyard.

There is no inscription with the date of church's construction. However, the date "1830" is situated under the depiction in the small niche inside the narthex During restoration works in December 2013, the date "1830" with a cross was discovered on a façade stone under the eaves. There is no information about the architect of the building.

The church has a basilica-plane in rectangular form in the east–west direction. It consists of narthex, naos, gallery, bema and apsis. A half-round apse protrudes on the axis. The entrance of the building used today is on the south side. The naos has the dimension 19.85 m × 9.65 m (65.1 ft × 31.7 ft).

The building is constructed from ashlar and brick. The walls are 89 cm (35 in) thick except the eastern wall, which has a thickness of 95 cm (37 in). The brick walls of the narthex is in average 40 m (130 ft) thick. . Every part of the western façade except the narthex at the lower level is plastered and painted, and the facade of the narthex is covered with brick. The north and south façades have three arched windows and a horizontal window each. A wooden door is on the narthex walls.

The narthexfloor is paved with 20 cm × 20 cm (7.9 in × 7.9 in)-sized tiles of plant motifs. The floor of the naos is marble and it is at the level of the middle nave. The gallery floor is constructed with 18 cm (7.1 in) wide wooden parquet.
