= Büyükdere Kara Mehmet Kethüda Mosque =

Mosque in Büyükdere, Sarıyer, Istanbul, Turkey

Kara Mehmet Kethüda Mosque
- Location in the Istanbul

Religion
- Affiliation: Sunni Islam

Location
- Location: Istanbul, Turkey
- Coordinates: 41.16038°N 29.04306°E

Architecture
- Type: Mosque
- Completed: 18th century

Specifications
- Minaret: 1
- Materials: Masonry, wood (roof)

Kara Mehmet Kethüda Mosque (Turkish: Kara Mehmet Kethüda Cami), also known as Kara Kethüda Mosque, is an 18th-century Sunni Islam mosque at Büyükdere, Sarıyer in Istanbul, Turkey.

== History ==
Located in the Büyükdere quarter of Sarıyer district in Istanbul, Turkey, the mosque was built by the Ottoman court steward Mehmet Agha, nicknamed "Kara Mehmet" (the "Black Mehmet"), during the reign of Sultan Mustafa III (r. 1757–1774) according to an inscription. The mosque building was used as a public school for a time period after the introduction of the modern Turkish alphabet in 1929. The mosque is owned by the Kara Kethüda Mehmet Ağa Foundation.

== Architecture ==
The two-storey mosque building is constructed in masonry with a wooden roof and has a concrete mihrab and narthex. The most striking part of the mosque is the ashlar minaret decorated with zigzag motifs on its body. The building underwent various changes due numerous restorations. A fenced cemetery and a toilet building are situated in the courtyard.
