= Yorgo Bacanos =

Yorgo Bacanos Γιώργος Μπατζανός
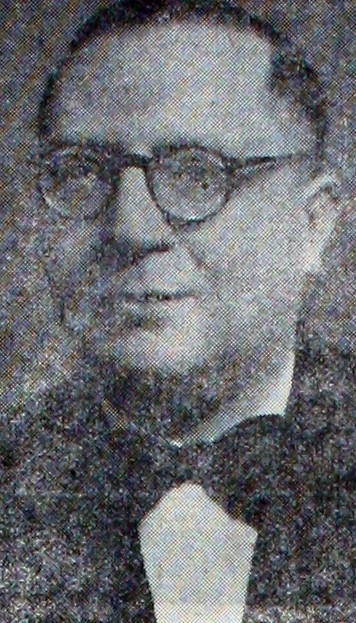

Background information
- Born: September 21, 1900; Silivri, Constantinople, Ottoman Empire
- Died: February 24, 1977 (aged 76) Istanbul, Turkey
- Genres: Turkish classical music
- Instrument: Oud
- Years active: 1915-1977
- Formerly of: Aleko Bacanos, Sadettin Kaynak, Deniz Kızı Eftalya

Yorgo Bacanos (Greek: Γιώργος Μπατζανός, pronounced [ʝeˈor. ɣos ba.d͡zaˈnos]; 21 September 1900 - 24 February 1977) was a master oud player and improvisational composer of Ottoman classical music. His father Haralambos (known as Lavtacı Lambo in Turkish) was of Greek Romani descent, and a legendary lavta and oud improviser. His brother Aleko Bacanos, his uncle Anastasios Leontaridis, his cousins Paraschos and Lambros Leontaridis and his grandfather Leondi Efendi were well-known kemençe players, and his grandfather Ligori Efendi played the kanun. His father was largely responsible for introducing the young Yorgo to music, presenting him with his first oud at the age of five. Yorgo attended the prestigious Lycée Saint Benoît in Istanbul, but soon left to concentrate on music full-time. He had made his first public appearance in the Eftalofos Club in Taksim at the age of twelve.

After his debut, he travelled to Cyprus and Egypt to perform, and upon his return to Turkey his fame grew quickly. He started performing on Turkish Radio in 1927, and went on continued to perform there for 51 years, until his death. In 1928, he visited Berlin with his brother Aleko, and Kanuni Ahmet Yatman and performed in records of Hafiz Kemal and Hafiz Sadettin Kaynak; in the next year, he performed in Paris, with the violinist Sadi Işılay, and Deniz Kızı Eftalya; he further went on to Cairo with the same band.

He played with the other masters of his era, including Münir Nurettin Selçuk and Zeki Müren in Turkey, and Umm Kulthum and Munir Bashir in the Arab world. Yorgo Bacanos also gave concerts in many European countries, and became one of the finest and most renowned oud players of his time (alongside Udi Hrant Kenkulian). His technique and musicality proved influential, and his distinctive variations are still being performed at present.
