= Surp Bogos Church =

Armenian church in Istanbul, Turkey

- Armenian: Սուրբ Պօղոս Եկեղեցի; Turkish: Surp Boğos Kilisesi
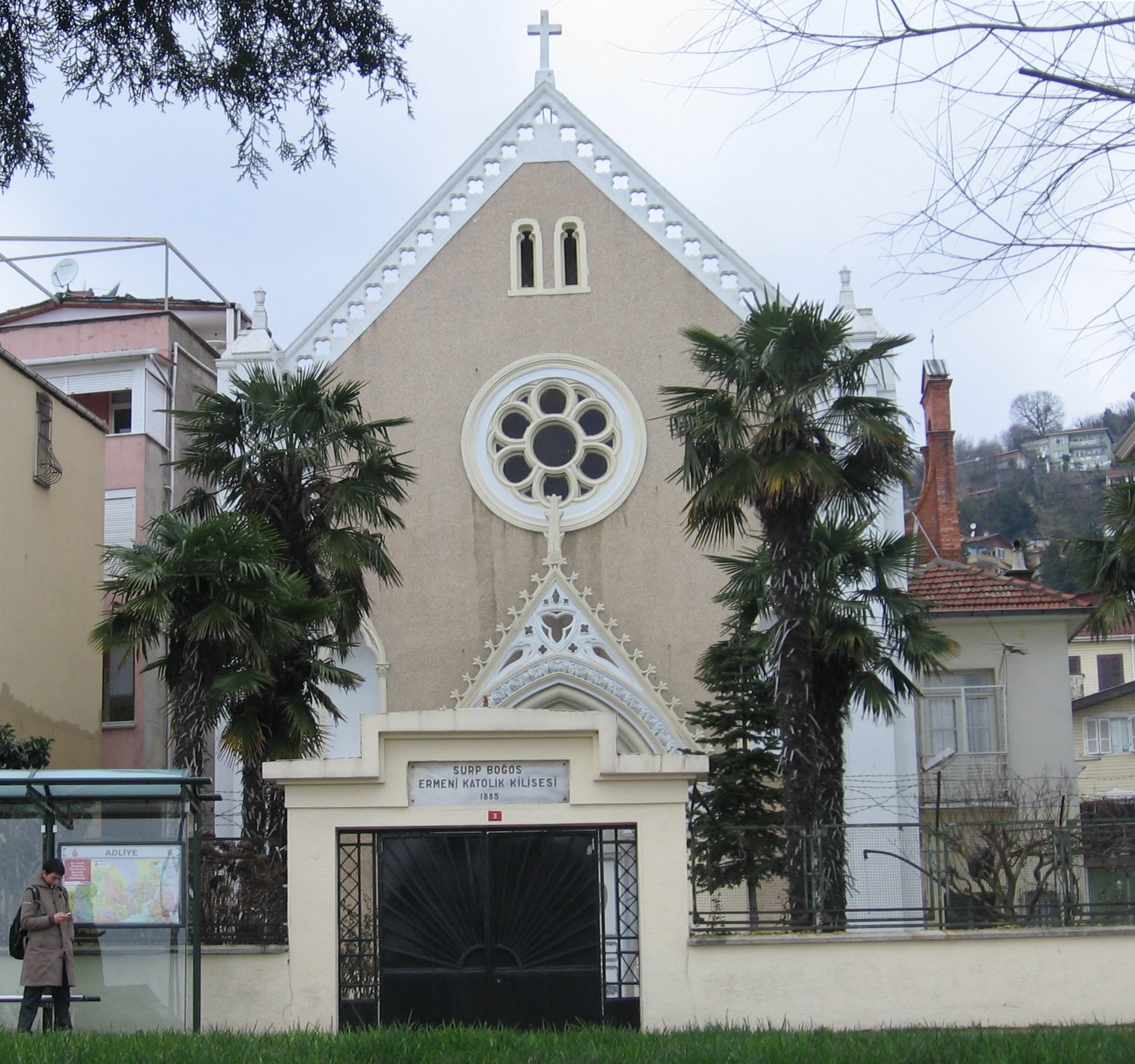
- Surp Bogos Church in Büyükdere, Sarıyer, Istanbul

- Location of the church in Istanbul

Religion
- Affiliation: Armenian Catholic Church
- District: Büyükdere, Sarıyer
- Province: Istanbul
- Rite: Armenian Rite
- Ecclesiastical or organizational status: active
- Ownership: Armenian Catholic Archeparchy of Istanbul
- Leadership: Hayr Vartan Kazancıyan
- Patron: Saint Paul
- Year consecrated: 1885; 141 years ago

Location
- Location: Büyükdere
- Municipality: Sarıyer
- Country: Turkey
- Interactive map of Surp Bogos Church
- Coordinates: 41.16250°N 29.04695°E

Architecture
- Creator: Boğos Amira Bilezikciyan
- Established: 1847
- Groundbreaking: 1859
- Completed: 1882; 144 years ago

Surp Bogos Church (Armenian: Սուրբ Պօղոս Եկեղեցի), (Turkish: Surp Boğos Kilisesi) is an Armenian Catholic church in Büyükdere, Sarıyer, northern Istanbul, Turkey. It was established as a wooden church in 1847, rebuilt in masonry in 1882, and consecrated in 1885.

== History ==
Located in the Büyükdere quarter of Sarıyer district in Istanbul, Turkey, a wooden church was built in 1847 on the property of the Ottoman Mint manager Boğos Amira Bilezikciyan after his death. The church was named "Surp Bogos" after the donor in allusion to Saint Paul in Armenian language. Upon his will, the church building was transferred to the Armenian Catholic Archeparchy of Constantinople. In 1859, as the small church could not meet the needs of thelocal Armenian community, the church foundation purchased the neighboring property, and started the construction of a new building. The Azaryan family made contributions to the church. In 1882, a masonry church building, a clergy house, a school builfing and four wooden houses were was built on the place of the demolished wooden church. The new church was consecrated in 1885.

== Staff of office ==
The church is administered by Hayr Vartan Kazancıyan (abbot), Derayr Haygaram Çekiç, Der Hagop Minasyan (lead deacon), and Gisasargavak Jan Acemoğlu (deacon).
