= Eftalya Işılay =

Turkish singer of Greek descent (1891–1939)

- Also known as: Deniz Kızı Eftalya (Efthalia the Mermaid)
- Born: Anastasia Georgiadou (Greek: Ἀναστασία Γεωργιάδου); 1891; Büyükdere, Constantinople, Ottoman Empire
- Died: 15 March 1939 (aged 47–48) Istanbul, Turkey
- Genres: Ottoman classical, Turkish folk
- Occupation: Singer
- Years active: 1911–1936
- Labels: Pathé Records, Columbia Records, His Master's Voice

Eftalya Işılay (1891 – 15 March 1939), née Anastasia Georgiadou (Greek: Ἀναστασία Γεωργιάδου), best known as Deniz Kızı Eftalya (Turkish for "Efthalia the Mermaid"), was an Ottoman and later Turkish singer of Greek ethnicity.

== Early years ==
Anastasia Georgiadou was born Ottoman Greek in 1891 in the Büyükdere suburb of Istanbul, then Constantinople in the Ottoman Empire, present-day Turkey. Her father was a Captain of the Ottoman Gendarmerie.

At a very young age, she accompanied her instrument-playing father in singing at guest gatherings. Later, she sang to her father's music on a rowboat on Bosphorus off Büyükdere among 20-30 rowboats during full moon at summer nights. She sometimes sang alone in the sea at night. People at the seashore, listening to her singing, nicknamed her Deniz Kızı Eftalya ("Efthalia the Mermaid") from the age of five or six.

== Professional career ==
She sang cantos and folk songs on stage at the music-performance coffee houses in Galata quarter. Her music career changed after her marriage to Sadi (later Işılay), a notable violinist. She performed together with her husband. Between 1923 and 1926, she recorded her songs for Pathé Records in Paris, France, where she lived with her husband. During this time, she gave concerts in Europe and the Middle East. She was the first non-Muslim singer, who recorded 56 songs of about one hundred works compiled from Anatolia for Columbia Records, on behalf of the Dâr-ül Elhan ("House of Melodies"), today Istanbul University State Conservatory. To avoid ethnic tensions, she used Turkish pseudonyms instead of her original name on the first 30 or so records she made. The number of her records after 1927 neared 50. After her songs were acclaimed at performances before President Mustafa Kemal Atatürk (r. 1923–1938), from 1930 on she did not avoid using her name. She used the name "Deniz Kızı Eftalya" on most of her records except for eleven of them. In 1934, she recorded for the label His Master's Voice under the name "Eftalya Sadi", using her husband's given name as her family name, just before the surname law took effect in Turkey.

She was associated with Greek-Turkish master musicians and composers, oud player Yorgo Bacanos (1900–1977) and his brother, kemenche, and oud virtuoso Aleko Bacanos (1888–1950). She was so popular under the nickname "Deniz Kızı Eftalya" that Aleko Bacanos dedicated to her a composition titled Gel Ey Denizin Nazlı Kızı Nûş-i Şarâb Et ("Come on, coy mermaid, drink wine") in the Acem-Aşiran melody type. The song became so famous that its cover versions were performed by the Modern Folk Trio and other notable artists several decades later.

== Retirement and death ==
Eftalya's artistic life of almost 25 years ended with the jubilee night, organized on 4 August 1936 by the "Şirket-i Hayriye" (today Istanbul City Ferry Line) during a full moon night. Four passenger ferries were decorated, and a stage was constructed on a raft. The ferries sailed from Bebek on the Bosphorus northwards up to Büyükdere, stopping by piers on both sides of the strait. People gathered ashore joined the event with paper lanterns. The program featured also zeibekiko dances, whose music Eftalya enjoyed.

She fell ill during the jubilee event, and died in Istanbul on 15 March 1939. She was interred at Şişli Greek Orthodox Cemetery following the religious funeral service at the Hagia Triada Church.

== Discography ==
- Denizkızı Eftalya – Kadıköylü (CD) (in Turkish). Kalan Müzik. 4 May 1998. Archived from the original on 8 August 2020. 22 tracks of Ottoman classical and Turkish folk music.

== Bibliography ==
- Bozis, Sula (2011). İstanbullu Rumlar [Greeks of Istanbul] (in Turkish). Istanbul Bilgi University. ISBN 978-605-3992-301.
- Ermert, Esra; Tülin Tankut; Zehra Toska; Hülya İskender-Hayatseven (December 2007). 2008 İstanbul Temaşa Hayatında Kadınlar [Women in the Event Life of Istanbul] (PDF) (in Turkish). Kadın Eserleri Kütüphanesi ve Bilgi Merkezi Vakfı - Han Matbaacılık.
- Deniz Kızı Eftelya - Kadıköylü (CD, booklet) (1st ed.). Kalan Müzik. 1988. ISBN 978-183-400-224-8.
