= Büyükdere Surp Hripsimyants Church =

Religious building in Turkey

Surp Hripsimyants Church
- Armenian: Սուրբ Հռիփսիմեանց Եկեղեցի; Turkish: Büyükdere Surp Hripsimyants Kilisesi
- Location of the church in Istanbul

Religion
- Affiliation: Armenian Apostolic Church
- District: Büyükdere, Sarıyer
- Province: Istanbul
- Region: 2nd (Old Istanbul)
- Rite: Armenian Rite
- Ownership: Armenian Patriarchate of Constantinople
- Year consecrated: 1848; 178 years ago
- Status: active

Location
- Country: Turkey
- Coordinates: 41.15945°N 29.03976°E

Architecture
- Architects: Kevork and Garabed Karakehya brothers
- Completed: 1848; 178 years ago
- Construction cost: 15,000 silver kuruş (150 gold lira)

Büyükdere Surp Hripsimyants Church, also known as Saint Hripsimians Church, (Armenian: Սուրբ Հռիփսիմեանց Եկեղեցի), (Turkish: Büyükdere Surp Hripsimyants Kilisesi), is an Armenian Apostolic church located in Büyükdere, Sarıyer in Istanbul, Turkey.

== History ==
Located in the Büyükdere quarter of Sarıyer district in northern Istanbul, the church was built by Kevork and Garabed Karakehya brothers, and consecrated in 1848. In 1886 the church building was rebuilt in masonry to a cost of 15,000 silver kuruş (150 gold lira).

The 1894 Istanbul earthquake damaged the church. In 1927, the building was repaired through Apraham Pasha Yeramyan, and a bell tower was added. The church was repaired again in different times. Reopening of the church after the last repair works took place in February 2022.
