= Phanar Greek Orthodox College =

Phanar Greek Orthodox College (Great School of the Nation)
- Μεγάλη του Γένους Σχολή
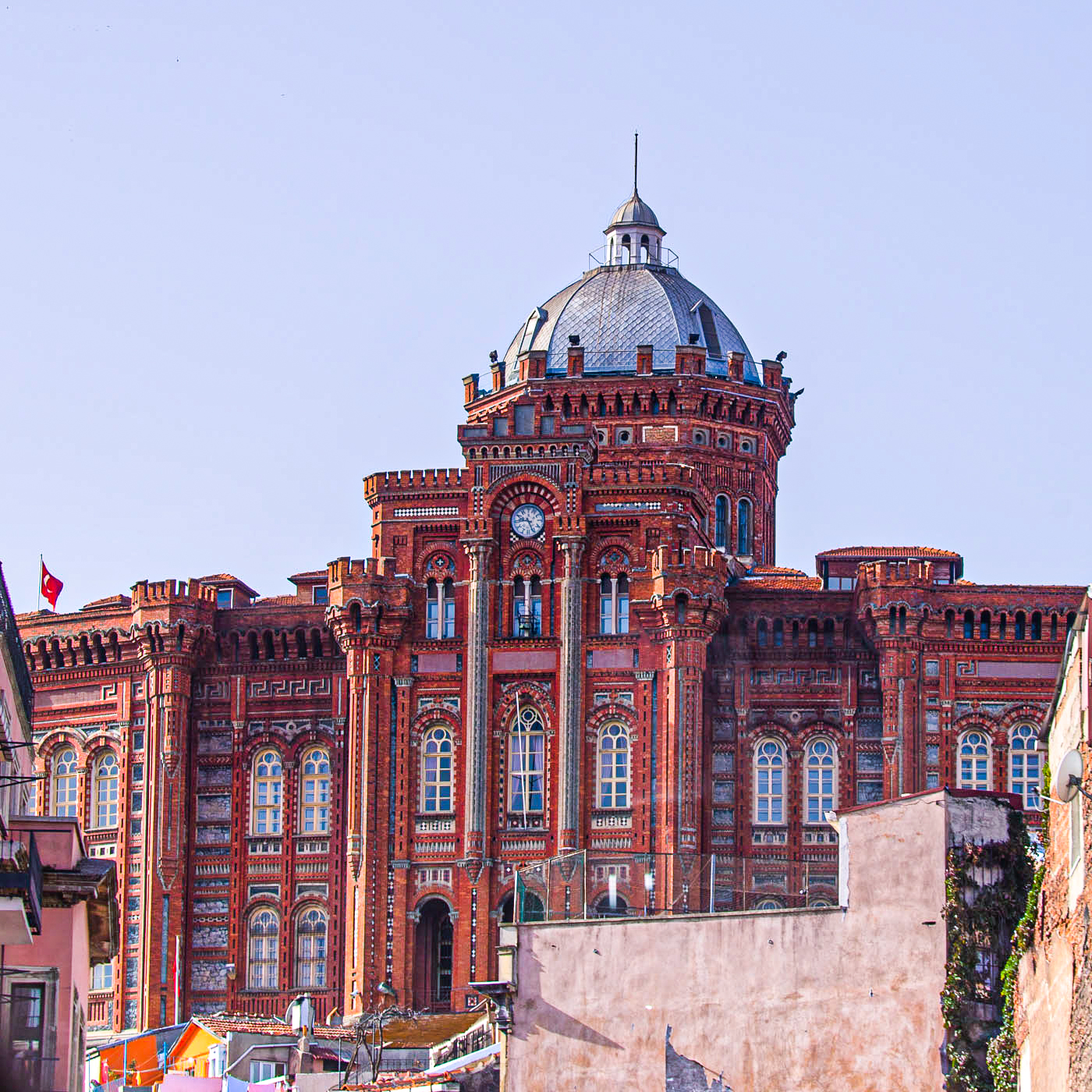

Location
- Istanbul; Turkey
- Coordinates: 41.029°N 28.949°E

Information
- Former name: Ecumenical Patriarchal School (4th–6th centuries); Great Step Mega Vima (6th-8th centuries); Patriarchal Academy (9th–13th centuries); Patriarchal School (14th century – 1804); Patriarchal School of Ksirokrini (1804–1849); Great School of the Nation (1849–present)
- Type: Private school
- Established: 1597; 429 years ago
- Status: Open
- School district: Fener
- Principal: Dimitri Zotos
- Student Union/Association: Megaloscholites' Association

Phanar Greek Orthodox College or Phanar Roman Orthodox Lyceum (Turkish: Özel Fener Rum Lisesi), known in Greek as the Great School of the Nation and Patriarchal Academy of Constantinople (Greek: Μεγάλη του Γένους Σχολή, Megáli toú Genous Scholí), is the oldest surviving and most prestigious Greek Orthodox school in Istanbul, Turkey.

== History ==
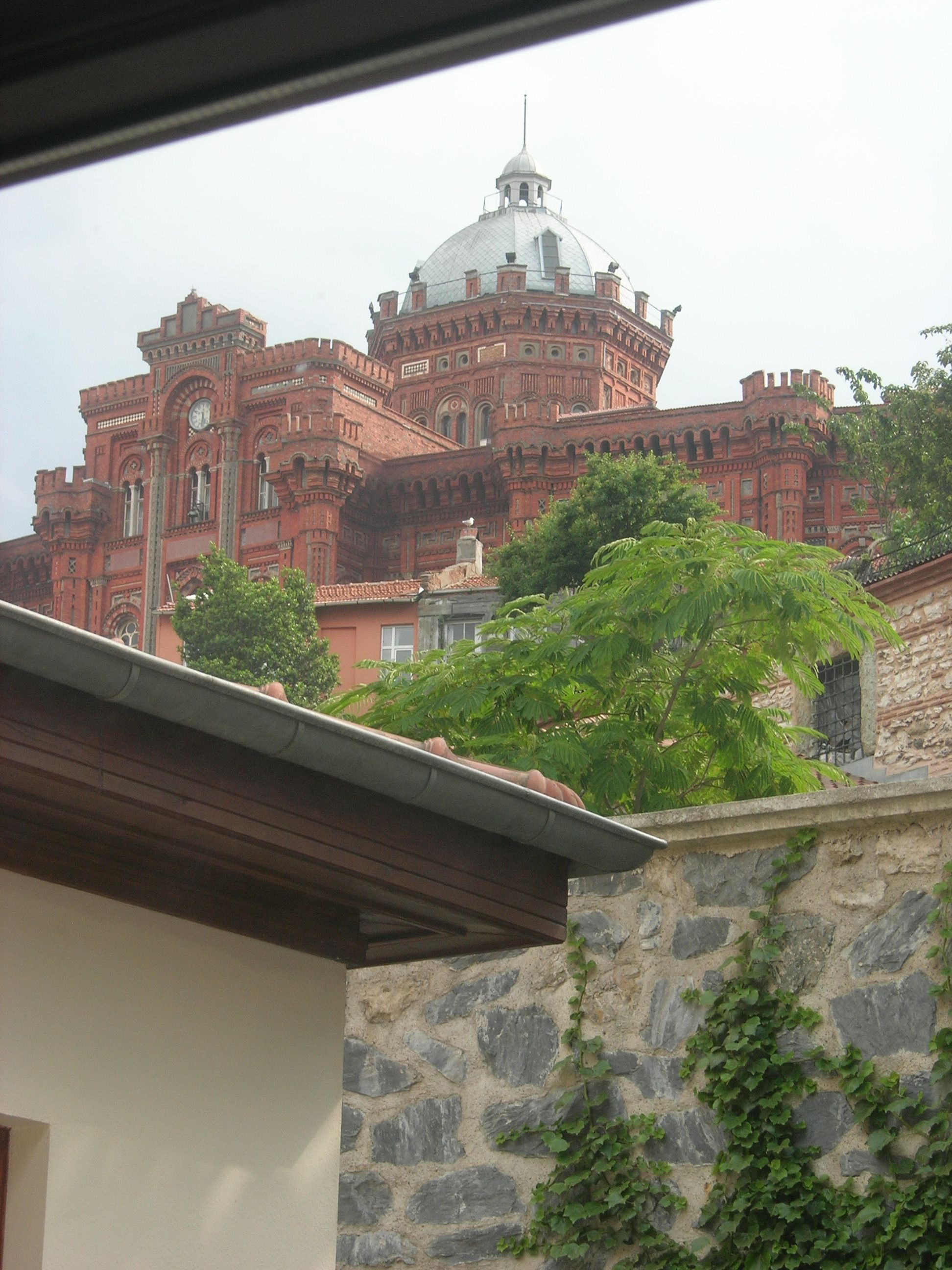
The college seen from a Greek house in Vodina Caddesi

Established in its current form in 1454 by the Patriarch, Gennadius Scholarius who appointed the Thessalonian Matthaios Kamariotis as its first director. It soon became the school of the prominent Greek (Phanariotes) and other Orthodox families in the Ottoman Empire, and many Ottoman ministers as well as Wallachian and Moldavian princes appointed by the Ottoman state, such as Dimitrie Cantemir, graduated from it.

The current school building is located near the Church of St. George in the neighborhood of Fener (Phanar in Greek), which is the seat of the Patriarchate. It is known among the locals with nicknames such as The Red Castle and The Red School.

Designed by the Greek architect Konstantinos Dimadis, the current building was erected between 1881 and 1883 with an eclectic mix of different styles and at a cost of 17,210 Ottoman gold pounds, a huge sum for that period. The money was given by Georgios Zariphis, a prominent Greek banker and financier belonging to the Rum community of Istanbul. Despite its function as a school, the building is often referred to as "the 5th largest castle in Europe" because of its castle-like shape. The large dome at the top of the building is used as an observatory for astronomy classes and has a large antique telescope inside. Today the school, which is the "second largest" school after the Zografeion Lyceum, has six Turkish teachers, while the remaining fifteen are Greek. The school (like all minority schools, as it is compulsory by law) applies the full Turkish curriculum in addition to Greek subjects: Greek language, literature and religion.

In October 2025, the Turkish Ministry of Education notified the school that it must vacate its premises within 90 days due to structural safety concerns. The building failed to meet the updated earthquake reinforcement standards, with costs exceeding 10 million euros. The school's principal stated that the administration does not have the financial means to cover the expenses for the upgrade.

== Gallery ==
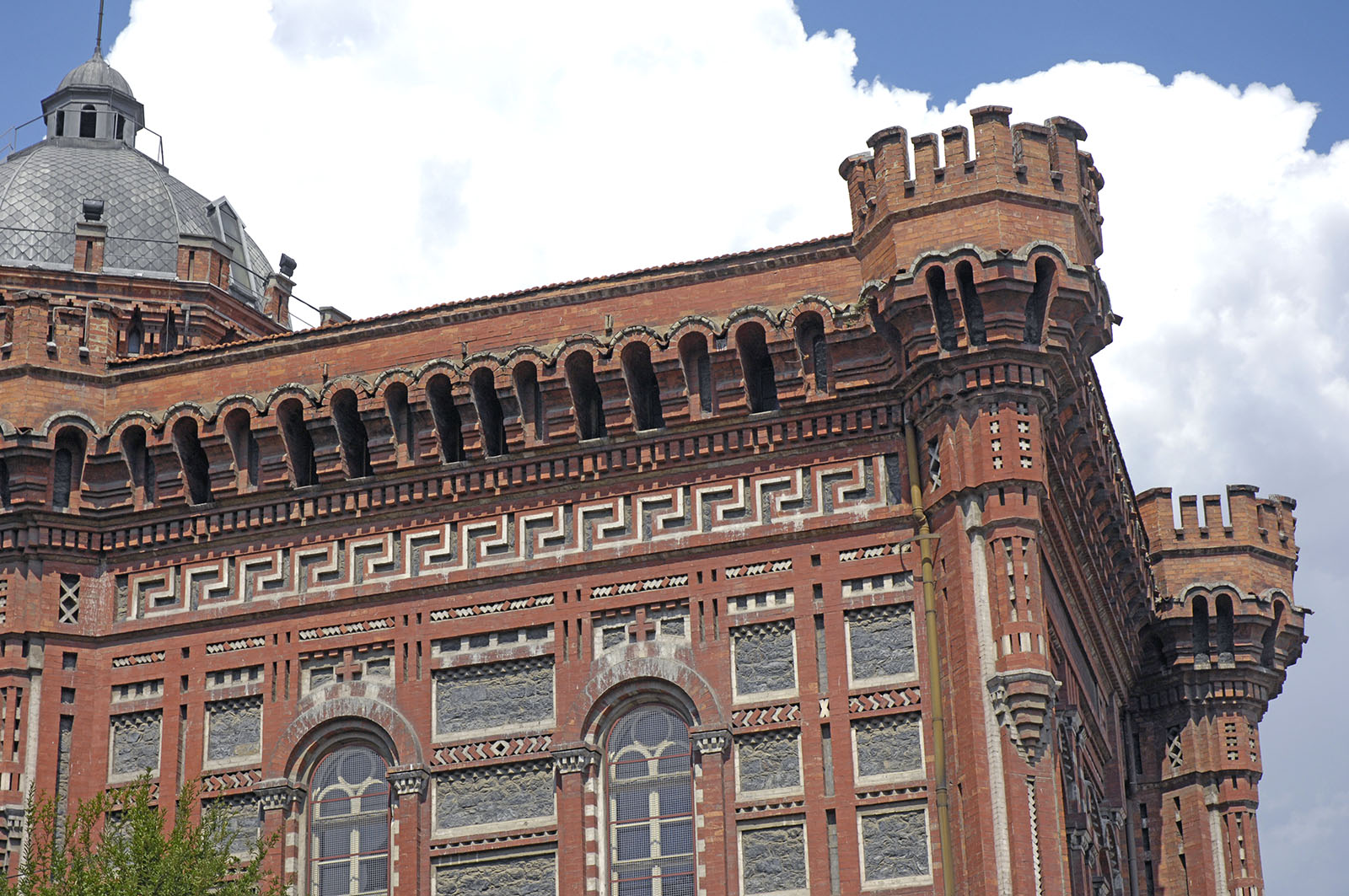
Phanar Greek Orthodox High School

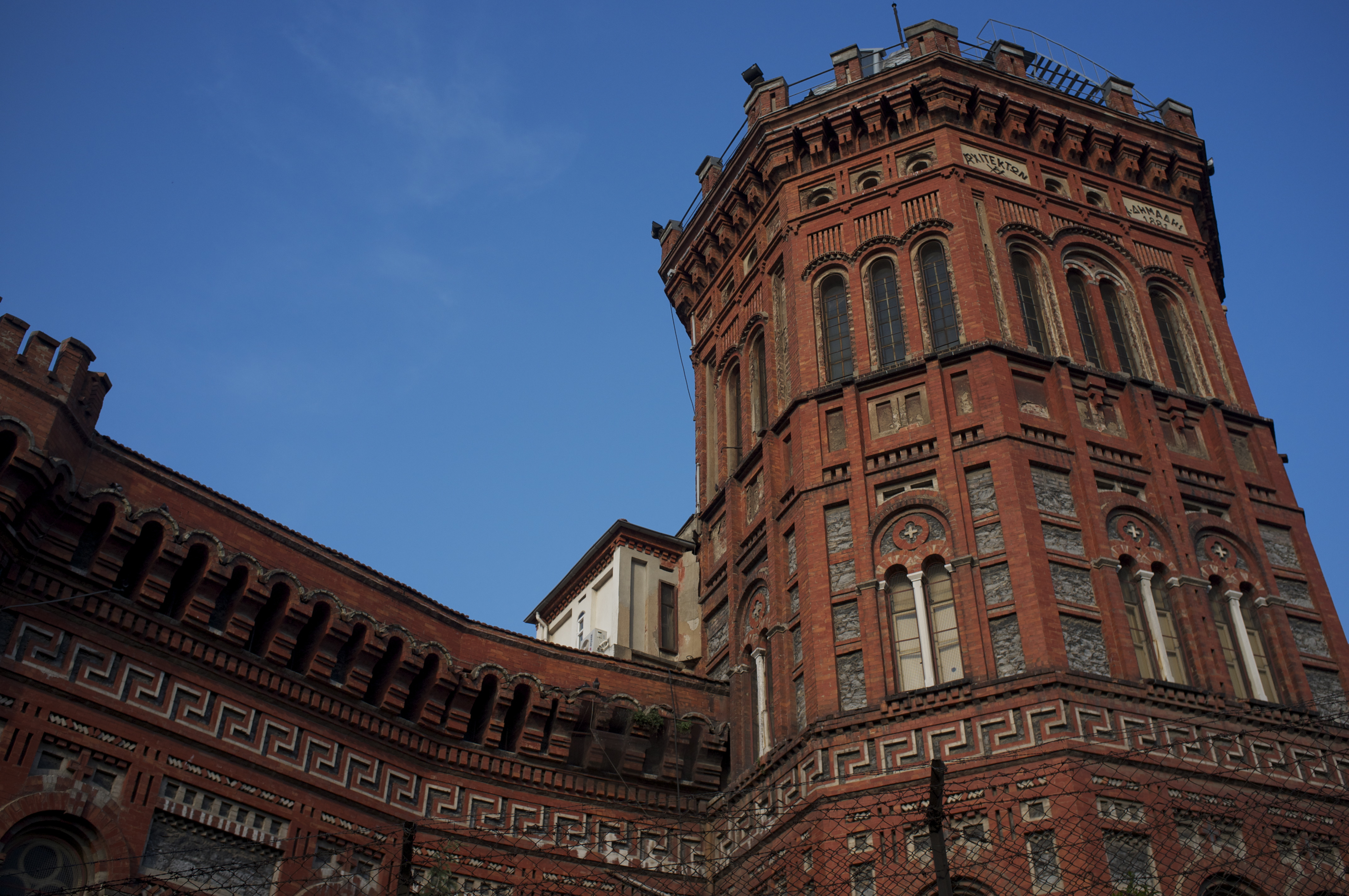
Phanar Greek Orthodox High School

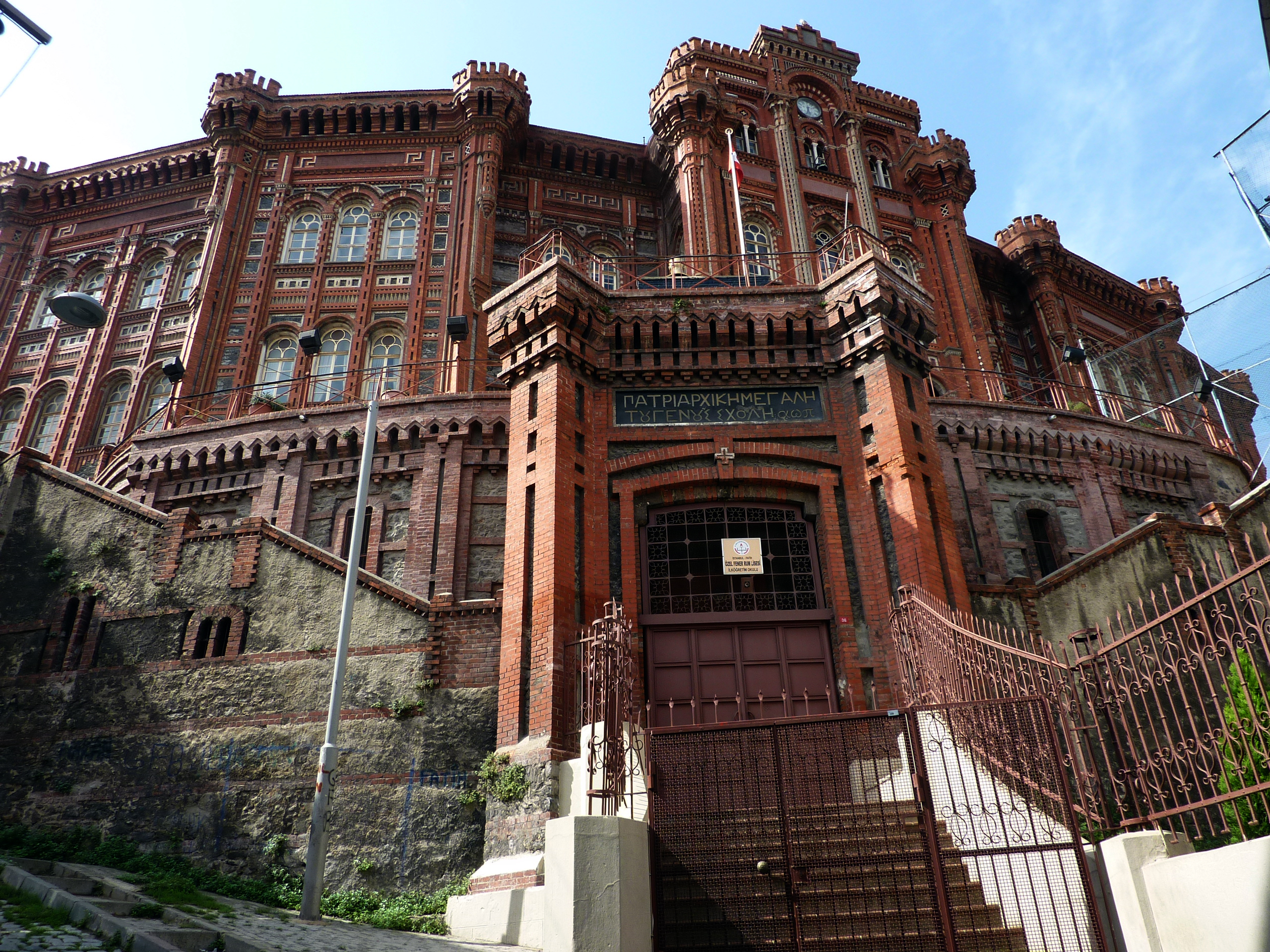
Phanar Greek Orthodox High School

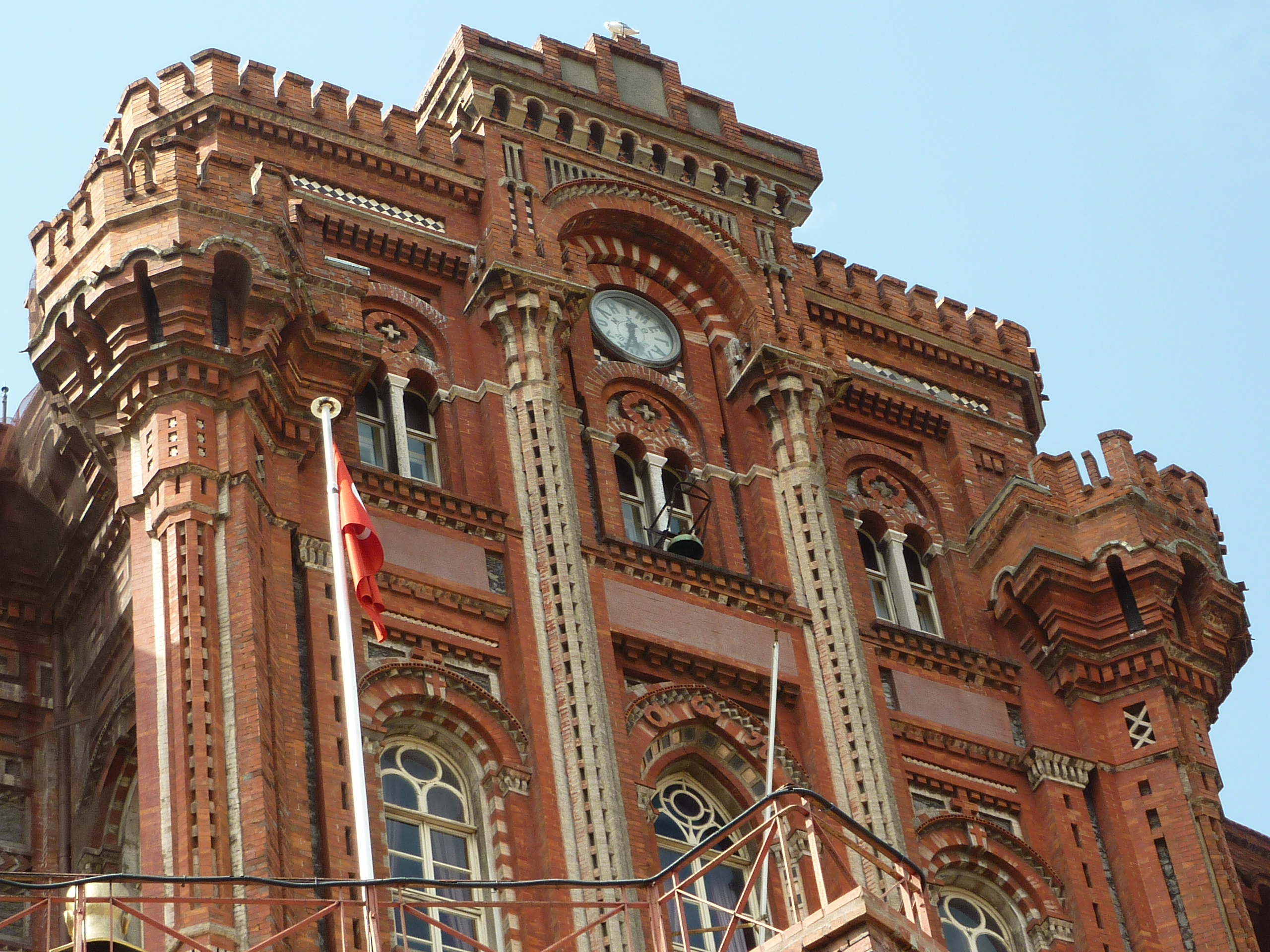
Phanar Greek Orthodox High School

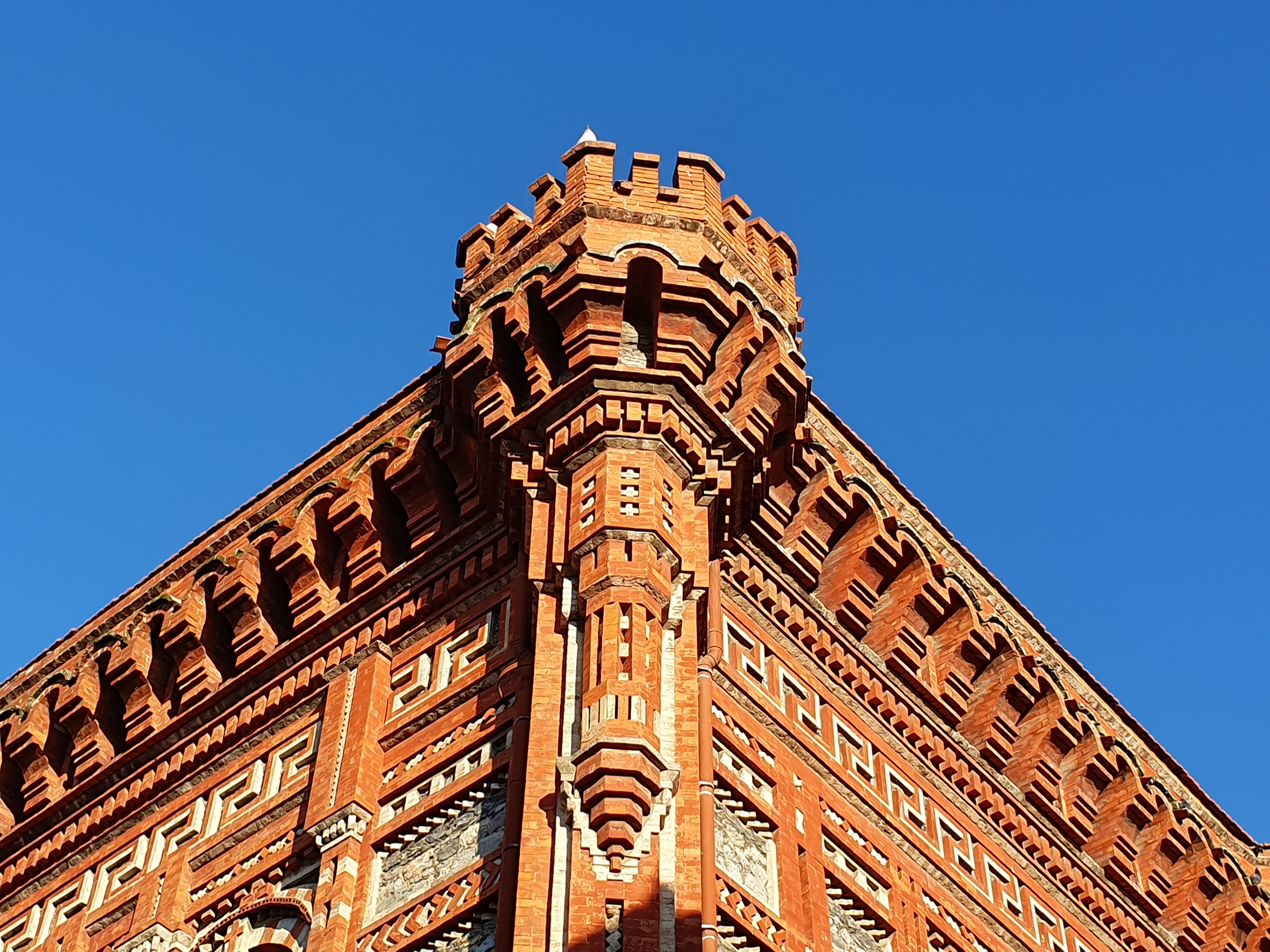
Phanar Greek Orthodox High School

== See also ==
- Ioakeimeion Girls' High School
- Fener
- Greeks in Turkey
- Zografeion Lyceum
- List of schools in Istanbul
- Ottoman Greeks

== Sources ==
- Clogg, Richard (1998). Storia della Grecia moderna (in Italian) (2 ed.). Milan: Bompiani.
