= Şişli Greek Orthodox Cemetery =

Greek Orthodox Cemetery in Istanbul, Turkey

- Interactive map of Şişli Greek Orthodox Cemetery

Details
- Established: 1859
- Location: Şişli, Istanbul
- Country: Turkey
- Coordinates: 41.06214°N 28.99043°E
- Type: Christian Orthodox Cemetery
- Find a Grave: Şişli Greek Orthodox Cemetery

Şişli Greek Orthodox Cemetery (Turkish: Şişli Rum Ortodoks Mezarlığı), also known as Şişli Eastern Orthodox Cemetery, is a Christian cemetery in Istanbul, Turkey. The burial ground is the final resting place of people professing the Orthodox faith in Istanbul. The cemetery is located in Şişli district of Istanbul just across the Cevahir Mall.

== History and description ==
The cemetery was founded in 1859, and consists mostly of Greek graves as well as other Orthodox nationalities and ethnoreligious groups such as Russians, Serbians, Bulgarians, Arab and Turkish/Turkic Christians. The burial ground occupies 52 acres (21 ha), and since its opening,a total of roughly 85,000 individuals have been interred at the site with 3–4 burials taking place weekly.

== Cemetery chapel ==
The funerary church is referred to as Metamorphosis ("Our Lord Saviour´s Transfiguration"). The inscription says that the church was erected in 1888 at the expense of Schilizzi Stephanovik's sons "in eternal memory of their parents".

== Selected notable burials ==
A few of the notables buried here are:

- Eleni Fotiadou (1921–2001), photojournalist
- Anastasia Georgiadou (1891–1939), singer known as "Deniz Kızı Eftalya"
- Demetrius Stefanovich Schilizzi (1839–1893)
- Georgios Zariphis (1810–1884), prominent Greek Ottoman banker and financier

== External links and references ==
- Agelastos Family Genealogy Pages – Sisli Greek Orthodox Cemetery
