= Jonas King =

American missionary

Jonas King (July 29, 1792, in Hawley, Massachusetts, U.S. – May 22, 1869, in Athens, Greece) was a Congregational clergyman from the United States who worked as a missionary, mainly in Greece. His activities in Greece were interrupted by a spell of religious persecution which was finally resolved through diplomatic negotiations between the United States and Greek governments.

== Biography ==
Jonas King was born on July 29, 1792, to Jonathan King (1758-1821) and Abigail Leonard (1763-1839) in Hawley, Massachusetts. His father was also referred to as Jonas Sr. and was a religious man discussing Christ with his son Jonas Jr. daily. King was able to read from the age of four, and by six years of age, he had completed the Old and New Testaments. His father, Jonathan, owned one hundred acres of land where King spent his youth, and they were considered intelligent, church going farmers.

He graduated from Williams College in 1816, and from Andover Theological Seminary in 1819, and was ordained to the ministry of the Congregational Church in Charleston, South Carolina, on December 17, 1819. He then pursued missionary work in South Carolina for six months and returned to Andover for a year of graduate work.

When Amherst College was founded in 1821, he was appointed professor of the oriental languages and literature, and held the chair until 1828, although he spent the years from 1823-25 working for the Palestine mission of the American Board of Commissioners for Foreign Missions in Syria distributing Bibles and preaching. To prepare himself for his missionary duties outside the United States, he had gone to Paris and studied Arabic under De Sacy.

After a brief stay in the United States in 1827/28, he was invited to accompany one of the vessels sent with supplies to the Greeks. King married Anna Aspasia Mengous on the island of Tinos. She was the sister of prominent Greek-American author and educator Petros Mengous. Anna Mengous was the head of the Ladies School at Tinos for Ancient Greek. King established the school.

He continued his connection with the American Board in December of that year, and in 1831 moved to Athens, where he spent the rest of his life as a missionary. In 1832, he had established five schools, and in 1835 began to instruct a class in theology. In 1839, a schoolhouse was finished. King's teachings soon attracted the attention of the authorities of the Greek Orthodox Church, and in 1845 he was excommunicated by the synod of Athens. In 1846, and again in 1847, he was cited to appear before a criminal court. In 1847, a series of articles entitled "The Orgies of King" appeared in an Athens newspaper purporting to describe shameful ceremonies that had been enacted at the missionary's house. In consequence of a popular clamor, King fled to Italy, but in 1848 a friendly ministry came into power, and he returned to Athens.

In 1851, he was appointed U. S. consular agent in Athens, and, on March 23, 1851, some Greeks, who had come to one of his services at his house for the purpose of making a disturbance, were dispersed only by his display of the American flag. After this a new prosecution was begun against him, and, in March 1852, he was condemned to fifteen days' imprisonment and to exile. He had been accused of "reviling the God of the universe and the Greek religion," though he had done no more than preach the ordinary Calvinistic doctrines, and though Greece enjoyed nominal religious freedom.

King appealed from his prison to the Areopagus, which refused to reverse the decision of the lower court, and he then formally protested against his sentence in the name of the U.S. government. King was then temporarily released, and in the following summer George P. Marsh, then minister to Turkey, was charged by the U. S. government with the special investigation of his case, and also to look into King's title to a lot of land, the use of which he had been deprived of by the Greek government for 20 years with no compensation.

The diplomatic correspondence, which fills 200 printed pages of executive documents, resulted in the issue of an order by the King of Greece in 1854, freeing him from the penalty that had been imposed. The action of the U. S. government in this case was of great service to the cause of religious liberty in Greece.

Albert Haven Slocomb, well known for his letter to John Hay questioning the American citizenship of Ion Hanford Perdicaris, traveled to Athens and stayed in King's household between November 1861 and May 1862.

In 1865, King was elected a member of the American Antiquarian Society. After this, King remained in Athens until his death. A Greek Protestant church was erected in Athens in 1874 as the fruit of his labors. Princeton gave him the degree of D.D. in 1832.

== Writings ==
He revised and translated into modern Greek sixteen volumes, among which were Baxter's Saints' Rest and Lyman Beecher's Sermons on Intemperance. He published a "Farewell Letter" in Arabic to his friends in Syria (1825), which was translated into various European languages, put on the Index Expurgatorius at Rome, and produced a great effect in the Eastern Churches.

Other works include:

- The Defence of Jonas King, in Greek (Athens, 1845)
- Speech before the Areopagus, in Greek (New York, 1847)
- Exposition of an Apostolic Church, in Greek (Cambridge, Massachusetts, 1851; French and Italian translations at Malta)
- Religious Rites of an Apostolical Church, in Greek (Athens, 1851)
- Hermeneutics of the Sacred Scriptures, in Greek (1857)
- Sermons, in Greek (2 vols., 1859)
- Synoptical View of Palestine and Syria, in French (Greek translation, Athens, 1859)
- Miscellaneous Works, in Greek, with the documents relating to his various trials (Athens, 1859-1860)
- The Oriental Church and the Latin, in English (1865)

== Bibliography ==
- Mengous, Petros (1830). Narrative of a Greek Soldier. New York, NY: Elliott and Palmer.
- Brewer, Josiah (1830). A Residence at Constantinople, in the Year 1827. New Haven, CT: Durrie and Peck.
- Haines, F. E. H. Haines (1879). Jonas King, Missionary to Syria and Greece. New York, NY: American Tract Society.
- Smith, Walter Burges (1987). America's Diplomats and Consuls of 1776-1865. Washington, D.C.: U.S. Government Printing Office.
