= Ioakeimeion Girls' High School =

Former school in Istanbul, Turkey

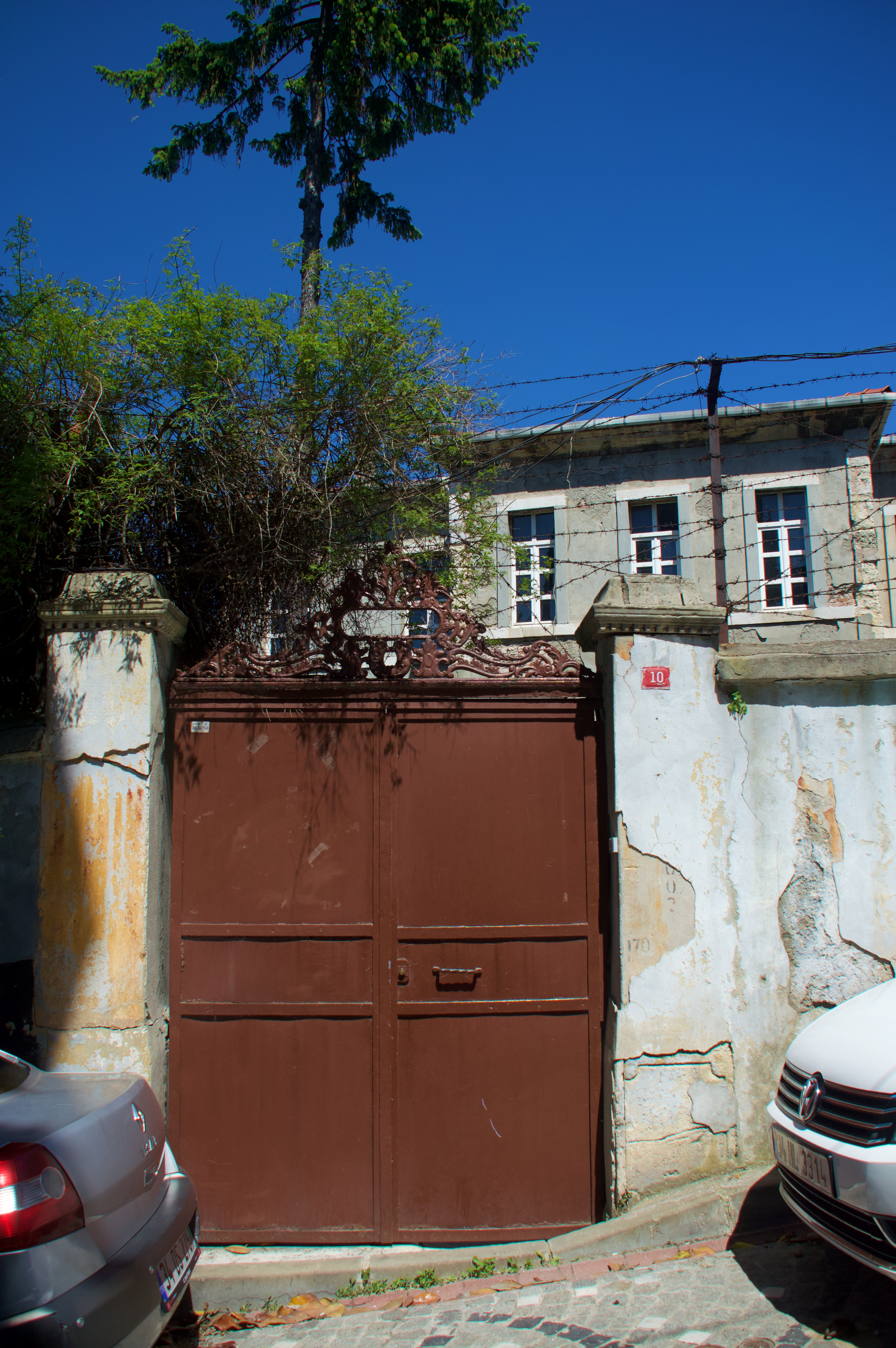
Yuvakimyon Greek Girls' High School

The National Ioakeimeion Girls' High School of Constantinople (Greek: Εθνικόν Ιωακείμειον Παρθεναγωγείον Κωνσταντινουπόλεως; Turkish: Fener Yoakimyon Rum Kız Lisesi, lit. 'Phanar Ioakimion Greek High School for Girls'), commonly known as the Ioakeimeion Girls' High School (Ιωακείμειον Παρθεναγωγείον) is a defunct Greek Orthodox secondary education institution for girls located in Fener quarter of Istanbul, Turkey.

== History ==
After the 1850s, the establishment of a secondary school for girls of the Greek community in the Balat area became necessary because the Greek high school in Pera was quite far and expensive. The Ecumenical Patriarch of Constantinople Joachim II (in office 1860–1863, 1873–1878) donated land for the construction of a school building. As he died before the realization, his successor Joachim III (in office 1878–1884, 1901–1912) laid the foundation of the school building in 1879. The school started operating three years later.

The number of female students of the school reached 590 in 1910. In 1988, the high school was closed due to lack of students to enroll.

After its closing, the nearby Phanar Greek High School for Boys transitioned to mixed education.

== Sources ==
- Iordanoglou, Anastasios K. (1989). Το Εθνικόν Ιωακείμειον Παρθεναγωγείον Κωνσταντινουπόλεως (1882-1988) (in Greek). Thessaloniki: Institute for Balkan Studies. OCLC 71473497.
- Το Ιωακείμειο παρθεναγωγείο Κωνσταντινουπόλεως (εκατόν είκοσι χρόνια από την ίδρυσή του 1882-2002) και ο Σύνδεσμος Ιωακειμειάδων Αθηνών (είκοσι χρόνια από την ίδρυσή του 1982-2002) (in Greek). Athens: Εταιρεία Μελέτης της Καθ' Ημάς Ανατολής. 2006. ISBN 978-960-88703-5-2.
