= Zachos =

Zachos is both a surname and a given name. Notable people with the name include:

== Surname ==
- Aristotelis Zachos (1871–1939), Greek architect
- Cosmas Zachos (born 1951), American physicist
- Helena Zachos (1856–1951), American educator and elocutionist, daughter of John
- James Zachos, American oceanographer and paleoclimatologist
- John Celivergos Zachos (1820–1898), Greek-American educator and elocutionist, father of Helen
- Stathis Zachos (born 1947), Greek computer scientist
- Vanessa Zachos, British actor

== Given name ==
- Zachos Milios (1805–1860), Greek revolutionary
