= Chauncey Colton =

American author, educator, and minister (1800–1876)

Chauncey Colton (August 30, 1800 – April 15, 1876) was an educator, author and clergyman.

== History ==
Chauncey Colton was born in Longmeadow, Massachusetts to Gad and Ann Colton. He began his studies at Monson Academy, as a sophomore, he went to Amherst College and his final year he attended Yale. In the spring of 1827, Colton and classmate Francis Fellowes established Mount Pleasant Classical Institute at Amherst. Colton stayed at Mount Pleasant as associate principal until 1830. He was ordained Deacon in The Protestant Episcopal Church in the United States, Diocese, on July 28, 1830. He was deacon at St. Ann's Church, Brooklyn, New York. In the summer of 1830, he was rector of St. Paul's, Rochester, New York. In Washington, D. C. he became rector of Trinity church. He was ordained Presbyter in the same church in 1831. In 1832, he married Ann Coxe daughter of U.S. Representative from New Jersey William Coxe Jr., Coxe also served as Mayor of Burlington, New Jersey. They had six children. Ann's sister Margaret Coxe lived in Cincinnati, Ohio. Her other sister Harriet married Albert Taylor Bledsoe.

In September 1833, he was the founder and president of Bristol College in Bucks County, Pennsylvania, which combined manual labor and study. One of the students of Mount Pleasant Classical Institute named John C. Zachos followed Colton to Bristol College. Colton remained there from 1833 to 1836. He received an honorary Doctorate of Divinity from NYU in 1835. NYU was four years old. While at Bristol he published the book The Religious Souvenir. He then accepted the Professorship of Pastoral Divinity in the Theological Department of Kenyon College, Gambier, Ohio. He was Professor of Homiletics. Again, Zachos followed Colton to Kenyon College. Attending the institution at the time were future president Rutherford B. Hayes and Supreme Court justice Stanley Matthews. Zachos and Colton were close, when Zachos moved to Cincinnati to live with classmate Matthews, Colton followed. Colton took control of the Trinity Church in Cincinnati, for nearly a year.

In 1841, Abolitionist Salmon P. Chase and Colton were on the Standing Committee of the Diocese of Ohio. According to Western Episcopal Observer edited by Colton, he helped Zachos establish the Mr. Zachos Select School. Now in Cincinnati, he also established St. John's College and Academy with Zachos. Zachos was still attending graduate school and continued to study medicine. He taught mathematics oratory and other courses at the institution. Colton was the President and taught Latin. In 1847, he published, Effective Public Speaking: An Oration, Delivered Before The Burritt Literary Society of Farmers College Ohio. Zachos published a poem by Colton in his book The New American Speaker entitled The Price of Eloquence.

In 1851, Colton became a missionary in the south, he moved to Holly Springs, Mississippi. He was the Principal of St Thomas Hall Military Boys School, and associate rector of Christ Church. Bishop Polk was a fan of the Western Episcopal Observer he began to circulate it in his Diocese during the forties. Polk was one of the largest slaveholders in the south he was a proponent of educating slaves. In 1854, Colton was assistant to Bishop Leonidas Polk in New Orleans for eight months. The church was the Trinity Church New Orleans.

Colton from 1855 became rector of Christ Church, St. Luke's Church (Smithfield, Virginia) for three years. In 1858, he became the rector of Hungars Church, Northampton County, Virginia for the next ten years. He remained in Virginia during the civil war. At 68, he was rector of Emmanuel Episcopal Church (Cumberland, Maryland) until 1872. The next four years of his life he spent with his wife and son, R. Francis Colton in Jenkintown Penn. In 1874, starting in January for 11 months he was in charge of Saint Stephen's Church Wilkesbarre, Pennsylvania. He died of an acute infection of the spinal cord in Jenkintown, Pennsylvania on April 15, 1876. He was a member of the Royal Society of Antiquaries of Copenhagen and the New England Historic Genealogical Society.

== Literary works ==
- The Religious Souvenir 1837
- The Christian Hearer 1838
- Public Speaking: An Oration, Delivered Before The Burritt Literary Society of Farmers College Ohio 1847

== Bibliography ==
- Cutter, William Richard (1907). Memorial Biographies of The New England Historic Genealogical Society Volume VII 1871-1880. Boston Published By the Society 18 Somerset Street 1907.
- McCloud, Henry M. (1874). Obituary record of Graduates of Amherst College for the Academic Year Ending July 9, 1874. Amherst Printer.
- Topping, Eva Catafygiotu (Spring 1976). "John Zachos: Cincinnatian from Constantinople" (PDF). The Cincinnati Historical Society Bulletin. 34 (1). Cincinnati OH. Archived from the original (PDF) on April 8, 2023.
