= Mount Pleasant Classical Institute =

Mount Pleasant Classical Institute, was a boarding school for boys in Amherst, Massachusetts. It operated for five years from 1827 to 1832, and served ages 4–16. It was founded by Amherst College graduates Chauncey Colton D. D. and Francis Fellowes, his brother in-law.

Mount Pleasant Classical Institute consisted of a principal and seven or eight teachers. At one point there were seventy boys. The school offered traditional and progressive elements. The students were allowed to govern themselves. The curriculum had classical courses, commercial theory, and gym.

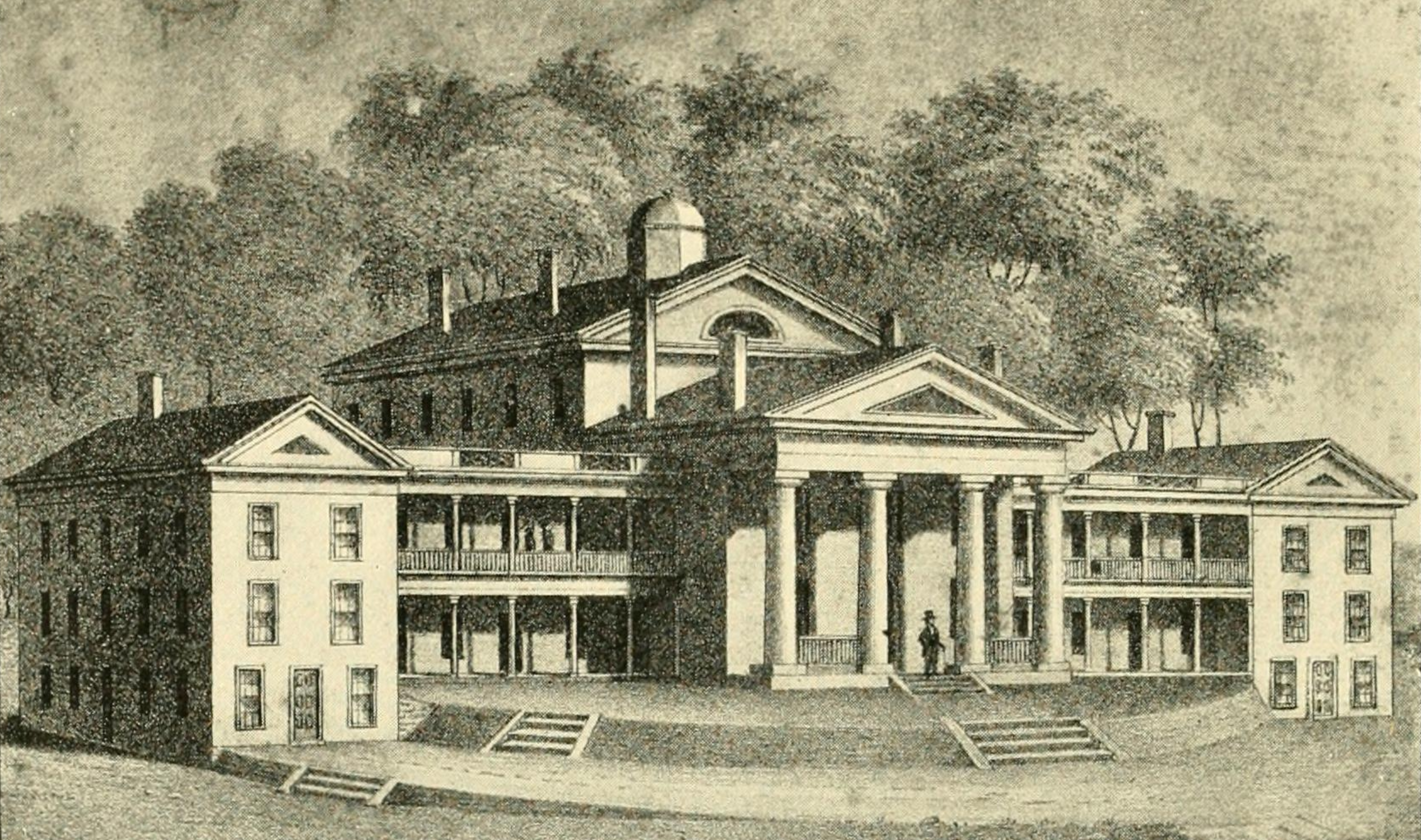
Mount Pleasant Classical Institute was a boys’ boarding school in Amherst, Massachusetts.

Abolitionist preacher Henry Ward Beecher and brother of Harriet Beecher Stowe was the second student enrolled in the school after its inception. Yearly tuition was over $250.

The school was also home to Greek refugees: Abolitionist and woman rights activist John C. Zachos, author and lecturer Christophoros Plato Kastanes, author Alexandros Georgios Paspates, Constantine Fundulakes Newell, Christopher Evangeles. According to Kastanes book, the teachers were Gregory Anthony Perdicaris and Petros Mengous author of Narrative of a Greek Soldier in 1830.

After departing from Mount Pleasant Classical Institute, John C. Zachos followed the Rev Dr. Chauncey Colton to an Episcopalian institution twenty miles north of Philadelphia. Bristol College which was also founded by Dr. Colton it combined manual labor and study.

After the school was closed, the building was partly dismantled and moved to other locations within Amherst. One wing, which became known as the “Bee Hive”, was turned into a tenement house which housed lower-income families and African American refugees during the Civil War.

== Notable alumni ==
- Henry Ward Beecher
- Martin Russell Thayer
- William Carey Crane
- James Roosevelt Bayley

== Bibliography ==
- Kastanes, Christophoros P. (1851). The Greek Exile, Or, a Narrative of the Captivity and Escape of Christophorus Plato Castanis.
