= Helena Zachos =

College professor and elocutionist

Mary Helena Zachos
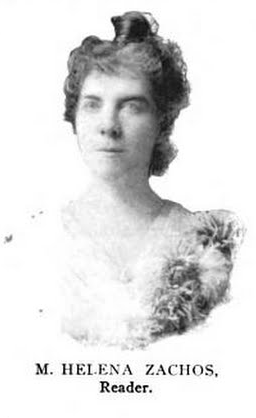
- M. Helena Zachos, in a 1900 publication.
- Born: March 5, 1856
- Died: February 28, 1951 (aged 94); New York City
- Resting place: Newton Cemetery, Newton, Massachusetts
- Education: Wells College; American Academy of Dramatic Arts
- Occupations: Professor; Author; Acting Coach; Elocutionist
- Employer: Cooper Union
- Known for: Elocution; Oratory Debate; Parliamentary Procedure; M. Helena Zachos 1875 Prize
- Parents: John Celivergos Zachos (father); Harriet Tompkins Canfield (mother)
- Relatives: George Canfield Blickensderfer (cousin)

Mary Helena Zachos (March 5, 1856 – February 28, 1951) was an American author, dramatic reader, playwright, professor, and elocutionist. She was the daughter of abolitionist and women's rights activist John Celivergos Zachos. Her father also wrote countless books in the field of elocution and was the library curator and a professor at Cooper Union twelve years after the founding of the institution. Helena followed in her father's footsteps. She was a faculty member at the same institution for over forty-two years from 1897 to 1939 teaching elocution, oratory debate, and parliamentary procedure.

Helena was born in Dayton, Ohio, to a prominent family. Her mother was Harriet Tompkins Canfield and her father was John Celivergos Zachos. She had three sisters and two brothers. During the American Civil War, her father was an active participant in the education of freed slaves during the Port Royal Experiment. The family briefly lived in Pennsylvania where her father was a Unitarian minister and also lectured at Cornell University in Ithaca, New York, before permanently moving to New York City in 1871. By 1871, Helena and her sister Margaret Altona Zachos enrolled at Wells College. Helena continued her studies at the American Academy of Dramatic Arts and settled in New York City with her parents and became associated with Cooper Union for the rest of her life.

She was the president of the Eastern Association of Wells College and a member of the New York Teachers of Oratory. In honor of her excellence and outstanding achievements, Wells College established an award in 1900 in her honor entitled the M. Helena Zachos 1875 Prize. The prize is awarded every year to the student who has submitted the best written English prose. She retired at 83 years old and died twelve years later at 94 years old in New York City. She was buried with her parents in Boston at Newton Cemetery.

== Early life ==
Mary Helena Zachos was born in Dayton, Ohio, the daughter of John Celivergos Zachos and Harriet Tompkins Canfield Zachos. Her father was born in Constantinople of Greek parents, and brought to the United States by American educational reformer Samuel Gridley Howe. The elder Dr. Zachos also taught oratory at Cooper Union.

Helena Zachos attended Wells College, graduating in 1875; she pursued further training at the American Academy of Dramatic Arts.

== Career ==
Helena Zachos taught English, oratory, debate, parliamentary procedure, and elocution classes at Cooper Union beginning in 1897, with very popular classes in the school's extension catalog. She was the coach of the school's debating teams, and advised student commencement speakers until 1939. For some of her tenure at Cooper Union, she also taught "expression" at the Friends Seminary in New York. Zachos also wrote one-act plays, poems, and pieces for recitation.

On October 16, 1922, Helena copyrighted four plays with the U.S. Patient Office. The Magic Peacock Feather, A Persian Play, The Sculptor of Athens and The Wizard. The Magic Peacock Feather was a play set in Ancient China in two acts and featured two scenes. A Persian Play was set in two acts and featured six scenes. It was adapted from two stories taken from Arabian Nights. The Sculptor of Athens was a one-act play set in three scenes. The Wizard was a one-act play that featured three scenes set in a tiny Russian village. Her own performances as a dramatic reader were admired for their "penetration and magnetism".

She was president of the Wells College Club of New York, and a trustee of the Library Lecture Association. She also served on the executive board of the National Association of Elocutionists.

== Personal life ==
Zachos died in 1951, just before her 95th birthday, in New York City. Wells College awards the M. Helena Zachos 1875 Prize for excellence in prose composition.

== Literary works ==
Books and articles authored by Helena Zachos
Date	Title
1895	On a City Pier
1930	Parliamentary Procedure and Public Speaking

== Plays ==
Plays authored by Helena Zachos
Date	Title
1922	The Magic Peacock Feather
1922	A Persian Play
1922	The Sculptor of Athens
1922	The Wizard

== Bibliography ==
- Werner, Edgar S. (1898). Werner's Magazine, Volume 21. 108 East 16th Street, New York, New York: Sanford & Kenworthy Printers.
- Hanna, John Calvin (1897). Beta Theta Pi Biography of John C. Zachos. New York, New York: Beta Theta Pi.
- Goertz, Albert (1906). Cooper Union For the Advancement of Science and Art Fourth Seventh Annual Report. New York, NY: Cooper Union.
- Devins, John Bancroft (1903). "Annual Debate at Copper Union". New York Observer. 81 (22). New York, NY.
- Putnam, Herbert (1922). "Catalogue of Copyright Entries Pamphlets, Leaflets, Contributions to Newspapers or Periodicals, Etc.; Lectures, Sermons, Addresses for Oral Delivery; Dramatic Compositions; Maps; Motion Pictures". Catalogue of Copyright Entries. 19 (10). Washington DC.
