= William Coxe Jr. =

American politician (1762–1831)

William Coxe Jr. (May 3, 1762 – February 25, 1831) was a pioneer pomologist and a U.S. Representative from New Jersey. He served as Mayor of Burlington, New Jersey, from 1807 to 1815.

== Personal life ==
Born in Burlington, New Jersey, he was the son to Mary Francis and William Coxe.

William married Rachel Smith. He had eight children with Rachel Smith. She was the daughter of Richard Smith and the only heir to a substantial fortune. He received a significant portion of inheritance from his wife's family. As a gesture to his wife, he made a will leaving her an estate in Pennsylvania and New York on January 15, 1822. The names of the eight children were Maria, Margaret, Anne, Harriet, Emily, William Smith, Richard Smith and Elizabeth.

He died in Burlington, New Jersey, on February 25, 1831. He was interred in St. Mary's Churchyard.

== Politician ==
William Coxe Jr. served as a member of the New Jersey General Assembly 1796–1804 from 1806 to 1809, and again in 1816 and 1817. He served as speaker 1798–1800 and again in 1802. Coxe was elected as a Federalist to the Thirteenth Congress (March 4, 1813 – March 3, 1815).

== Pomologist ==
Coxe is better known as a pomologist. He maintained the first experimental orchard in America. His A View of Cultivation of Fruit Trees, and the Management of Orchards and Cider (1817) was the first book on pomology written by an American or about American fruit trees. The illustrated book provided information about 200 fruits, including apples, cherries, peaches, pears, and plums.

== Abolitionist ==
William Coxe Jr. and his brother Tench Coxe were abolitionists. Tench was a political economist and abolitionist leader. He was a founding member and secretary of the Pennsylvania Society for Promoting the Abolition of Slavery in Philadelphia around 1787. William was a member and delegate of the New Jersey Society for Promoting the Abolition of Slavery. It was founded in 1793. Their distant relative was radical abolitionist Samuel Hanson Cox.

== See also ==
- Chauncey Colton
- Albert Taylor Bledsoe

U.S. House of Representatives
Preceded by N/A	Member of the U.S. House of Representatives from New Jersey's 3rd congressional district 1813–1815	Succeeded by N/A
