= Sophia McIlvaine Herrick =

American writer and editor

Sophia McIlvaine Herrick (née Bledsoe; March 26, 1837 – October 9, 1919) was an American science writer, editor, and literary critic.

== Life ==
Born as Sophia McIlvaine Bledsoe on March 26, 1837, the daughter of Albert Taylor Bledsoe and Harriet (née Coxe) Bledsoe (of Gambier, Ohio), Sophia moved to New York after her marriage to the Reverend James B. Herrick, by whom she had several children. The couple separated when Herrick left the ministry to become a member of the Oneida Community.

She joined her father in Baltimore, contributing to his journal The Southern Review. In Baltimore, she opened a school for girls. She pursued an early interest in evolutionary theory by studying biology at Johns Hopkins University and published scientific articles in Century and Scribner's Magazine for a general audience. She became a frequent contributor of articles, writing as Mrs S. B. Herrick, and was for a time assistant editor to Richard Watson Gilder at Century. Her later works were on natural history and travel.

Sophia Bledsoe Herrick died on October 9, 1919, in Greenwich, Connecticut, aged 82. She had three children: Albert (born 1862), Virginia (born 1863), and Louise (born 1866). Her granddaughter was the anthropologist Sophie Bledsoe Aberle.

== Books ==
- 1883: The Wonders of Plant Life under the Microscope @ Internet Archive
- 1885: Chapters on Plant Life
- 1888: The Earth in Past Ages @ Internet Archive
- 1902: Editor of A Century of Sonnets
