= Benjamin Chew Tilghman =

American soldier and inventor

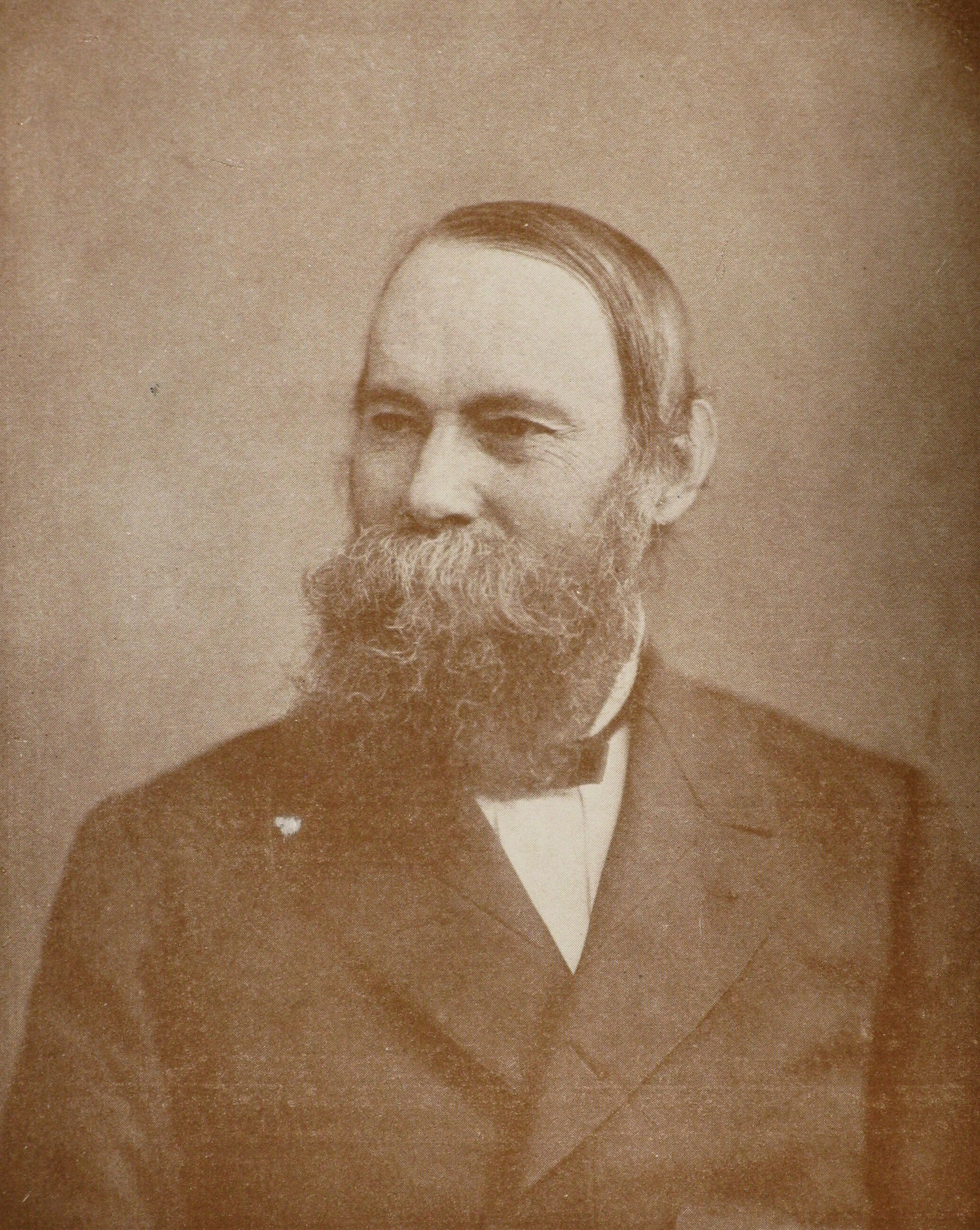
- Photo of Tilghman by Frederick Gutekunst
- Born: October 26, 1821; Philadelphia, Pennsylvania, U.S.
- Died: July 3, 1901 (aged 79); Philadelphia, Pennsylvania, U.S.
- Burial place: Church of St. James the Less
- Education: Bristol College; University of Pennsylvania (1839)
- Occupation: Inventor
- Known for: Inventor of the process of sandblasting
- Relatives: William Tilghman
- Awards: Elliott Cresson Medal

Signature
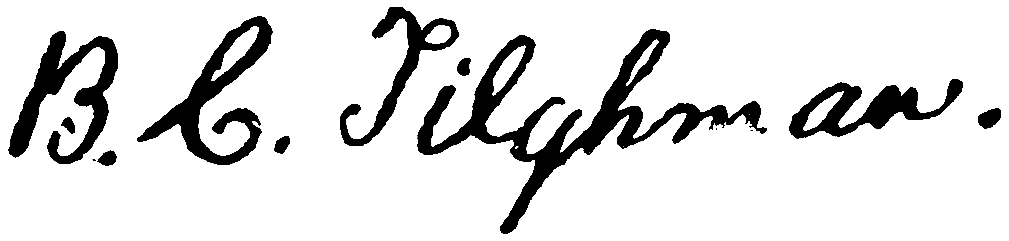

Benjamin Chew Tilghman (October 26, 1821 — July 3, 1901) was an American soldier and inventor. He is best known as the inventor of the process of sandblasting.

== Early life ==
He was born in Philadelphia, Pennsylvania, on October 26, 1821, the third child of Benjamin and Anne Marie (McMurtie). His father was descended from Richard Tilghman, a surgeon in the British Navy; he was related to William Tilghman, Chief Justice of Philadelphia.

Tilghman was educated at Bristol College and later at the University of Pennsylvania, where he graduated with a degree in law in 1839, though he never practiced this profession. With his brother, Richard, he spent much time before the war journeying through Europe, visiting laboratories, chemical works and mills. He was elected as a member to the American Philosophical Society in 1871.

== Civil War career ==
At the outbreak of the American Civil War, he volunteered as a Captain in the 26th Pennsylvania Infantry Regiment, rising to Colonel and commander of the 29th Pennsylvania Volunteer Infantry. He was severely wounded in the thigh at the Battle of Chancellorsville in 1863 and sent home to recover. Upon his recovery, he accepted the role of Colonel and commander of the 3rd United States Colored Troops. He was brevetted Brigadier General, US Volunteers on April 13, 1865 for "meritorious services".

== Invention of the sandblasting process ==
Legend has it that Tilghman had seen the effect of wind-blown sand on windows in the desert while a general in the army, and that this was the basis of his sandblasting invention.

Around 1870, he invented the sandblasting process and filed a patent for it in the US (US patent 108,408.), detailing many of the applications for which this technique is uniquely suited, such as sharpening files, engraving bottles, cleaning boilers or bringing out the grain in wood. Later that year, a patent was issued in the UK.

In 1871, at the 40th Exhibition of the American Institute of the City of New York, he was awarded the institute's Great Medal of Honor for his invention; shortly after, he was also awarded the Elliott Cresson Medal by the Franklin Institute.

He refined the technique for various purposes and, in 1877, took out a patent (US patent 252,279) for sharpening files, which he marketed as "Liquid Grindstone".

Further patents and developments followed.

== Commercial ventures ==
His first company was formed with his brother in Philadelphia—B. C. & R. A. Tilghman—for the production of chilled iron shot for the stone industry. Around 1879, Benjamin moved to London, forming a new company, Tilghman's Patent Sand Blast Co. at Gray's Inn Road. This company used one of his patent methods for sharpening files and rasps. From London, he moved to Sheffield, the centre of steel production in England at the time, and later moved to Altrincham in Cheshire, being resident there around 1885, having invested in the machine tool company George Richards Ltd.

In 1879, he opened the gates of his new works in Broadheath, Altrincham, which became the hub of the sand blasting industry in Great Britain. This lastly formed company, later called Wheelabrator Tilghman, and since 2005, Wheelabrator Group, still trades.

== Other inventions ==
While working on the sandblasting process, he was also involved in the processing of stone, which led him to invent a production method for iron shot - pouring a stream of molten metal onto a revolving surface, from which the globules would be propelled into cold water (US patent 187,239, 1872). This material was in high demand for cutting stone.

Around 1880, he invented the sulfite method of fiber reduction for paper production; this was a critical part of the production of paper from wood pulp, competing with the Kraft process.

He also patented a design for a torpedo to be propelled "rocket fashion" by a slow-burning powder. It was not successful. He was assisted in this venture by his nephew, Benjamin C. Tilghman III.

He died on July 3, 1901, and is buried in the churchyard of Church of St. James the Less in Philadelphia.

== Known patents ==
- U.S. Patent No. 108,408 - sandblasting (1870)
- U.S. Patent No. 133,501, "Improvement in cutting in stone and other hard substances" (1872) - cutting stone by means of steel shot
- U.S. Patent No. 174,167, "Improvement in process of producing designs upon hard surfaces" (1875)
- U.S. Patent No. 187,239 - production of iron shot (1872)
- U.S. Patent no. 252,279 - sharpening of files (1877)
- U.S. Patent No. 446,988
- U.S. Patent No. RE7,499
- U.S. Patent no. 702,040, "Sand-blast tumbling barrel" (attributed to "Benjamin C. Tilghman Jr.")
- U.S. patent No. 416,873 "Cutting metal by electricity" (1889)
- UK Patent no. 2147 (1870) - sandblasting
- UK Patent no. 2900 (1870) - blast wheel
- UK Patent no. 13,510 (1885) - roughening iron and steel rolls

== Footnotes ==
.
