= Argus of Western America =

American newspaper (1808–1830)

The Argus of Western America was a newspaper published in Frankfort, Kentucky. Amos Kendall was its editor-in-chief and William Gerrard its publisher. It was published from 1808 until 1830.

Moses O. (Owsley) Bledsoe was also a publisher of the weekly paper. Bledsoe emancipated several slaves in Missouri in 1829. Bledsoe also published the Commentator in Frankfort (1817–1820). He was the father of Albert Taylor Bledsoe. He partnered with J. H. Farnham. He lost out to Kendall and Russells in the vote for public printers in Kentucky. Bledsoe and his son were parties to Abraham Lincoln's broadsword duel.

The paper supported Henry Clay, who helped fund newspapers, but switched allegiances to his rival Andrew Jackson after 1824.
