= Albert Taylor Bledsoe =

American priest, mathematician and army officer

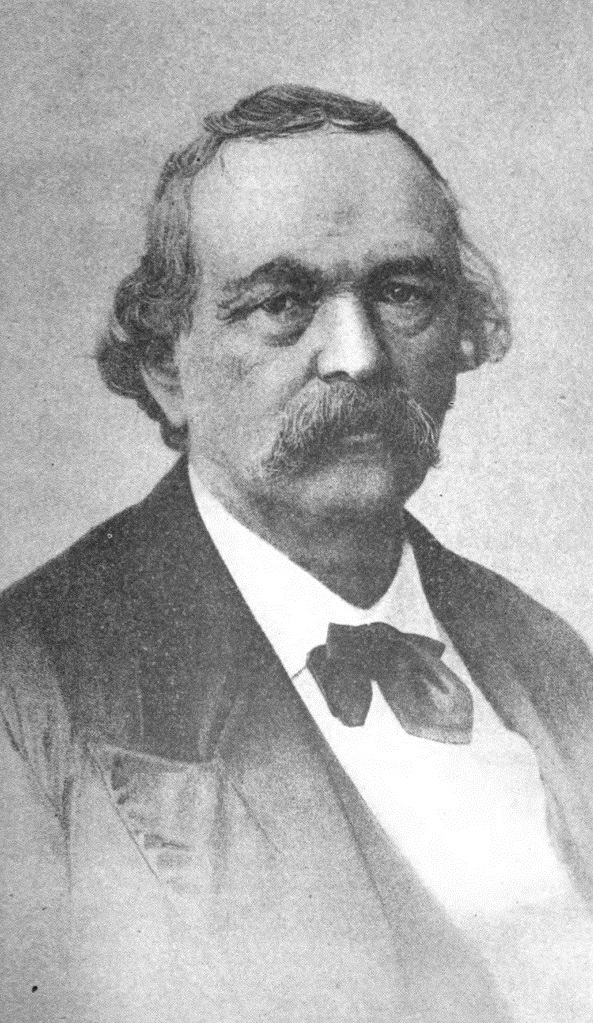
- Born: November 9, 1809; Frankfort, Kentucky
- Died: December 8, 1877 (aged 68); Alexandria, Virginia (another source says Baltimore, Maryland)
- Education: United States Military Academy; Kenyon College, Ohio
- Occupations: educator, attorney, author, and clergyman
- Political party: Whig Party (United States)
- Spouse: Harriet Coxe (married in 1836)
- Children: 7, including Sophia Bledsoe Herrick
- Parent(s): Moses Owsley Bledsoe and Sophia Childress Taylor
- Relatives: Margaret Coxe (sister-in-law); Sophie Bledsoe Aberle (great-granddaughter)

Albert Taylor Bledsoe (November 9, 1809 – December 8, 1877) was an American Episcopal priest, attorney, professor of mathematics, and officer in the Confederate army and was best known as a staunch defender of slavery and, after the South lost the American Civil War, an architect of the Lost Cause. He was the author of Liberty and Slavery (1856), "the most extensive philosophical treatment of slavery ever produced by a Southern academic", which defended slavery laws as ensuring proper societal order.

== Early life and education ==
Bledsoe was born on November 9, 1809, in Frankfort, Kentucky, the oldest of five children of Moses Owsley Bledsoe and Sophia Childress Taylor (who was a relative of President Zachary Taylor). He was a cadet at the United States Military Academy at West Point from 1825 to 1830, where he was a fellow cadet of Jefferson Davis and Robert E. Lee. After serving two years in the United States Army, he studied law and theology at Kenyon College in Gambier, Ohio, and received his M.A. and LL.M. In 1836. he married Harriet Coxe of Burlington, New Jersey, and they had seven children, four of whom survived childhood.

His daughter was the author Sophia Bledsoe Herrick.

== Mathematics professor ==
- Adjunct Professor of Mathematics and French, Kenyon College, (OH) 1833–1834.
- Professor of Mathematics, Miami University 1834–1835.
- Professor of Mathematics and Astronomy, University of Mississippi 1848–1854.
- Professor of Mathematics, University of Virginia 1854–1861.

Bledsoe in his lectures at the University of Virginia would frequently "interlard his demonstration of some difficult problem in differential or integral calculus—for example, the lemniscata of Bernouilli [sic]—with some vigorous remarks in the doctrine of States' rights".

=== Philosophy of Mathematics (1868) ===
The subtitle is "With special reference to the elements of geometry and the infinitesimal method." In fact, the book is concerned with quadratures and the foundations of integrals.

There are eight chapters, each concerned with a "method". First, of infinitesimals, then indivisibles, Cavalieri, Descartes, Leibnitz, and Newton. His aim is to "lay out and construct a satisfactory and easy road across the Alpine heights of the transcendental analysis." He cites Reflexions sur la Metaphysique du Calcul Infinitesimal (1797) of Lazare Carnot for a description of the ancient Greek method of exhaustion where arbitrary regions may be approximated by polygons. The contributions of Berkeley, a Maclaurin, a Carnot, a D’Alembert, a Cauchy, a Duhamel have not yet removed the "unmathematical obscurities". For instance, in his view, "The truth is, the principle that a curve is made up of indefinitely small right lines is one of those false conceptions of the infinitesimal method which, as we shall hereafter see, have formed themselves into the clouds and darkness that have so long hung around the heights of the transcendental analysis." He illustrates with various editions of Charles Davies's Elements of Geometry and Trigonometry, translated from the works of A. M. Legendre. The 1828 edition was revised in 1856. The first chapter concludes with the opinion, "attempts of Dr. Whewell to solve the enigmas of the calculus are, as we shall have occasion to see, singularly awkward and unfortunate."

== Public service ==
In 1835, Bledsoe became an Episcopal minister and became an assistant to Bishop Benjamin Bosworth Smith of Kentucky. He abandoned his clerical career in 1838 because of his opposition to infant baptism. Later in life, he was ordained a Methodist minister in 1871, but he never took charge of a church. He was a strenuous advocate of the doctrine of free will and his views are set forth in his book Examination of Edwards on the Will (1845).

In 1838, Bledsoe moved to Springfield, Illinois, where he was a law partner of Edward D. Baker, and where he practiced law in the same courts as Abraham Lincoln and Stephen Douglas. He practiced before the United States Supreme Court in Washington DC from 1840 to 1848.

In 1842 Abraham Lincoln accepted a challenge to fight a duel with James Shields. He consulted with Bledsoe on strategy and was told to select broadswords as weapons, with the intent to induce Shields to decline the duel.

Bledsoe is remembered for his 1856 treatise An Essay on Liberty and Slavery, which presented an extended proslavery argument. Bledsoe argued that the natural state of humans was in society, not in nature, and that humans in society needed to have restraints on their actions. That is, he argued that liberty was greatest when humans were allowed to exercise only the amount of freedom they were naturally suited to. Some had to be restrained; others were entitled to freedom.

In 1861, Bledsoe received a commission as a colonel in the Confederate army, and later became Acting Assistant Secretary of War. In 1863 he was sent to London for the purpose of researching various historical problems relating to the north–south conflict, as well as guiding British public opinion in favor of the Confederate cause. In 1868 he moved back to the United States and published the Southern Review. He was the "epitome of an unreconstructed Southerner" and published articles defending slavery and secession.

Bledsoe died on December 8, 1877, in Alexandria, Virginia.

== Writings ==
- 1845: Examination of Edwards on the Will
- 1853: A Theodicy, or Vindication of the Divine Glory
- 1856: Essay on Liberty and Slavery
- 1866: Is Davis a Traitor? or Was Secession a Constitutional Right previous to the War of 1861?
- 1868: The Philosophy of Mathematics, with Special Reference to the Elements of Geometry and the Infinitesimal Method

=== The Southern Review ===
In 1867 Bledsoe began The Southern Review which he edited until his death when his daughter Sophia Bledsoe Herrick became editor (1877 to 1879). The first year had two volumes, later one volume per year. Each issue contained book notices of recent publication. History was the primary topic, but volumes contain diverse content.

- Volume 1 begins with Bledsoe's philosophy of history, citing five sources.
- Volume 2 begins with “Ireland and her miseries”. It includes an article “Canada and the United States”.
- Volume 3 begins with Draper's history of the American Civil War. It also includes review of 11 textbooks on history of the United States.
- Volume 4 includes a biography of William Shakespeare by C Knight.
- Voume 5 includes articles on the nature and laws of light.
- 1867—79: The Southern Review via HathiTrust (26 volumes)
