= Port Royal Experiment =

Program during the American Civil War in which former slaves worked on abandoned land

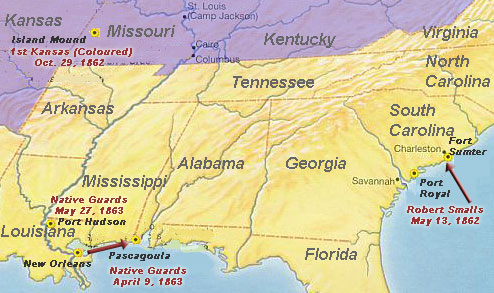
Map of early African American involvement in the Civil War, including the Port Royal Experiment

The Port Royal Experiment was a program begun during the American Civil War in which former slaves successfully worked on the land abandoned by planters. Former slaves also bought land for themselves, and Northern missionaries and abolitionists came to teach the freedmen.

== History ==
In 1861 the Union captured the Sea Islands off the coast of South Carolina and their main harbor, Port Royal. The white residents fled, leaving behind 10,000 black slaves. Several private Northern charity organizations stepped in to help the former slaves become self-sufficient. The result was a model of what Reconstruction could have been. The African Americans demonstrated their ability to work the land efficiently and live independently of white control. They assigned themselves daily tasks for cotton growing and spent their extra time cultivating their own crops, fishing and hunting. By selling their surplus crops, the locals acquired small amounts of property. But it wasn't specifically meant to be a way to envision the future of America but rather a way to stray away from slavery while Reconstruction went on.

Among the Northerners who arrived as teachers were Mary Lambert Allen and her husband William Francis Allen from West Newton, Massachusetts. Detailed descriptions of their daily life are provided in his diaries, which have been transcribed. Admiration for the hard work ethic of the former slaves is mentioned, as well as the urgent need for a basic education of which they had been deprived. Allen also took notes on the language, songs and music he heard which he later published. In 1862, General Ormsby M. Mitchel helped African Americans to found the town of Mitchelville on Hilton Head Island. After the assassination of Abraham Lincoln and the succession of President Andrew Johnson, the experiment came to an abrupt end in 1865, returning the land to its previous white owners.

In February 1862, a report was made to the Treasury Department which gives an indication of the territory held in the Port Royal Experiment:

An estimate of the number of plantations open to cultivation, and of the persons upon the territory protected by the forces of the United States, if only approximate to the truth, may prove convenient in providing a proper system of administration. The following islands are thus protected, and the estimated number of plantations upon each is given:

Island	Plantations
Port Royal	65
Lady's	30
Parry, including Horse	6
Cat	1
Cane	1
Datthaw	4
Coosaw	2
Morgan	2
St. Helena	50
Hilton Head	16
Pinckney	5
Bull, including Barratria	2
Daufuskie	5
Hutchinson and Fenswick	6
Total	195

Or about two hundred in all.

There are several other islands thus protected, without plantations, as Otter, Pritchard, Fripp, Hunting and Phillips. Lemon and Daw have not been explored by the agents engaged in collecting cotton. The populous island of North Edisto, lying in the direction of Charleston, and giving the name to the finest cotton, is still visited by the rebels. A part near Botany Bay Island is commanded by the guns of one of our war vessels, under which a colony of one thousand negroes sought protection, where they have been temporarily subsisted from its stores. The number has within a few days been stated to have increased to 2300.

— E. L. Pierce, The Negroes at Port Royal: Report of E. L. Pierce, Government Agent, to the Hon. Salmon P. Chase, Secretary of the Treasury, 1862

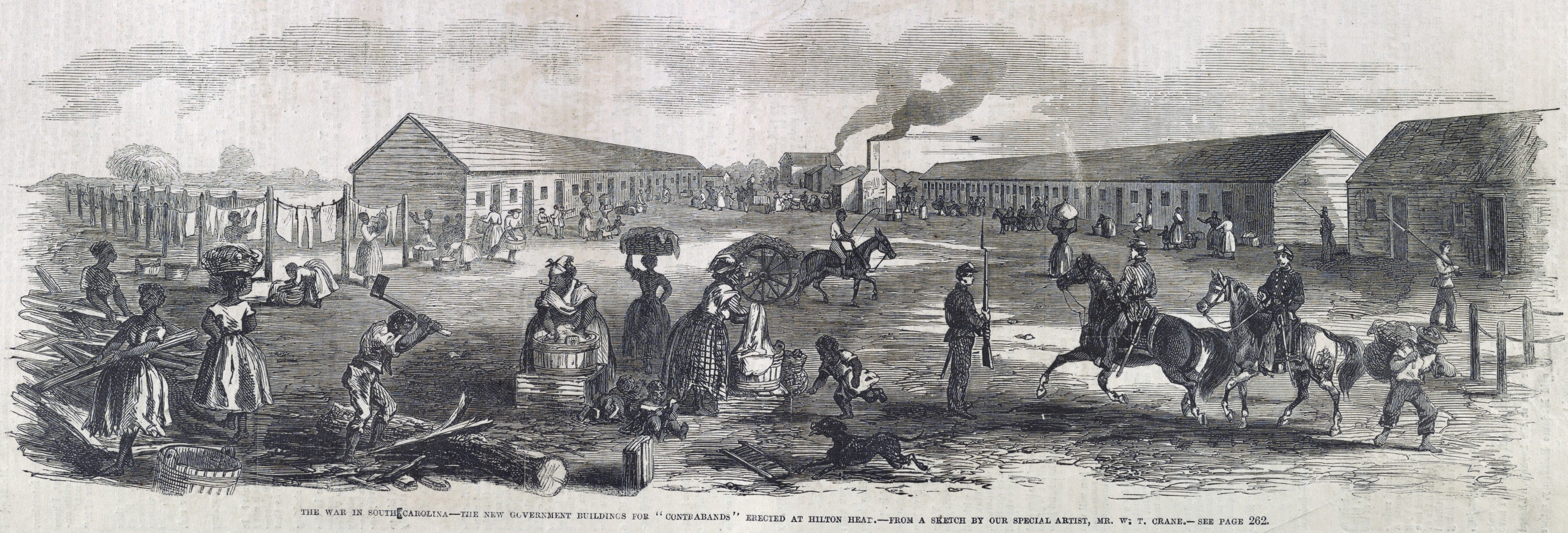
1862 illustration of government buildings for "contrabands" at Hilton Head

In the summer of 1862, Union troops protecting coastal colonies began to withdraw to reinforce Union General George B. McClellan who was engaged in the Peninsula Campaign, a series of battle between March and July. Many of the colonies were consolidated. One example was the migration of camps at Edisto Island to St. Helena Island.

== Education ==
A special education commission was established by Secretary of the Treasury Salmon P. Chase. E. L. Pierce was the government agent overseeing the experiment. The committee was looking for teachers to be sent to educate the former slaves, including as to how to govern themselves in normal society. The teachers were also responsible for intellectual, moral, and religious instruction. The Boston Educational Commission for Freedmen was established in response to a call made by Pierce as a philanthropic organization. Around the same time, the Port Royal Relief Committee of Philadelphia was formed. A New York organization united with the Boston organizations to provide relief and education for the former slaves. Many more relief organizations were established from different parts of the country. Hundreds of teachers were sent to different parts of the South.

In March 1862, more than 150 candidates applied for the special position to the special education commission, and 35 candidates were initially chosen. One of the candidates was prominent educator from Ohio John Celivergos Zachos with whom Chase was familiar as senator and governor of Ohio.

Zachos and Susan Walker traveled to Port Royal from Ohio. The Boston and New York Education Commissions sent Zachos to prove that the former slaves could be educated. Zachos was on Parris Island in March 1862, in command of 400 freed slaves on a plantation. He spent 16 months at Parris Island, taking on many roles, including army surgeon, teacher, and storekeeper. He was also in charge of the military stronghold under General Rufus Saxton.

Zachos tried to teach the former slaves and studied their ability to learn. He realized that older slaves had difficulties because of the years of psychological abuse and torture. Zachos found it easier to educate younger people. Towards the end of 1863, Zachos traveled back to Boston. In early 1864, Zachos assembled a group of Irish and German uneducated immigrants, both male and female. The test subjects did not speak or read English.

Zachos assembled a curriculum to instruct the test subjects based on the needs of the former slaves and their ability to learn. Early on, he did not have a book and so he used charts and a chalkboard. The pupils received their first book in March 1864 to receive the first book, The Phonic Primer and Reader. The experiment concluded that the technique created during his time at Port Royal was effective enough to teach adults. It was a simple method that used a unique phonic teaching method of teaching English reading by the sounds of letters. The research was presented to the Boston and New York Education Commissions and published in the Journal of The Massachusetts Teachers Association. After his work, Chase gave Zachos an extraordinary recommendation.

The Port Royal Experiment initiated a systematic outcry for the education of the freed slaves. Numerous organizations were established and continued educating the freed people. On March 3, 1865, roughly two months before the end of the Civil War, the Freedmen's Bureau was established. Within the next five years, it had established 4,239 schools, employed 9,307 teachers, and instructed 247,333 students. The higher education of African Americans was the bureau's responsibility. In many instances there was opposition among the white people of the South; moreover, in one state, the opposition became widely organized. At the same time, many former slave masters reportedly assisted in establishing schools for the slaves and became their teachers.

On May 16, 1866, a convention was held in Cleveland, Ohio, and formed the American Freedman's Union Commission. The Boston Educational Commission became the New England Branch, and the New York National Freedmen's Relief Association became the New York Branch. Many other such philanthropic organizations also merged into different branches of the American Freedman's Union Commission with the intention of the proliferation of the education of African-Americans.

== See also ==
- Hurricane Plantation, Davis Bend, Mississippi
- Penn Center (Saint Helena Island, South Carolina)

== Bibliography ==
- Faragher, John Mack, ed. (1998). The American Heritage Encyclopedia of American History. New York: Henry Holt & Co. ISBN 9780805044386. OCLC 36900841.
- Foner, Eric (2001). "The Civil War and the Story of American Freedom". Art Institute of Chicago Museum Studies, 27(1: Terrain of Freedom: American Art and the Civil War): pp. 8–101. doi:10.2307/4102836. JSTOR 4102836.
- Ochiai, Akiko (March 2001). "The Port Royal Experiment Revisited: Northern Visions of Reconstruction and the Land Question". The New England Quarterly. 74(1):94–117. doi:10.2307/3185461. JSTOR 3185461.
- Parten, Bennett. Somewhere Toward Freedom: Sherman's March and the Story of America's Largest Emancipation. Simon & Schuster, 2025. ISBN 9781668034682
- Rose, Willie Lee Nichols (1999) [1964]. Rehearsal for Reconstruction: The Port Royal Experiment (reprint). Athens, GA: University of Georgia Press. ISBN 9780820320618. OCLC 38842012. Original edition.
