= John Celivergos Zachos =

Greek-American physician and educator (1820–1898)

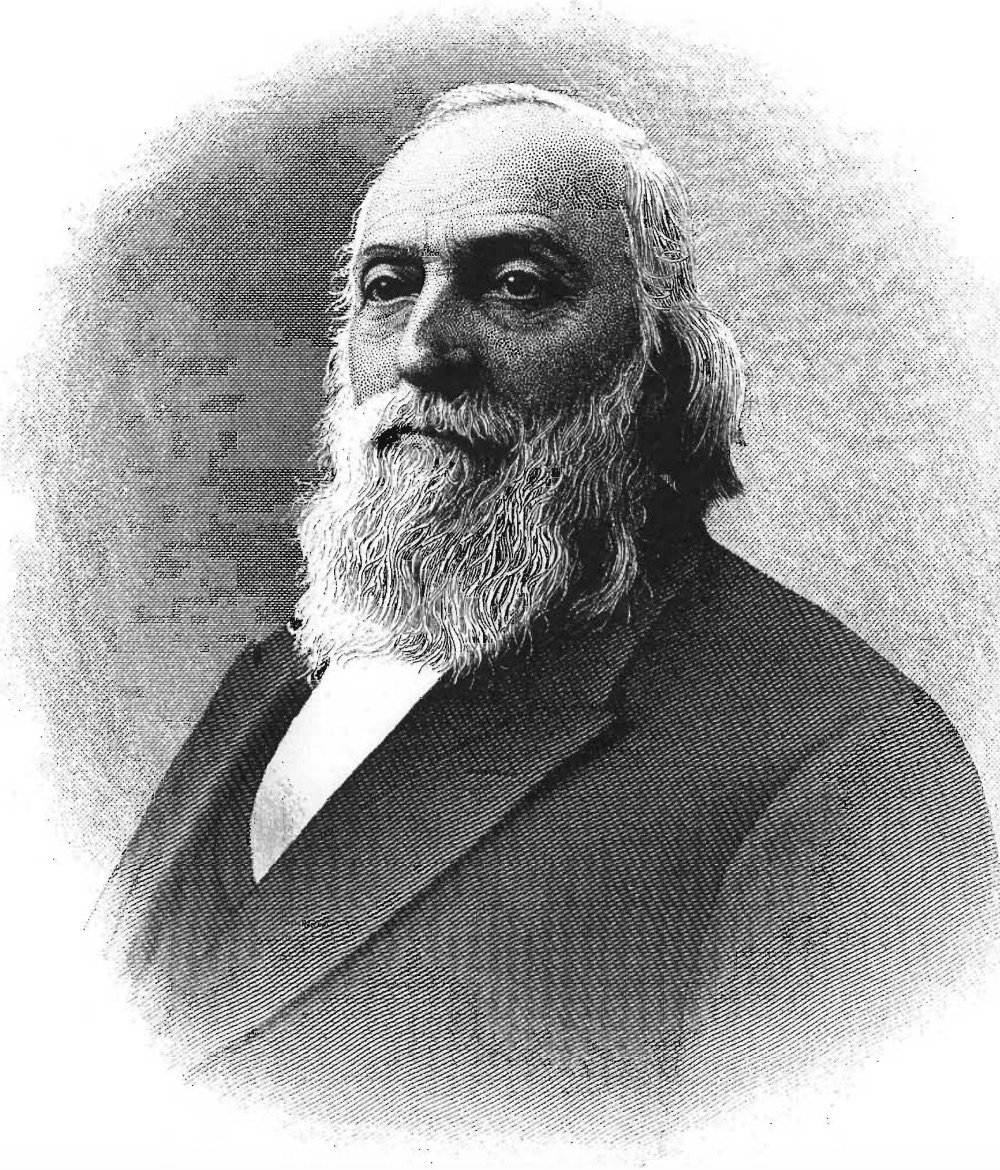
- Born: December 20, 1820; Constantinople, Ottoman Empire (modern-day Istanbul, Turkey)
- Died: March 20, 1898 (aged 77); New York City
- Resting place: Newton Cemetery, Newton, Massachusetts
- Other name: Cadmus
- Education: Kenyon College
- Occupations: Physician; Professor; Elocutionist; Author; Inventor
- Known for: Public speech Educational theory Port Royal Experiment; Stenotype
- Spouse: Harriet Tompkins Canfield Zachos (m. 1849–1896)
- Children: Ainsworth Yeatman Zachos; Catharine E. Zachos; Mary Helena Zachos; Margaret Altona Zachos; Elizabeth Zachos; Robert H. Zachos
- Military career
- Allegiance: United States
- Branch: United States Army/Union Army
- Position: Acting Surgeon
- Unit: Army Medical Department
- Conflicts: American Civil War

Signature
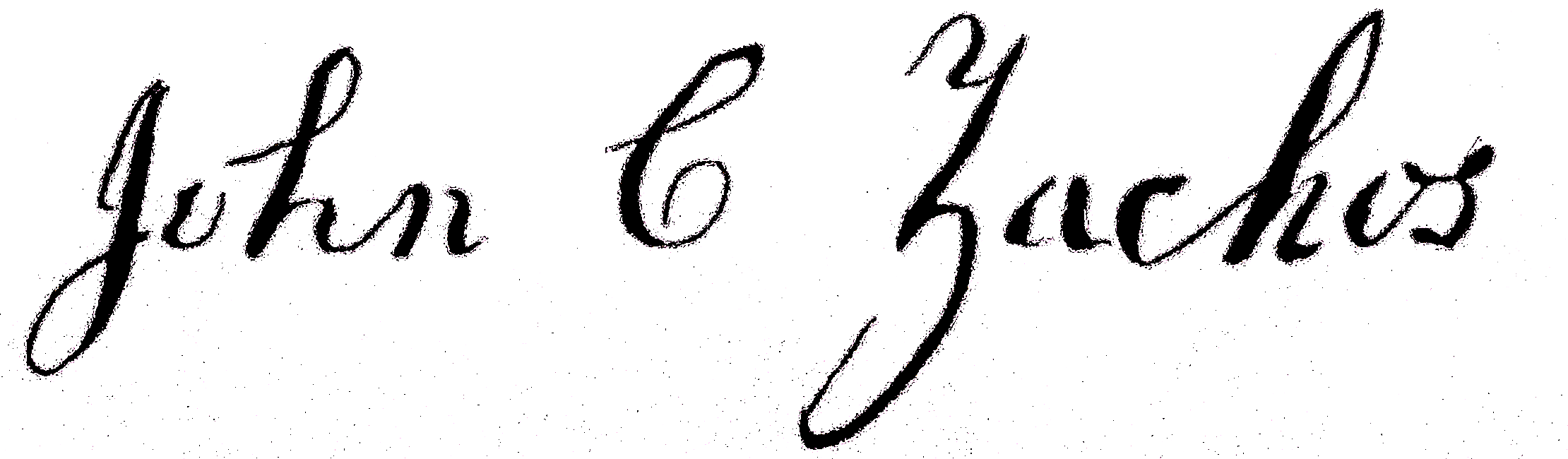

John Celivergos Zachos (Greek: Ιωάννης Καλίβεργος Ζάχος; December 20, 1820 – March 20, 1898) was a Greek-American physician, literary scholar, elocutionist, author, lecturer, inventor, and educational pioneer. He was an early proponent of equal education rights for African Americans and women. During the American Civil War, he was the superintendent at Port Royal and a main figure in the Port Royal Experiment. In his book, Phonic Primer and Reader he developed a special system to educate freed slaves. He advocated and expanded the oratory systems of François Delsarte and James Rush.

He was born in Constantinople (modern-day Istanbul) to Greek parents. Both his parents participated in the Greek War of Independence and migrated to Greece after the outbreak of war. His father died during the war and he was given to Samuel Gridley Howe by his mother. He was a young refugee traveling to the United States of America. In America, he was educated at Mount Pleasant Classical Institute and one of his teachers included Gregory Anthony Perdicaris. At the academy, he also met Chauncey Colton whom he followed around the country to different educational institutions; one was outside of Philadelphia and the latter was Kenyon College in Gambier, Ohio. Zachos attended Kenyon College and graduated with honors and also obtained a medical degree but did not practice medicine because of his love for literature and teaching. He became an Army surgeon during the American Civil War serving primarily at Port Royal. Zachos became a Unitarian Minister, briefly taught at Cornell, and finally settled in New York City where he was the curator of the library at Cooper Union and a professor at the institution until his death.

He was the fourth honorary member of the National Association of Elocutionists. Zachos was one of the founders of the Beta Theta Pi Society, the Literary Club of Cincinnati, and the Ohio Society of New York. He developed the Zachos Method which is outlined in his book The New American Speaker. The technique uses an acting method for public speech and the book features a large assortment of Shakespearean monologues. As an inventor, he invented the stenotype. His nephew George Canfield Blickensderfer later invented the blickensderfer typewriter. Zachos's daughter Helena Zachos continued his work as a prominent elocutionist. The Helena Zachos Award at Wells College was named after her. He died in New York City at 77 years old.

== Early life ==
Zachos was born in Constantinople, the capital of the Ottoman Empire. His parents were Nicholas and Euphrosyne Zachos. They were from Athens. Nicholas Zachos was a general in the Greek army during the Greek War of Independence, where he was killed in battle in 1824.

Samuel Gridley Howe an American surgeon and Philhellene was also fighting for Greek independence. He brought John Celivergos Zachos along with other young Greek people back to the United States to educate them.

Namely traveling with Zachos and Howe was a young refugee who survived the Chios massacre named Christophoros Castanes. In 1851, he wrote a book on his travels called The Greek Exile, Or, a Narrative of the Captivity and Escape of Christophorus Plato Castanis. This book includes John C. Zachos and other Greek children.

== Education and marriage ==
In 1830, Zachos was in the United States. He was placed in Mount Pleasant Classical Institute in Amherst, Massachusetts with Christophorus P. Castanis and other Greek children. Their instructors were Gregory Anthony Perdicaris and Petros Mengous and the assistant principal and founder was Chauncey Colton D. D. Zachos later traveled to an Episcopalian institution twenty miles north of Philadelphia. Bristol Manual Labor College, Dr Colton was the founder and President it combined manual labor and study. He remained there from 1833 to 1836.

By 1837 Zachos again followed Dr. Colton to Kenyon College in Gambier, Ohio. Chauncey Colton D. D. took a position as Professor of Homiletics at the institution. Zachos's classmates included Rutherford B. Hayes and Stanley Matthews. He graduated from the institution in 1840 with honors. Zachos gave two commencement speeches one was in Classical Greek and the other was in English. As a young adult, he was noted for fine speaking, and he won prizes whenever he competed. He was the founder of the Society of Kenyon College.

By now, Zachos and Matthews were close friends and the two lived together in Cincinnati, Matthews's hometown. Matthews pursued a law degree under Salmon P. Chase and Zachos was a teacher, while he continued a graduate Degree at Kenyon College. Colton also traveled to Cincinnati. He founded a few schools where Professor Zachos also taught.

By 1843, Zachos finished his second degree from Kenyon College. By now Zachos enrolled in Medical School under the prominent Dr. Reuben D. Mussey where he continued his studies for three years. By the late 1840s, Zachos decide not to practice medicine due to his love for teaching and literature.

Zachos, Stanley Matthews, Ainsworth Rand Spofford, and nine others founded the Literary Club of Cincinnati in 1849. One year later Rutherford B. Hayes became a member. Other prominent members included William Howard Taft and notable club guests Ralph Waldo Emerson, Booker T. Washington, Mark Twain, and Robert Frost.

He married Harriet Tompkins Canfield Zachos on July 26, 1849. Harriet Tompkins was born on January 15, 1824, to George Washington Canfield and Catherine A Clark. Harriet's second cousin John Caldwell Canfield married Ella Todd, Abraham Lincoln's niece. Harriet Canfield and John Zachos had six children born between 1850 and 1865. His daughter Mary Helena Zachos became an American college professor and elocutionist. His son Ainsworth was named after close friend and abolitionist Ainsworth Rand Spofford.

== Middle years ==
By 1850, Zachos was the co-owner and principal of the Cincinnati Female Seminary on the southeast corner of Ninth and Walnut. The school was founded by Miss Margaret Coxe in 1843. Together they were also co-principals of Cooper Female Institute in Dayton Ohio.

Zachos was very active in Ohio during the 1850s. He was involved with the Ohio State Teachers Association and created the Association for Advancement of Female Education. Zachos was also the editor of the Ohio Journal of Education.

During the early 1850s Zachos wrote several books: The New American Speaker and Introductory Lessons in Reading and Elocution.

Educator Horace Mann, a fellow Bostonian and close friend to Samuel Gridley Howe, took a position at Antioch College in Yellow Springs, Ohio. Mann invited Zachos to the college. Zachos became a principal of the preparatory school in 1854 but remained at the post for three years because Mann could not secure his tenure. At Antioch College, Zachos read Shakespeare and lectured courses on the English Poets. During his time at the institution, Zachos stayed busy traveling around Ohio with his many other organizations.

By 1857, Zachos moved back to Cincinnati. He took random teaching jobs and wrote four more books before the onset of the Civil War. The Primary School Speaker, The High School Speaker, The Analytic and Phonetic Word Book and Analytic Elocution. At this point, Zachos was perfecting public speech and education.

== American Civil War ==
At the onset of the Civil War, Zachos was summoned by close friend Salmon P. Chase to go to Port Royal. He was formally sent by the Boston and New York Education Commissions to prove that former slaves could be educated. On March 13, 1862, Zachos was on Parris Island in command of 400 freed slaves on a plantation. Zachos spent a total of 16 months at Parris Island. Zachos took on many roles during this time, he was an Army Surgeon, Teacher, Store Keeper. The military stronghold was supervised by Zachos under General Rufus Saxton. He is noted for writing and reciting poetry to the freed slaves.

Ye sons of burning Afric's soil,
Lift up your hands of hardened toil
Your shouts from every hill recoil

Today you are free

Zachos left Parris Island towards the end of 1863 to conclude the experiment. While he was at Port Royal he studied the difficulties former slaves encountered with learning how to read. Namely, older slaves had a hard time due to years of torture and psychological abuse.

Zachos traveled back to Boston. He lived in the neighborhood where he grew up and where Samuel Gridley Howe still maintained a residence. During the beginning of 1864, Zachos assembled a group of uneducated immigrants, both male and female. The test subjects did not speak or read English.

Zachos, with the knowledge he acquired from the former slaves, put together a curriculum to instruct the test subjects. Because he did not have a book he used charts and the chalkboard. The students had to wait until March 1864 to receive the first book, which had an extremely long title The Phonic Primer and Reader, A National Method of Teaching Reading by the Sounds of the Letters without altering the Orthography. Designed Chiefly for the Use of Night-Schools Where Adults are Taught, and for the Myriads of Freed Men and Women, Whose First Rush from the Prison-House of Slavery is to the Gates of the Temple of Knowledge. The test concluded that the new technique he created during his time at Port Royal was effective enough to teach adults. It was a simple teaching method. The method employed a unique phonic education technique of teaching English reading by sounds of letters. That same year an official book was published to educate the former adult slaves. Phonic Primer and Reader. Thus was coined the phrase: The Port Royal Experiment. After his work Salmon P. Chase gave Zachos an extraordinary recommendation.

== Career and later life ==
Zachos continued living in Boston for another two years. He became a Unitarian Minister. He gave twelve lectures at the Lowell Institute. Both Samuel Gridley Howe and Zachos departed Boston at around the same time. Samuel Gridley Howe traveled back to Greece to carry relief to the Cretan refugees and Zachos moved to Meadville Lombard Theological School.

In May 1866, he became the Professor of Sacred Rhetoric. While at the Theological School, he established another Literary Society. American author, historian, and Unitarian minister Edward Everett Hale spoke very highly of John C. Zachos.

Historian Earl Morse Wilbur describes Zachos's call to minister at the Independent Congregational Church (Unitarian) of Meadville (Pennsylvania), writing: "A call was given, January 28, 1866, to the Rev. John Celivergos Zachos of West Newton, Mass. He accepted the call and began his ministry here at the beginning of May, at a salary of $1500, in addition to the rents of the minister's house, and with four weeks' annual vacation." Wilbur wrote further:

Something of the schoolmaster was apparent in his style of preaching. He was a versatile man, with an uncommonly wide range of interests; a Greek in temperament as well as by birth, fond of abstract themes, and inclined to consider subjects rather from the philosophical or speculative than from the practical side. Yet, though fluent in language, he was not considered an especially strong preacher, nor yet a superior pastor. In addition to the work of his ministry, he was professor of Sacred Rhetoric and Oratory in the Theological School during the two years of his residence here and continued to hold this office during the year after his departure, returning to give lectures. To him, it is said, is due the suggestion that led to the forming of the Meadville Literary Union in December 1866. Mr. Zachos resigned in July 1868 and left Meadville at the beginning of October in order to accept a call to the church at Ithaca, N.Y. His departure was generally lamented, as the loss of a faithful minister who was ready to devote himself to every good cause, and who had endeared himself to all classes by his affable manner and his kindness of heart.

By 1868 Zachos moved to Ithaca, New York to the Ithaca Chapter of the Theological Seminary. He remained associated with the former institution until 1871. While at Ithaca Zachos also lectured and taught classes at the newly founded Cornell University.

In 1871, now 51 he moved to New York City where he would stay until the time of his death. Peter Cooper and John C. Zachos became good friends. Zachos influenced the foundation of Cooper Union. He taught literature and public speech. In 1876, he was Peter Cooper's first biographer. He was a Professor and Library Curator at Cooper Union.

Zachos invented a medical device called an Improvement to Abdominal & Spinal Supporters. A patent was filed on July 16, 1872. The No. was 129202. The device was also patented in England.

Due to his legendary reputation in the Civil War as an Army Surgeon, Zachos also became medical advisor to the Butler Health Lift. He collaborated with David Butler the inventor of exercise equipment. Together, they wrote instructional books on health and exercise and the benefits of using the equipment.

On December 24, 1875, he filed patent number 175892 for typewriters and phenotypic notation applications. The machine was a stenotype used for printing legible English text at a high speed. He obtained 10,000 dollars in investment capital for his invention. He continued his advancement of oratory for the next two decades.

He was a proponent of the Delsarte System of Oratory founded by François Delsarte. He also advocated the James Rush classic, The Philosophy of the Human Voice. James Rush was the son of Benjamin Rush.

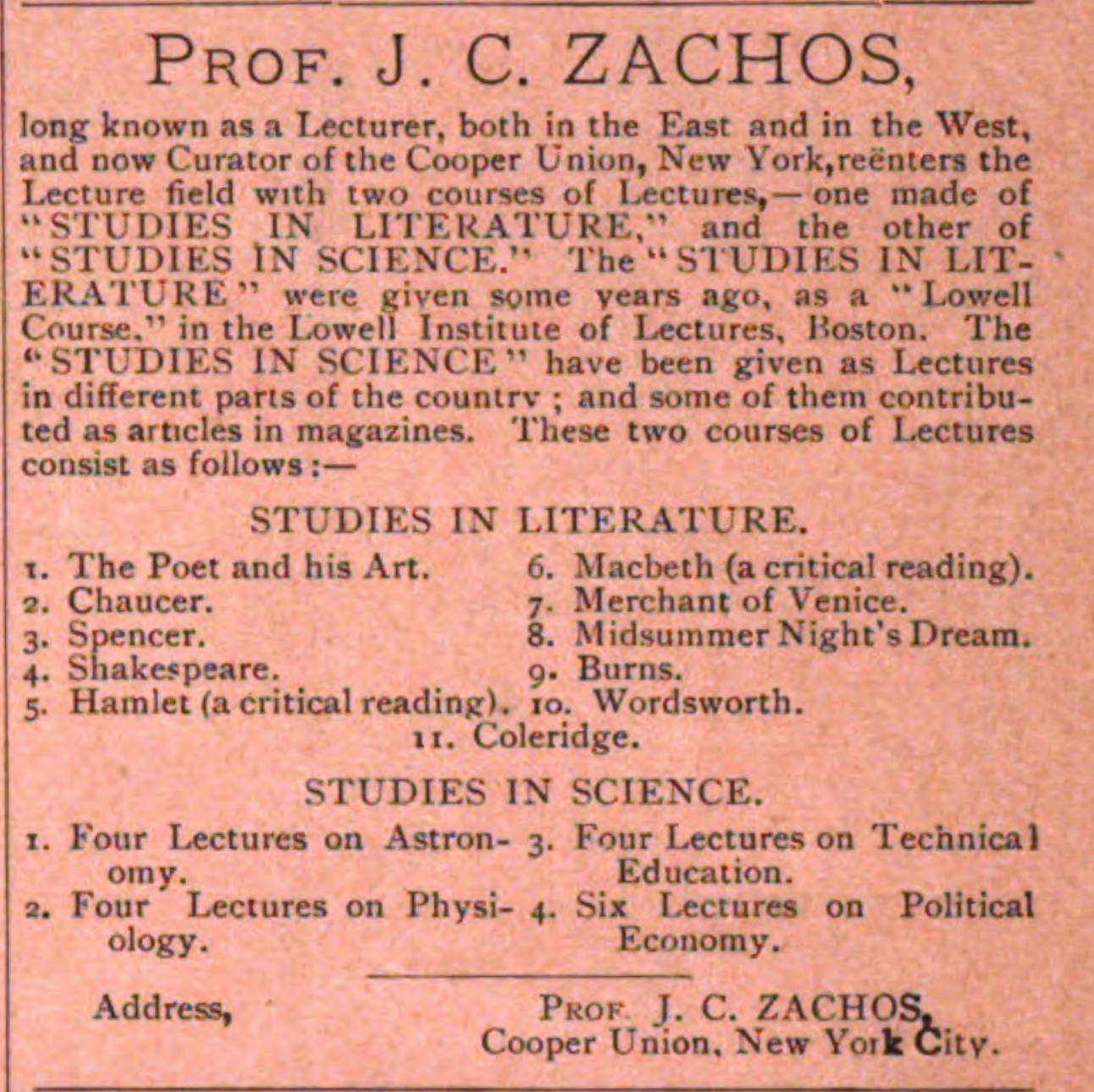
Advertisement

Zachos's lectures were very popular at Cooper Union. Namely, on Tuesdays and Saturdays, the crowd would exceed 100 to 200 people. Peter Cooper told William Cullen Bryant to personally observe Professor Zachos's lecture. In "The Letters of William Cullen Bryant" Bryant called Zachos an oratory genius. Due to his poetry lectures he also gained the recognition of Ralph Waldo Emerson and James Russell Lowell.

His writing was not confined to literature. Zachos also wrote about philosophy, mathematics, science, metaphysics, and other scientific branches. Under the pseudonym "Cadmus" Dr. Zachos wrote about financial and economic subjects that were published in various New York City publications.

On January 7, 1896, Harriet Tompkins Zachos died. Roughly two years later on March 20, 1898, John Celivergos Zachos died. His funeral was held at the Church of the Messiah (Manhattan). Among the many in attendance were his pallbearers S. Packard, Augustus D. Juilliard Former NYC mayor William Lafayette Strong and Union army brevet brigadier general Henry Lawrence Burnett. At the time of his death, his residence was 113 West 84th Street New York City.

== Zachos Method ==
Zachos featured his elocutionary technique in his book The New American Speaker. The intention of the elocutionary method was to assist public speakers, politicians, actors, and lecturers in their presentation of public speech. His elocutionary acting method was broken into five parts: articulation, accent, pronunciation, expression, and gesture. The book featured selected literary works which were treated as monologues also referred to as dialogues during that era. The monologues were introduced by acting style. The first section began with earnest declamation monologues followed by declamation vehement invective monologues. The sections following included: dramatic and descriptive, soliloquy and meditation, wit-humor-burlesque, while the final section featured works for serious and comic acting.

The featured literary works used in his books were taken from various different authors, poets, and playwrights. A huge assortment of the works of William Shakespeare were featured. The purpose of the sections were to utilize acting methods for public speech. The selected works resembled the specific acting method chosen by Zachos for example most of the serious and comic acting sections featured the works of William Shakespeare. One example was The Greeks Before Troy. The method required the actor to follow the method of articulation, accent, pronunciation, expression, and gesture in either a serious or comical technique for the selected literary work.

== Literary works ==
Books and articles authored by John Celivergos Zachos
Date	Title
1851	New American Speaker
1852	Introductory Lessons in Reading and Elocution
1858	The Primary School Speaker
1858	The High School Speaker
1859	The Analytic and Phonetic Word Book
1860	Analytic Elocution
1864	The Phonic Primer and Reader A National Method of teaching Reading by the Sounds of the Letters without altering the Orthography. Designed Chiefly for the Use of Night-Schools Where Adults are Taught, and for the Myriads of Freed Men and Women, Whose First Rush from the Prison-House of Slavery is to the Gates of the Temple of Knowledge
1864	Phonic Primer and Reader
1870	Lectures and Practical Lessons in the Three Departments of English Literature, Elocution, and Composition
1876	A Sketch of the Life and Opinions of Mr. Peter Cooper
1877	The Political and Financial Opinions of Peter Cooper Edited by J.C. Zachos
1878	An Address to the Merchants and Professional Men of the Country, without Respect to Parties
1881	The Fiscal Problem of All Civilized Nations

== See also ==
- George Colvocoresses
- Garafilia Mohalbi
- Greek Slave Movement

== Bibliography ==
- Moskos, Peter C. (2017). Greek Americans: Struggle and Success. New Brunswick, New Jersey: Routeledge. ISBN 9781351516693.
- Canfield, Fredreick A. (1897). A History of Thomas Canfield and of Matthew Camfield with A Genealogy of their Descendants in New Jersey. The Title Morehouse & Taylor Press, New Haven Conn.
- Hanna, John Calvin (1897). Beta Theta Pi Biography of John C. Zachos. New York, New York: Beta Theta Pi.
- Hanna, John Calvin (1899). Catalogue of Beta Theta Pi: In the Sixtieth Year of the Fraternity. NY, NY: Beta Theta Pi Publishing.
- Topping, Eva Catafygiotu (Spring 1976). "John Zachos: Cincinnatian from Constantinople" (PDF). The Cincinnati Historical Society Bulletin. 34 (1). Cincinnati OH. Archived from the original (PDF) on April 8, 2023.
- Zachos, John C. (1865). "The Phonic Text". The Massachusetts Teacher a Journal of School Education. 18. Boston MA. Archived from the original on June 12, 2023.
- Gibson, John Westby (1887). The Bibliography of Shorthand. London, UK: Isaac Pitman & Sons.
- Zachos, John C. (1870). Lectures and Practical Lessons in the Three Departments of English Literature, Elocution, and Composition. Boston MA.: Rand, Avery, & FRYE. Archived from the original on June 12, 2023.
- Clarke, Isaac Edwards (1897). Art and Industry: Industrial and technical training in voluntary associations and endowed institutions. Washington D.C: United States Office of Education.
- Huntington, D. L. (1896). Index Catalogue of the Library of the Surgeon General's Office United Army Second Series Vol 1 US Patent 129202. Washington, D.C.: Washington Government Printing Press.
- Thomas formerly (De la Peña), Carolyn (2003). The Body Electric How Strange Machines Built the Modern American. New York, NY: New York University Press. ISBN 9780814719831.
- Spottiswoode, William; Eyre, George E. (1876). The Commissioners of Patents US Patent 175892. London, UK: Office of Commissioners of Patents.
- Bryant, William Cullen (2019). The Letters of William Cullen Bryant Volume VI 1872–1878: Letter 2250. New York, NY: Fordham University Press. ISBN 9780823287321.
- Leypoldt, F. (1898). "John C. Zachos". W.M. Wood & CO. Publishers. 53 (1365). New York, NY.
- Werner, Edgar S. (1898). Werner's Magazine, Volume 21. 108 East 16th Street, New York, New York: Sanford & Kenworthy Printers.
- Ash, Stephen V. (2008). Firebrand of Liberty: The Story of Two Black Regiments That Changed the Course of the Civil War. New York, New York: W.W. Norton Company Inc. ISBN 9780393069907.
- Kastanes, Christophoros P. (1851). The Greek Exile, Or, a Narrative of the Captivity and Escape of Christophorus Plato Castanis. Philadelphia, PA.: Lippincott, Grambo and Co.
- Kaloudis, George (2018). Modern Greece and the Diaspora Greeks in the United States. Rowman & Littlefield Publishing Group Inc. Maryland. ISBN 9780393069907.
- Zachos, John C. (1859). The New American Speaker. New York, NY: S. A. ROLLO & Co.
- Leber, George (2020). "History of the Order of AHEPA 1922-1972". Tenafly, NJ: Order of Ahepa. Archived from the original on April 10, 2023.
