= Sophie Aberle =

American anthropologist, physician and nutritionist (1896–1996)

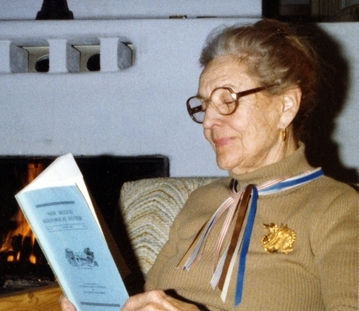
- Aberle in her New Mexico home, 1982
- Born: Sophie Bledsoe Herrick; July 10, 1896; Schenectady, New York, U.S.
- Died: October 1, 1996 (aged 100); Albuquerque, New Mexico, U.S.
- Occupations: Anthropologist, physician, and nutritionist
- Known for: Work with Pueblo people

Sophie Bledsoe Aberle (née Herrick; July 10, 1896 – October 1, 1996) was an American anthropologist, physician and nutritionist known for her work with Pueblo people. She was one of two women first appointed to the National Science Board.

== Early life and education ==
Sophie Bledsoe Herrick was born in 1896 to Albert and Clara S. Herrick in Schenectady, New York. Her paternal grandmother and namesake was the writer Sophia Bledsoe Herrick. Sophie was educated at home and had a brief marriage at age 21 to a man surnamed Aberle, which surname she chose to keep. She began attending University of California, Berkeley but switched to Stanford University, earning a bachelor's degree in 1923, a master's degree in 1925, and a Ph.D. in genetics in 1927. She then attended medical school, earning an M.D. from Yale University in 1930. While a student, she worked as an assistant histologist, embryologist, and neurologist, and as an anthropology instructor.

== Career and research ==
Though she began her career with a 4-year stint as an instructor at Yale, Aberle spent most of her career working in Native American areas. She was employed by the Bureau of Indian Affairs from 1935 to 1944, then took a position with National Research Council until 1949, and from 1949 to 1954 at the University of New Mexico. In 1948, her first major book was published, which placed Aberle as a strong proponent of Pueblo land rights.

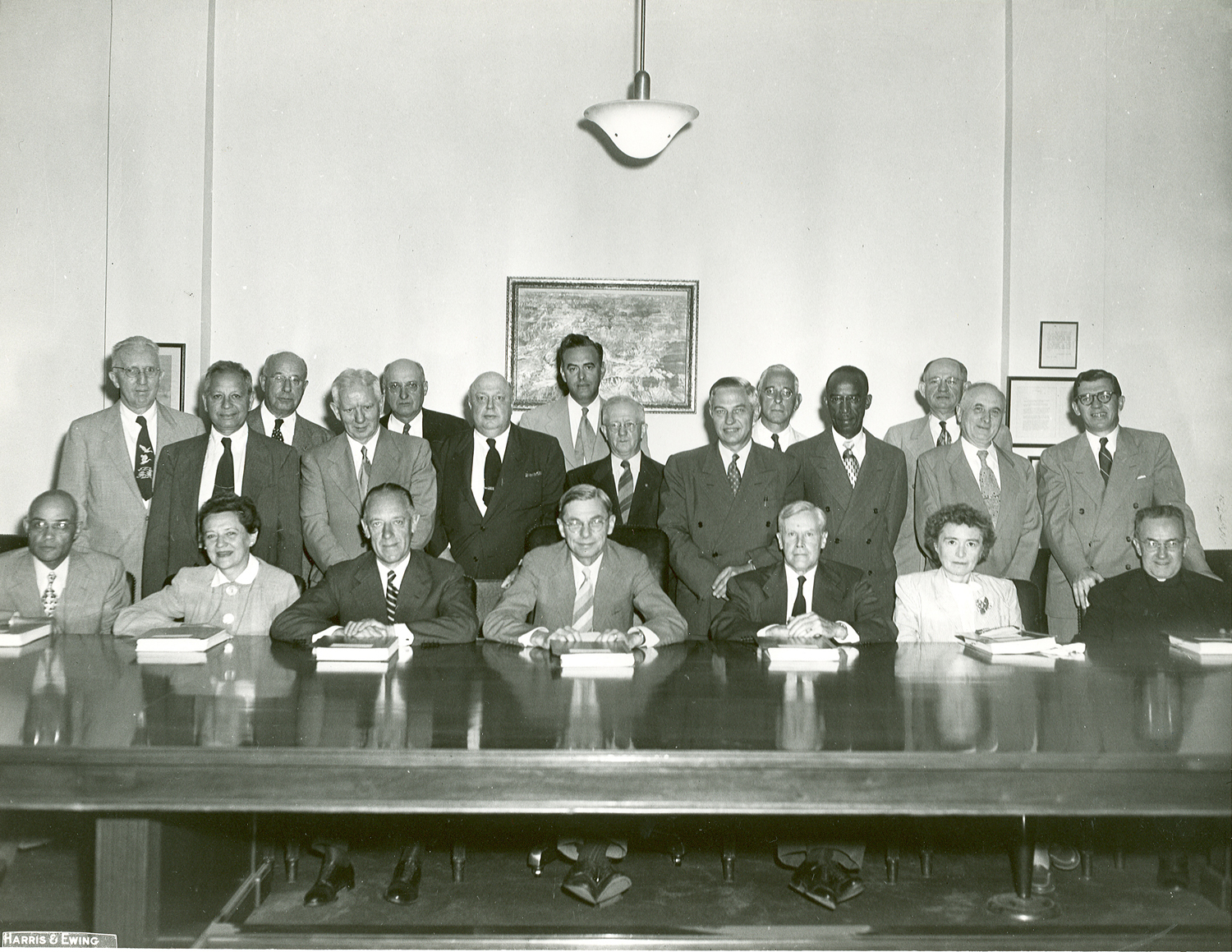
National Science Board Members, July 1951 (Aberle is second from the left, first row)

She and Gerty Cori were the first women appointed to the National Science Board by President Harry Truman in 1951. Aberle remained a member until 1957. She worked for the Bernalillo County Indian Hospital as its chief nutritionist until 1966 when she returned to the University of New Mexico as a professor of psychiatry, a position she maintained until her 1970 retirement.

=== Professional service ===
Aberle spent much of her career working on committees for land allocation and health. She was a member of the upper Rio Grande drainage basin committee, the health committee of the All Indian Pueblo Council, the New Mexico Nutrition Committee, the White House Conference on Children in Democracy, the Committee of Maternal and Infant Mortality, Planned Parenthood, and was the chair of the board of directors for the Southwest Field Training School for Federal Service and the Commission on Rights, Liberties, and Responsibilities of American Indians.

== Professional memberships ==
- American Association for the Advancement of Science
- American Anthropological Association
- American Medical Association

== Works ==
- 1948: The Pueblo Indians of New Mexico, Their Land, Economy and Civil Organization, American Anthropologist 48 via Internet Archive
- 1966: (with William A. Brophy) The Indian: America's Unfinished Business, Report of the Commission on the Rights, Liberties, and Responsibilities of the American Indian, University of Oklahoma Press
