= Margaret Coxe =

American writer and educator

- Born: 1805; Burlington, New Jersey
- Died: September 14, 1855 (aged 49–50)
- Occupations: School owner, principal, teacher, writer
- Notable work: The Young Lady's Companion, Wonders of the Deep, and Botany of the Scriptures

Margaret Coxe (1805–1855) was an American writer and educator. Coxe founded the Cincinnati Female Seminary in 1843. Seven years later, John Zachos became a co-owner and principal of the school. In 1851, they became co-owners and principals of the Cooper Female Institute in Dayton, Ohio. Coxe wrote several books, including The Young Lady's Companion and Claims of the Country on American Females.

== Early life ==
Margaret Coxe, the daughter of William Coxe, Esq. and Rachel Smith, was born in Burlington, New Jersey in 1805. Rachel was the daughter and only heir to her father, Richard Smith's estate. William and Rachel had eight children, Maria, Margaret, Anne, Harriet, Emily, William Smith, Richard Smith and Elizabeth.

Margaret studied at home, which had a good library. Coxe had a love of learning, was disciplined in her studies, and was religious.

Her sister Harriet was married Albert Taylor Bledsoe. Coxe took care of their daughter Sophia when she lived in Cincinnati, while Coxe's sister and brother-in-law sought medical care for Harriet in several cities in the United States.

== Career ==
In 1843, Coxe founded the Cincinnati Female Seminary. In 1850, John Zachos, became Coxe's co-owner and its principal. The school had ten teachers, with a 1 to 12 ratio of teachers to students. In 1851, Coxe and Zachos where both owners and principals at the Cooper Female Institute in Dayton, Ohio.

She has written The Young Lady's Companion, Wonders of the Deep, and Botany of the Scriptures. Her book Claims of the Country on American Females was published in 1842. In 1845, her book Floral Emblems; or, Moral Sketches from Flowers was published.

== Death ==
Coxe died at the University of Virginia in Charlottesville on September 14, 1855.
