= Blickensderfer typewriter =

Typewriter invented by George Canfield Blickensderfer

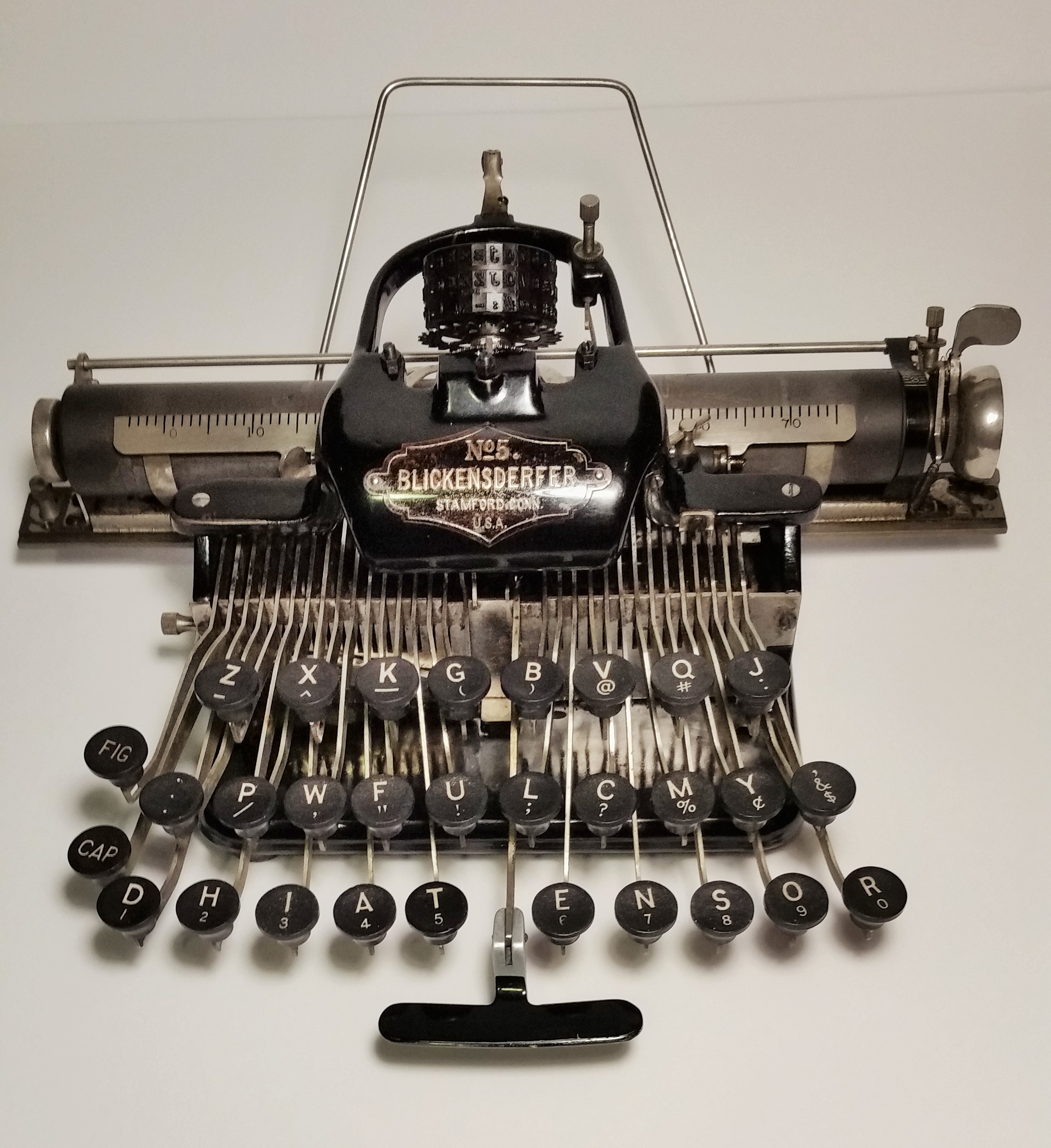
Example of an early Blickensderfer No.5 typewriter, dated 1902

The Blickensderfer typewriter was invented by George Canfield Blickensderfer (1850–1917) and patented on April 12, 1892. Blickensderfer was a nephew of John Celivergos Zachos, the inventor of the stenotype. Two models, Model 1 and Model 5, were unveiled to the public at the 1893 World's Columbian Exposition in Chicago. The Model 5 was a stripped-down version of the bigger, more complex Model 1. These machines were intended to compete with larger Remington, Hammond and Yost typewriters, and were the first truly portable, full-keyboard typewriters. The design also enabled the typist to see the typed work, at a time when most typewriters were understrike machines that concealed the writing. (Note: With understrike typewriters such as the Sholes and Glidden, depressing a key caused a typebar to rise from underneath the paper, pressing the paper upwards against the ribbon and thus printing an inked character.) When Blickensderfer unveiled his small Model 5, its compactness and novel features attracted huge crowds and many orders.

== History ==
The Blickensderfer typewriters were initially manufactured in a rented factory on Garden Street in Stamford, Connecticut. By 1896, due to strong foreign demand in particular for his machines, Blickensderfer opened a new and modern factory on Atlantic Street in Stamford. According to an article published by the Stamford Historical Society, "Blickensderfer's typewriter ... became the world's best seller, and the company became one of the world's largest typewriter manufacturers." The factory employed about 200 people and produced about 10,000 typewriters per year at its peak (1903-1907) until the factory closed in 1919. The first commercially successful model was the No. 5, which sold for $35, compared to the benchmark machines of the day which cost $100 or more. Each new Model 5 came in a simple wooden carrying case with an extra typewheel, a dozen ink rolls and a tool kit.

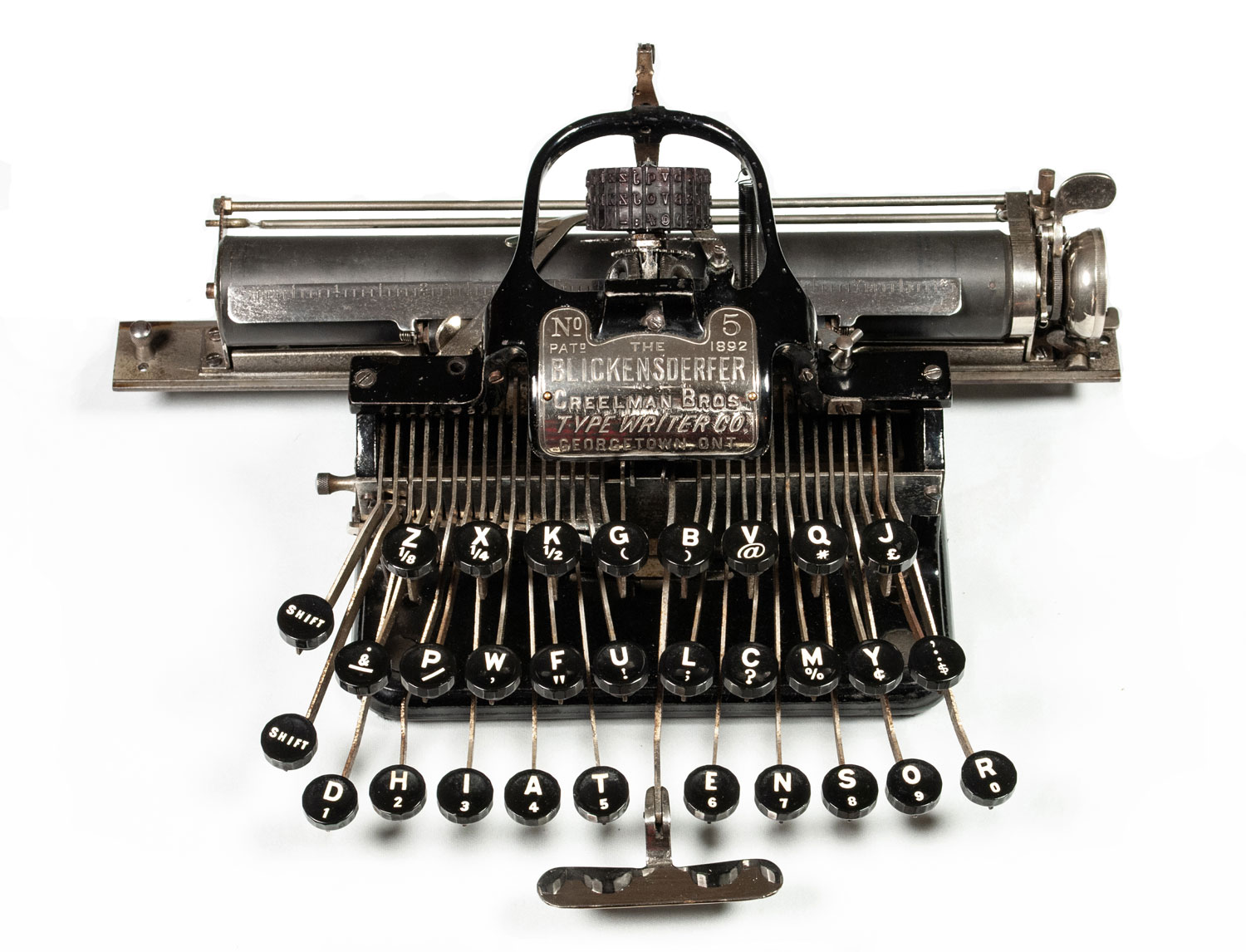
Creelman Brothers Blickensderfer 5 typewriter, circa 1895

Blickensderfer typewriters were sold in France under the Dactyle name. The machines were sold in Canada by the Creelman Brothers Company of Georgetown, Ontario. They were also sold and marketed in Great Britain, Germany, New Zealand and Russia. The keyboards and type wheels were available for numerous languages, including French, Spanish, German and Polish. Some machines, called the Oriental, were adapted so the carriage moved from left to right, to accommodate Hebrew and Arabic languages.

The company's European business declined with the onset of World War I, and production and sales were particularly hard hit when the United States joined the war in 1917. As part of the war effort Blickensderfer converted much of his factory to produce munitions for the war, including a machine gun belt feed for the French government and 50 caliber machine gun mounts for aircraft.

George Blickensderfer died on August 15, 1917, after a short illness. With the chief engineer and designer gone, his company could not continue, and the heirs sold it in 1919. After several unsuccessful years under different ownership, the Remington Typewriter Company acquired the assets, including tools, parts, drawings and intellectual rights, from the bankrupt L.R. Roberts Company in 1926. Remington attempted to introduce a modified Blickensderfer 5 called the Rem-Blick to the market, but by the end of 1928 the model was discontinued.

== Design ==
The Blickensderfer typewriter dramatically reduced the complexity of the typewriter design. A typical Blickensderfer contained only 250 parts, compared to the 2,500 parts of a standard typewriter. It was much smaller, lighter and cheaper than others. Some of the first aluminium typewriters, marketed as the Blickensderfer 6 and the Blickensderfer Featherweight, were made by Blickensderfer, as was the world's first fully electric typewriter, the Blickensderfer Electric.

Instead of the common mechanism with letters on the end of individual type bars connected to the keys, the first Blickensderfer prototype used a cylindrical typewheel with four rows of characters; lower case, upper case, italics and short words embossed on it. It was later modified to three rows of characters: lower case, upper case and a row of numbers and symbols. Depressing a key caused the typewheel to turn so the correct letter was positioned over the paper. As the wheel turned it moved downward, contacting an ink roller prior to striking the paper. This allowed for greater speed in typing as there were no keys to become jammed or stuck together. The interchangeable typewheel principle is very similar to the IBM Selectric design introduced almost 70 years later in 1961. Like the Selectric, one could easily change the typeface or the font style on a Blickensderfer simply by changing the typewheel.

Blickensderfers were also notable for their unique keyboard layout developed by George Blickensderfer after careful analysis of the English language. The home, or lowest row of keys, contained the most commonly used letters. Blickensderfer determined that 85% of words contained these letters, DHIATENSOR. This positioning allowed the typist to keep his hands on the home row as much as possible, minimizing extraneous hand movement and increasing efficiency. The QWERTY keyboard introduced on the Sholes & Glidden typewriter in 1874 was designed for purely mechanical reasons and the chances of the keys striking each other and jamming was more limited with this configuration. Because the Blickensderfer used the typewheel, the "scientific" keyboard layout could be used for maximum typing efficiency.

== Models ==
=== Model 5 ===
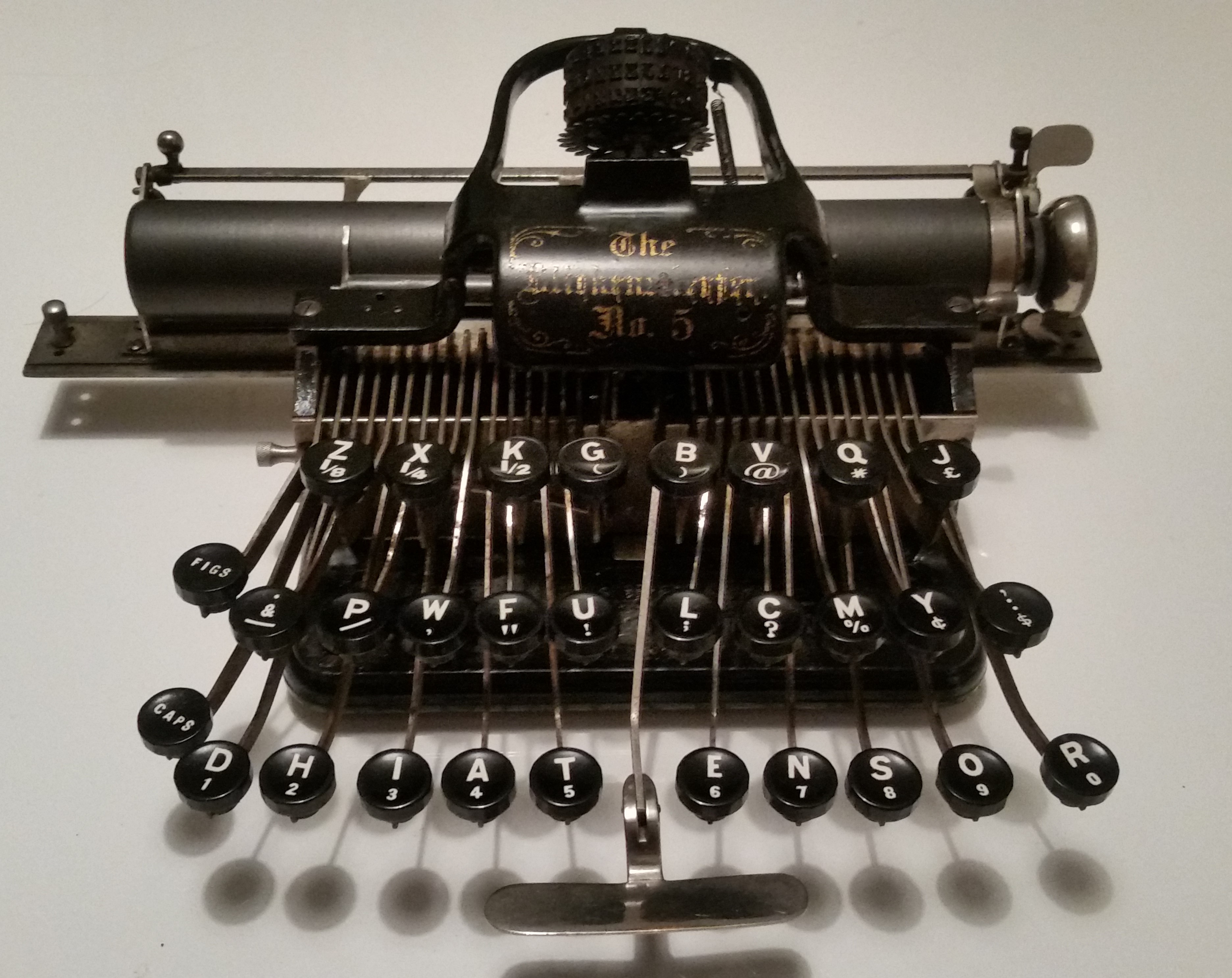
Very early example of a Blickensderfer No. 5 typewriter dated 1894

The first widely successful production model was the Blickensderfer 5, introduced at the 1893 World's Columbian Exposition in Chicago. Production of the model 5 did not seriously get underway until 1895-1896. The 5 was the first portable, full keyboard, typewriter and came with the DHIATENSOR keyboard as standard or with a QWERTY keyboard available on request. Some of the earliest Blickensderfer 5's were sold in France as the Dactyle. The Blickensderfer 5 was the simplest of all Blickensderfer models and more were produced than any other Blickensderfer machine. About 74,000 or 37% of the 200,000 Blickensderfer typewriters produced, were No. 5's and their production continued until 1913, when other models became more popular.

=== Model 6 and Featherweight ===
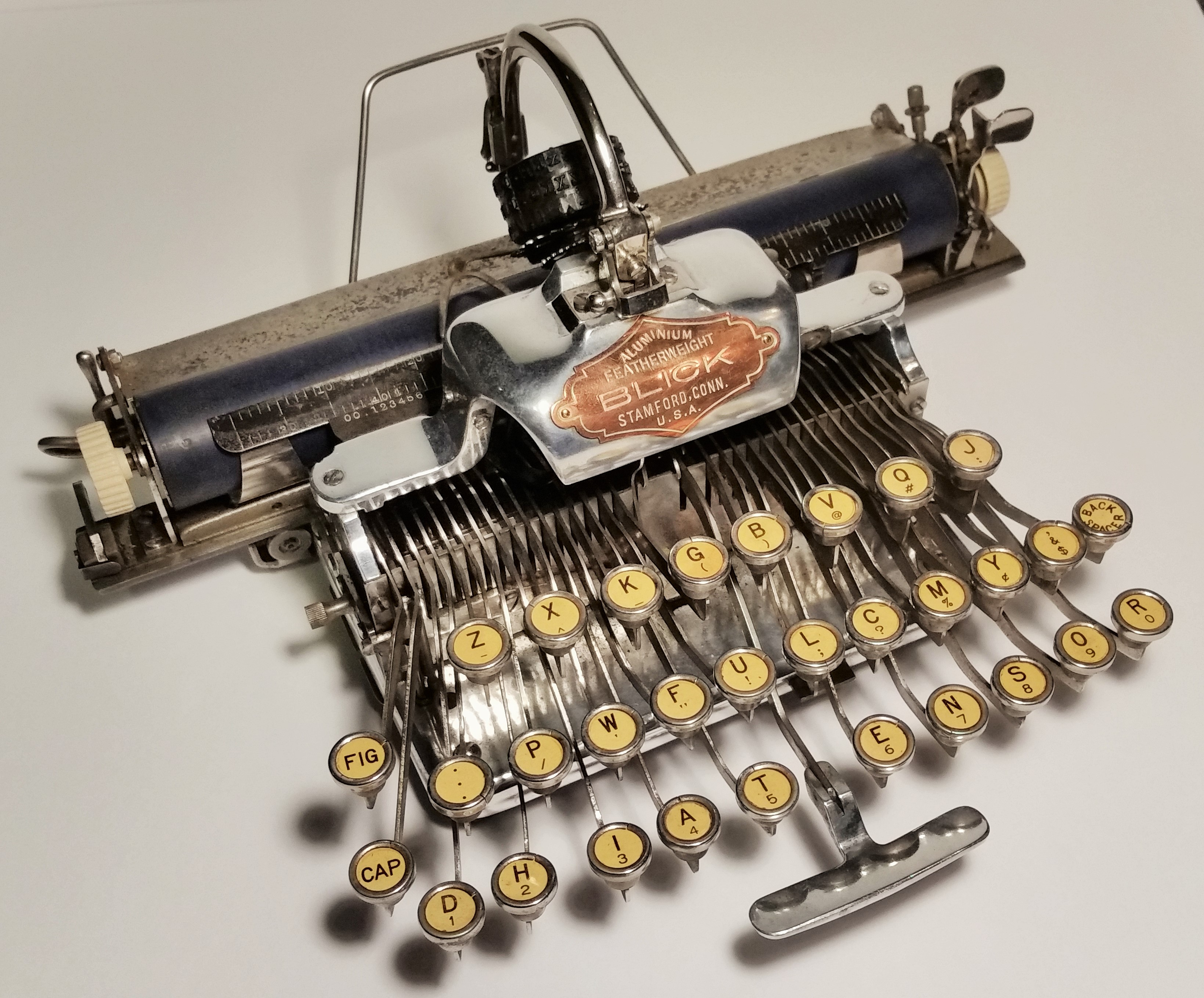
Blickensderfer Featherweight typewriter, 1915

In 1910 George Blickensderfer introduced the Blickensderfer 6, which was cast in aluminium and was essentially a lighter version of the Blickensderfer 5 which used cast iron. The aluminium version also appeared as the Blickensderfer Featherweight, which was an improved Model 6 with a backspace mechanism and the ink arm support was modified to an attractive curved folding design. These typewriters weighed only 5 pounds and were widely marketed as the Five-Pound Secretary.

=== Model 7 ===
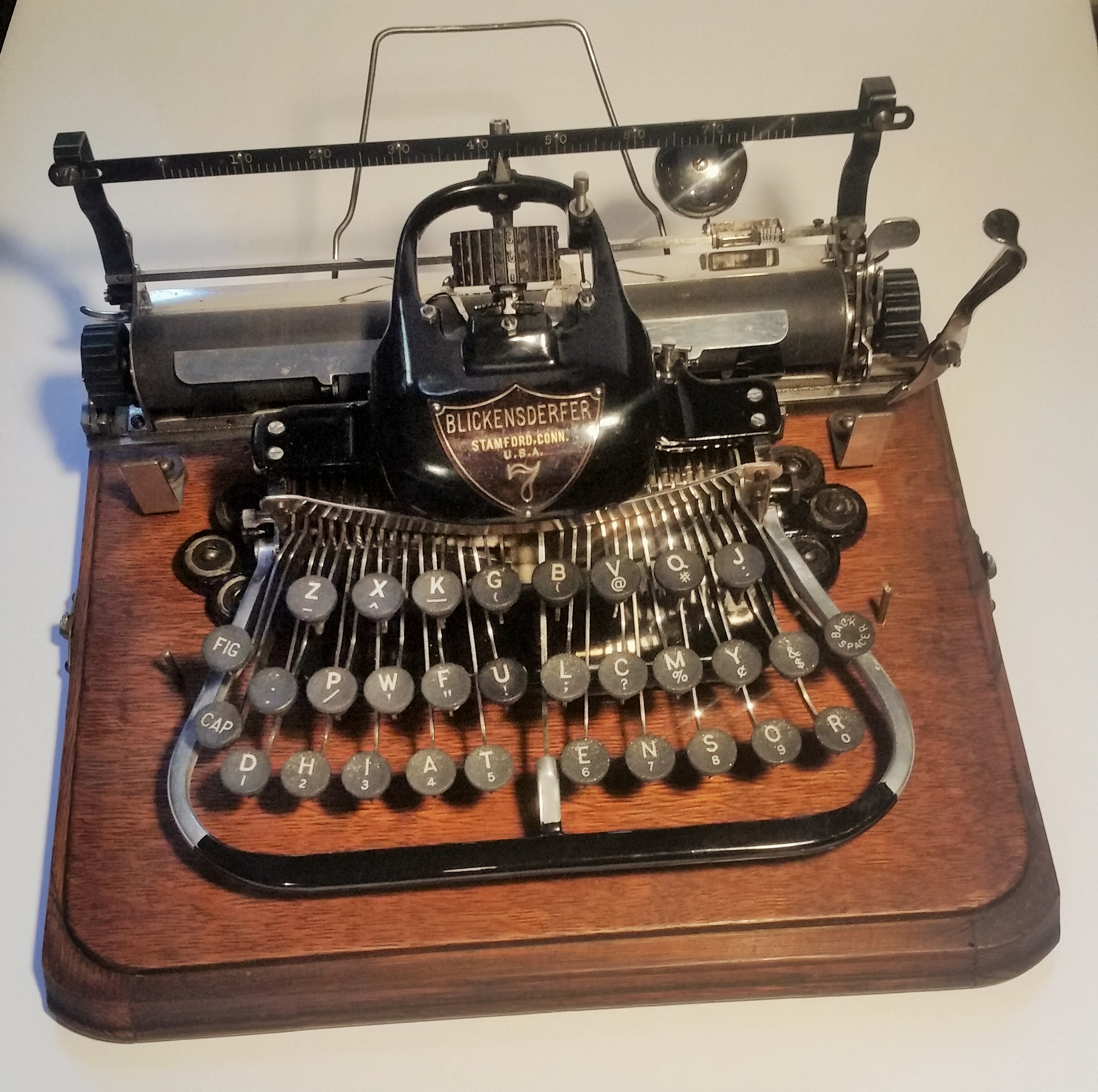
Blickensderfer model 7, 1909

The Model 7, first introduced in 1897, became the deluxe version of the basic No. 5 and was designed to please a greater cross section of the market. The most obvious difference was the wraparound space bar, which gave the machine a more solid and distinctive look. Blickensderfer also improved the paper scale, added black composite carriage knobs at both ends of the platen, added adjustable margin stops and a bell mechanism designed to be struck by a clapper attached to the inker arm indicating when the carriage was approaching the end of the typed line. The Blickensderfer 7 was also mounted on an oak base fitted with an attractive bentwood laminated oak case. About 63,000 Blickensderfer No. 7's were produced from 1897 until 1916.

=== Blickensderfer Electric ===
The Blickensderfer Electric was a revolutionary machine and was far ahead of its time when it was first introduced at the Pan-American Exhibition in Buffalo in 1901 following its patent in August 1900 (patent no.656,085). It had all the familiar characteristics of the manual models, plus a QWERTY or a DHIATENSOR keyboard and all the advantages of later electric typewriters, including a light key touch, even typing, and automatic carriage return and line spacing. The machine was powered by an Emerson electric motor mounted on the rear and switched on by turning a Yale key on the side. The motor ran on 104 Volt 60 Hz AC electric current, which was not yet widely standard at the time. (See War of the currents)

It is believed that the Blickensderfer Electric was produced from 1901 to 1919. Although a technological and engineering success, it was a commercial failure as at the time many homes and businesses were not wired for electricity. Electricity was primarily used for lighting and therefore not widely available during the daytime.

The Blickensderfer Electrics were advertised and marketed in both France and Britain, although it is not known how many machines were ultimately sold. Very few machines are known to exist today, and they are found with both straight fronts and QWERTY keyboards or curved fronts and DHIATENSOR keyboards.

=== Model 8 ===
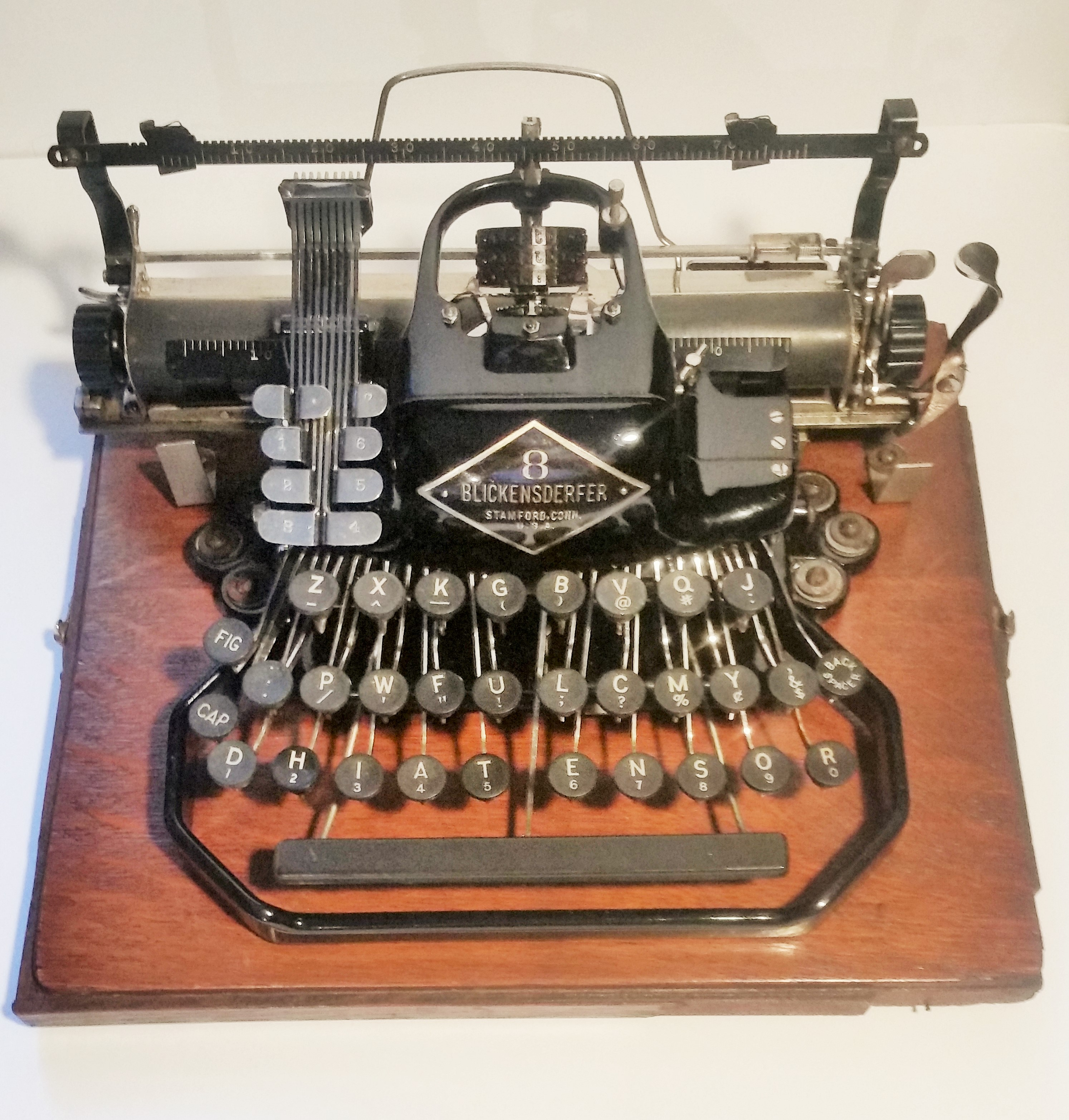
Blickensderfer model 8, 1909

The Blickensderfer 8 introduced in 1908 was the first Blickensderfer to boast a tabulator system (see Tab stop), even though tabulators had been around for some time. This model was a considerable success and more were sold in 1908 than any other model. This machine was more massive and sturdier looking than the 7 with a two-piece typehead casting and a popular backspace mechanism. The tabulator used large nickel-plated levers placed on top of the machine, making it easy to operate. Production peaked in 1910 and declined until production ended in 1917. About 20,000 Blickensderfer 8's were produced, accounting for about 10% of all Blickensderfer models sold.

=== Model 9 ===
The Model 9, believed to be introduced in mid-1910, was similar in appearance to the Model 8, but lacked the nickel plated tabulator keys and also featured a folding ink roller arm support similar to the Blickensderfer Featherweight. Only about 10,000 machines were produced, ending in 1919.

== Innovation and technology ==
On August 4, 1891, after several prototypes, Blickensderfer patented The Blickensderfer Type Writing Machine. The central component was the use of the cylindrical shaped interchangeable type element which he initially patented on July 15, 1890. An earlier variation to Blickensderfer's typewheel was introduced on the Crandall 1 typewriter in 1883 but Blickensderfer's genius was in the use of the typewheel combined with the simplicity and the small size of his machine. This invention was unlike anything else on the market and was considered a mechanical marvel that took typewriter engineering to a new level. Striking a key turned the wheel to the appropriate orientation while inking the typeface as it tipped downward past the ink roller to strike the paper. Holding the Cap or Fig keys shifted the typewheel along its axis to use either the middle row, for capital letters, or the lower row, for special characters and numbers.

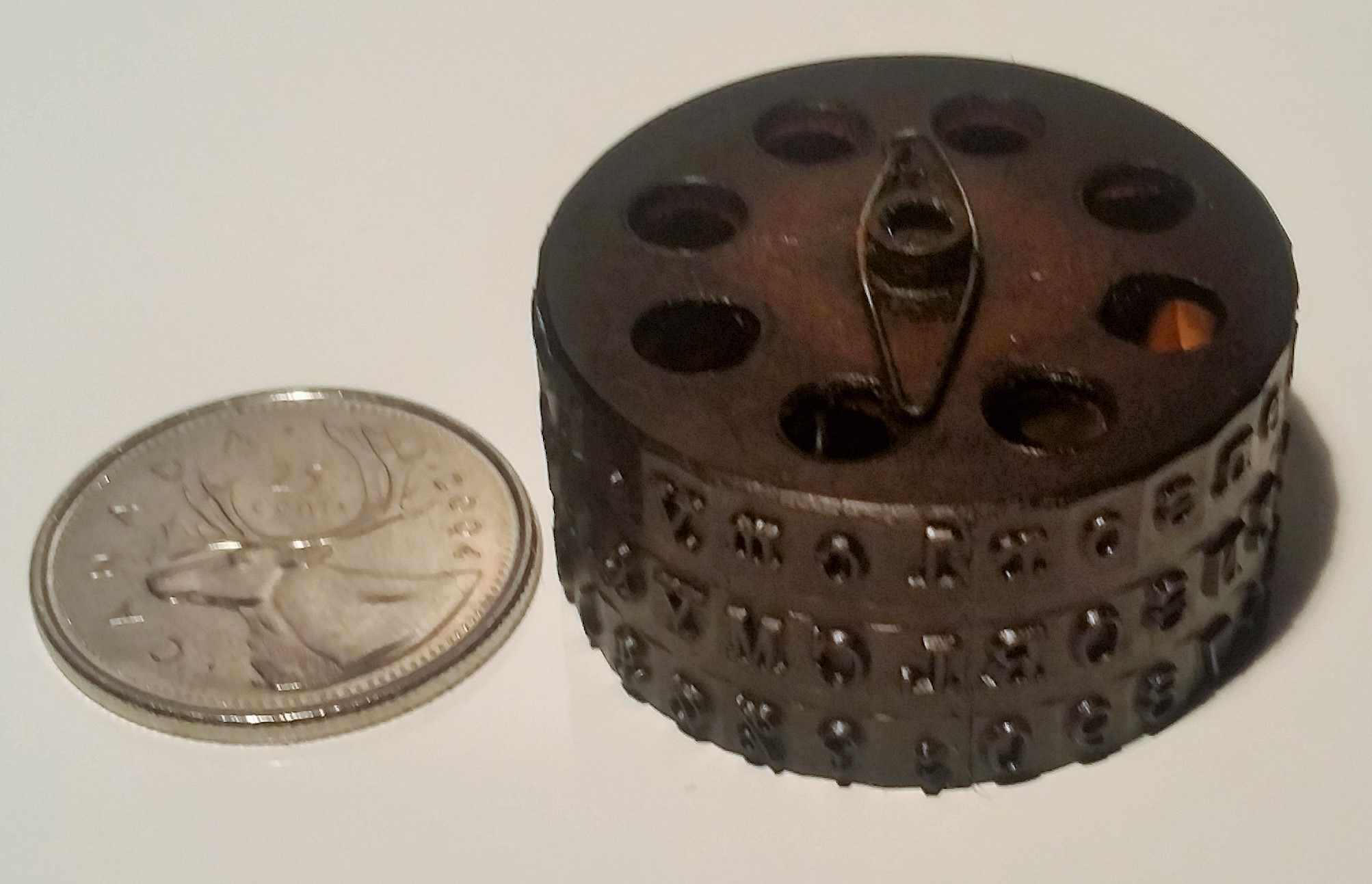
Blickensderfer typewheel

Industrial production in the 1890s was not highly automated and assembly was done completely by hand. This allowed for easy design changes and improvements to the production process. Blickensderfer continued to improve his machines and a number of new patents were filed for the Blickensderfer 5 up to June 1, 1897, when the machine largely remained the same for the balance of its production life. Blickensderfer continued to invent new machines until his death, including the Blickensderfer Electric and various standard machines with the Blickensderfer 9 being his last major new model.

The typewheel, like the later typeball of the IBM Selectric typewriter, was the central component of all the Blickensderfer machines. It could be easily removed, allowing users to select a large variety of fonts and typefaces. Later in the company’s production history, the basic machines' keyboards could easily be adapted to other languages at the Blickensderfer factory simply by changing the removable keytop covers and adding the corresponding language typewheel.

== Scientific keyboard ==
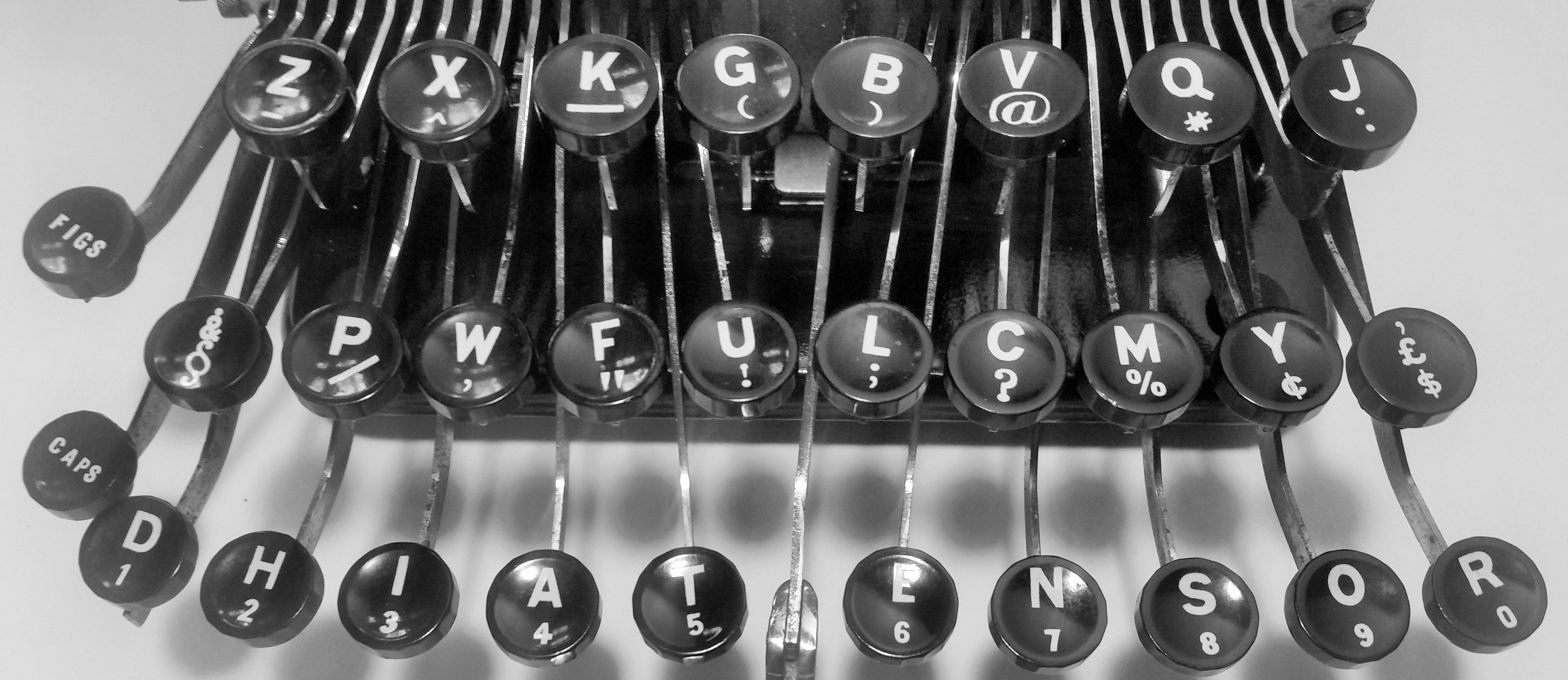
Blickensderfer scientific keyboard

One unique feature of the Blickensderfer typewriter was the scientific or DHIATENSOR keyboard. The DHIATENSOR layout is shown below (with alphanumeric characters only): Blickensderfer analyzed the English language and proposed a unique and more efficient keyboard based on his research. He determined that the ten most frequently used letters were A, D, E, H, I, N, O, R, S, and T, and were used in about 70% of written text and in about 85% of all words. The middle row contained letters that occurred 24% of the time and the top row about 6%. Blickensderfer offered the scientific keyboard in the hopes that his more efficient system would replace the clumsy but widely used QWERTY or universal keyboard developed by Sholes and Glidden in 1874. Unfortunately for Blickensderfer, no other typewriter manufacturer adopted the scientific keyboard and Blickensderfer had no choice but to offer the universal keyboard on all his machines as an option. Toward the end of the company's existence, most machines were sold with the universal keyboard. There were modifications to the layout made for Spanish, French, German, and Polish.

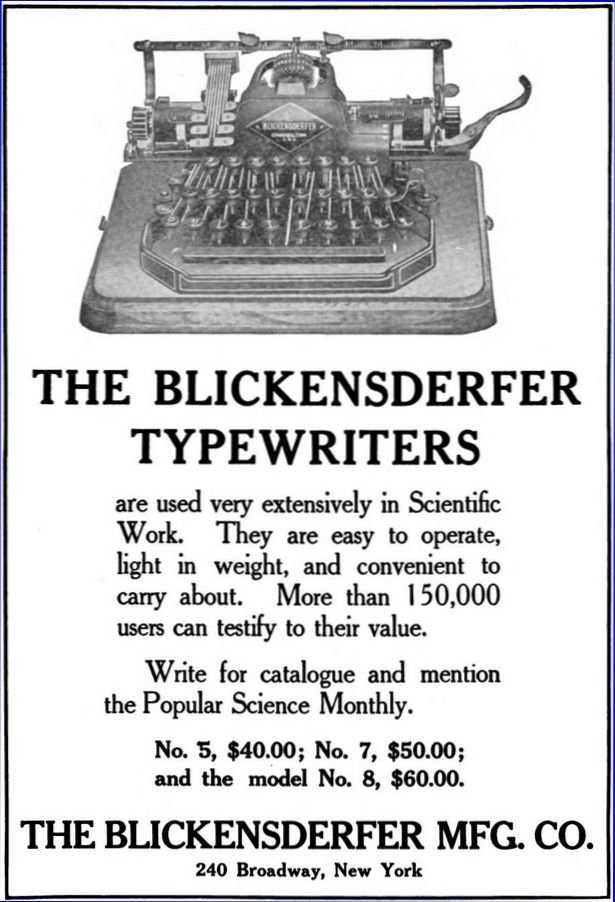
Blickensderfer scientific keyboard advertisement

By way of comparison, the later Dvorak keyboard layout has the consonants on its home row in DHIATENSOR order: D H T N S. The Dvorak R is in the neighboring far row, between T and N. The same vowels, plus U, are present on the left in a different order. Another machine that had its keys arranged in a scientific order, although not designed for home use, was the Linotype machine, with the first two columns of the lower-case and caps key sections arranged in ETAOIN SHRDLU order.

== Sources ==
- Milton, Richard (2004). "Portable Typewriters - Blickensderfer". Archived from the original on 2006-03-29. (via Internet Archive)
- http://www.antikeychop.com/blickensderfer-typewriters
- http://www.stamfordhistory.org/blickens.htm
- http://www.portabletypewriters.co.uk/portable_typewriters_blickensderfer.htm

== Bibliography ==
- Canfield, Fredreick A. (1897). A History of Thomas Canfield and of Matthew Camfield with A Genealogy of their Descendants in New Jersey. The Title Morehouse & Taylor Press, New Haven Conn.
- Blickensderfer, Robert; Paul Robert (2003). The Five-Pound Secretary An illustrated history of the Blickensderfer Typewriter. The Virtual Typewriter Museum. ISBN 90-74999-05-0.
