= Bristol College (Pennsylvania) =

United States historic place

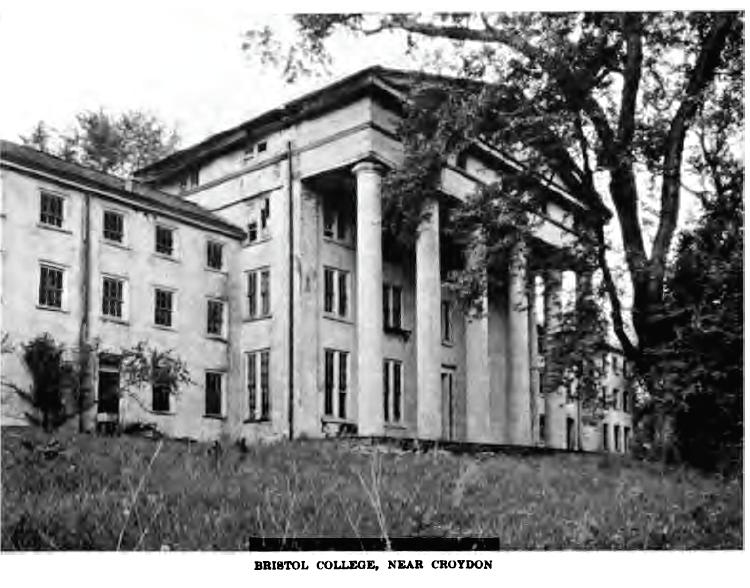
- Type: Private
- Active: 1833–1837
- Founder: Episcopal Education Society of Philadelphia
- Religious affiliation: Episcopal Church
- President: Rev. Chauncey Colton
- Location: Bucks County, Pennsylvania
- Campus: Rural
- White Hall of Bristol College
- U.S. National Register of Historic Places
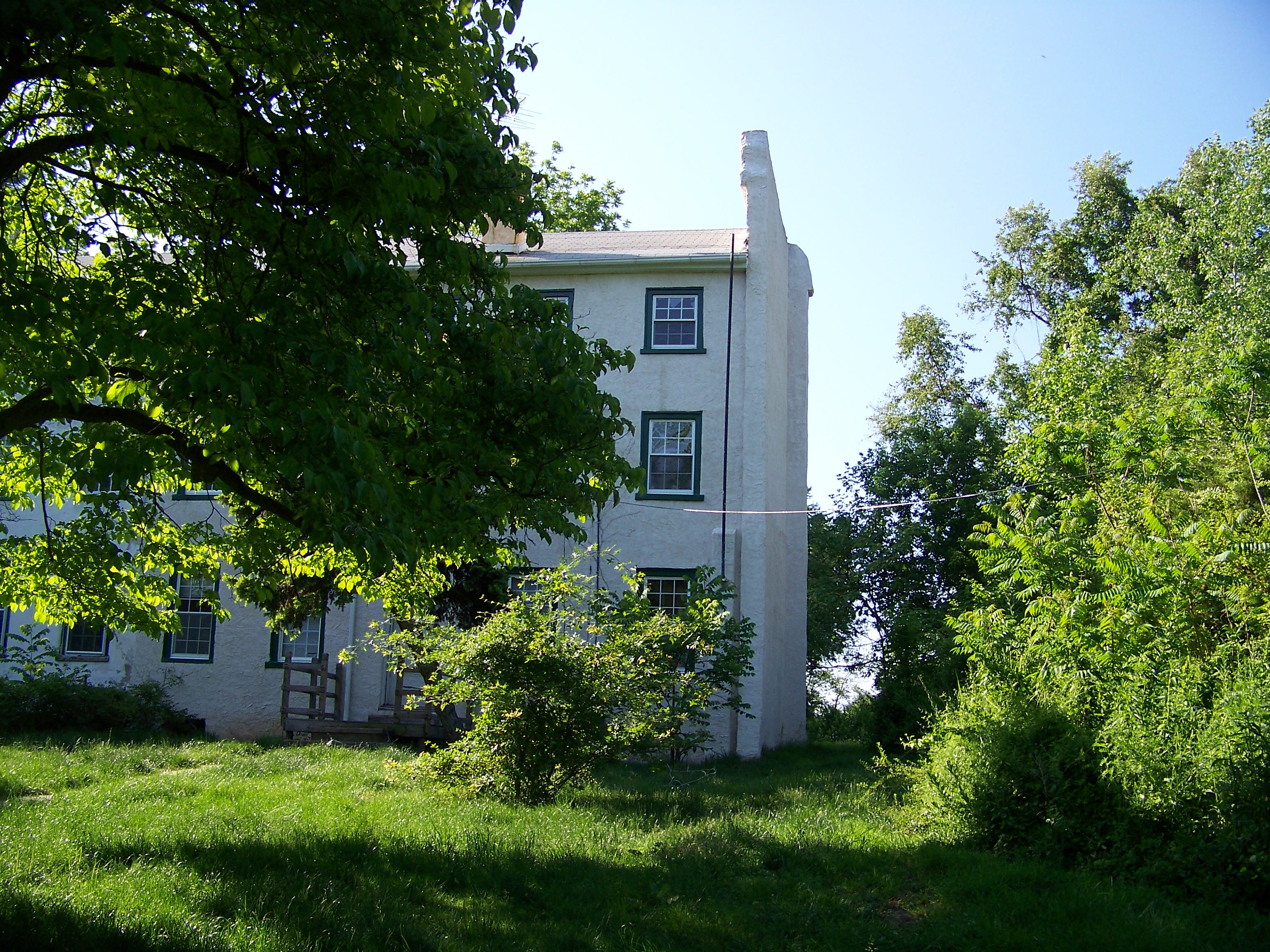
- The remains of the 19th-century college in 2008

- Location within Pennsylvania
- Location: 701-721 Shadyside Avenue in Croydon, Pennsylvania
- Coordinates: 40°4′48″N 74°54′8″W
- Area: 1.2 acres (0.49 ha)
- Built: 1834
- Architect: A. J. Davis
- Architectural style: Greek Revival
- NRHP reference No.: 84003177
- Added to NRHP: January 12, 1984

Bristol College was an Episcopal manual labor college located near Bristol, Pennsylvania. It was established on October 2, 1833, by the Episcopal Education Society of Philadelphia. The Rev. Chauncey Colton (1800–1876) was its only president. The institution closed in February 1837 for lack of financial support.

== History ==
The college was built on the banks of the Delaware River, 2 miles (3.2 km) from Bristol, Pennsylvania. The White Hall of the college, built by Alexander Jackson Davis in Greek Revival style, is on the National Register of Historic Places. Bristol College was used as a hospital during the American Civil War, and from 1868 through the 1880s as an orphanage for the children of colored soldiers. The center columned section of the last remaining building, White Hall was condemned and later demolished in the 1980s. The East and West wings still stand and act as apartments.

== Pennsylvania Literary, Scientific, and Military Academy ==
The Pennsylvania Literary, Scientific, and Military Academy was established on the former Bristol College building and grounds on September 5, 1842, by Captain Alden Partridge, and was conducted by him until April 1845, when it was discontinued and reopened at Harrisburg, on April 14, of the same year. The academy was conducted by the graduates and past cadets of Norwich University. Henry V. Morris, served as the professor of Mathematics and Tactics from 1843 to 1845; Alvan E. Bovay was in charge of the Classical Department from 1843 to 1844; and Edward M. Brown was instructor of mathematics from April 1844 to April 1845.

== Notable people ==
- Gregory Thurston Bedell Bishop of Ohio (Episcopal Church)
- William Muhlenberg Hiester
- Benjamin Chew Tilghman
- Richard Grant White literary scholar and critic (Father of Stanford White)
- William N. Pendleton faculty mathematics teacher, Episcopal priest, and Confederate Brigadier General during the U.S. Civil War
- John Celivergos Zachos U.S. Civil War Army Surgeon and Educator
- Benjamin Blake Minor
