= Vanessa Zachos =

English film and television actress

- Born: Vanessa Zachos
- Occupation: actress
- Years active: 2008–present

Vanessa Zachos (born 3 May) is an English film and television actress from South African mixed heritage. She has appeared on American television as well as in international feature films opposite leading actors, including Ron Howard's BAFTA-nominated Rush.

Zachos was cast in a principal role opposite Chris Hemsworth in Ron Howards BAFTA nominated film Rush where she worked alongside Chris Hemsworth and Daniel Brühl. She appeared in her first guest star role on American television in an episode of J. J. Abrams award-winning TV series Fringe directed by P. J. Pesce for FOX Broadcasting Company. She portrays Anita Halina Janowska in the documentary film Rebel of the Keys and made her first European television appearance in Der Andere on the Austrian Broadcasting Corporation.
