= Morea expedition =

Part of the Greek War of Independence (1828 to 1833)

Expedition of the Morea
- Part of the Greek War of Independence
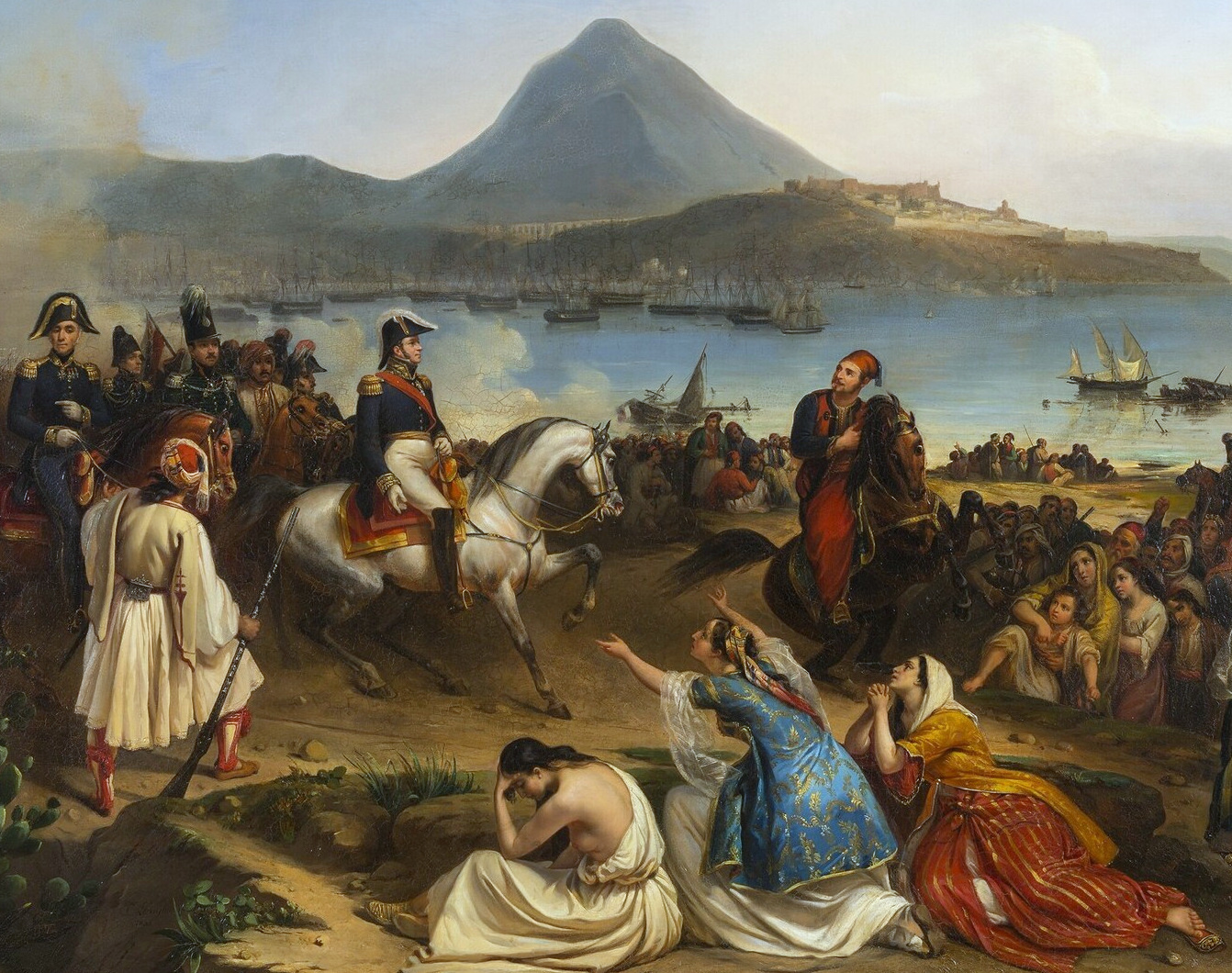
- Meeting between General Maison and Ibrahim Pasha in Navarino in September 1828 (detail) (by Jean-Charles Langlois, 1838)
| Date | August 1828 – August 1833 |
| Location | Peloponnese (Morea) |
| Result | French victory |
| Territorial changes | Retreat of Ibrahim from Peloponnese |

Belligerents
| Kingdom of France; First Hellenic Republic | Ottoman Empire; Egypt Eyalet |

Commanders and leaders
| –Nicolas Joseph Maison (military expedition): Jean Baptiste Bory de Saint-Vincent (scientific expedition) | –Ibrahim Pasha of Egypt |

Casualties and losses
| 1,500 dead | Unknown |

The Morea expedition (French: Expédition de Morée) is the name given to the land intervention of the French Army in the Peloponnese between 1828 and 1833, at the time of the Greek War of Independence, with the aim of expelling the Ottoman-Egyptian occupation forces from the region. It was also accompanied by a scientific expedition mandated by the French Academy.

After the fall of Messolonghi in 1826, the Western European powers decided to intervene in favour of revolutionary Greece. Their primary objective was to force Ibrahim Pasha, the Ottoman Empire's Egyptian ally, to evacuate the occupied regions and the Peloponnese. The intervention began when a Franco-Russo-British fleet was sent to the region and won the Battle of Navarino in October 1827, destroying the entire Turkish-Egyptian fleet. In August 1828, a French expeditionary corps of 15,000 men led by General Nicolas-Joseph Maison landed in the southwestern Peloponnese. During October, soldiers took control of the principal strongholds still held by the Turkish troops. Although the bulk of the troops returned to France in early 1829 after an eight month-deployment, the French kept a military presence in the area until 1833. The French army would suffer about 1,500 dead, mainly due to fever and dysentery.

As had occurred during Napoleon's Egyptian Campaign, when a Commission des Sciences et des Arts accompanied the military campaign, a scientific commission (Expédition scientifique de Morée) was attached to the French troops and placed under the supervision of three academies of the Institut de France. Directed by the naturalist and geographer Jean-Baptiste Bory de Saint-Vincent, nineteen scientists representing different specialties in natural history, archaeology and architecture-sculpture made the voyage to Greece in March 1829; most of them stayed there for nine months. Their work proved essential to the ongoing development of the new Greek State and, more broadly, marked a major milestone in the modern history of archaeology, cartography and natural sciences, as well as in the study of Greece.

== Context ==
=== Military and diplomatic context ===
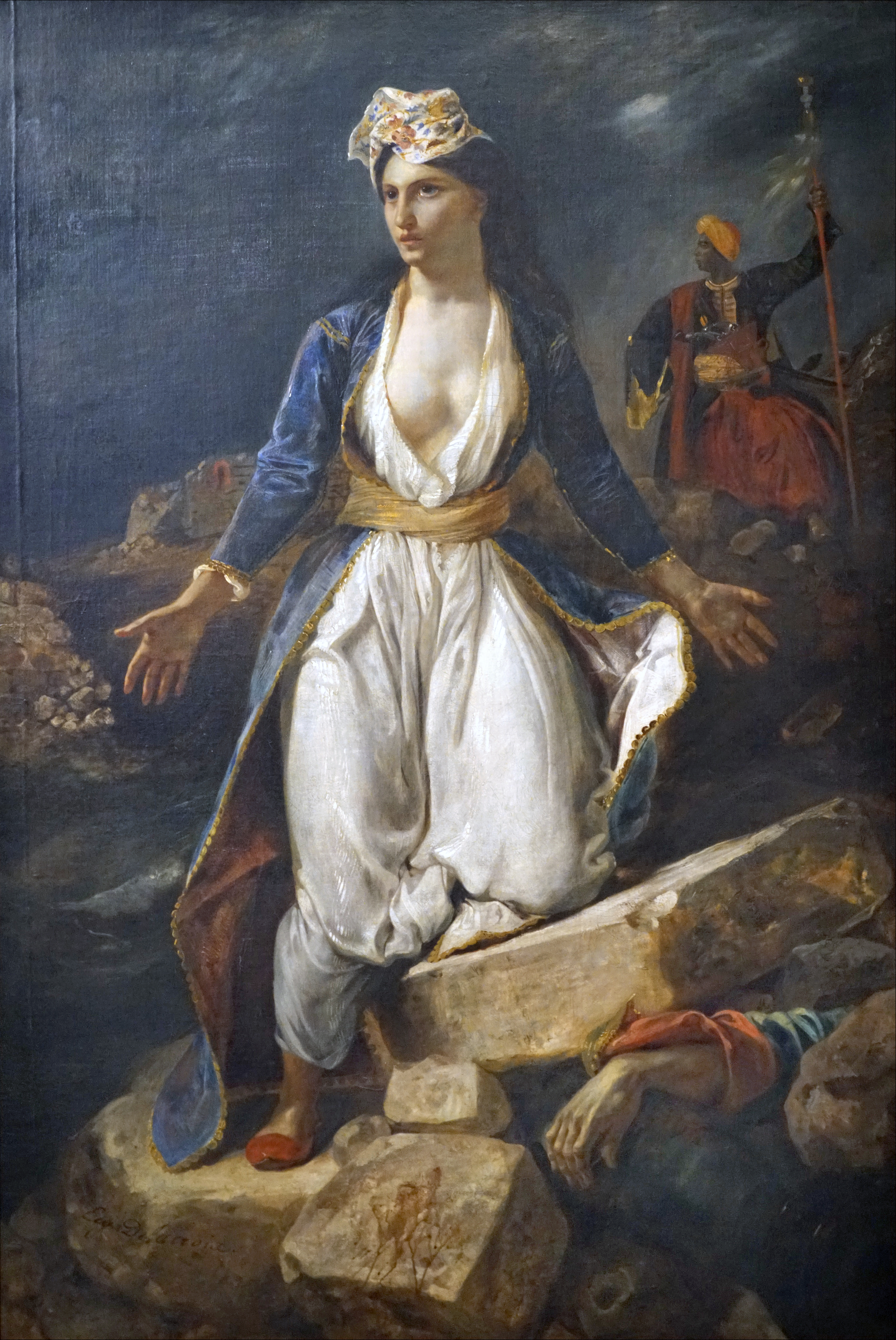
Delacroix, Greece on the Ruins of Missolonghi. This painting played an important role in the public opinion campaign in the West that led to an intervention.

In 1821, the Greeks revolted against centuries-long Ottoman rule. They won numerous victories early on and declared independence on 1 January 1822. However, the declaration contradicted the principles of the Congress of Vienna and of the Holy Alliance, which imposed a European equilibrium of the status quo, outlawing any possible change. In contrast to what happened elsewhere in Europe, the Holy Alliance did not intervene to stop the liberal Greek insurgents.

The liberal and national uprising displeased Metternich, chancellor of the Austrian Empire and the principal political architect of the Holy Alliance. Russia looked favourably on the insurrection due to its Orthodox religious solidarity and its geostrategic interest (control of the Dardanelles and the Bosphorus). France, another active member of the Holy Alliance, had just intervened in Spain against liberals at Trocadero (1823) but held an ambiguous position: Paris saw the liberal Greeks first and foremost as Christians, and their uprising against the Muslim Ottomans had undertones of a new crusade. Great Britain, a liberal country, was interested in the situation of the region, primarily because it was on the route to India and London wished to exert there a form of control. Finally, for all of Europe, Greece represented the cradle of Western civilisation and of art since antiquity.

The Greek victories had been short-lived. The Sultan had called for aid from his Egyptian vassal Muhammad Ali, who dispatched his son Ibrahim Pasha to Greece with a fleet and 8,000 men, and later added 25,000 troops. Ibrahim's intervention proved decisive: much of the Peloponnese was reconquered in 1825; the gateway town of Messolonghi fell in 1826; and Athens was taken in 1827. The only territory still held by Greek nationalists was in Nafplion, Mani, Hydra, Spetses and Aegina.

A strong current of philhellenism had developed in Western Europe, especially after 1826 and the fall of Missolonghi, where the poet Lord Byron had died in 1824. Many artists and intellectuals such as François-René de Chateaubriand, Victor Hugo, Alexander Pushkin, Gioachino Rossini, Hector Berlioz or Eugène Delacroix (in his paintings of The Massacre at Chios in 1824, and of Greece on the Ruins of Missolonghi in 1826), amplified the current of sympathy for the Greek cause in the public opinion. The European powers eventually decided to intervene in favour of Greece—a Christian vanguard in the Orient—whose strategic location in containing Muslim expansion was obvious to those political powers. By the Treaty of London of 6 July 1827, (Note: The text on Gallica) France, Russia and the United Kingdom recognised the autonomy of Greece, which remained a vassal state of the Ottoman Empire. The three powers agreed to a limited intervention in order to convince the Porte to accept the terms of the convention. A plan to send a naval expedition as a demonstration of force was proposed and adopted; subsequently a joint Russian, French and British fleet was sent to exert diplomatic pressure against Constantinople. The Battle of Navarino (20 October 1827) resulted in the complete destruction of the Turkish-Egyptian fleet.

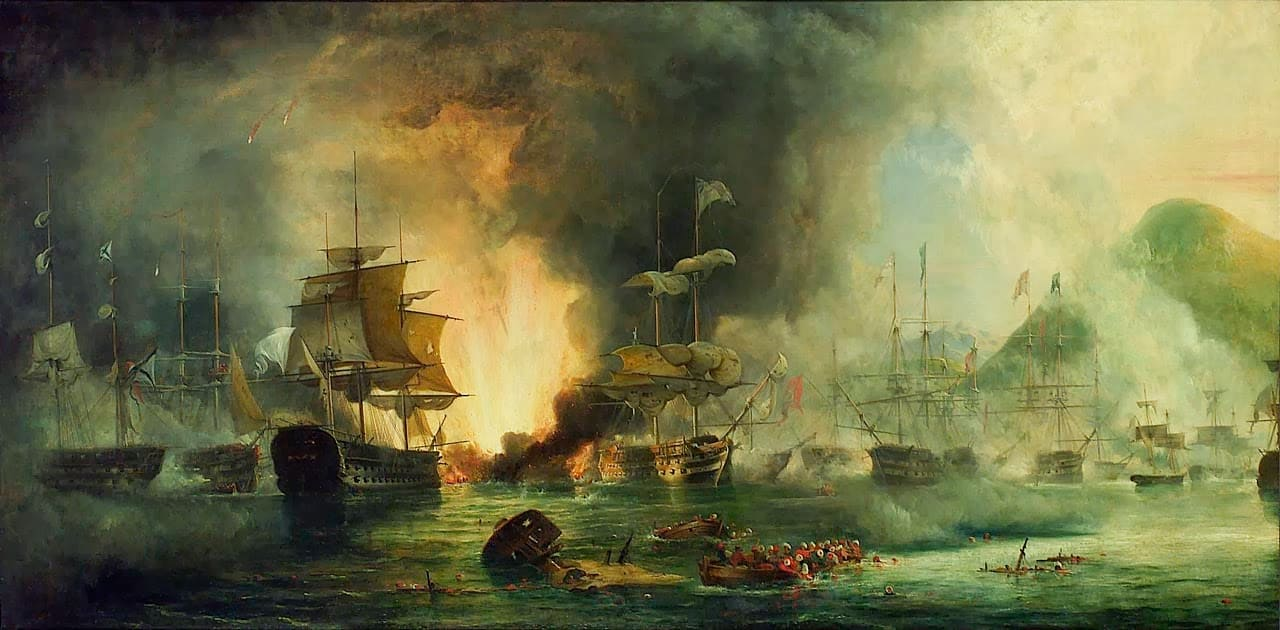
The Battle of Navarino by George Philip Reinagle, depicting the Allied naval victory (Britain, France, and Russia) over the Ottoman–Egyptian fleet on 20 October 1827

In 1828, Ibrahim Pasha thus found himself in a difficult situation: he had just suffered a defeat at Navarino; the joint fleet enforced a blockade which prevented him from receiving reinforcements and supplies; and his Albanian troops, whom he could no longer pay, had returned to their country under the protection of Theodoros Kolokotronis' Greek troops. On 6 August 1828, a convention had been signed at Alexandria between the viceroy of Egypt, Muhammad Ali, and the British admiral Edward Codrington. By its terms, Ibrahim Pasha was required to evacuate his Egyptian troops and leave the Peloponnese to the few Turkish troops (estimated at 1,200 men) remaining there, but he refused to honour the agreement and continued to control various Greek regions: Messenia, Navarino, and Patras as well as several other strongholds—and even ordered the systematic destruction of Tripolitza.

Meanwhile, the French government of Charles X was beginning to have doubts about its Greek policy. Ibrahim Pasha himself noted this ambiguity when he met General Maison in September. Eventually a pro-Greek liberal movement, inspired by what was then happening in Greece, began to develop in France. The longer France waited to act, the more delicate her position vis-à-vis Metternich became. The ultra-royalist government thus decided to accelerate events. A proposal to send a joint land expedition was made to Great Britain, which refused to intervene directly. Meanwhile, Russia had declared war against the Ottoman Empire and its military victories were unsettling for Great Britain, which did not wish to see the Tsarist empire extend too far south, and compelled it to not oppose an intervention by France alone.

=== Intellectual context ===
Enlightenment philosophy had stimulated Western Europeans' interest in Greece, or rather in an idealised ancient Greece, the linchpin of classical antiquity as it was perceived and taught in academe. Enlightenment philosophers, for whom the notions of Nature and Reason were so important, believed that these had been the fundamental values of classical Athens. The ancient Greek democracies, and above all Athens, became models to emulate. There they searched for answers to the political and philosophical problems of their time. Works such as Abbé Barthélemy's Voyage du Jeune Anacharsis (1788) served to fix definitively the image that Europe had of the Aegean.

The theories and system of interpreting ancient art devised by Johann Joachim Winckelmann influenced European tastes for decades. His major work, History of Ancient Art, was published in 1764 and translated into French in 1766 (the English translation did not appear until 1881). In this major work Winckelmann initiated the tradition of dividing ancient art into periods, classifying the works chronologically and stylistically.

The views of Winckelmann on art encompassed the entirety of civilisation. He drew a parallel between a civilisation's general level of development and the evolution of its art. He interpreted this artistic evolution the same way that his contemporaries saw the life cycle of a civilisation in terms of progress—apogee and then decline. For him, the golden age of Greek art had been the pinnacle of artistic achievement, culminating with the career of the sculptor Phidias. Further, Winckelmann believed that the most beautiful works of Greek art had been produced under ideal geographic, political and religious circumstances. This frame of thought long dominated intellectual life in Europe. He classified Greek art into four periods: Ancient (archaic period), Sublime (Phidias), Beautiful (Praxiteles) and Decadent (Roman period).

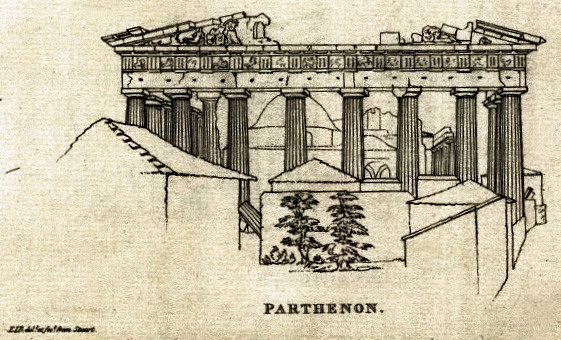
The Parthenon at the time of Lord Elgin

Winckelmann concluded his theory on the evolution of art with an explication of the Sublime period of Greek art, which had been conceived during a period of political and religious liberty. His theories idealised ancient Greece and increased Europeans' desire to travel to contemporary Greece. It was seductive to believe, as he did, that 'good taste' was born beneath the Greek sky. He persuaded 18th-century Europe that life in ancient Greece was pure, simple and moral, and that classical Hellas was the source from which artists should draw ideas of "noble simplicity and calm grandeur". Greece became the "motherland of the arts" and "the teacher of taste".

The French government had planned the Morea expedition in the same spirit as those of James Stuart and Nicholas Revett, whose work it wished to complete. The semi-scientific expeditions commissioned and financed by the Society of Dilettanti remained a benchmark: these represented the first attempts to rediscover ancient Greece. The first, that of Stuart and Revett to Athens and the islands, took place in 1751–1753, and resulted in publication of The Antiquities of Athens, a work mined by architects and designers for models of a refined "Grecian" neoclassicism. The expedition of Revett, Richard Chandler and William Pars to Asia Minor took place between 1764 and 1766. Finally, the removal by Lord Elgin of half of the surviving marble sculptures of the Parthenon, as well as sculptures from other buildings, and their transport to Britain at the beginning of the 19th century, had inspired further philhellenic longing for the cultural glories of ancient Greece: it now seemed possible to build vast collections of ancient art in Western Europe.

== Military expedition ==
Much of the information concerning the Morea expedition comes from the direct testimonies of Louis-Eugène Cavaignac (2nd Engineer Regiment and future Prime Minister of France in 1848), of Alexandre Duheaume (Captain in the 58th Line Infantry Regiment), Jacques Mangeart (co-founder of a printing company and of the Franco-Greek newspaper "Le Courrier d'Orient" in Patras in 1829) and Doctor Gaspard Roux (Chief Medical Officer of the expedition) who all took part to the military expedition.

=== Preparation ===
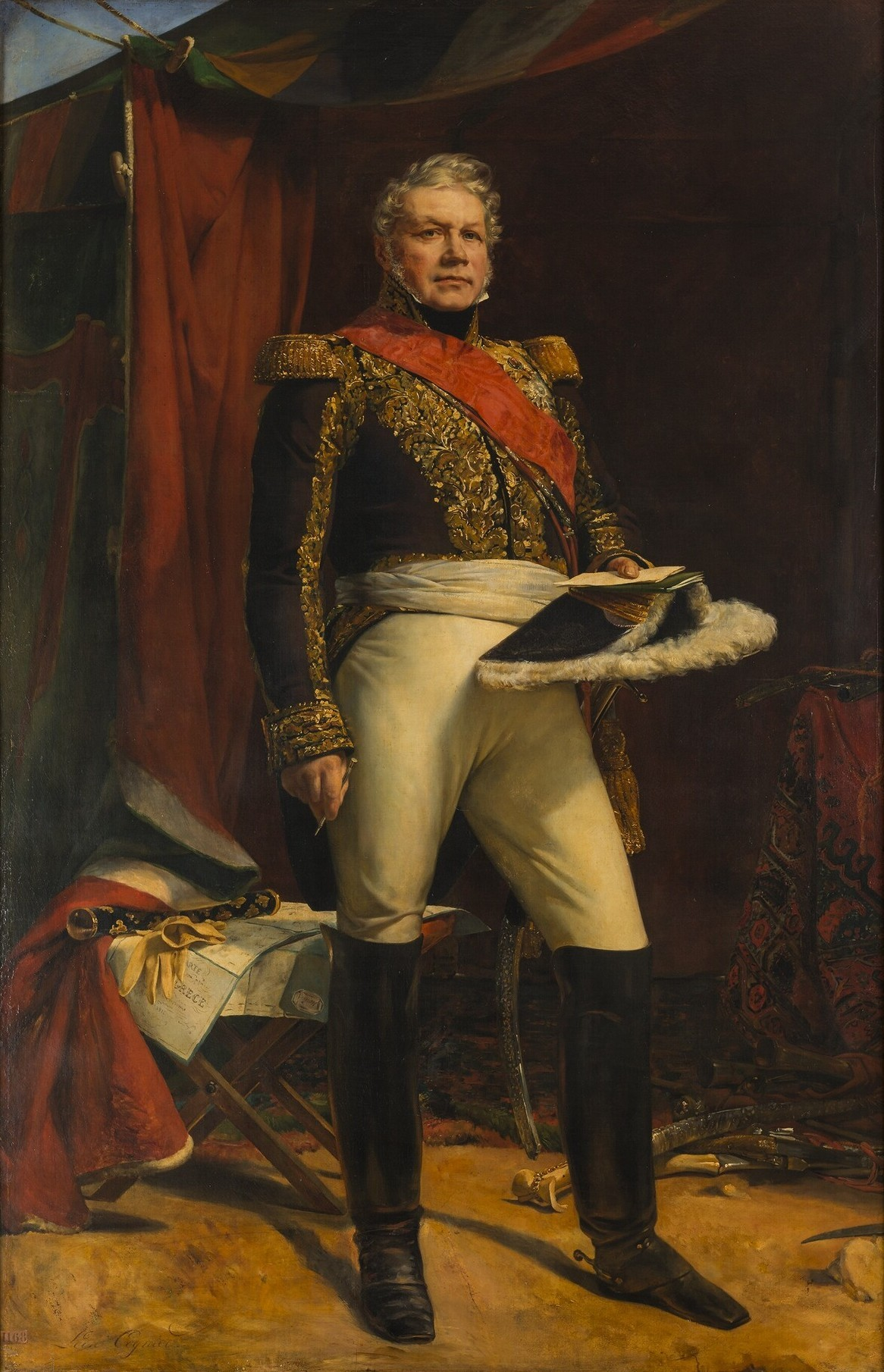
Portrait of Nicolas Joseph Maison, by Leon Cogniet, Commander-in-Chief of the expeditionary corps from 1828 to 1829

The Chamber of Deputies authorised a loan of 80 million gold francs to allow the government to meet its obligations for the expedition. An expeditionary corps of 13,000–15,000 men commanded by Lieutenant-General Nicolas Joseph Maison was formed. It was composed of nine infantry regiments distributed in three brigades commanded by the maréchaux de camp Tiburce Sébastiani (brother of Marshal Horace Sébastiani, soldier, diplomat and minister, 1st brigade), Philippe Higonet (2nd brigade), and Virgile Schneider (3rd brigade). The Chief of the General Staff was General Antoine Simon Durrieu.

Also departing were the 3rd Chasseur Regiment (1st brigade, 286 men, commanded by Colonel Paul-Eugène de Faudoas-Barbazan), four companies of artillery (484 men, with 12 battery pieces for sieges, 8 for campaigns, and 12 for mountains) of the 3rd and 8th Artillery Regiments, and two companies of military engineers that included 800 sappers (combat engineers) and miners.

A transport fleet protected by warships was organised; sixty ships sailed in all. Equipment, victuals, munitions and 1,300 horses had to be brought over, as well as arms, munitions and money for the Greek provisional government of Ioannis Kapodistrias. France wished to support the first steps of free Greece by helping it developing its own army. The aim was also to gain influence in the region.

After a brief and energetic proclamation by General-in-Chief Nicholas Joseph Maison was read to the companies assembled the day before boarding, the first brigade left Toulon on 17 August; the second, two days later; and the third on September 2 in a second distinct convoy. The general in command, Nicolas Joseph Maison, was with the first brigade, aboard the ship of the line Ville de Marseille. The first convoy was composed of merchant ships and was escorted by the frigates Amphitrite, Bellone and Cybèle. The second convoy was escorted by the ship of the line Duquesne and by the frigates Iphigénie and Armide.

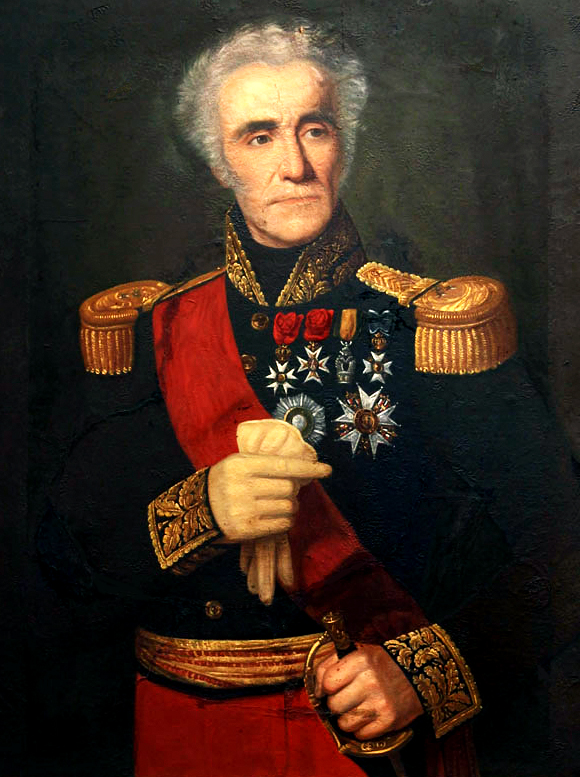
General Antoine Simon Durrieu (Chief of General Staff)

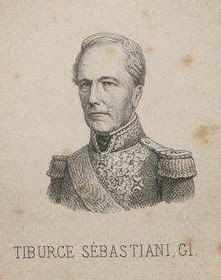
General Tiburce Sébastiani (1st brigade)

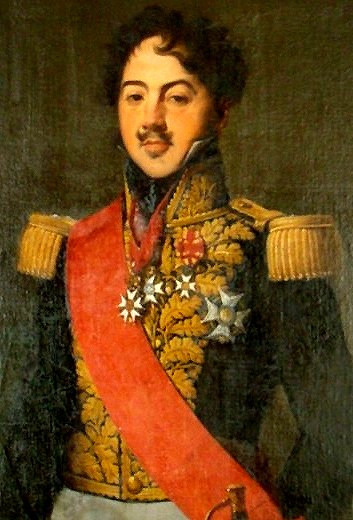
General Philippe Higonet (2nd brigade)

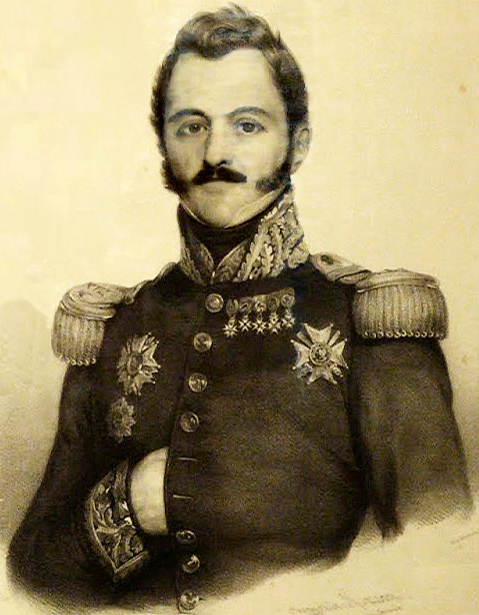
General Virgile Schneider (3rd brigade)

=== Operations in the Peloponnese ===
==== Landing ====
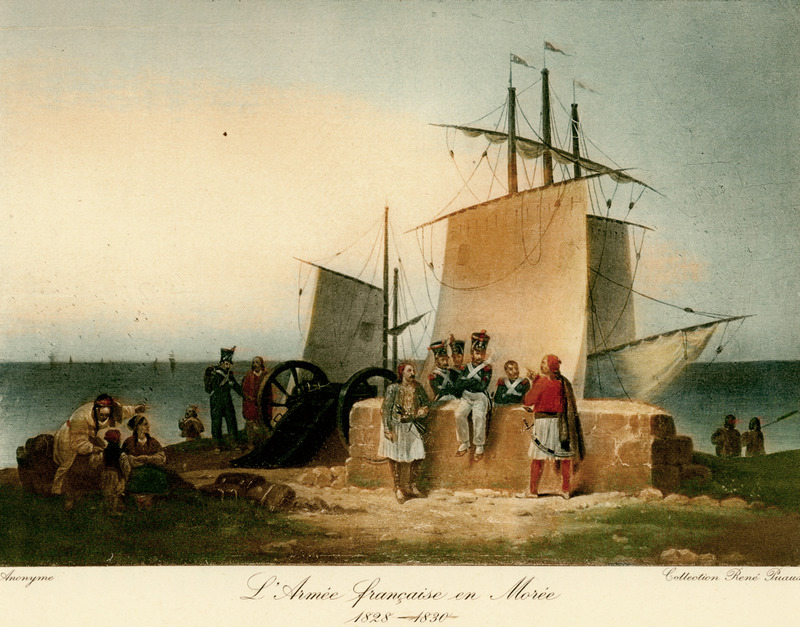
French soldiers lounging about in discussion with Greeks

After a boat passage without problems, the first convoy transporting the two first brigades arrived on 28 August in Navarino bay, where the joint Franco-Russo-British squadron was berthed. With the Egyptian army ensconced between Navarino and Methoni, the landing was risky. After a two-hour meeting between General Maison and Admiral Henri de Rigny, who came to meet him aboard the Conquérant, the fleet sailed toward the Messenian Gulf, whose southern entrance was protected by a fort held by the Ottomans in Koroni. The expeditionary corps reached the northwest part of the Gulf and began disembarking on the evening of 29 August with no opposition, and finished on 30–31 August. Soldiers pitched camp north of the plain of Koroni, ten minutes north of the ruins of ancient Coronea (near Petalidi), on the banks of the rivers Djane (for the General Staff), Karakasili-Karya and Velika. A proclamation by governor Ioannis Kapodistrias had informed the Greek population of the imminent arrival of a French expedition. It was said that the locals would have rushed up before the troops as soon as they set foot on Greek soil to offer them food. The 1st brigade commanded by Tiburce Sébastiani let the camp on 8 September for Koroni, on the heights of which it installed its camp. The 3rd brigade (2nd convoy), which had been carried by a fleet that sailed against a storm on the night of 16 September and lost three ships (including the brig Aimable Sophie which transported 22 horses of the 3rd Chasseur Regiment), managed to land at Petalidi on 22 September. On the 26th, it joined by sea the 2nd brigade, which had already moved by foot from Petalidi on 15 September and settled its camp of Djalova near Navarino. At their arrival on the Greek soil, the French found a country that had just been ravaged by Ibrahim's troops: villages razed to the ground, agricultural crops entirely burned and a population still living under a yoke of terror, starving and secluded in caves.

I took the Venetian roadway from Modon, through the layers of ash and the coals of the olive trees whose valley was once shaded. Some caves open sadly on the way. In place of the villages, kiosks and towers that hung on the mountain's half-slope, one sees nothing any more but long charred walls, and the huts of the Pasha's troops in the form of clay boats, moored at the feet of the mountains. Once, I headed to the remains of a Byzantine church, where I thought I saw collapsed marble; but it turned out that the porch and the circuit were strewn with white skeletons. — Edgar Quinet

The day after we arrived, we went ashore, where the most dreadful spectacle I had seen in my life awaited me. In the middle of a few wooden huts built on the shore, outside the city (Navarino), of which only ruins remained, circulated, hasty and ragged, men, women, children, who had nothing left human in features: some without noses, others without ears, all more or less covered with scars; but what moved us at the last point was a little child of four or five years old whom his brother led by the hand; I approached him: his eyes had been gouged out. Turks and Egyptians spared no one in this war. — Amaury-Duval

==== Departure of the Egyptian Army ====
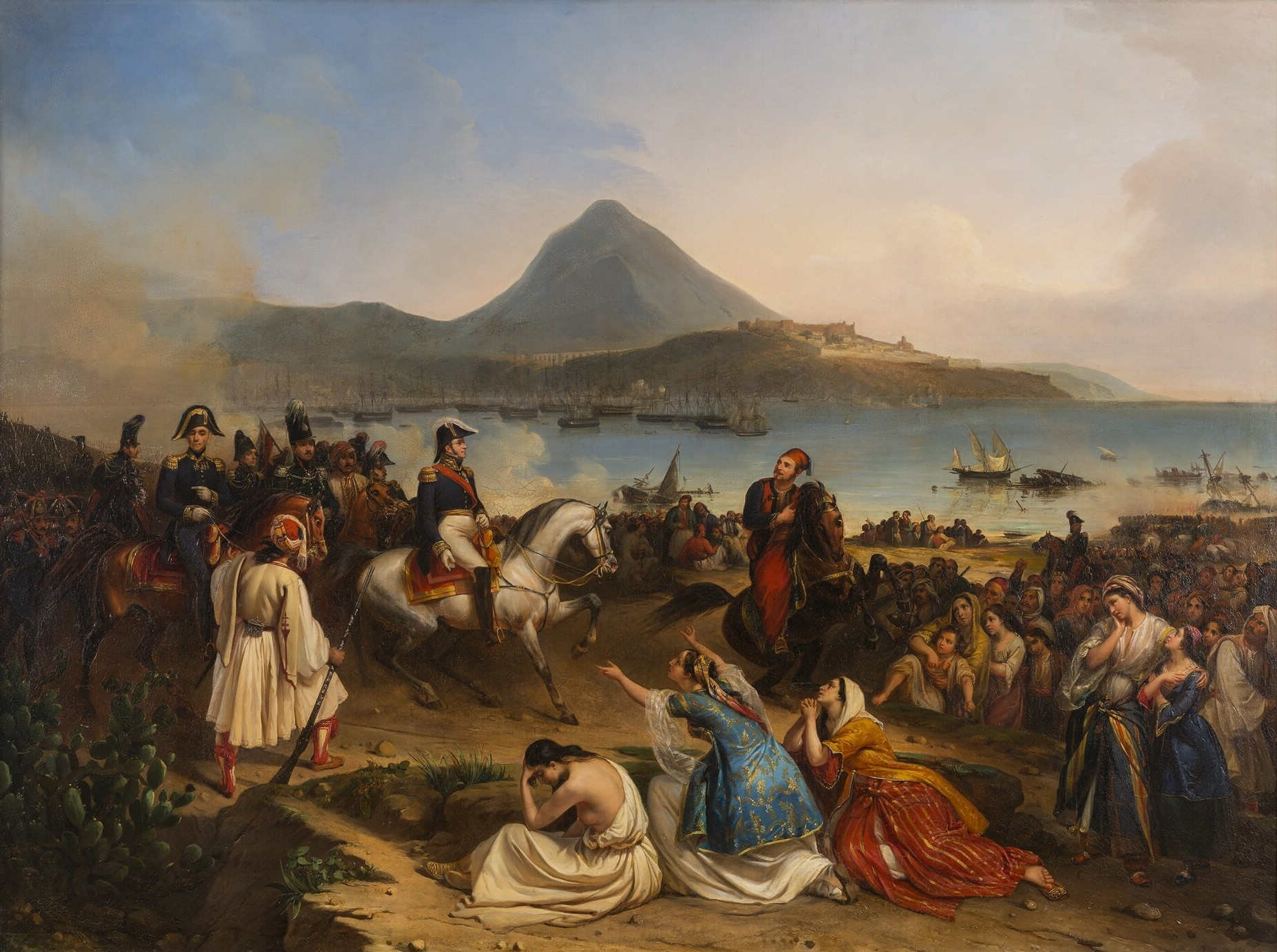
Meeting between General Maison and Ibrahim Pasha in September 1828 (Jean-Charles Langlois)

According to the Convention of Alexandria (6 August 1828), signed by the viceroy of Egypt, Muhammad Ali, and the British admiral Edward Codrington, Ibrahim Pasha was required to evacuate his Egyptian troops and leave the Peloponnese to the few Turkish troops (estimated at 1,200 men) remaining there. He used a number of pretexts to delay the evacuation: problems with food supply or transport, or unforeseen difficulties in handing over the strongholds. The French officers had problems restraining the fighting zeal of their soldiers, who for example had become excited at the (false) news of an imminent march on Athens. The impatience of the French troops was perhaps decisive in convincing the Egyptian commander to respect his obligations. Moreover, the French soldiers began to suffer from the autumnal rains that drenched the tents pitched in their camps and favoured the spread of fever and dysentery. On 24 September, Louis-Eugène Cavaignac wrote that thirty men of 400 in his company of military engineers were already affected by fever. General Maison wished to be able to set up his men in the fortresses' barracks.

On 7 September, following a long conference aboard the ship Conquérant, in the presence of General Maison and the three allied Admirals, Ibrahim Pasha accepted the evacuation of his troops as of 9 September. The agreement provided that the Egyptians would leave with their arms, baggage and horses, but without any Greek slaves or prisoners. As the Egyptian fleet could not evacuate the entire army in one operation, supplies were authorised for the troops who remained on land; these men had just endured a lengthy blockade. A first Egyptian division, 5,500 men and 27 ships, set sail on September 16, escorted by three ships from the joint fleet (two English ones and the French frigate Sirène). The day before, on 15 September, the French troops had moved their camp from Petalidi and had crossed the Messenian peninsula to the west in order to get closer to Navarino. They had set up their new camp north of the bay in the swampy plain of the Djalova, two leagues north of Navarino. On 1 October, General Maison reviewed the entire French troops on the shore, in the presence of Ibrahim Pasha who came without escort, and of the Greek General Nikitaras. The French printer Jacques Mangeart gave a detailed description of this review in his Souvenirs.

The evacuation continued throughout the month of September and the last Egyptian transport sailed away on 5 October, taking Ibrahim Pasha. Of the 40,000 men he had brought from Egypt, he was returning with barely 21,000. A few Ottoman soldiers (2,500) remained to hold the different strongholds of the Peloponnese. The next mission of the French troops was to secure them, and hand them back to an independent Greece.

==== Strongholds taken ====
The dispatches sent by Lieutenant-General Nicolas-Joseph Maison, Commander in chief of the Morea expedition, to the Minister of War Louis-Victor de Caux de Blacquetot offer a detailed description of the taking of the strongholds of Morea during the month of October 1828.

===== Navarino =====
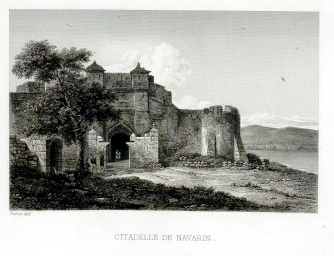
The New Navarino fortress, taken by General Philippe Higonet

On 6 October, the day after Ibrahim's departure, General Maison ordered General Philippe Higonet to march on Navarino. He left with the 16th Infantry Regiment, which included artillery and military engineers. Navarino's seacoast was put under siege by Admiral Henri de Rigny’s fleet and the land siege was undertaken by General Higonet's soldiers. The Turkish commander of the fort refused to surrender: "The Porte is at war with neither the French nor the English; we will commit no hostile act, but we will not surrender the fort". Whereupon the sappers were ordered to open a breach in the walls and General Higonet entered the fortress, held by 530 men who surrendered without a shot being fired, along with sixty cannon and 800,000 rounds of ammunition. The French troops settled permanently in Navarino, rebuilding its fortifications and houses and setting up a hospital and various features of local administration.

===== Methoni =====
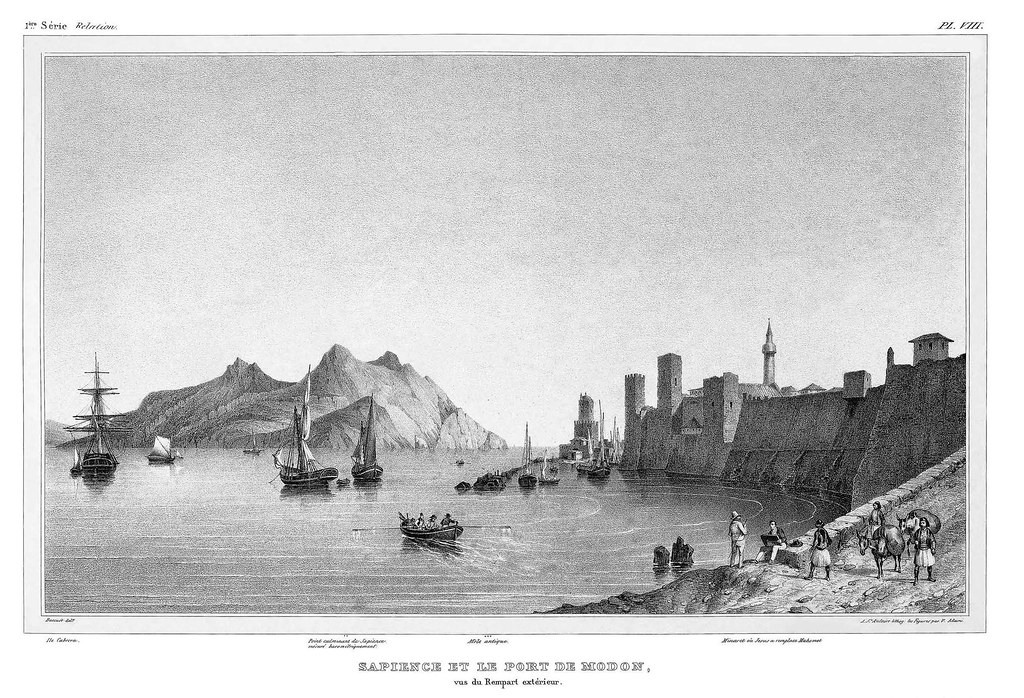
The fortress of Methoni, taken by General Antoine-Simon Durrieu

On 7 October, the 35th Line Infantry Regiment, commanded by General Antoine-Simon Durrieu, accompanied by artillery and by military engineers, appeared before Methoni, a better fortified city defended by 1,078 men and a hundred cannon, and which had food supplies for six months. Two ships of the line, the Breslaw (Captain Maillard) and HMS Wellesley (Captain Frederick Lewis Maitland) blocked the port and threatened the fortress with their cannons. The fort's commanders, the Turk Hassan Pasha and the Egyptian Ahmed Bey, made the same reply as had the commander of Navarino. Methoni's fortifications were in better condition than those of Navarino, so the sappers focused on opening the city gate, which the city's garrison did not defend. The commanders of the fort later explained that they could not surrender it without disobeying the Sultan's orders, but also recognised that it was impossible for them to resist, thus the fort had to be taken, at least symbolically, by force. The French general granted them the same surrender conditions as in Navarino. The fortress of Methoni was taken and General Maison installed his apartments there (in the former home of Ibrahim Pasha), as well as the headquarters of the Morea expedition.

===== Koroni =====
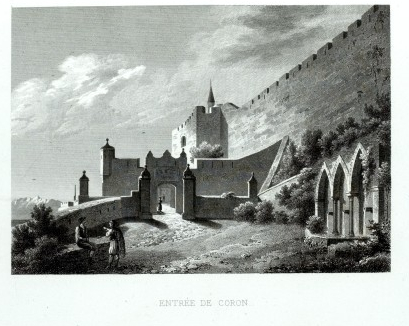
The fortress of Koroni, taken by General Tiburce Sébastiani

It was more difficult to take Koroni. General Tiburce Sébastiani showed up there on 7 October with a part of his 1st brigade and announced the taking of the fortresses of Navarino and Methoni. The fort commander's response was similar to those given at Navarino and Methoni. Sébastiani sent his sappers, who were pushed back by rocks thrown from atop the walls. A dozen men were wounded, among them Cavaignac and, more seriously, a captain (Boutauld), a sergeant and three sappers. The other French soldiers felt insulted and their general had great difficulty in preventing them from opening fire and taking the stronghold by force. The Amphitrite, the Breslaw and the Wellesley came to assist the ground troops. The threat they posed led the Ottoman commander to surrender. On October 9, the French entered Koroni and seized 80 cannon and guns, along with a store of victuals and munitions. The fortress was then given to the Greek troops of General Nikitaras who settled there.

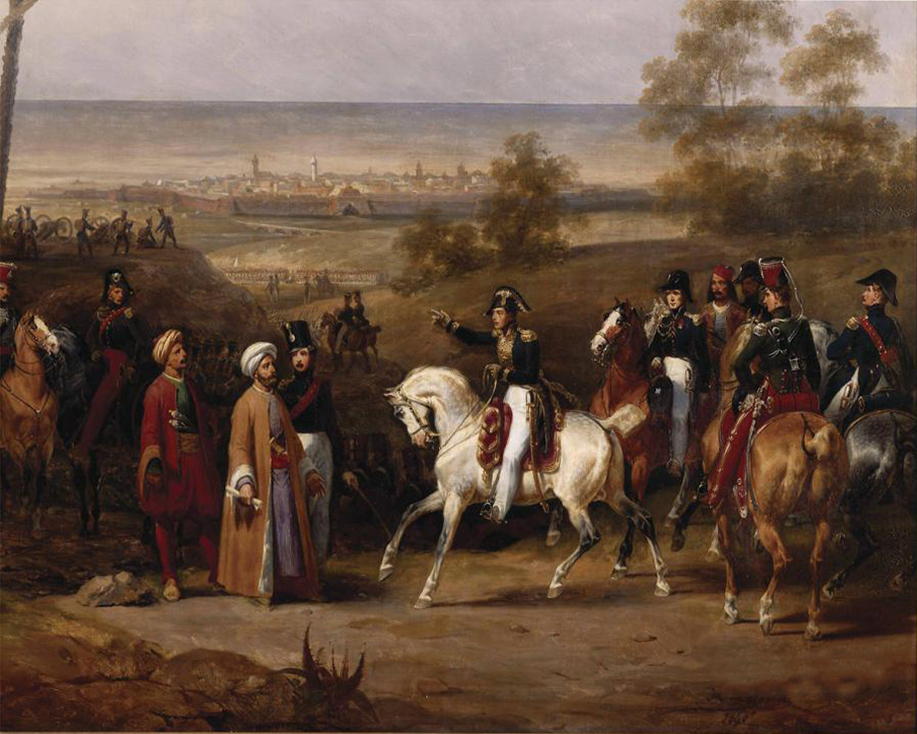
Take of Koroni by Generals Sébastiani and Nikitaras (Hippolyte Lecomte)

===== Patras =====
Patras had been controlled by Ibrahim Pasha's troops since his evacuation of the Peloponnese. The 3rd brigade commanded by General Virgile Schneider had been sent by sea to take the city, located in the north-western part of the peninsula. It landed on October 4. General Schneider gave Hadji Abdullah, Pasha of Patras and of the Castle of Morea, twenty-four hours to hand over the fort. On 5 October, when the ultimatum expired, three columns marched on the city and the artillery was deployed. The Pasha immediately signed the capitulation of Patras and of the Castle of Morea. However, the aghas who commanded the latter refused to obey their pasha, whom they considered a traitor, and announced that they would rather die in the ruins of their fortress than surrender.

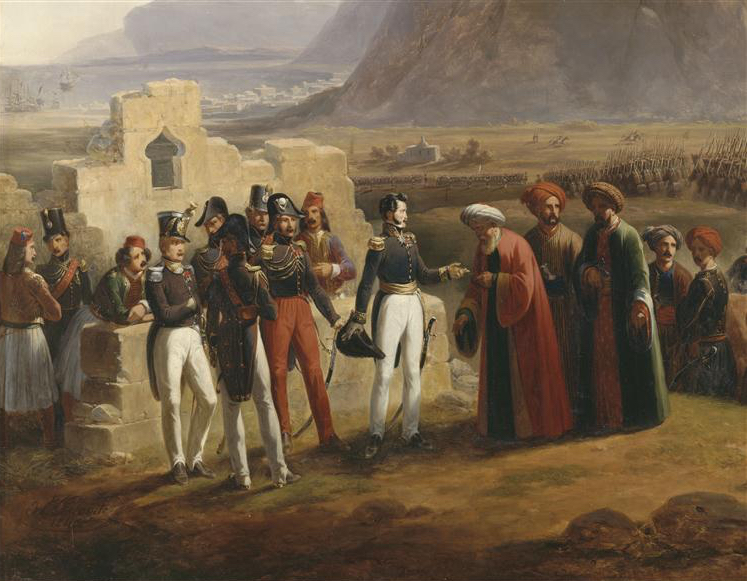
Surrender of Patras to General Virgile Schneider (Hippolyte Lecomte)

However, as early as October 14, the corvette Oise had left for France, bearing son and aide-de-camp of General Maison, Captain of Staff Jean Baptiste Eugène, Viscount Maison, who carried dispatches to King Charles X announcing the surrender of Navarino, Methoni, Koroni and Patras, and that only stronghold was still under the control of the Turks, the Castle of the Morea.

===== Siege of the Castle of the Morea =====
The Castle of the Morea (Kastro Moreas or Kastelli) was built by Bayezid II in 1499. It is located beside the sea, 10 km north of Patras, near Rion, and next to the current Rio–Antirrio bridge. Opposite the Castle of Rumelia on the northern coast, it guarded the entry to the Gulf of Corinth, which was nicknamed the "Little Dardanelles".

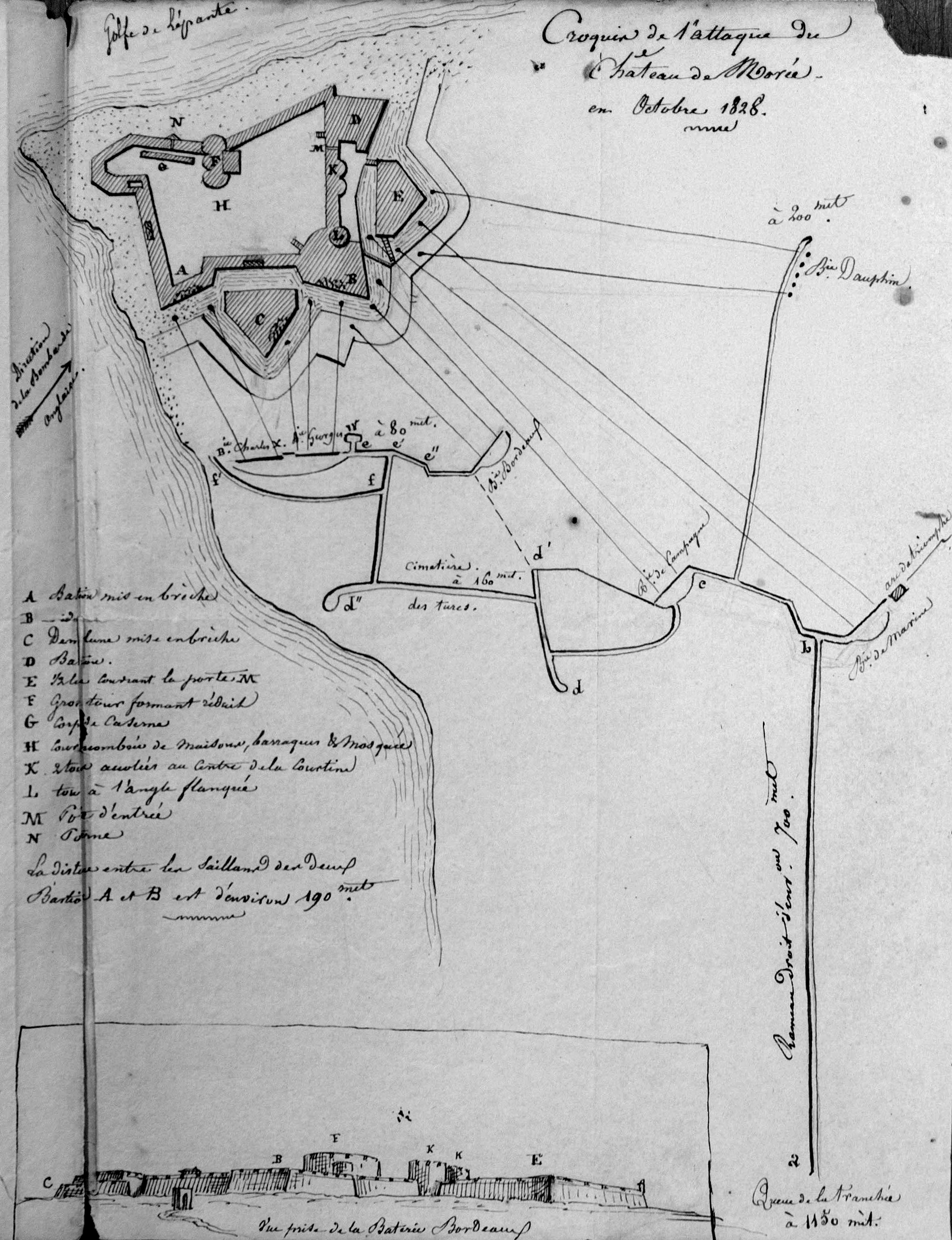
Plan of attack on the Castle of the Morea (manuscript of Colonel Antoine-Charles-Félix Hecquet of the 54th Infantry Regiment)

General Schneider negotiated with the aghas, who persisted in their refusal to surrender and even shot the general. A siege against the fortress was begun and fourteen marine and field guns, placed a little over 400 meters in front of it, reduced the artillery of the besieged to silence. In Navarino, General Maison commanded General Durrieu and Admiral de Rigny to have all the artillery and sappers embark in the ships anchored in the bay. On 20 October he also sent by land General Higonet, accompanied by two infantry regiments and by the 3rd Light Cavalry Regiment of the Chasseurs. These reinforcements arrived on the evening of 26 October after an intensive week of marching with their pace set by the rhythm of the drums. New batteries nicknamed for breaching (de brèche) were installed. These received the names "Charles X" (King of France), "George IV" (King of the United Kingdom; this attention was greeted by the British), "Duke of Angoulême" (son of the king and Dauphin of France), "Duke of Bordeaux" (grandson of the king, and future count of Chambord) and "La Marine". A part of the French fleet, including the Breslaw and the Conquérant, and the British HMS Blonde under Admiral Edmund Lyons came to add their cannons. Some parts of the French and British batteries were even mixed and manipulated by gunners from both nations. The Russian fleet could not take part in the siege, being stationed in Malta, but Admiral Lodewijk van Heiden had long since offered to be at the disposal of General Maison.

On 30 October, early in the morning, twenty-five heavy gun batteries (including six field pieces, four howitzers, several mortars and an English bombard) opened fire. Within four hours, a large breach was opened in the ramparts. Then, an emissary came out with a white flag to negotiate the terms of the fort's surrender. General Maison replied that the terms had been negotiated at the beginning of the month at Patras. He added that he did not trust a group of besieged men who had not respected a first agreement to respect a second one. He gave the garrison half an hour to evacuate the fort, without arms or baggage. The aghas surrendered, but the fortress' resistance had cost 25 men of the French expedition killed or wounded.

=== Military results of the expedition ===
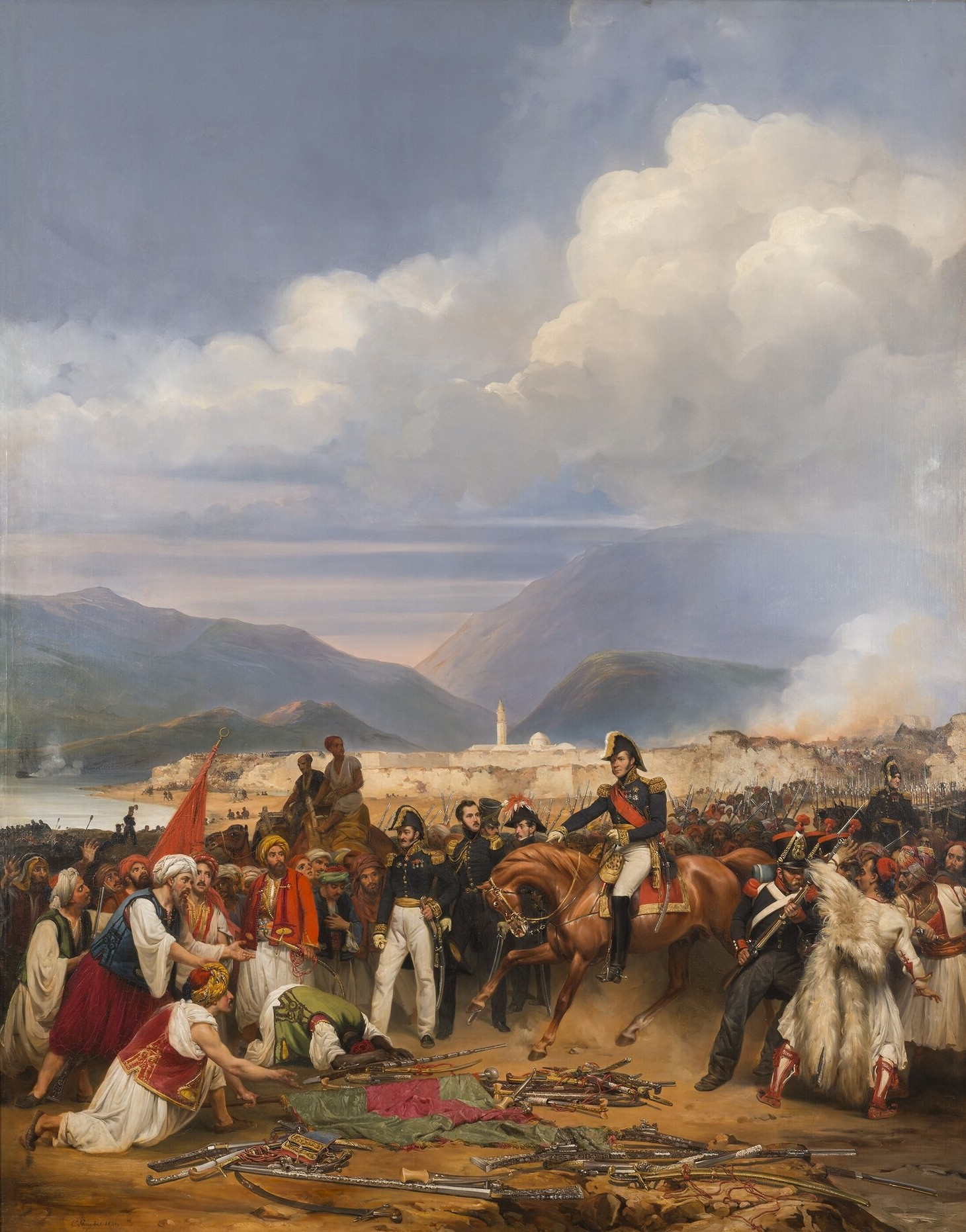
Surrender of the Castle of the Morea to General Nicolas Joseph Maison

On 5 November 1828, the last Turks and Egyptians had definitely left Morea. 2,500 men and their families were placed aboard French vessels headed for Smyrna. Therefore 26-27,000 men in total were forced to leave the country and the strongholds in a few days. The capture of the Morea strongholds by the French expeditionary force had only required a month:

Our operations were successful in all aspects: we do not find military glory there, without any doubt; but the object for which we have come, the liberation of Greece, will have been more successful and prompt; Morea will have been purged of its enemies. — Lieutenant-General Nicolas-Joseph Maison

The French and British ambassadors had set themselves up at Poros in September 1828 and invited Constantinople to send a diplomat there so as to conduct negotiations over the status of Greece. Because the Porte persisted in refusing to participate in conferences, General Maison explicitly suggested Greek Governor Ioannis Kapodistrias (on 5 October) pursuing military operations and extending them to Attica and Euboea. France supported this project and had for that initially given instructions to General Maison on 27 August 1828. But the British Prime Minister, the Duke of Wellington, opposed this plan (he wanted the new Greek state to be limited only to Peloponnese), thus it was left to the Greeks to drive out the Ottomans from these territories, with the understanding that the French army would only intervene if the Greeks found themselves in trouble.

The Ottoman Empire could no longer depend on Egyptian troops to hold Greece. The strategic situation now resembled that existing before 1825 and the landing of Ibrahim Pasha. Then, the Greek insurgents had triumphed on all fronts. After the Morea military expedition, the regular troops of the recently established Hellenic Armed Forces, only had to face the Turkish troops in Central Greece. Livadeia, gateway to Boeotia, was conquered at the beginning of November 1828 by the commander of the Army of Eastern Greece, Demetrios Ypsilantis. A counterattack by Mahmud Pasha from Euboea was repulsed in January 1829. The commander of the Army of Western Greece, Augustinos Kapodistrias, besieged and recaptured Naupaktos in April 1829 and the symbolic town of Messolonghi in May 1829. Ypsilantis recaptured Thebes on 21 May 1829 and defeated 7,000 Ottomans at the Battle of Petra (a narrow passage in Boeotia between Thebes and Livadeia) on 12 September 1829. This battle was significant as it was the first time the Greeks had fought victoriously on the field of battle as a regular army. The battle of Petra was the last of the Greek War of Independence.

However, it took the military victory of Russia in the Russo-Turkish War of 1828–29 and the Treaty of Adrianople, which was then ratified by the Treaty of Constantinople in July 1832, before the independence of Greece was recognized and guaranteed by the Great Powers. This Treaty of Constantinople thus marked the end of the Greek War of Independence. The territory of the new Kingdom of Greece, however, only extended over the regions liberated by the French and Greek troops: the Peloponnese, some islands and central Greece (the northern land border of the Kingdom was drawn along a line joining the cities of Arta and Volos).

=== French in the Peloponnese ===
The troops of the Morea Expedition, despite their disappointment at not being able to pursue their objective to liberate Greece, were gradually evacuated from January 1829 (General Higonet and General Sébastiani). Jacques Mangeart, Dr. Gaspard Roux and the brigade in which Eugène Cavaignac was serving embarked in the early days of April 1829. General Maison, following his promotion to Marshal of France on 22 February 1829 and General Durrieu, following his promotion to divisional general, did not leave until 22 May 1829; Captain Duheaume left on 4 August 1829.

Only a single brigade, so-called "of occupation", of 5,000 men (composed of the 27th, 42nd, 54th and 58th Line Infantry Regiments stationed in Navarino, Methoni and Patras) remained in the Peloponnese under the command of General Virgile Schneider. Fresh troops were sent from France to relieve the soldiers stationed in Greece; the 57th Line Infantry Regiment landed at Navarino on 25 July 1830. The French troops, first commanded by General Maison (1828–1829), then by General Schneider (1829–1831) and finally by General Guéhéneuc (1831–1833), did not remain idle during these nearly five years.

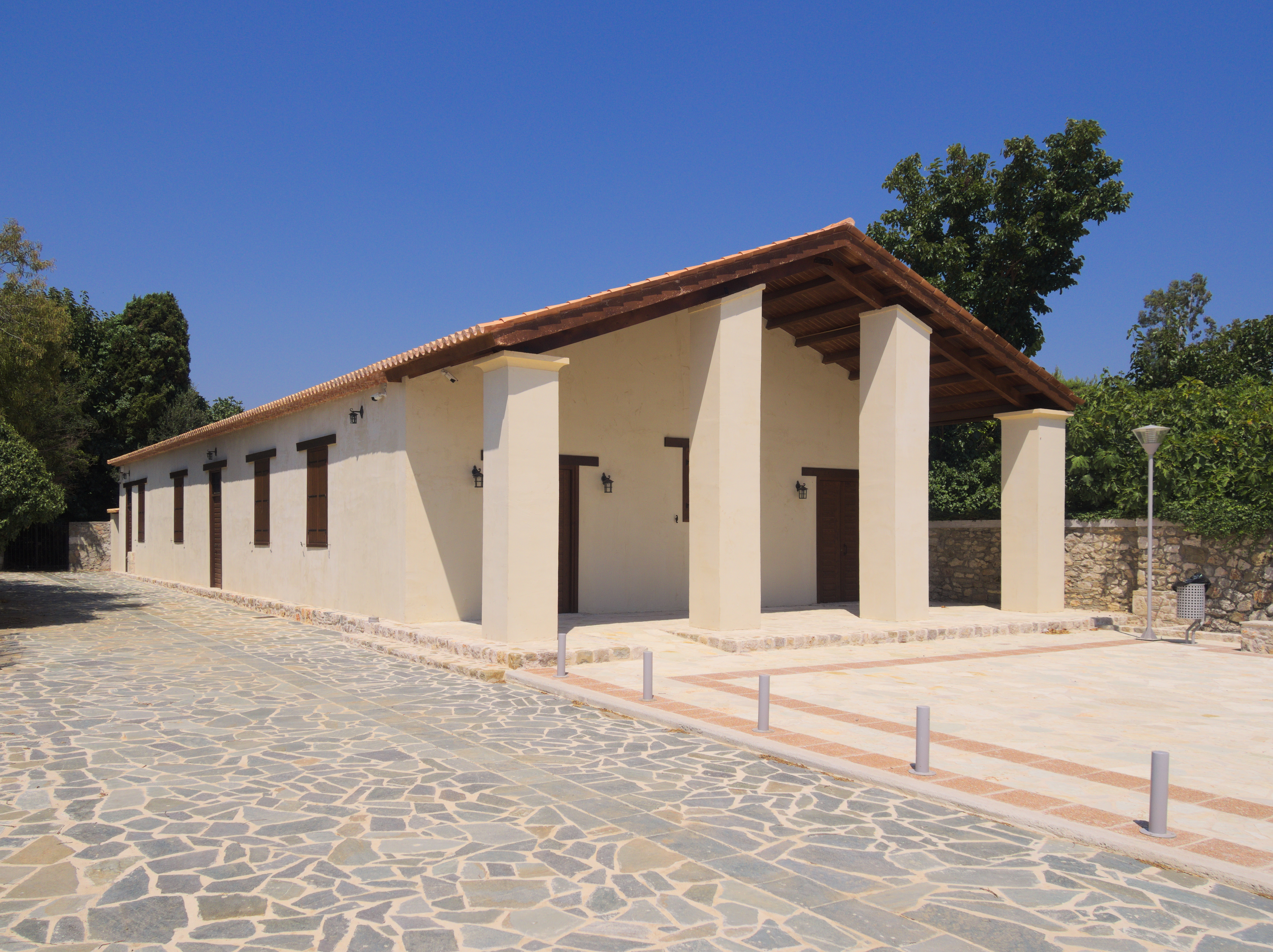
The Capodistrian School of Mutual Education of Methoni, built in February 1830 on plans designed by the commander of the military engineering, Lieutenant-Colonel Joseph-Victor Audoy

Fortifications were raised (like those at Methoni or Navarino), barracks were built (the "Maison's building" in Navarino's fortress, which houses nowadays the new archaeological museum of Pylos), bridges were constructed (such as those over the Pamissos River between Navarino and Kalamata), the road Navarino–Methoni was built (the first road of independent Greece, which is still used today), hospitals (in Navarino, Modon and Patras) and health commissions were established for the Greek population (as during the plague epidemic in the mountainous villages of Kalavryta and Vrachni in December 1828, which was contained by the General Higonet). Finally, many improvements were made to the Peloponnesian cities (schools, postal services, printing companies, bridges, squares, fountains, gardens, etc.). The military engineering commander of the Morea expedition, Lieutenant-Colonel Joseph-Victor Audoy, was commissioned by the Governor of Greece Ioannis Kapodistrias to design the first urban framework plan of the country's modern history. Audoy built from the spring of 1829 the new cities of Modon (today Methoni) and Navarino (today Pylos) outside the walls of the fortresses, on the model of the bastides of Southwest France (from where he originated) and of the cities of the Ionian Islands (which share common features, such as a central geometrical square bordered by covered galleries built with a succession of contiguous arches, each supported by a colonnade, as the arcades of Pylos or Corfu). He also built, between December 1829 and February 1830, the famous Capodistrian School of Mutual Education (the monitorial system) of Methoni. All these cities quickly repopulated and returned to their pre-war activity. The example of the rapid modernization of Patras, whose plans had just been drawn by the Captains of the French expedition Stamatis Voulgaris and Auguste-Théodore Garnot, is described at length in the Souvenirs of Jacques Mangeart, who came to the city with the Philhellene and Lieutenant-Colonel Maxime Raybaud to establish a printing company and found the Franco-Greek newspaper "Le Courrier d'Orient" in 1829.

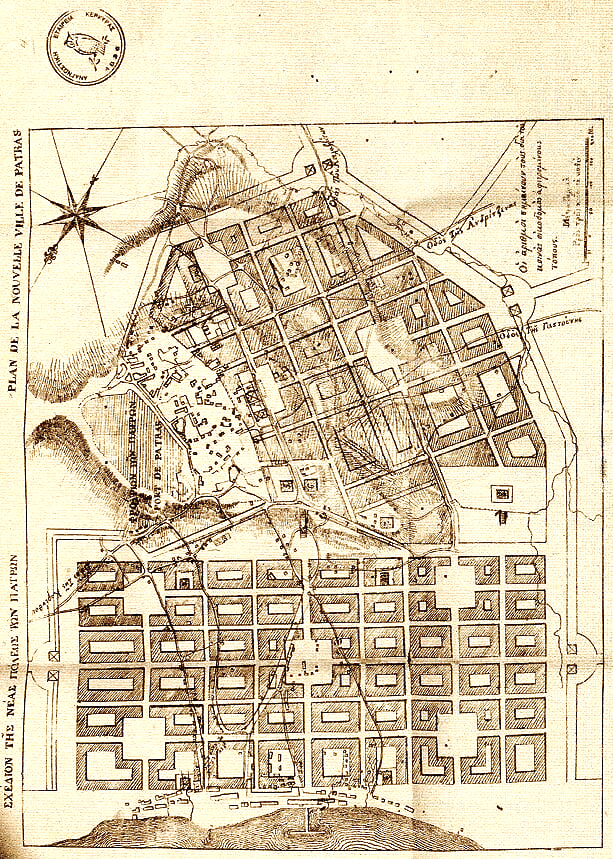
The first urban plan of Patras, designed in 1829 by Stamatis Voulgaris and Auguste-Théodore Garnot, Captains of the Morea expedition

The Governor of Greece Ioannis Kapodistrias, when he had come to Paris in October 1827 just before his arrival in Greece, asked the French government (and in particular his friend and employee of the Ministry of War, Count Nicolas de Loverdo) for advisers and French army officers to organise the army of the new Greek state. Consequently, on the recommendation of the French Ministry of War, the Captains of the General Staff Stamatis Voulgaris (a French officer of Greek origin and friend of Kapodistrias from childhood), of the military engineering Auguste-Théodore Garnot, of the artillery Jean-Henri-Pierre-Augustin Pauzié-Banne and of the topographic service Pierre Peytier, were sent to Greece in 1828, a few months before the arrival of the Morea military expedition, to which they were attached, in order to train young Greek military engineers. Captains Voulgaris and Garnot designed the urban plans of several Greek cities: Tripolitza, Corinth (which Garnot continued alone), Nafplio (Voulgaris reworked its urban plan and that of the refugee district Pronia) and Patras. Garnot was also commissioned by Kapodistrias to found the first military engineering corps in 1828, called the Corps of Fortification and Architecture Officers, whose mission was to build, maintain and improve fortifications, military and civilian buildings, bridges, roads and other constructions. The Captain of artillery Pauzié was responsible for founding the School of Artillery and then the Hellenic Central Military Academy, commonly known as the "Evelpidon School" in 1828, on the model of the French École Polytechnique. Finally, the map of the new Greek state was established by the Captain and engineer-geographer Pierre Peytier in 1832. At the same time, the Deputy Chief of Staff of the Morea Expedition, Colonel Camille Alphonse Trézel was promoted by Ioannis Kapodistrias, General and Commander of the regular army in 1829. Composed at that time of 2,688 men, General Trézel organized it "à la française", both for its administration and for its jurisdiction, for the training and for the advancement of the soldiers, and even for its uniforms which were the same than those of the French. In November 1829, General Trézel was replaced by General Gérard, who remained Commander of the regular Army until 1831. Finally, Governor Kapodistrias also commissioned in 1829 the geologist of the expedition Pierre Théodore Virlet d'Aoust to assess the possibility of digging a canal on the Isthmus of Corinth. Thus, from the first years of its independence, Greece established lasting military cooperation with France, who is still considered today as its traditional strategic ally.

To all these achievements made by the French military troops, the scientific work realised by the scientific commission of the Morea between the months of March and December 1829 should be added as well. The French troops definitively withdrew from Greece in August 1833, shortly after the arrival of King Otto of Greece and the Bavarian Auxiliary Corps, in the previous January. They were then replaced by the corps of the Royal Army composed of 3,500 Bavarian soldiers and officers.

=== Human cost of the expedition ===
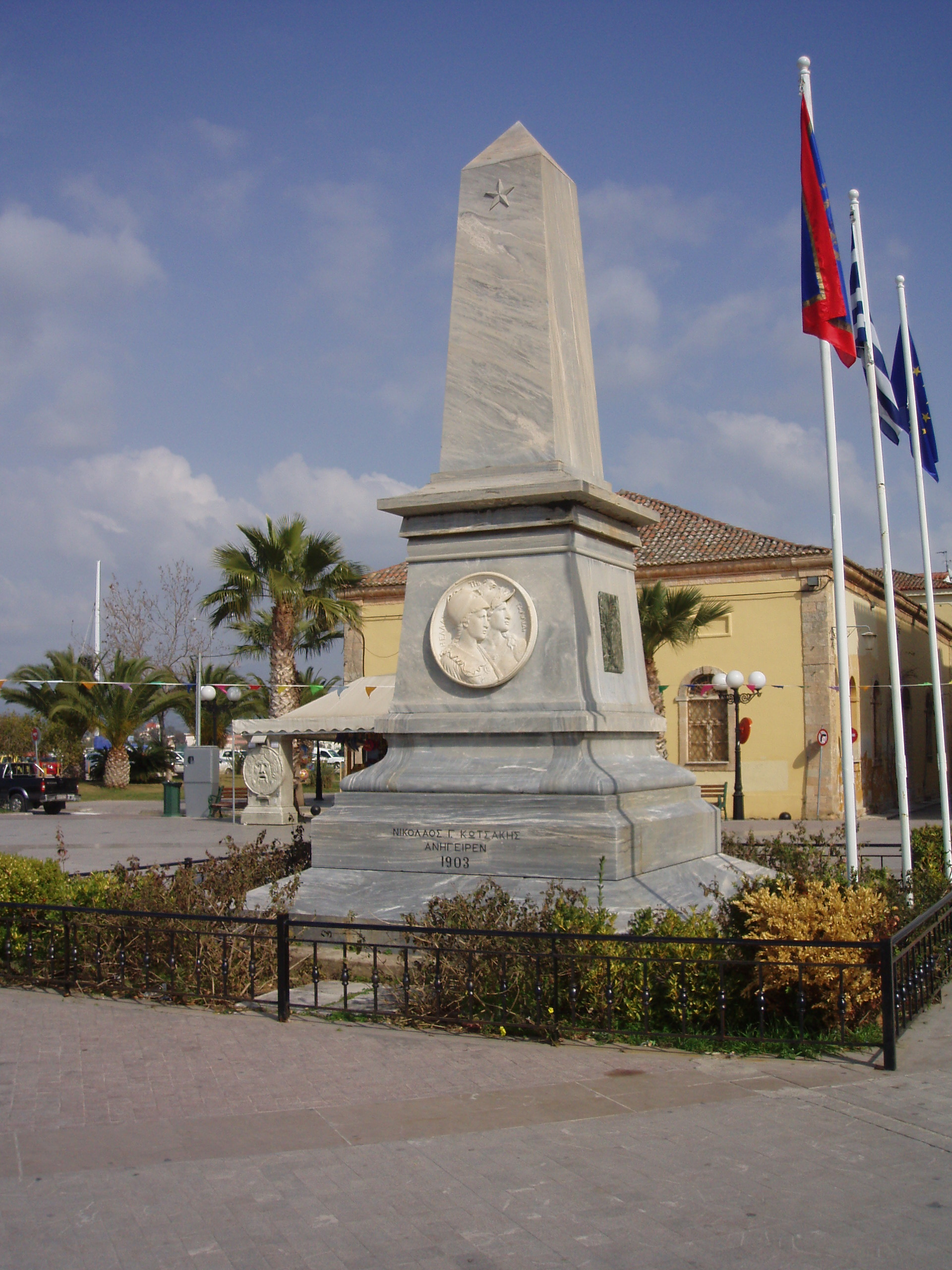
Memorial monument dedicated "to the memory of Marshal Maison, General Fabvier, Admiral de Rigny, and the French marines & soldiers who died for the Hellenic independence, homeland and freedom" (gray marble obelisk on Filellinon square in Nafplio)

Despite the brevity of the military operations and the small number of battles, the human cost of the French expedition was extremely heavy: between 1 September 1828 and 1 April 1829, the Chief Medical Officer of the expeditionary corps, Dr. Gaspard Roux, officially reported 4,766 illnesses and 1,000 deaths (numbers confirmed by Doctor Charles-Joseph Bastide, Surgeon-Major of the 16th Line Infantry Regiment).

Thus, almost a third of French troops were affected by fevers, diarrhea and dysentery, which had been mostly contracted between October and December 1828 in the camps established within the marshy plains of Petalidi, in the mouth of the river Djalova (in Navarino Bay) or in Patras. This epidemic of fever, characterized by a large majority of tertian fevers (occurring every two days), periodic, with a high rate of relapse, dazzling and accompanied by shivering, jaundice, convulsions, headache and neurological and digestive disorders, certainly corresponds to malaria (word that originates from medieval Italian: mala aria—"bad air"; the disease was formerly called ague or marsh fever due to its association with swamps and marshland) which was endemic to the region at that time (it was definitively eradicated in Greece in 1974). The epidemic began during the warm season, on 20 September 1828, marked its peak on 20 October (15 November in Patras), then subsided during the month of November, to completely stop in December 1828.

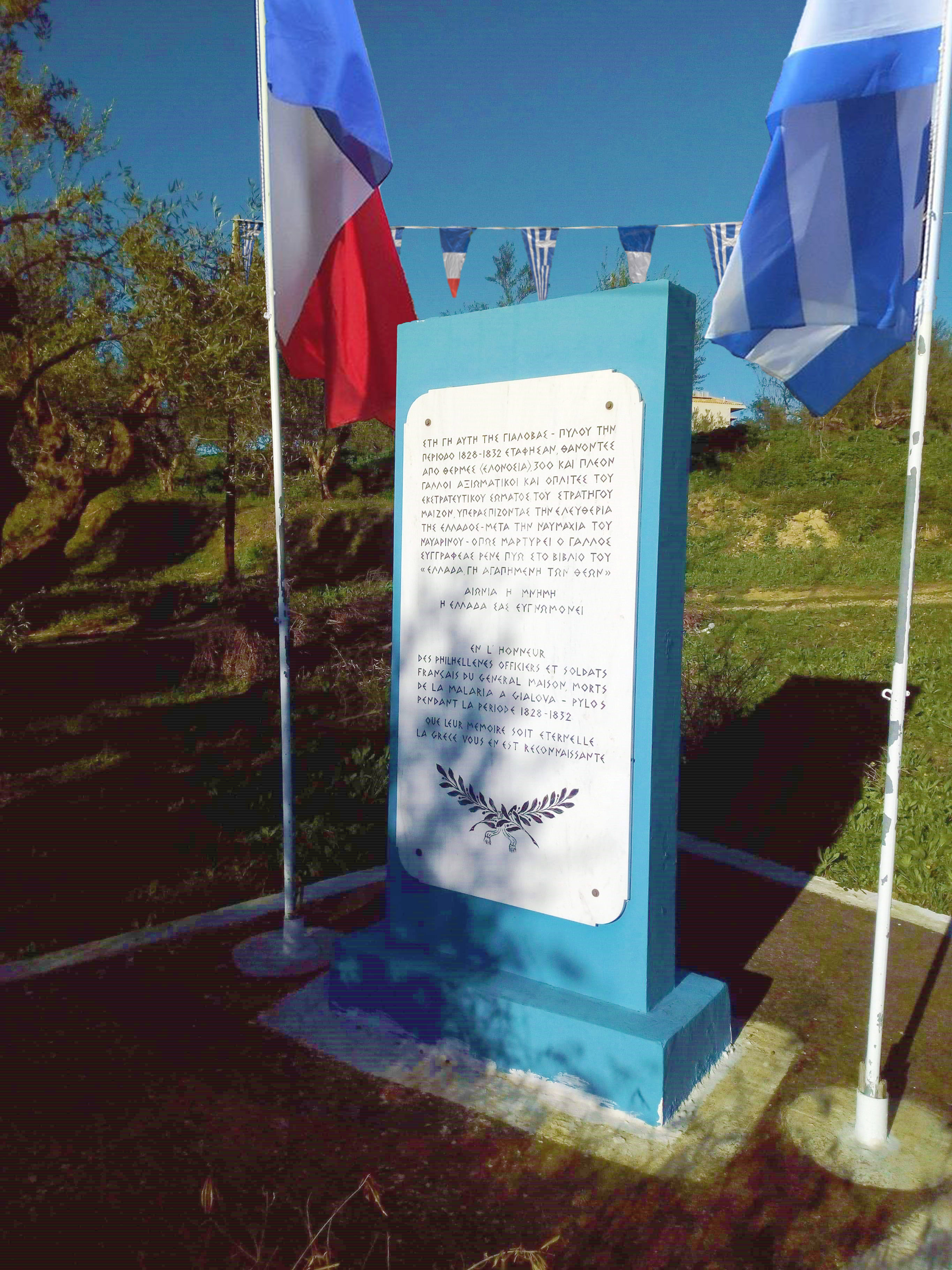
Memorial monument dedicated to the memory of the French soldiers and officers of the Morea expedition who died of malaria in Gialova

Although Doctor Roux recognized the main and deleterious influence of swamps in the spread of the disease, it was not until 1880 that its primary cause, the Plasmodium parasite (a single-celled microorganism), was discovered by the Charles Louis Alphonse Laveran—a French army doctor working in the military hospital of Constantine in Algeria— who observed parasites inside the red blood cells of infected people for the first time (Nobel Prize in 1907). Also, the evidence that female Anopheles mosquitoes, which neither Doctor Roux nor Doctor Bastide ever mention, are the vectors of malaria, came only in 1897 by the Scottish physician Sir Ronald Ross (Nobel Prize in 1902).

The doctors attributed the disease mainly to the proximity of the focal point of infection in lowlands and marshy places and to the harshness of the transitions in temperatures between day and night, and to a lesser extent, to the intensity of the multiple and arduous works, as well as in the excessive consumption of salted meat, of spirits, and of the muddy and brackish water of the region. The cooler weather of winter, the moving of the men into the fortresses's barracks, the immediate enforcement of strict hygiene and sanitation measures, the arrival of drugs from France, as well as the establishment of three military hospitals in Navarino, Methoni and Patras significantly reduced this loss of life. It should also be noted that the use by Doctor Roux of antipyretic febrifuges such as cinchona powder and quinine, purified for the first time only 8 years before, in 1820, by Pierre Joseph Pelletier and Joseph Bienaimé Caventou, resulted in most convincing therapeutic results.

However, the total number of deaths would increase significantly thereafter until the expedition's departure in 1833, especially following some suicides, duels, a few cases of "narcotism" following an overuse of alcoholic liquors, with the explosion of a gunpowder magazine within the fort of Navarino, which cost the lives of fifty soldiers on 19 November 1829, and following the Argos affair on January 16, 1833, which resulted in the death of three French soldiers. The scientific mission will also be strongly affected by malaria fever during the next summer in 1829. The total number of deaths in the Morea expedition is generally estimated, according to testimonies, at around 1,500.

Subsequently, memorials commemorating these fallen French soldiers were erected by the Greek and French states on the islet of Sphacteria in Navarino's bay (monument erected in May 1890) and in the cities of Gialova (monument erected in October 2007 on the exact site of the camp of Djalova), of Kalamata (in the church of Saint Nicholas Flarios) and of Nafplio (monument to the Philhellenes erected in 1903), where they can still be seen today.

== Scientific expedition ==
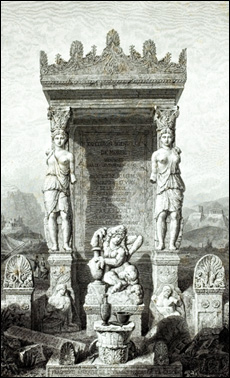
Frontispice of the Expédition scientifique de Morée by Abel Blouet

=== Establishment of the scientific mission ===
The Morea expedition was the second of the great military-scientific expeditions led by France in the first half of the 19th century. The first, used as a benchmark, had been that of Egypt, starting in 1798 (Commission des sciences et des arts); the last took place in Algeria from 1839 (Commission d'exploration scientifique d'Algérie). All three took place at the initiative of the French government and were placed under the guidance of a particular ministry (Foreign relations for Egypt, Interior for Morea and War for Algeria). The great scientific institutions were recruiting scholars (both civilians and from the military) and were specifying their missions, but in situ work was done in close cooperation with the army. The Commission of Sciences and Arts during Napoleon’s campaign in Egypt, and especially the publications that followed, had become a model. Since Greece was the other important region of antiquity considered the origin of Western civilisation (one of the philhellenes' principal arguments), it was decided, as mentioned by Abel Blouet, to:

...take advantage of the presence of our soldiers who were occupying Morea to send a scholarly commission. It did not have to equal that attached to the glory of Napoleon […] It did however need to render eminent services to the arts and sciences.

The Interior minister of King Charles X, the power behind the throne and real head of the government at the time, the Viscount of Martignac, charged six academicians of the Institut de France (Académie des Sciences: Georges Cuvier and Étienne Geoffroy Saint-Hilaire. Académie des Inscriptions et Belles-lettres: Charles-Benoît Hase and Desiré-Raoul Rochette. Académie des Beaux-arts: Jean-Nicolas Hyot and Jean-Antoine Letronne) to appoint the chief-officers and members of each section of the Scientific Committee. Jean-Baptiste Bory de Saint-Vincent was thus appointed director of the commission on December 9, 1828. They also determined the routes and objectives. As Bory will write later:

Messrs. De Martignac and Siméon had asked me expressly not to restrict my observations to Flies and Herbs, but to extend them to places and to men

The expedition, composed of nineteen scientists, was divided into three sections (Physical Sciences, Archaeology, Architecture-Sculpture), each placed under the direction of Jean-Baptiste Bory de Saint-Vincent (Physical Sciences section), Léon-Jean-Joseph Dubois (Archaeology section) and Guillaume-Abel Blouet (Architecture and Sculpture section). The painter Amaury-Duval gave portraits of these three directors in his Souvenirs (1829-1830) written in 1885.

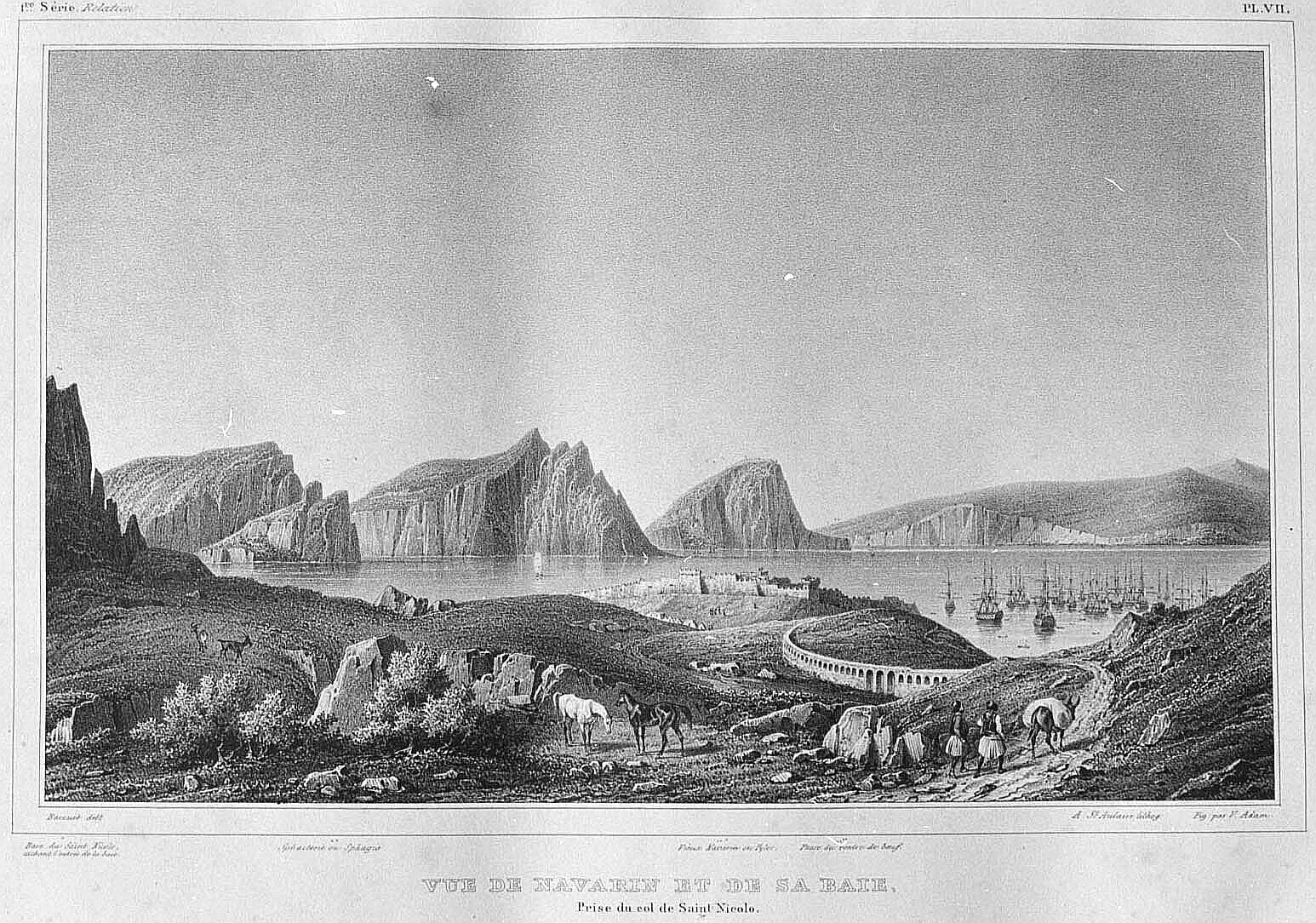
View of Navarino and its Bay shortly after the arrival of the scientific commission in Greece (by Prosper Baccuet)

The members of the scientific expedition embarked on February 10, 1829 in Toulon aboard the frigate Cybèle (commanded by the frigate captain, de Robillard) and, after 21 days of a rather tumultuous crossing of the Mediterranean for the members of the expedition, they landed on March 3, 1829 at Navarino. While in Egypt and Algeria, scientific work was done under the army's protection, in Morea, while scientific exploration had barely begun, the first troops already started embarking for France from the first days of April 1829. The army merely provided logistical support: tents, stakes, tools, liquid containers, large pots and sacks; in a word, everything that could be found for us to use in the army's storehouses.

Shortly after the arrival of the scientific commission in Greece and its installation in its headquarters in Modon, the governor of the First Hellenic Republic Ioannis Kapodistrias came to meet its members on April 11, 1829. He already had the opportunity to meet on his way, between Argos and Tripolizza, Edgar Quinet who had then already parted from the rest of the commission and was heading to Argolida. The historian and future French politician presents on this occasion portraits of the president and his aides-de-camp, the heroes of Greek independence Kolokotronis and Nikitaras, who all left strong impression on him. The president also met Abel Blouet a little further on his journey, in the vicinity of Corone. A great dinner was organised at Modon, which brought together for the last time before the expeditionary force returned to France: President Kapodistrias, Marshal Maison, the Greek and French officers and principal chiefs (Kolokotronis, Nikitaras, Makriyannis, Kallergis, Fabvier, etc.), and all members of the scientific commission. Bory de Saint-Vincent introduced the members of his section to the president, then both had the opportunity to discuss at length questions of international diplomacy. They met again later in Argos, Nafplion and Aegina. The painter Amaury-Duval, also noted the special devotion of the Greek President to his project to develop schools of mutual education (the monitorial system) in the country. In general, texts describing the multiple meetings between the members of the scientific commission and the Greek president invariably show reciprocal respect and mutual esteem.

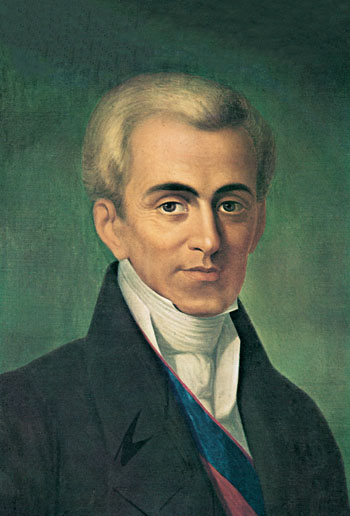
The Greek President Ioannis Kapodistrias (Athens National Museum)

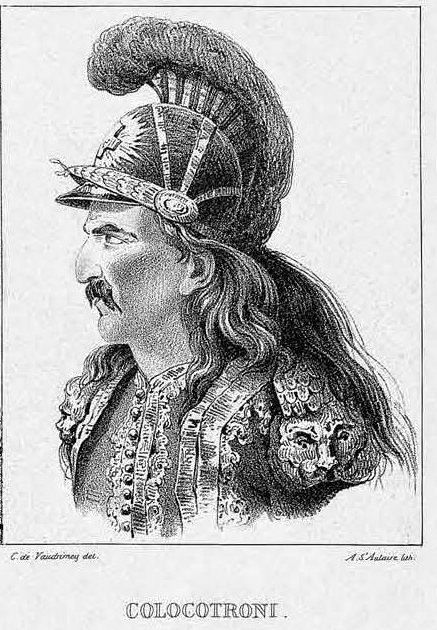
Theodoros Kolokotronis (by captain de Vaudrimey of the Morea expedition)

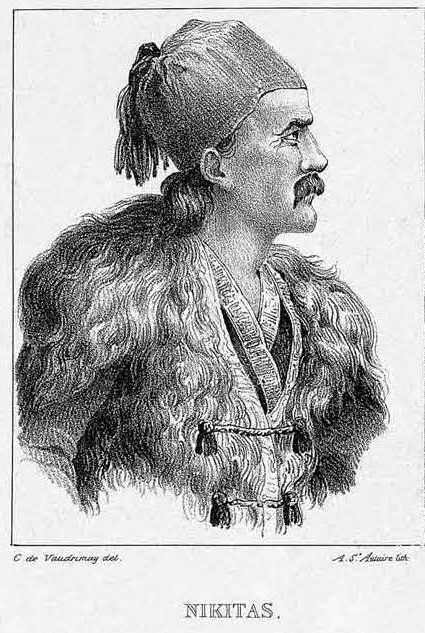
Nikitas (Nikitaras) Stamatelopoulos (by captain de Vaudrimey of the Morea expedition)

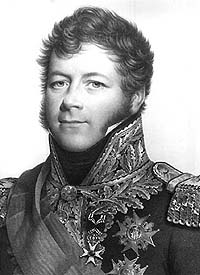
Nicolas-Joseph Maison, Marshal of France, commander of the military expedition of Morea (by Aloys Senefelder)

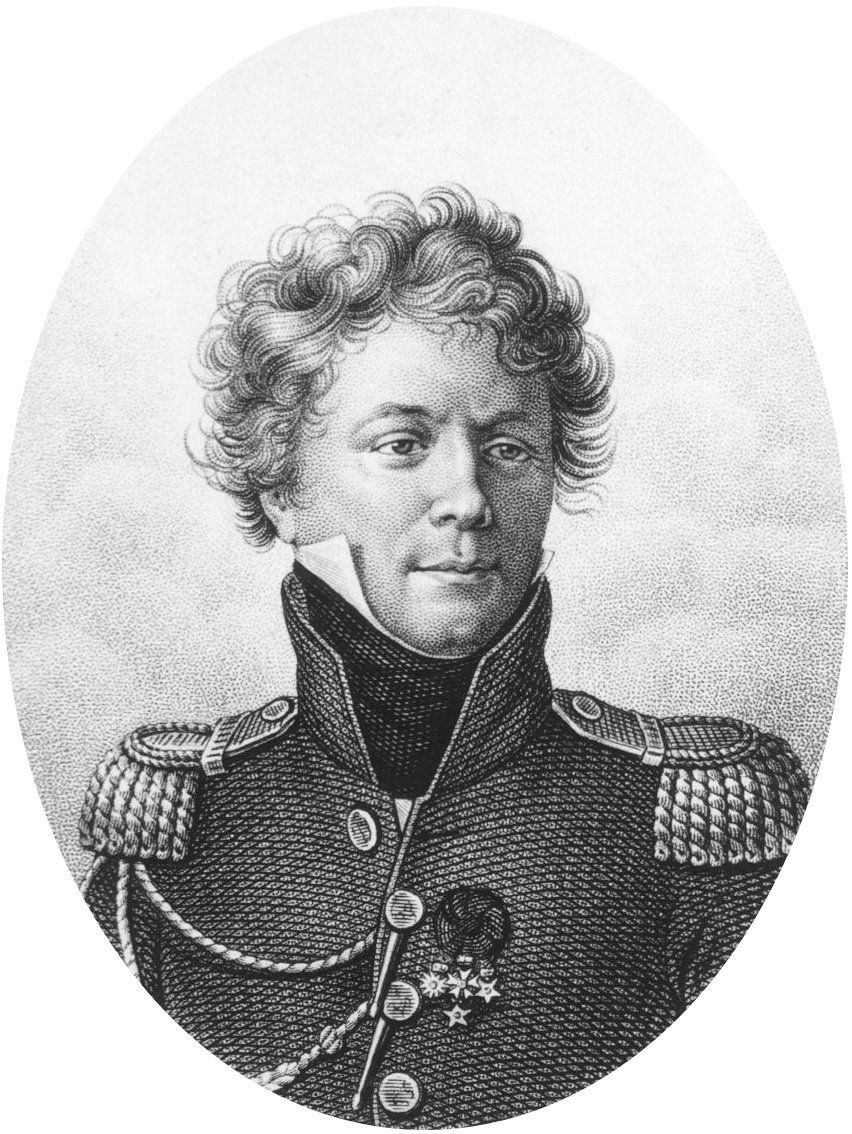
Jean-Baptiste Bory de Saint-Vincent, director of the scientific expedition of Morea (by Ambroise Tardieu)

=== Physical Sciences section ===
This section, supervised at the French Academy of Sciences by Georges Cuvier and Étienne Geoffroy Saint-Hilaire, included several sciences: on the one hand botany (Jean Baptiste Bory de Saint-Vincent, Louis Despreaux Saint-Sauveur, accompanied by the painter Prosper Baccuet) and zoology (Gaspard-Auguste Brullé, Gabriel Bibron, Sextius Delaunay and Antoine Vincent Pector), and on the other hand geography (Pierre Peytier, Pierre M. Lapie and Aristide-Camille Servier) and geology (Pierre Théodore Virlet d’Aoust, Émile Puillon Boblaye and Gérard Paul Deshayes).

==== Geography and Geology ====
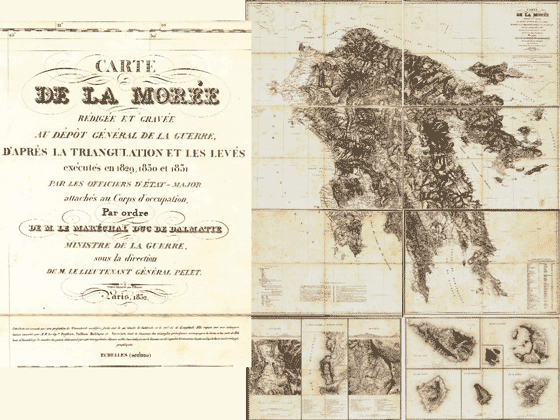
The Map of the Morea of 1832 (by Captain Pierre Peytier), the first map of the Greek territory ever drawn scientifically and according to geodetic principles

One of the first objectives fixed by the French government had been to draw precise maps of the Peloponnese, with a scientific purpose, but also for economic and military reasons. The Minister of War, the Vicomte de Caux, had written to General Maison on January 6, 1829: All the maps of Greece are very imperfect and were drawn up based on more or less inaccurate templates; it is thus essential to fix them. Not only will geography be enriched by this research, but we will in the process support France's commercial interests by making her relations easier, and it will above all be useful for our ground and naval forces, who may find themselves involved in this part of Europe. The only maps available at the time were those made by Jean-Denis Barbié du Bocage (1808, in 1:500,000 scale), whose map was relatively imperfect, and that of Pierre Lapie (1826, in 1:400,000 scale), which was more exact for a detailed layout and was used by the members of the expedition.

Captain Pierre Peytier, of the topographic service in the French army, had already been invited to Greece by Governor Ioannis Kapodistrias when the latter had come to Paris in October 1827 to ask the French government for advisers and French army officers to organise the army of the new Greek state. Kapodistrias also requested the fixing of the map of Greece. Consequently, on the recommendation of the French Ministry of War, Peytier and three other officers were sent to Greece in May 1828, four months before the Morea military expedition, to train young Greek topographical engineers (including the urban engineer Stamatis Voulgaris, a staff captain in the French army, but of Greek origin). Peytier himself was to draw the plans for the city of Corinth and the map of the Peloponnese. When the scientific expedition of the Morea landed at Navarino in the Peloponnese on March 3, 1829, Peytier was attached to it.

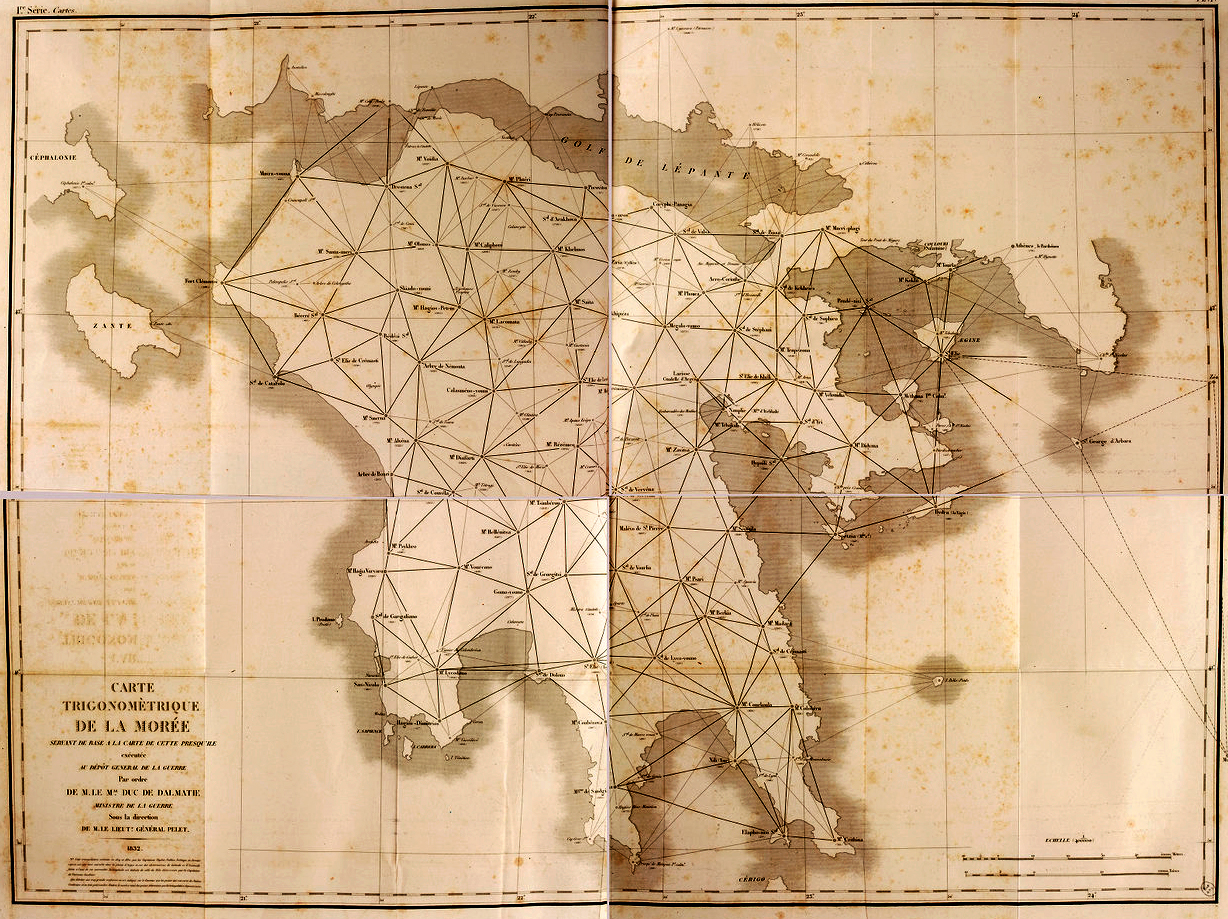
Trigonometry of the Morea (by Peytier, Puillon Boblaye and Servier)

As soon as March, a base of 3,500 meters had been traced in the Argolis, from one point at the ruins of Tiryns to a point at a ruined house in the village of Aria. This was intended to serve as a point of departure in all the triangulation operations for topographic and geodetic readings in the Peloponnese. Peytier and Puillon-Boblaye proceeded to perform numerous verifications on the base and on the rulers used. The margin of error was thus reduced to 1 meter for every 15 kilometers. The longitude and latitude of the base point at Tiryns were read and checked, so that again the margin of error was reduced as far as possible to an estimated 0.2 seconds. One hundred thirty four geodetic stations were set up on the peninsula's mountains, as well as on Aegina, Hydra and Nafplion. Equilateral triangles whose sides measured about 20 km were drawn, while the angles were measured with Gambey's theodolites. However, after the departure of the scientific mission from Greece, and although he fell ill with fever five times, Peytier remained there alone until 31 July 1831 to complete the trigonometric, topographic and statistical work for the establishment of the map of the Morea.

The Map of 1832, very precisely drawn at a 1:200,000 scale on 6 sheets (plus two sheets depicting some of the islands of the Cyclades), was the first map of the Greek territory ever made according to scientifically and geodetic principles.

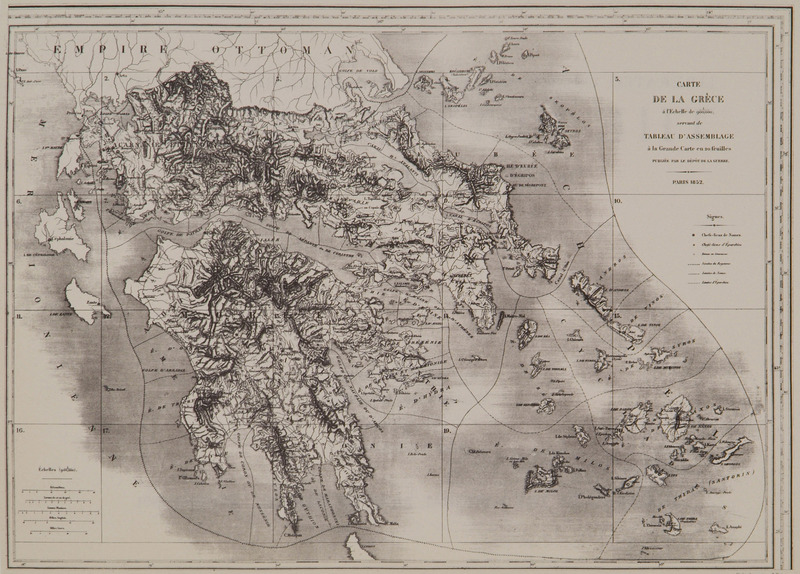
The Map of the Kingdom of Greece of 1852 (by Captain Pierre Peytier)

After the assassination of Kapodistrias in October 1831, Peytier's activity was almost completely hampered by the civil war which tore the country apart. King Otto I of Greece, who arrived in January 1833, requested of France that the topographic brigade be responsible for surveying the map of the whole kingdom. Peytier returned to Greece on 28 March 1833 and remained there until March 1836 to direct most of the work for the preparation of the complete map. Some topographic engineers remained until 1849 under the direction of Captain Soitoux for additional reconnaissance. This Map of 1852, also in 1:200,000 scale, was definitively published under Peytier's direction in 1852. Until the publication by the Geographical Service of the Hellenic Army after 1945 of the current map in 1:50,000 scale, this map from 1852 remained the only one which covered the entire territory of Greece. The French geographer and Greek specialist, Michel Sivignion indicates that the map depicts, for the first time, an exact rendering of the topography, of the layout of the rivers, of the height of the mountains, and also of the distribution of inhabited places and of the size of their populations. Beyond this technical aspect, it marks the political territory of independent Greece, its official representation, and its being taken possession of by the authorities of the territory, the limits of which are fixed.

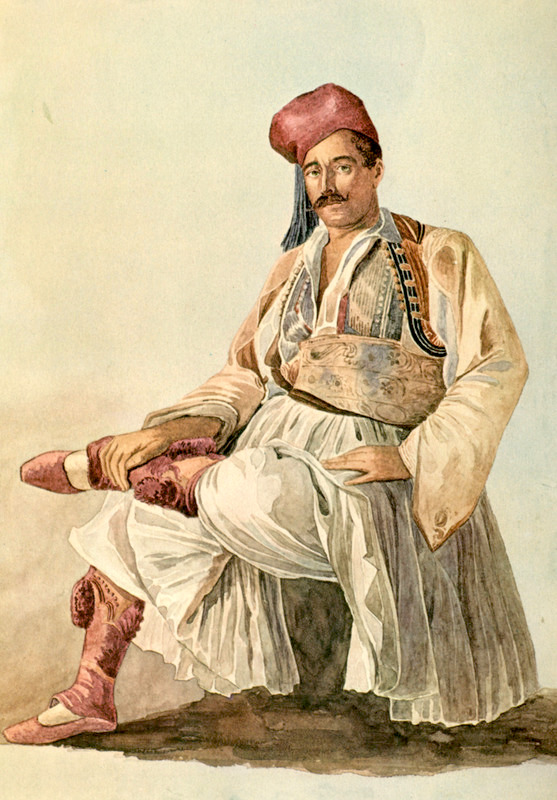
Greek chieftain (by Pierre Peytier)

Peytier also left an album which he himself composed with his pencil drawings, sepias and watercolours depicting city views, monuments, costumes and inhabitants of Greece at the time. He used an artistic style that avoided idealization for the benefit of scientific fidelity and precision, which fully revealed the topographer that he was.

The Governor of Greece Ioannis Kapodistrias also commissioned Pierre Théodore Virlet d'Aoust to assess the possibility of digging a canal on the isthmus of Corinth, to save ships the 700 kilometres (430 mi) journey around the Peloponnese and the dangerous pass of the capes Maleas and Matapan (Tainaron) south of the peninsula. Virlet d'Aoust gave him an estimate of the project, which, without taking into account interest on its financing, was assessed to around 40 million gold francs of the time. This expense, too considerable for the Hellenic government alone, led him to give up the initiation of the works. Although the project was never carried out, Virlet still oprovided the Greek government its potential route, which followed that established by the Romans between Loutraki and Kalamaki, and which was indicated on the Geological Map in 1:200,000 scale of the scientific expedition. It was not until 1893 that the Corinth Canal was finally opened.

==== Botany and Zoology ====
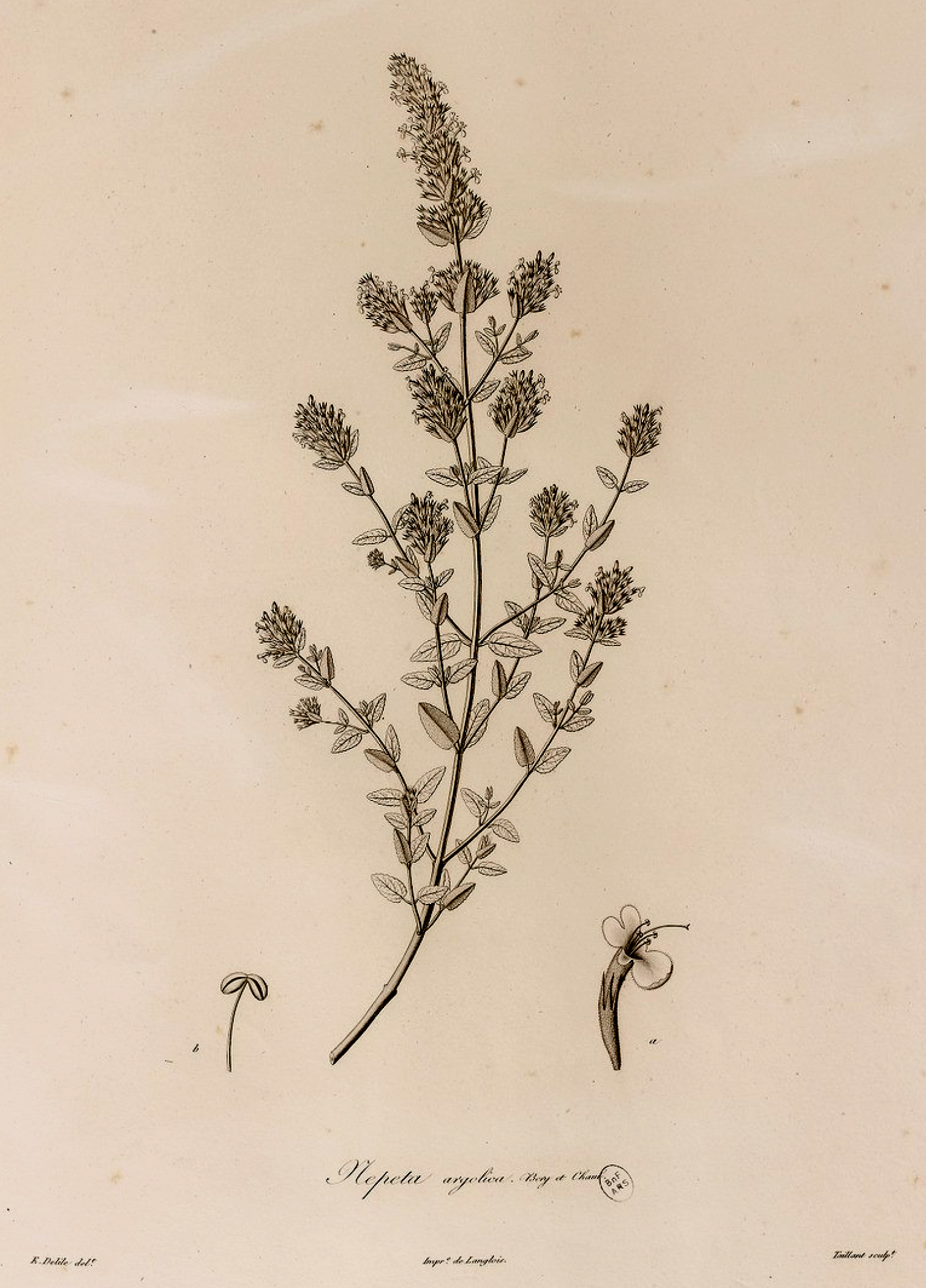
Example of a plate devoted to botany in Expédition de Morée by Bory de Saint-Vincent (Nepeta argolica Bory & Chaub)

Jean Baptiste Bory de Saint-Vincent led the Morea scientific expedition, and made detailed botanical observations. He gathered a multitude of specimens: Flore de Morée (1832) lists 1,550 plants, of which 33 were orchids and 91 were grasses (just 42 species had not yet been described); Nouvelle Flore du Péloponnèse et des Cyclades (1838) described 1,821 species. In Morea, Bory de Saint-Vincent limited himself to collecting only the plants. He proceeded to their classification, identification and description upon his return to the Museum d'Histoire Naturelle de Paris. He was then helped, not by his collaborators from Greece, but by the eminent botanists of his time, Louis Athanase Chaubard, Jean-Baptiste Fauché and Adolphe-Théodore Brongniart. Similarly, the well-known naturalists Étienne and his son Isidore Geoffroy Saint-Hilaire helped him to write and edit the expedition's scientific works, under the supervision of Georges Cuvier at the institute. As the gathering process went along, they sent the plants, as well as birds and fish, to France.

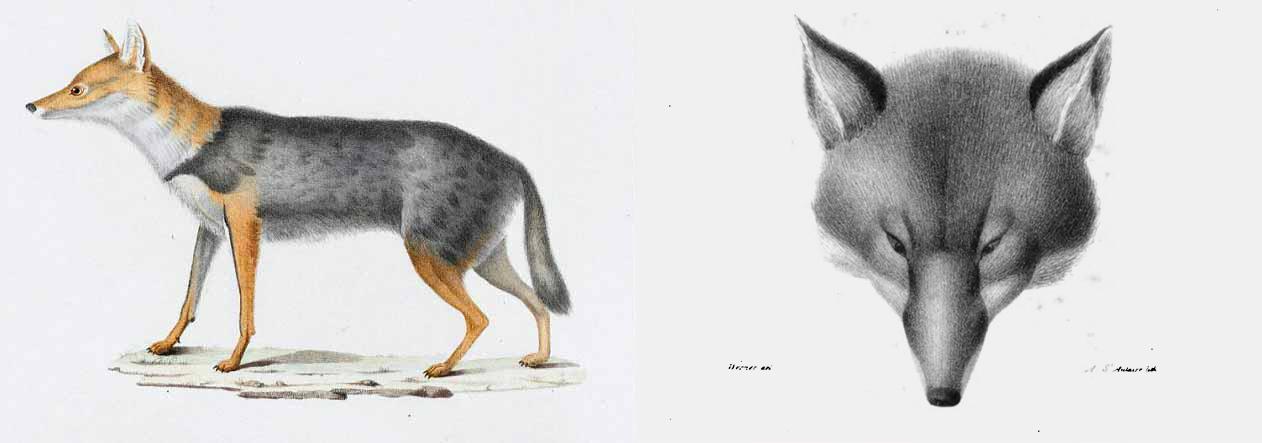
The jackal of the Morea (Canis aureus moreoticus) described for the first time by the Morea Expedition (Lithographs by Jean-Gabriel Prêtre, published by Bory de Saint-Vincent)

In zoological matters, relatively few new species were described. However, the Morea expedition identified for the first time the species of jackal, Canis aureus, or golden jackal, that populates the region. Although earlier travel narratives had mentioned its presence, these were not considered trustworthy. Moreover, the subspecies described by the Morea Expedition was endemic to the region: Bory de Saint-Vincent gave it the name of the Morea (Canis aureus moreoticus) and brought back to the Museum of Natural History in Paris some pelts and a skull.

Bory was accompanied during his explorations of the Peloponnese by the zoologists Gabriel Bibron, Sextius Delaunay and Antoine Vincent Pector, by the entomologist Gaspard-Auguste Brullé, by the conchologist, malacologist and geologist Gérard Paul Deshayes, by the geologists Pierre Théodore Virlet d’Aoust and Émile Puillon Boblaye, and by the botanist specialist of cryptogams, lichens, fungi and algae, Louis Despreaux Saint-Sauveur. The painter Prosper Baccuet, also accompanying Bory, made illustrations of the landscapes visited that were published in Bory's Relation de l'Expédition scientifique de Morée (1836) and Atlas (1835).

=== Archaeology section ===
This section, supervised at the Académie des Inscriptions et Belles-lettres by Charles-Benoît Hase and Desiré-Raoul Rochette, was composed of the archaeologists Léon-Jean-Joseph Dubois (director) and Charles Lenormant (assistant-director), by the historian Edgar Quinet and by the painters Eugène-Emmanuel Amaury-Duval and Pierre Félix Trézel. The Greek writer and linguist Michel Schinas accompanied them.

Its mission was to locate eighty ancient sites (in Achaia, Arcadia, Elis and Messinia) using descriptions in ancient literature. Its itinerary followed that of Pausanias the Periegete. The sites had to be precisely located by precise triangulation, then, with the help of the architectural section, the archaeology section had to make the plans (general and by building), to draw and cast the buildings and their decorations, and to start excavations to clear buildings and antiquities. Byzantine monasteries had been added to the itinerary, and the section was tasked with attempting to buy some manuscripts from them.

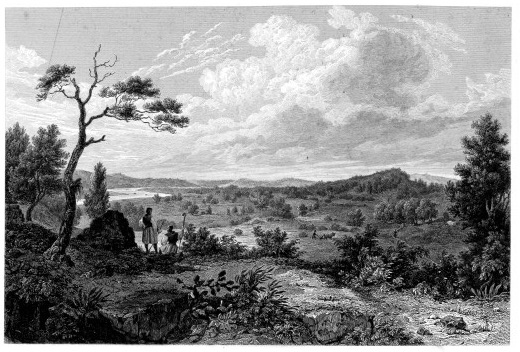
Olympia in 1829 as seen by the Morea expedition

The archaeology section, however, did not succeed in achieving the ambitious program originally set. Its members suffered from numerous diseases and fevers and began quarreling. Charles Lenormant, for instance, when he learned that he was under the orders of Dubois, or at least that he was going to go along with him, did not think he should accept this position with a man who was his subordinate at the Louvre (he was just returning from the Egyptian archaeological expedition organised by Jean-François Champollion in 1828); consequently he made the trip as an amateur and alone. Edgar Quinet, the prominent French historian, intellectual and politician, who did not care to be a subordinate nor for collaborating on a book—he already intended to publish one by himself—told Dubois that he did not have to count on him, and that he would go alone. Quinet visited Piraeus on 21 April 1829, thence reaching Athens. He saw the Cyclades in May, starting with Syros. Being sick, he returned to France on 5 June, and his Grèce moderne et ses rapports avec l’Antiquité was published in September 1831. The sculptor and Hellenist Jean-Baptiste Vietty from Lyon, who belonged to the Architecture and Sculpture section), tolerating with difficulty his subordinate role in the expedition, also separated from his companions after he arrived in Greece and travelled through the Peloponnese separately. He pursued his research in Greece under extremely difficult material conditions until August 1831, long after the expedition had returned to France at the end of 1829. Amaury-Duval later gave some picturesque portraits of both Quinet and Vietty in his Souvenirs (1829-1830).

Thus, the members of this section each left in different directions, with Dubois failing to impose his authority and to prevent them doing so, a fact that elicited rather sarcastic comments from Baron Georges Cuvier, the Commissioner of the Academie who was supervising the "competing" Physical Sciences section. Their results will never be published. The main archaeological work was performed then by the Architecture and Sculpture section, which the remaining members of the Archaeology section joined.

=== Architecture and Sculpture section ===
This section had been established at the Académie des Beaux-arts by Jean-Nicolas Hyot and Jean-Antoine Letronne, who designated the architect Guillaume-Abel Blouet as its head. To assist him, the Institut had also sent the archaeologist Amable Ravoisié and the painters Frédéric de Gournay and Pierre Achille Poirot. The archaeologist Léon-Jean-Joseph Dubois and the painters Pierre Félix Trézel and Amaury-Duval joined them after the dispersion of the archaeology section.

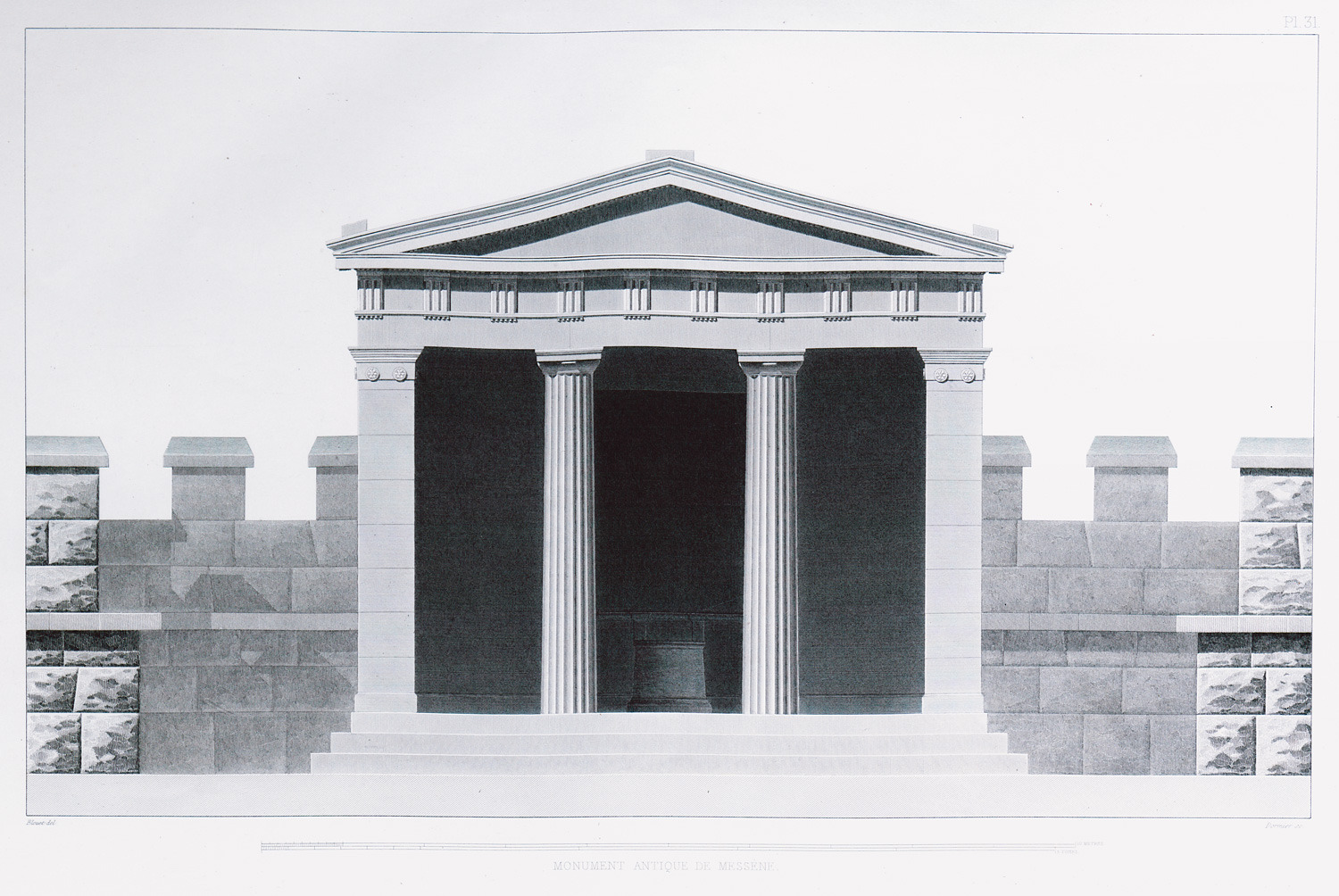
Elevation of the Heroon at the stadium of ancient Messene (reconstruction by Guillaume-Abel Blouet)

The architect Jean-Nicolas Huyot gave very precise instructions to this section. Possessed of a wide-ranging experience formed in Italy, Greece, Egypt and the Middle East, and under the influence of engineers, he asked them to keep an authentic diary of their excavations where precise measurements read off watches and compasses should be written down, to draw a map of the region they travelled, and to describe the layout of the terrain.

==== Itineraries ====
The publication of the works on archaeology and art followed the same pattern as with the publication of the works on physical and natural sciences: that of an itinerary with descriptions of the roads travelled, noteworthy monuments along these routes, and descriptions of their destinations. Hence, volume I of Expédition de Morée. Section des Beaux Arts describes Navarino (pp. 1–7) with six pages of drawings (fountains, churches, the fortress of Navarino and the city of Nestor); then on pages 9–10, the road Navarino-Methoni is detailed with four pages of plates (a church in ruins and its frescoes, but also bucolic landscapes reminding the reader that the scene is not so far from Arcadia); and finally three pages on Methoni with four pages of drawings.

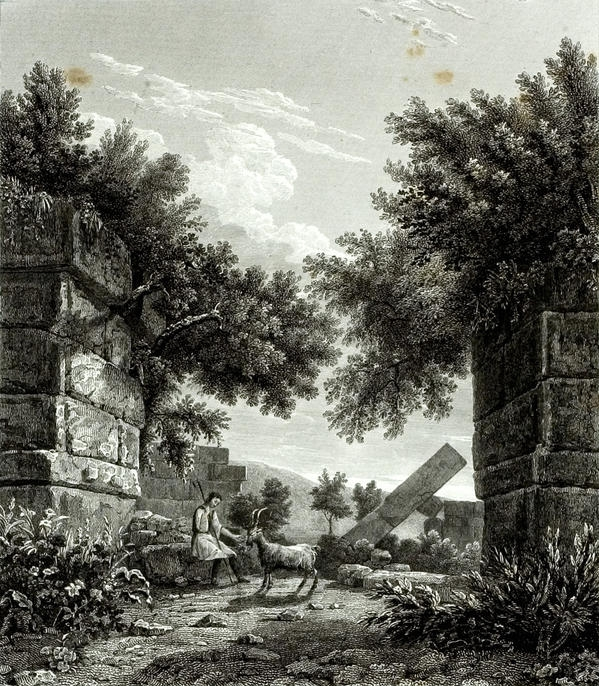
The Arcadian Gate in ancient Messene in the “shepherd of Arcadia” style and influenced by Hubert Robert

The bucolic landscapes were rather close to the "norm" that Hubert Robert had proposed for the depictions of Greece. The presence of the troops from the expeditionary corps was important, alternating with that of the Greek shepherds: "[...] their generous hospitality and simple and innocent manners reminded us of the beautiful period of pastoral life which fiction calls the Golden age, and which seemed to offer the real characters of the Theocritus' and Virgil's eclogues."

The archaeological expedition travelled through Navarino (Pylos), Methoni, Koroni, Messene and Olympia (described in the publication's first volume); Bassae, Megalopolis, Sparta, Mantineia, Argos, Mycenae, Tiryns and Nafplion (subjects of the second volume); the Cyclades (Syros, Kea, Mykonos, Delos, Naxos and Milos), Sounion, Aegina, Epidaurus, Troezen, Nemea, Corinth, Sicyon, Patras, Elis, Kalamata, the Mani Peninsula, Cape Matapan, Monemvasia, Athens, Salamis Island and Eleusis (covered in volume III).

==== Methods of exploration and identification of Ancient Pylos ====
The artistic and archaeological exploration of the Peloponnese unfolded in the manner in which archaeological research was then conducted in Greece. The first step always involved an attempt to make an on-site check (a form of autopsy in the manner of Herodotus) against the texts of ancient authors like Homer, Pausanias or Strabo. Thus, at Cape Coryphasium near Navarino (Paleokastro, Old Navarino or Zonchio), the location of the city of the Homeric King Nestor, the famous Pylos, was determined for the first time from the adjectives "inaccessible" and "sandy" (ἠμαθόεις) used in the Iliad and the Odyssey (the palace of Nestor, located higher up in the land, was not discovered until 1939 by the American archaeologist Carl Blegen). Blouet added: "These Hellenic constructions, which no modern traveller had yet mentioned, and which I had noticed in a previous visit, were for us an important discovery and a very-plausible reason to convince us that we saw the Pylos of Messinia." Similarly, a little further, he says about the city of Modon (Methoni), the Homeric city of Pedasus: "the ancient remains of the port, whose description agrees perfectly with that of Pausanias, are sufficient to determine with certainty the location of the ancient city."

==== First archaeological excavations of the Ancient Messene ====
Having explored Navarino, Methoni and Koroni, the members of the section went to the ancient city of Messene (founded in 369 BC by the Theban general Epaminondas after his victory over Sparta at Leuctra), located on the slopes of Mounts Ithome and Eva. They spent a full month there from April 10, 1829, where they were warmly welcomed by the inhabitants of the village of Mavrommati. They were the first archaeologists to carry out scientific excavations on this site of classical Greece.

They found there the famous fortified and crenelated surrounding walls of Epaminondas in a perfect state of preservation. There were two monumental portals in the wall, one of which, having a lintel or architrave of an extraordinary 6 meters in length, was described by Blouet as "perhaps the most beautiful in all of Greece". This enclosure initially allowed them to delimit the site and to "give a general plan of Messene with the most meticulous and precise topographic details." Then, they proceeded to the proper excavation of the archaeological site. They unearthed for the first time many fragments of stadium bleachers, drum sections and capitals of columns, porticoes, altars, bas-reliefs, sculptures and inscriptions (noted by Charles Lenormant, still present at that time). These excavations, carried out by means of dug trenches, enabled them to determine the precise plans of the foundations of the monuments and thus to propose restored models of the stadium of Messene and its heroon, as well as the small theater or ekklesiasterion. However, they did not find all monuments, including the great theater and the Arsinoë fountain. Only the Clepsydra fountain (where according to Pausanias, Zeus as a child was washed by the nymphs Ithome and Neda), located higher in the village of Mavrommati, was described and drawn.

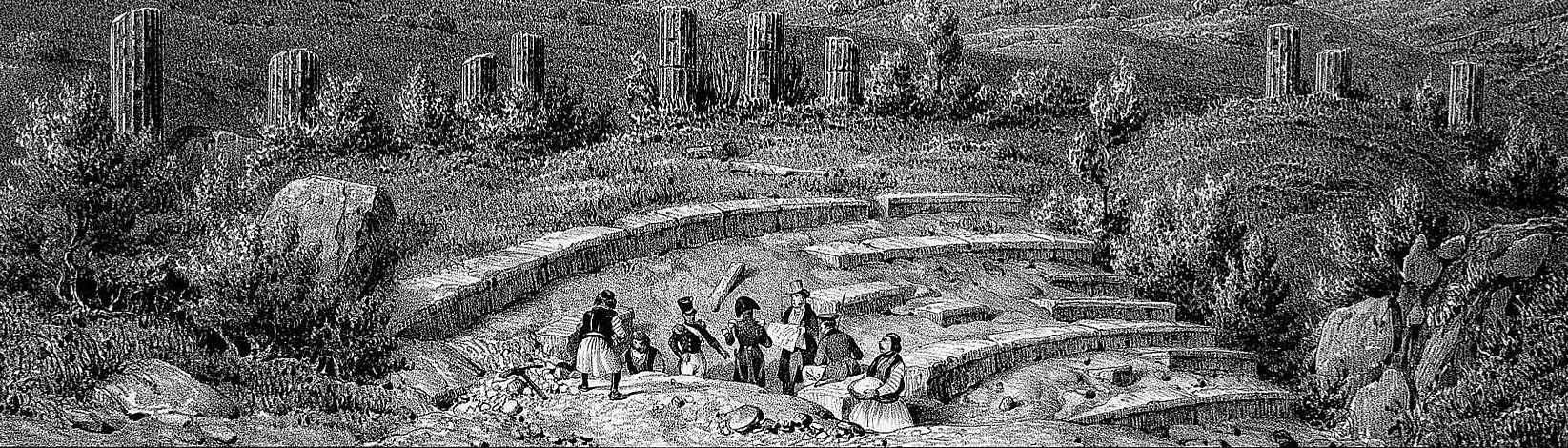
The members of the scientific commission of the Morea Expedition studying the ruins of the stadium of ancient Messene (detail of a lithograph by Prosper Baccuet)

==== First archaeological excavations of Olympia and the discovery of the temple of Olympian Zeus ====
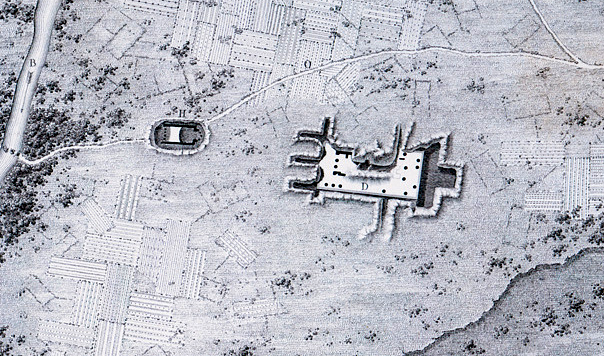
Map of the first archaeological excavations in ancient Olympia and of the temple of Olympian Zeus discovered by the Morea expedition in May 1829 (by Guillaume-Abel Blouet and Pierre Achille Poirot)

Then, the expedition spent six weeks, starting on May 10, 1829, in Olympia. Léon-Jean-Joseph Dubois (Archaeology section) and Abel Blouet (Architecture and Sculpture section) undertook the first excavations there. They were accompanied by the painters Frédéric de Gournay, Pierre Achille Poirot, Pierre Félix Trézel and Amaury-Duval, as well as a troop of more than a hundred workers. The site of Olympia had been rediscovered in 1766 by the English antiquarian Richard Chandler. Since then, it had been visited by many other travellers such as Fauvel, Pouqueville, Gell, Cokerell and Leake. Its general identification by the archaeologists of the Morea expedition was made possible thanks to the more precise descriptions of Edward Dodwell (for Dubois) and John Spencer Stanhope (for Blouet). Most of the buildings were invisible, because as Abel Blouet noted, they must have been covered with a thick layer of sediment due to the frequent overflows of rivers Alfeios and Kladeos.

Only a single large fragment of a Doric column was visible. It had already been spotted by the previous travellers because the inhabitants of neighboring villages had dug trenches there to remove the stone, but none of them had attributed it with certainty to the temple of Zeus. Abel Blouet specified: "Therefore, there could have been no merit in discovering a monument there. But what could have been a discovery was to find evidence that this monument was the famous temple of Olympian Jupiter. And this is what our excavations have enabled us to demonstrate. When we arrived at Olympia, Mr. Dubois, director of the Archaeology section of our expedition, had already been there for a few days with Mr. Trézel and Mr. Amaury Duval, his collaborators. Following the instructions which had been given to him by the commission of the Institute, this antiquarian (Dubois) had begun the excavations of which the result had been the discovery of the first bases of the two columns of the pronaos and several fragments of sculpture." The archaeological advice of Jean-Nicolas Huyot was thus followed. Dubois installed his workers on the front side of the temple and Blouet installed his own on the back side in order to give these excavations all possible extension. The painter Amaury-Duval gave in his Souvenirs (1829-1830) a personal, direct and precise, testimony of the events which led to the exact identification of the Temple of Olympian Zeus, which was thus determined for the first time.

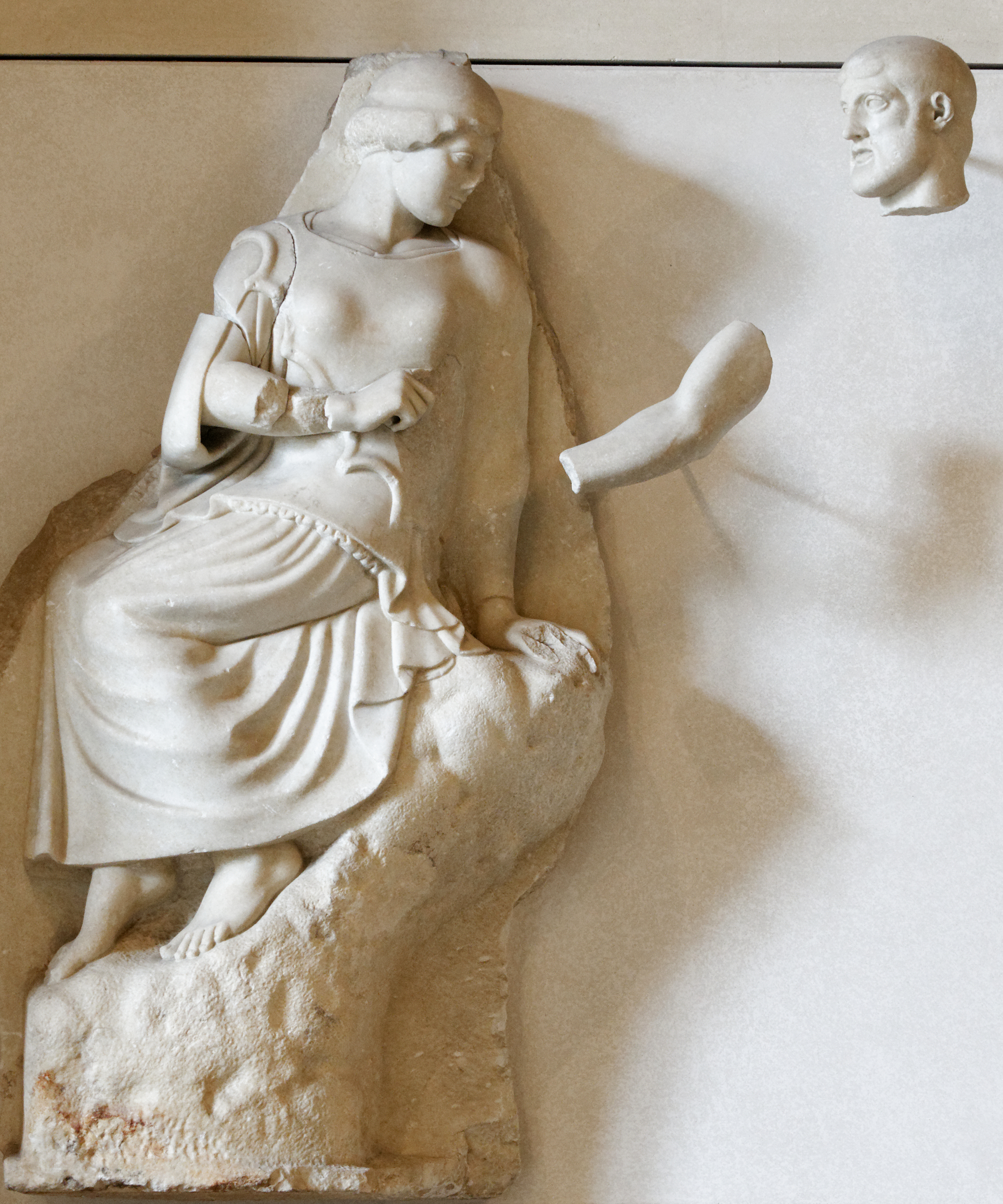
One of the metopes of Olympia transferred to the Louvre with the authorization of the Greek government by the Morea expedition

Here again, the precise descriptions of the sculptures, structural elements of the temple and metopes representing the Twelve Labours of Heracles made by Pausanias who visited the site during the second century AD, proved crucial to validate the identity of the temple of Zeus. These sculptures, which reflect the beginnings of classical art and of the severe style, strongly struck the archaeologists in Olympia and in Paris at the Academy by their novel type imbued with naturalism.

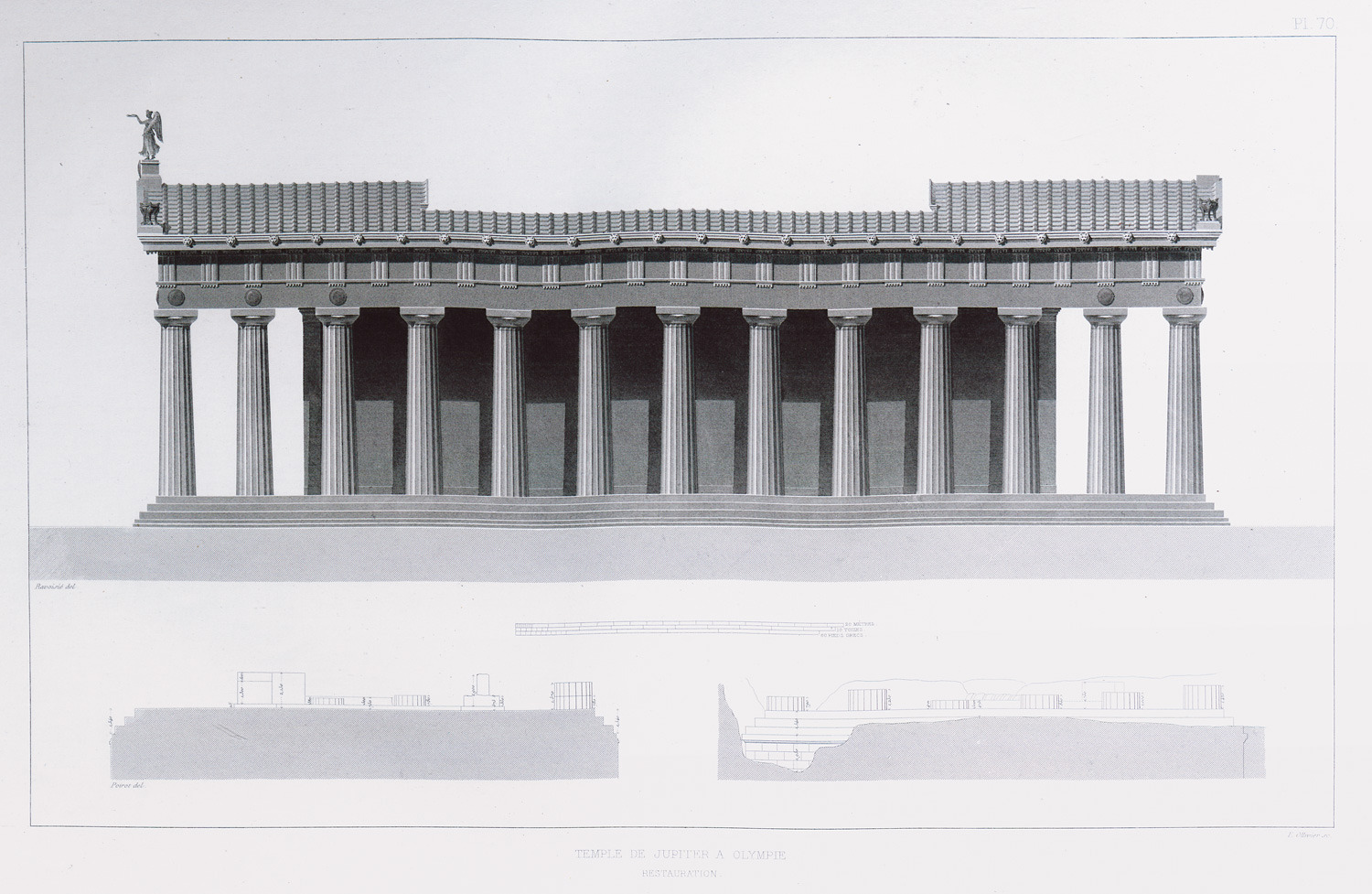
Model for restoration of the Temple of Olympian Zeus (by Abel Blouet)

As with the excavations led at Messene, the site was divided topographically into squares, trenches were dug, excavations were undertaken in straight lines, and models for restoration were proposed: archaeology was becoming rationalized. The simple treasure hunt was beginning to be abandoned. The fundamental contribution of the Morea scientific expedition was its total indifference towards looting, treasure hunting, and antiquities smuggling. Blouet refused to perform excavations that risked damaging the monuments, and banned the mutilation of statues with the intent of taking a piece separated from the rest without regard, as Elgin had done on the Parthenon some twenty-five years before. It is perhaps for this reason that the three metopes of the temple of Zeus discovered at Olympia were transferred in their entirety to the Louvre Museum (with the authorization of the Greek Government of Ioannis Kapodistrias). However, many precious works they excavated were re-buried in order to protect them, according to the direct testimony of Amaury-Duval.

==== Byzantine Greece ====
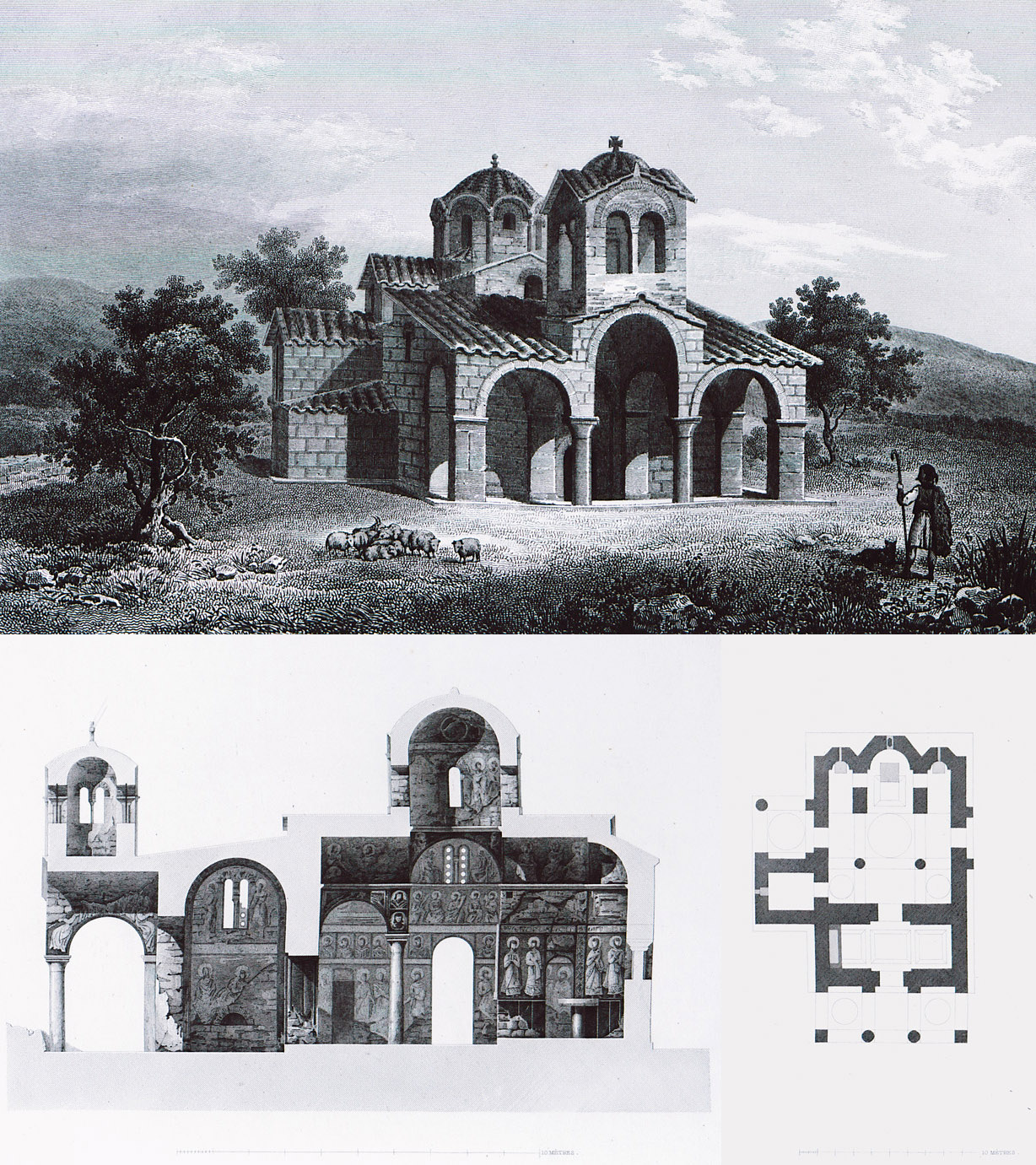
View, section and plan of the church of Samari (by Abel Blouet)

The French did not limit their interest to antiquity; they also described, reported plans and meticulously drew Byzantine monuments. Quite often, and until then for the travellers as well, only ancient Greece mattered; medieval and modern Greece were ignored. Blouet, in his Expedition scientifique de Morée; Architecture, Sculptures, Inscriptions et Vues du Péloponèse, des Cyclades et de l'Attique, gave very precise descriptions of the churches he saw, especially those of Navarino (Church of the Transfiguration of the Savior, inside the new fortress Néokastro), Osphino (destroyed village which no longer exists), Modon (Church of Saint Basil), Androusa (Church of St. George), Samari (Church of Zoodochou Pigis) or of the Vourkano monastery (or Voulkano, monastery of the Holy Mother) among others.

==== Foundation of the French School at Athens ====
The results obtained by the Morea scientific expedition underscored the need to create a permanent, stable structure that would allow its work to continue. From 1846, it was possible to systematically and permanently continue the work initiated by the Morea scientific expedition due to the creation on rue Didot, at the foot of Mount Lycabettus, of a French scientific institution, in the form of the French School at Athens.

=== End of the scientific mission ===
The vast majority of members of the scientific expedition paid a heavy price for the fevers they suffered during their sojourn in Morea. Many were forced to shorten their stay on the peninsula and to be repatriated to France before the beginning of 1830.

The topographic brigade was severely affected: out of eighteen officers who had been successively employed in the topographical works of the Morea, three had died there and ten, whose health was ruined, were forced to retire. Captain Peytier wrote in 1834: "It is geodesy that ruins my health and I do not want anymore to do it in the mountains, at any cost whatsoever." They were therefore reduced to work only during the cool season and to stop for summer, the season during which they drew their maps. Jean-Baptiste Bory de Saint-Vincent, meanwhile wrote: "The horrible heat that beset us in July placed the entire topographic brigade in disarray. These gentlemen, having worked in the sun, have nearly all taken ill, and we grieved to see M. Dechièvre die at Napoli eight days ago." Émile Puillon Boblaye wrote: "Out of twelve officers employed in the geodetic service, two are dead and all have been sick. Besides them, we have lost two sappers and a household servant."

As for the physical sciences section, its members had forgotten to install mosquito nets in their tents before exploring the mouth of the Eurotas in July 1829, and subsequently they were bitten by a species of mosquito that Gaspard Auguste Brullé was the first to describe scientifically as the Culex kounoupi Br., Pierre Théodore Virlet d'Aoust, Sextius Delaunay, Prosper Baccuet, Gaspard Auguste Brullé, three muleteers, two sappers, an interpreter and the valet Villars, were all seized with violent fevers, which sometimes worsened to the point of delirium, and which precipitated the departure of the section for Malvoisie, thus suspending their works. Bory de Saint-Vincent, one of the only members of the section to be spared from the disease, took a caïque and immediately went to Nafplio by sea, despite the storms, to seek help. The Bavarian philhellene doctor Mr. Zuccarini was then sent to Malvoisie and saved all his patients, except a sapper and the valet Villars who both died. President Ioannis Kapodistrias then placed a steamship at their disposal to repatriate them to Nafplion, then from there, to France. Bory de Saint-Vincent, Pierre Félix Trézel, Virlet d'Aoust and Peytier will then explore the Cyclades and Attica. In the Archaeology section, Léon-Jean-Joseph Dubois, Edgar Quinet and Amaury-Duval have been also affected by fever and were then prematurely repatriated to France.

Only Jean-Baptiste Vietty and Pierre Peytier continued their research in the country, until August 1831 for the first and March 1836 for the second.

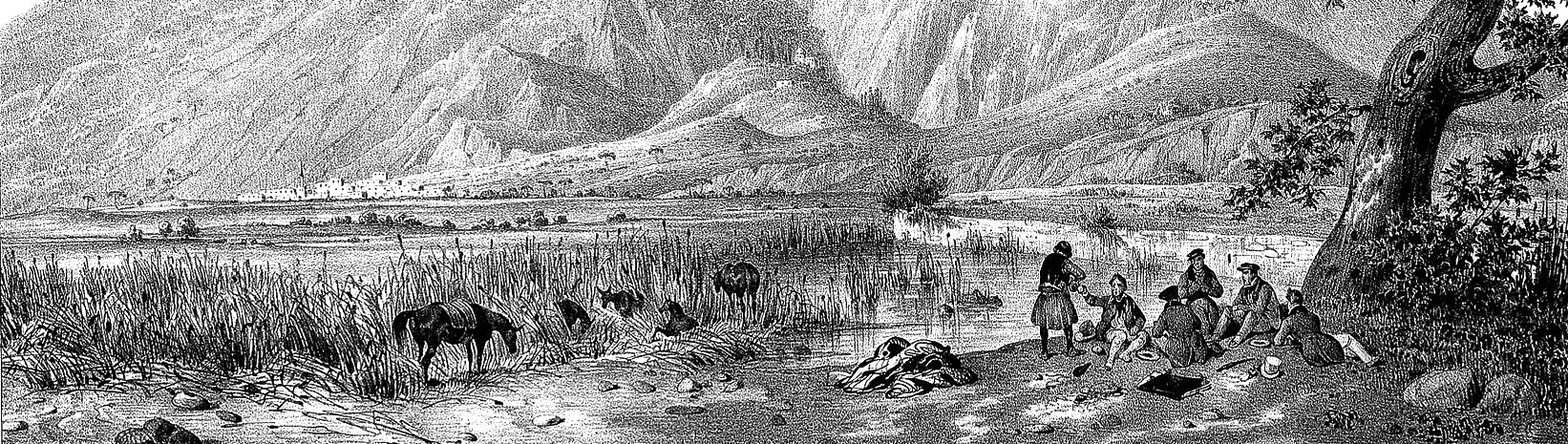
The members of the scientific commission of the Morea Expedition resting on the banks of the Pamissos, opposite Mounts Ithome and Evan, near ancient Messene (detail of a lithograph by Prosper Baccuet)

== Publications of the Morea expedition ==
Back in France, soldiers and scientists of the Morea expedition recounted their personal experiences or presented their scientific results in numerous works which were published throughout the 19th century.

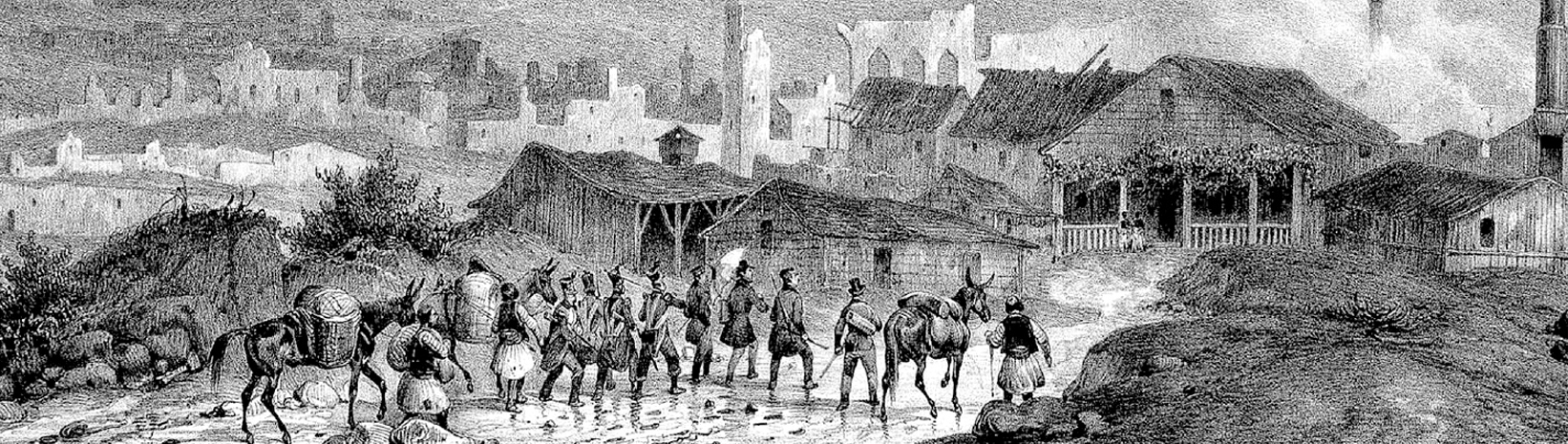
The members of the scientific commission of the Morea Expedition accompanied by French soldiers entering Tripolizza, devastated during the Greek War of Independence (detail of a lithograph by Prosper Baccuet)

=== Military expedition ===
- Charles-Joseph Bastide, Considérations sur les maladies qui ont régné en Morée, pendant la campagne de 1828 (Internet Archive). Thesis presented publicly and defended at the Faculty of Medicine of Montpellier on 19 March 1830 by Charles-Joseph Bastide, Surgeon-Major of the 16th Line Infantry Regiment, to obtain the grade of Doctor of Medicine, imprimeur Jean Martel Aîné, Montpellier, 1830.
- J.F. Bessan, Souvenirs de l'expédition de Morée en 1828, suivis d'un mémoire historique sur Athènes, avec le plan de cette ville (Google books), Impr. Henri Gomont, Valognes, 1835.
- Denis Bousquet, Mon voyage en Grèce ou relation de notre campagne sur la fin de l'année 1828, impr. de Marius Olive, Marseille, 1829.
- Eugène Cavaignac, Lettres d'Eugène Cavaignac, Expédition de Morée (1828–1829) (Gallica–BnF), Revue des deux Mondes, 141, 1er Mai 1897.
- Lucien Davesiès de Pontès, Études sur l'Orient, par Lucien Davesiès de Pontès, précédées d'une notice biographique par le bibliophile Jacob (Gallica–BnF), and Notes sur la Grèce : Journal d'un lieutenant de Frégate de 1828–33, posthumous works, Michel Lévy Frères, Paris, 1864.
- Alexandre Duheaume, Souvenirs de la Morée, pour servir à l'histoire de l'expédition française en 1828–1829. (Gallica–BnF), Anselin, Paris, 1833.
- Jacques Louis Lacour, Excursions en Grèce pendant l'occupation de la Morée par l'armée française en 1832–33 (Google books), Arthur Bertrand, Paris, 1834
- Nicolas-Joseph Maison, Dépêches adressées au ministre de la Guerre Louis-Victor de Caux, vicomte de Blacquetot, October 1828, in Jacques Mangeart, Additional Chapter in the Souvenirs de la Morée: recueillis pendant le séjour des Français dans le Péloponèse, Igonette, Paris, 1830.
- Jacques Mangeart, Souvenirs de la Morée: recueillis pendant le séjour des Français dans le Peloponèse, Igonette, Paris, 1830.
- Gaspard Roux, Histoire médicale de l'armée française en Morée, pendant la campagne de 1828 (Google books), Méquignon l'aîné père, Paris, 1829.
- Soult de Dalmatie, La Grèce après la campagne de Morée, Revue Des Deux Mondes (1829–1971), 1/2, first series, 7-87, 1831.
- Franco-Greek newspaper, Le Courrier d'Orient, Patras, 1829.

=== Scientific expedition ===
==== Physical Sciences section ====
The scientists of the Natural Sciences section have published their results in six books, grouped into three volumes (bound in five parts) and an Atlas (sixth part) entitled "The scientific expedition of Morea. Section of Physical Sciences”, Ministry of National Education, France. Morée Scientific Commission, F.G. Levrault, Paris, 1832–1836:

- Volume I: Relation (1836) Bory de Saint-Vincent.
- Volume II: First Part: Géographie et géologie (1834) Bory de Saint-Vincent.
- Volume II: Second Part: Géologie et minéralogie (1833) Puillon de Boblaye et Théodore Virlet.
- Volume III: First Part: Zoologie (1832): Première section (Vertébrés, Mollusques et Polypiers) Geoffroy Saint-Hilaire père et fils, Bibron, Deshayes et Bory de Saint-Vincent. Deuxième section (Animaux articulés) Brullé et Guérin.
- Volume III: Second Part: Botanique (1832) Fauché, Adolphe Brongniart, Chaubard, Bory de Saint-Vincent.
- Atlas (1835): Relation (Cartes & Vues de Paysages), Géologie (Coupes & Roches), Zoologie (Vertébrés & Invertébrés), Botanique.

Other works complemented this opus:

- Nouvelle Flore du Péloponnèse et des Cyclades Bory de Saint-Vincent, Reviewed edition, augmented by the Flore de Morée. de 1832, F.G. Levrault, Paris, 1838
- Recherches géographiques sur les ruines de Morée Émile Puillon Boblaye, F.G. Levrault, Paris, 1836.
- Notice sur les opérations géodésiques exécutées en Morée, en 1829 et 1830, MM. Peytier, Puillon-Boblaye et Servier; suivie d’un catalogue des positions géographiques des principaux points déterminés par ces opérations, Pierre Peytier, Émile Puillon Boblaye et Aristide-Camille Servier, in the Bulletin de la Société de géographie, vol. 19 n° 117–122 (Jan–June 1833)
- The Peytier Album, Liberated Greece and the Morea Scientific Expedition, in the Stephen Vagliano Collection, Album by Pierre Peytier, National Bank of Greece, Athens, 1971.
- Percement de l'isthme de Corinthe Pierre Théodore Virlet d'Aoust, p. 408–421, Bulletin de la Société de géographie, vol. 2, 1881.

==== Archaeology section ====
- De la Grèce moderne, et de ses rapports avec l'antiquité by Edgar Quinet, F.G. Levrault, Paris, 1830.
- Souvenirs (1829-1830) Eugène Emmanuel Amaury Duval, Librairie Plon, E. Plon, Nourrit et Cie, imprimeurs-éditeurs, Paris, 1885.
- Journal de voyage de M. Trézel (unpublished), by Pierre Félix Trézel, National Library of France–BnF, n. acq. fr. 1849, fol. 19r, 21 July 1829.
- Jean-Baptiste Vietty et l'Expédition de Morée (1829). À propos de deux manuscrits retrouvés by Stéphane Gioanni, Journal des Savants, De Boccard, 2008, 2 (1), pp. 383–429. doi:10.3406/jds.2008.5891
- Mémoire sur l'état présent de la Morée, by Michel Schinas, Archives of the Académie des Sciences of the Institut de France, File: Commission de Morée (1830). Annotated by A. Panayiotopoulou-Gavatha. Παναγιωτοπούλου–Γαβαθά, Α. (2016). Ένα υπόμνημα του Μ. Σχινά για την κατάσταση της Πελοποννήσου στα 1830. Σχολιασμένη έκδοση. The Gleaner, 11, 333–362. doi:10.12681/er.9408

==== Architecture and Sculpture section ====
- Volume I: Expedition scientifique de Morée ordonnée par le Gouvernement Français; Architecture, Sculptures, Inscriptions et Vues du Péloponèse, des Cyclades et de l'Attique (1831) Abel Blouet, Amable Ravoisié, Achille Poirot, Félix Trézel et Frédéric de Gournay, Firmin Didot, Paris.
- Volume II: Expedition scientifique de Morée ordonnée par le Gouvernement Français; Architecture, Sculptures, Inscriptions et Vues du Péloponèse, des Cyclades et de l'Attique (1833) Abel Blouet, Amable Ravoisié, Achille Poirot, Félix Trézel et Frédéric de Gournay, Firmin Didot, Paris.
- Volume III: Expedition scientifique de Morée ordonnée par le Gouvernement Français; Architecture, Sculptures, Inscriptions et Vues du Péloponèse, des Cyclades et de l'Attique (1838) Abel Blouet, Amable Ravoisié, Achille Poirot, Félix Trézel et Frédéric de Gournay, Firmin Didot, Paris.

== Bibliography ==
- Baloti Xeni D., Le maréchal N.J. Maison (1771–1840) – Un Grand Philhellène, editions Helliniki Euroekdotiki, Athens, 1993.
- Bourguet Marie-Noëlle, Lepetit Bernard, Nordman Daniel, Sinarellis Maroula, L’Invention scientifique de la Méditerranée. Égypte, Morée, Algérie., Editions EHESS, 1998. ISBN 2-7132-1237-5 (in French)
- Brewer David, The Greek War of Independence : The Struggle for Freedom from Ottoman Oppression and the Birth of the Modern Greek Nation, New York, The Overlook Press, 393 p. 2001. ISBN 978-1-58567-395-7
- Brunet de Presle Wladimir and Alexandre Blanchet, Grèce depuis la conquête romaine jusqu’à nos jours, Paris, Firmin Didot, 589 p., 1860. (in French)
- Contogeorgis Georges, Histoire de la Grèce, Paris, Hatier, coll. Nations d'Europe, 477 p., 1992. ISBN 978-2-218-03841-9 (in French)
- Dakin Douglas, The Greek Struggle for Independence, 1821–1833, University of California Press, 1973.
- Driault Édouard and Lhéritier Michel, Histoire diplomatique de la Grèce, de 1821 à nos jours, volume I and II, Les presses universitaires de France, Paris, 1925. (in French)
- Gioanni Stéphane, Jean-Baptiste Vietty et l'Expédition de Morée (1829). À propos de deux manuscrits retrouvés, Journal des Savants, De Boccard, 2 (1), pp. 383–429, 2008. doi:10.3406/jds.2008.5891 (in French)
- Hugo Abel, France militaire. Histoire des armées françaises de terre et de mer de 1792 à 1837. Delloye, 1838. (in French)
- Kalogerakou Pigi P. (Καλογεράκου Πηγή Π.), The contribution of the French expeditionary corpse to the restoration of the fortresses and the cities of Messinia (Η συμβολή του Γαλλικού εκστρατευτικού σώματος στην αποκατάσταση των φρουρίων και των πόλεων της Μεσσηνίας), in Οι πολιτικοστρατιωτικές σχέσεις Ελλάδας–Γαλλίας (19ος–20ός αι.), Direction of the Army's History (Διεύθυνση Ιστορίας Στρατού), 13–41, Athens, 2011. (in Greek)
- Kapodistrias Ioannis, Correspondance du comte J. Capodistrias, président de la Grèce, A. Cherbuliez et Cie., Paris, Geneva, 1839. (in French)
- Livieratos Evangelos, Mapping Greece in 19th Century, Aristotle University of Thessaloniki, website (in English).
- Livieratos Evangelos, Cartographic adventures of Greece 1821–1919, Athens: MIET/ELIA; p. 287, 2009. ISBN 978-960-201-194-2 (in Greek)
- Kastanis Andreas, The teaching of mathematics in the Greek military academy during the first years of its foundation (1828–1834), Historia Mathematica, vol. 30, no 2, p. 123–139, May 2003. doi:10.1016/s0315-0860(02)00023-x
- Polychronopoulou Olga, Archéologues sur les pas d’Homère. La naissance de la protohistoire égéenne, Noêsis, Paris, 1999. ISBN 2-911606-41-8 (in French)
- Yiannis Saïtas et coll., L'œuvre de l'expédition scientifique de Morée 1829–1838, Edited by Yiannis Saïtas, Editions Melissa, 2011 (1re Partie)–2017 (2nde Partie). (in French)
- Γιάννης Σαΐτας et al., Το έργο της γαλλικής επιστημονικής αποστολής του Μοριά 1829–1838, Επιμέλεια Γιάννης Σαΐτας, Εκδόσεις Μέλισσα, 2011 (Μέρος Α΄)–2017 (Μέρος Β΄). (in Greek)
- Sivignon Michel, Université Paris X–Nanterre, Les enseignements de la carte de Grèce à l’échelle de 1/200.000 (publiée en 1852) (Pergamos–Digital Library of the University of Athens (UoA)). Communication presented in the seminar of Gythion-Areopolis Lakonias Voyageurs et expéditions scientifiques: témoignages sur l'espace et la société de Mani, 4–7 nov 1993 and published in Mani. Témoignages sur l’espace et la société. Voyageurs et expéditions scientifiques (15°–19° siècle), Athens, Institut d’Études Néo-helléniques, pp. 435–445, 1996. (in French)
- Schmitz Jean, Territorialisation du savoir et invention de la Méditerranée, in Cahiers d’études africaines, n°165, 2002. (in French)
- Simopoulos Kyriakos, Ξενοκρατία, μισελληνισμός και υποτέλεια, εκδ. Στάχυ, pp. 450–455, Athens, 1997. (in Greek)
- Simopoulos Kyriakos, Ξένοι Ταξιδιώτες στην Ελλάδα, vol. 1–4, χ.ε. 1970–76, editions Στάχυ, Athens, 2001. (in Greek)
- Simopoulos Kyriakos, Πως είδαν οι Ξένοι την Ελλάδα του '21 (1821–1829), vol. 1–5, χ.ε. 1979–82, editions Πιρόγα, Athens, 2007. (in Greek)
- Themeli-Katifori Despina (Θεμελή-Κατηφόρη Δέσποινα), Το Γαλλικό Ενδιαφέρον για την Ελλάδα στην Περίοδο του Καποδίστρια 1828–1831, Αθήνα, εκδ. Επικαιρότητα, 1985, (French interest in Greece during the Capodistrian period 1828–1831, Athens, ed. Epikairotita, 1985). (in Greek)
- Tsagkaraki Anastasia, Les philhellènes français dans la lutte pour l’indépendance grecque (1821–1831), Revue Historique des Armées, 2nd trimester 2016. (in French)
- Tisrigos Antonis K. (Τσιρίγος Αντώνης Κ.), The Capodistrian School of Methoni (Το καποδιστριακό Σχολείο της Μεθώνης, 1829–2016), preface by Pr. Petros Themelis, Private Edition, Athens, 2017. (in Greek)
- Tzanakos Nikos (Τζανάκος Νίκος), Η γαλλική εκστρατεία στον Μοριά και ο στρατάρχης Μαιζών (The French expedition to Morea and Marshal Maison), Editions Pikramenos (Εκδόσεις Πικραμένος), Patras, 2017. ISBN 978-960-662-892-4 (in Greek)
- Vaulabelle Archibald de, Histoire des deux Restaurations, jusqu’à l'avènement de Louis-Philippe, de janvier 1813 à octobre 1830., Perrotin, 1860. (in French)
- Witmore, C.L., “The Expedition scientifique de Moree and a map of the Peloponnesus.” Dissertation on the Metamedia site at Stanford University. 2005
- Woodhouse Christopher Montague, The Battle of Navarino, Hoddler and Stoughton, 191 p., London, 1965. ISBN 0340002840
- Woodhouse Christopher Montague, The Philhellenes, London, Hodder et Stoughton, 192 p., London, 1969. ISBN 034010824X
- Zambon Alessia (pref. Alain Schnapp), Aux Origines de l’archéologie en Grèce : Fauvel et sa méthode, 351 p., Paris cths et INHA, 2014. ISBN 978-2-7355-0822-8 (in French)
- Collective, An Index of events in the military history of the greek nation, Athens, Hellenic Army General Staff, Army History Directorate, 1st ed., 471 p., 1998. ISBN 978-960-7897-27-5
- Le Courrier d'Orient, French-language newspaper published by Maxime Raybaud in Patras between 1828 and 1829 during the French expedition in Peloponnese. (in French)
