= Claude-Henri Watelet =

French writer and painter (1718–1786)

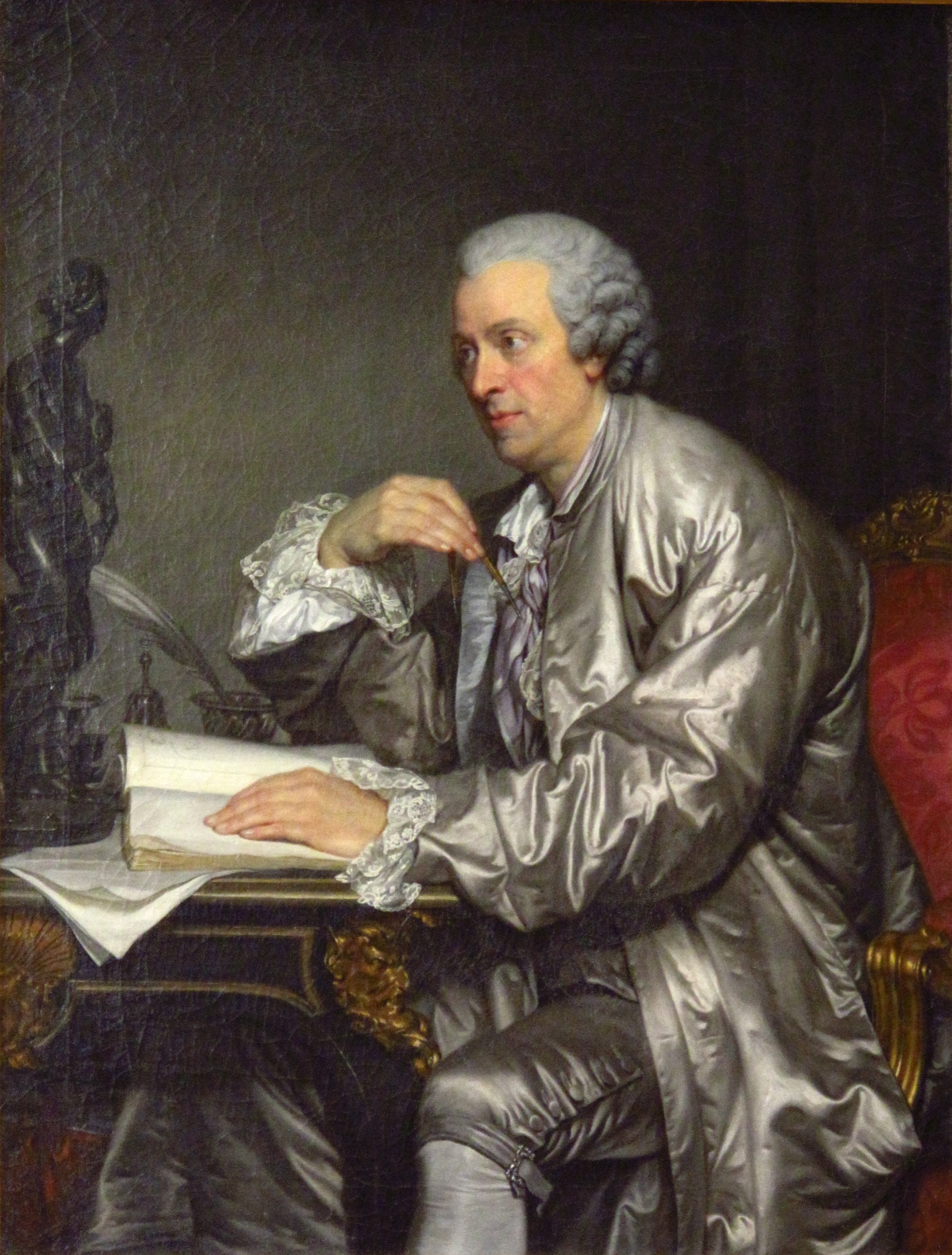
Portrait of Watelet by Jean-Baptiste Greuze, c. 1763–65

Claude-Henri Watelet (28 August 1718 – 12 January 1786) was a rich French fermier-général who was an amateur painter, a well-respected etcher, a writer on the arts and a connoisseur of gardens. Watelet's inherited privilege of farming taxes in the Orléanais left him free to pursue his avocations, art and literature and gardens. His Essai sur les jardins, 1774, firmly founded on English ideas expressed by Thomas Whately, introduced the English landscape garden to France, as the jardin Anglois. The sociable Watelet, who was born and died in Paris, was at the center of the French art world of his time.

== Biography ==
Watelet was born in Paris, where he kept house in the rue Charlot and attended the Monday salons of Mme Geoffrin, where he would have seen La Live de Jully, who engraved one of Watelet's drawings and who, like Watelet, was an early patron of Greuze. Watelet was received as an honorary associate of the Académie royale de peinture et de sculpture in 1754, at the same time as Bergeret de Grandcourt, another collector and connoisseur whose avocations were supported by the Ferme Générale.

In 1760 he was elected to the Académie française on the strength of his didactic poem L'Art de peindre. The poem is composed in four chants devoted in turn to Design, Colour, Picturesque Invention and Poetic Invention. It is followed by precepts in prose on Proportions, Ensemble, Balance or Weight and Movement of the figures, Beauty, Grace, Harmony of Light and Colours, Effects, and the Expression of the Passions. The second half of the work was decorated with his illustrative engravings and vignettes, for was a talented etcher: Denis Diderot said that if he had a copy of Watelet's poem L'Art de peindre he would cut out the illustrations and frame them under glass, and throw the rest in the fire.

An expanded version of the essays furnished the basis of Watelet's unfinished dictionary of the fine arts.

About this time Watelet embarked on a lifelong affair with the pastellist Marguerite Lecomte, a young married woman whom he had been teaching the technique of etching. With her and his old tutor the abbé Copette of the Sorbonne he made a second Italian tour, 1763–64. In Rome, two pensionnaires of the Académie française in Rome assembled a complimentary collection of poems by Luigi Subleyras, titled Nella venuta in Roma di madama le Comte e dei signori Watelet e Copette, which commemorates their visit in 1764; it is illustrated with etchings, mostly by Étienne de La Vallée Poussin, and Franz Edmund Weirotter and Hubert Robert, whose own suite of ten etchings Les Soirées de Rome, produced at the same time, was dedicated to Mme Le Conte. Winckelmann took them to view the antiquities at the Villa Albani

In the Essai sur les Jardins, Watelet's experience of the Physiocrats informed his bucolic vision of a France that might be able to return to a simple agrarian economy based upon idealized models of the family-owned farm. He declared his devotion to the philosophy of Rousseau in the opening pages of his garden treatise, which gave a detailed account of the laying out of a ferme ornée, such as the English poet William Shenstone had pioneered at The Leasowes, begun in 1743.

Watelet had preceded his essay with his own experiments in gardening on an island in the River Seine that he owned, at Colombes (Hauts-de-Seine); there between 1754 and 1772 he created a "picturesque setting unique in French gardens at the time it was created," according to William Howard Adams. His Moulin Joly ("Pretty Mill") offered a residence, a farm, stables, a dairy, an apiary, a mill, walks, rides and vistas ornamented with sculpture, a flower garden and a physic garden, with a medical laboratory and an infirmary, uniting the beautiful with the useful. The inspiration for the new sensibility for an atmospheric garden – which a plan of the Moulin Joly shows to have had perfectly straight rides through the woods, is generally credited to the vision of painters in the generation of Watteau, who painted in the now-overgrown gardens laid out in the previous century. Watelin's inspiration may have come in part through his friend Boucher. In the 1740s Jean-Baptiste Oudry had access to the overgrown gardens of the prince de Guise at Arcueil and often brought younger artists to sketch with him in the neglected grounds; Boucher accompanied him on several occasions.

Though his friendship with the painter François Boucher, and his art lessons in Italy with Hubert Robert during his youthful tour, the influences of Boucher and "Robert-les-ruines" were directly transferred to the new French gardens in the genre pittoresque. In 1780 the visionary neoclassical architect Nicolas Le Camus de Mézières dedicated to Watelet Le génie de l'architecture, ou L'analogie de cet art avec nos sensations ("The Genius of Architecture, or the Analogy of That Art with Our Sensations").

Watelet's treatise appeared in the same year that Marie Antoinette's gardens round the Petit Trianon began to be remodelled; by 1783 two sides of the pavilion looked onto small glades of lawn encircled by sweeps and clumps of trees, and her petit hameau was finished, like a stage set for a pastorale, reflecting itself at the far end of a little lake no larger than a village pond.

In Greuze's portrait (illustrated above), Watelet is shown with calipers in hand and a bronze reduction of the Venus de' Medici on his bureau plat, as if in the process of determining the secret of perfect proportions of the female body. Watelet wrote articles for the Encyclopédie; noted by John R. Pannabecker, on painting and engraving, contributed to a volume of lives of the successive holders of the post of premier peintre du roi since Charles Le Brun (1752) and worked on a projected Dictionaire des beaux-arts; increasing feebleness and exhaustion overcame his efforts, and the work was completed and published after his death.

To indulge his interest in the stage he wrote a number of comedies and short pastoral dramas, listed below. Two of them appear to have been performed, one to a select company at Choisy.

== Publications ==
=== In the arts ===
- Encyclopédie, "Gravure", vol. 7 (1757)
- Contributions to Vies des premiers peintres du roi, depuis M. Le Brun jusqu'à présent (1752).
- L'Art de peindre, poème, avec des réflexions sur les différentes parties de la peinture (1760). (on-line text)
- Essai sur les jardins (1774). RRprinted (Gérard Monfort), 2004. (on-line text)
- Dictionnaire des beaux-arts (2 volumes, 1788–91). Watelet's work was completed by Pierre-Charles Lévesque and others (On-line text at and . The dictionary was re-edited in 5 volumes as Dictionnaire de arts de peinture, sculpture et gravure in 1792. Facsimile edition: L. F. Prault, Paris /Minkoff, Genève, 1972.
- Rymbranesques ou Essais de gravures (1783). Album of engravings by Rembrandt and by Watelet. From 1767 Rembrandt's copper etching plates were preserved in Watelet's collection. This album stands at the head of a tradition of modern restrikes of the Rembrandt etchings:

=== Theatre ===
- La Maison de campagne à la mode, ou La comédie d'après nature, comédie en deux actes, en prose, composée en 1777 (1784). "The fashionable country house, or a comedy from the life" (on-line text)
- Recueil de quelques ouvrages de M. Watelet, de l'Académie françoise et de celle de peinture (1784).
  - Silvie
  - Zénéïde, en 1 acte, en prose, composée en janvier 1743
  - Les Statuaires d'Athènes, comédie en 3 actes en prose, composée en 1766 **Les Veuves, ou la Matrône d'Éphèse, comédie en 3 actes, en vers
  - Milon, intermède pastoral en 1 acte en vers
  - Deucalion et Pyrrha, opéra à grand spectacle, en 4 actes en vers, composé en 1765, exécuté au concert des écoles gratuites de dessin, le 29 avril 1772, dans la salle du Wauxhall de la foire St-Germain. (On-line text)].
  - Délie, drame lyrique en 1 acte en vers, composé en 1765
  - Phaon, drame lyrique en 2 actes en vers mêlé d'ariettes, représenté devant Leurs Majestés à Choisy en septembre 1778.
