= Kresilas =

Greek sculptor (c. 480 – 410 BC)

- Born: c. 480 BC; Kydonia, Crete, Classical Greece
- Died: c. 410 BC
- Education: In Argos, Dorotheos's school; In Athens, Myron's school
- Known for: sculpture
- Notable work: Pericles with the Corinthian helmet; Athena of Velletri

Kresilas (Greek: Κρησίλας Krēsílas; c. 480 – c. 410 BC) was a Greek sculptor in the Classical period (5th century BC), from Kydonia. He was trained in Argos and then worked in Athens at the time of the Peloponnesian War, as a follower of the idealistic portraiture of Myron. He is best known for his statue Pericles with the Corinthian helmet.

== Biography ==
Kresilas hailed from the city-state of Kydonia, on the island of Crete. He was trained in Argos as a student of Dorotheos, with whom he worked at Delphi and Hermione. Between 450 and 420 BC he worked mainly in Athens, as a follower of Myron's school and in the post-Phidias period he brought elements of compactness due to the Peloponnesian period.

Roman writer Pliny the Elder wrote of a competition between the four sculptors Polykleitos, Phidias, Kresilas, and Phradmon, on the best statues of Amazons for the Temple of Artemis at Ephesus. Each sculptor placed himself at first place, but Phidias, Kresilas, and Phradmon had all put Polykleitos at second place, thus, Polykleitos won, Pheidias came second, and Kresilas third.

== Work ==
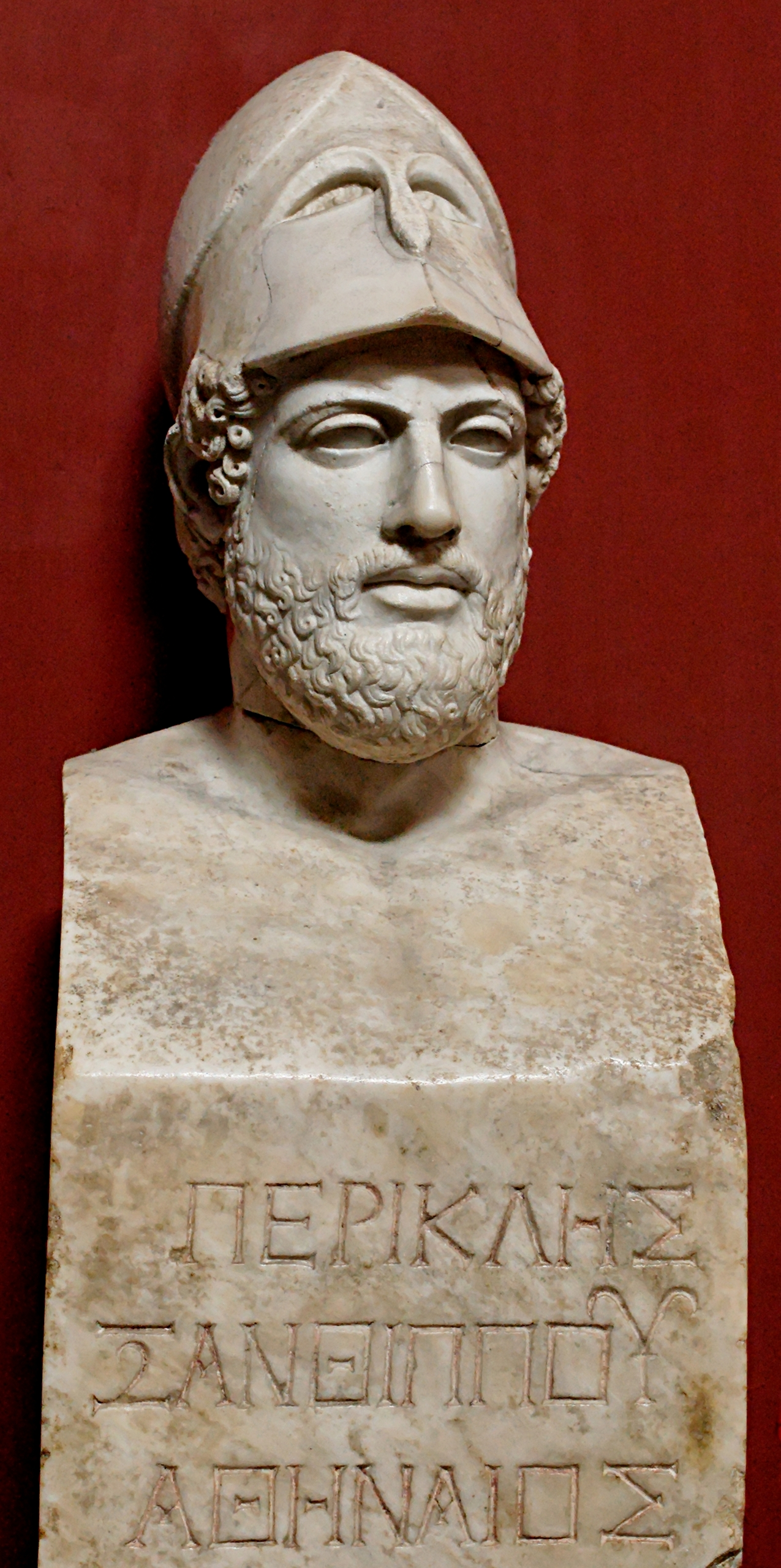
Herm of “Pericles, son of Xanthippus, Athenian”, Roman copy of the original by Kresilas, Vatican Museums (no. 269).

In Athens he created, for example, a bronze statue of Pericles (440–430 BC) with the Corinthian helmet upon the head as a sign of his position as strategos. Pliny the Elder said of it: "a work worthy of the title; it is a marvellous thing about this art that it can make famous men even more famous". Its base was found in the Athenian Acropolis; it was doubtless the bronze that Pausanias saw there (Pausanias I.25.1, I.28.2). It seems the series of Pericles portrait busts derive from it, of which there are examples at the Vatican Museums, British Museum (found at Hadrian's Villa at Tivoli, and owned by Charles Townley) and Altes Museum.

Kresilas also created the wounded men and a dying Amazon for Ephesus in concurrence (in a competition with Phidias and Polykleitos), possibly the model for many copies, one of which is the wounded Amazon of Kresilas (volnerata; Pliny, Nat. Hist. xxxiv. 75) in the Vatican Museums. He has also been identified as the originator of the Velletri type of Athena statue (Athena of Velletri). He created a Diomedes statue according to Homer's description.

=== "Cresilla" ===
In 1804 CE, Kresilas was mistakenly identified as a woman named "Cresilla" by Matilda Betham, who thought "she" had placed third behind Polykleitos and Phidias in a competition to sculpt seven Amazons for the Temple of Artemis at Ephesus. As a result, Kresilas was mistakenly included in artist Judy Chicago's symbolic history of women in Western civilization, The Dinner Party.

== Sources ==
- Furtwängler, Adolf, Masterpieces of Greek Sculpture: A Series of Essays on the History of Art, Volume 2, Charles Scribner's Sons, 1895.
- Hurwit, Jeffrey M., Artists and Signatures in Ancient Greece, Cambridge University Press, 2015. ISBN 9781316352519.
- Metropolitan Museum of Art (New York, N.Y.), Philippe De Montebello, The Metropolitan Museum of Art Guide, Metropolitan Museum of Art, 1994. ISBN 9780870997105.
- Pliny. Natural History, Volume IX: Books 33–35. Translated by H. Rackham. Loeb Classical Library 394. Cambridge, MA: Harvard University Press, 1952.
- Politt, J. J., The Art of Ancient Greece: Sources and Documents, Cambridge University Press, 1990. ISBN 9780521273664.
- Der Neue Pauly Vol. 6 (in German). Metzler. 1999. ISBN 3-476-01476-2.
- Pietro Orlandini (1961). "Kresilas". Enciclopedia dell'arte antica classica e orientale (in Italian). Vol. 4. Roma: Istituto della enciclopedia italiana.
- Le Muse (in Italian). Vol. 3. Novara: De Agostini. 1965.
- Antonio (1987). Arte greca : Dall'età classica all'età ellenistica (in Italian). Milano: Il saggiatore.
