= Nicolas Frémery =

French sculptor

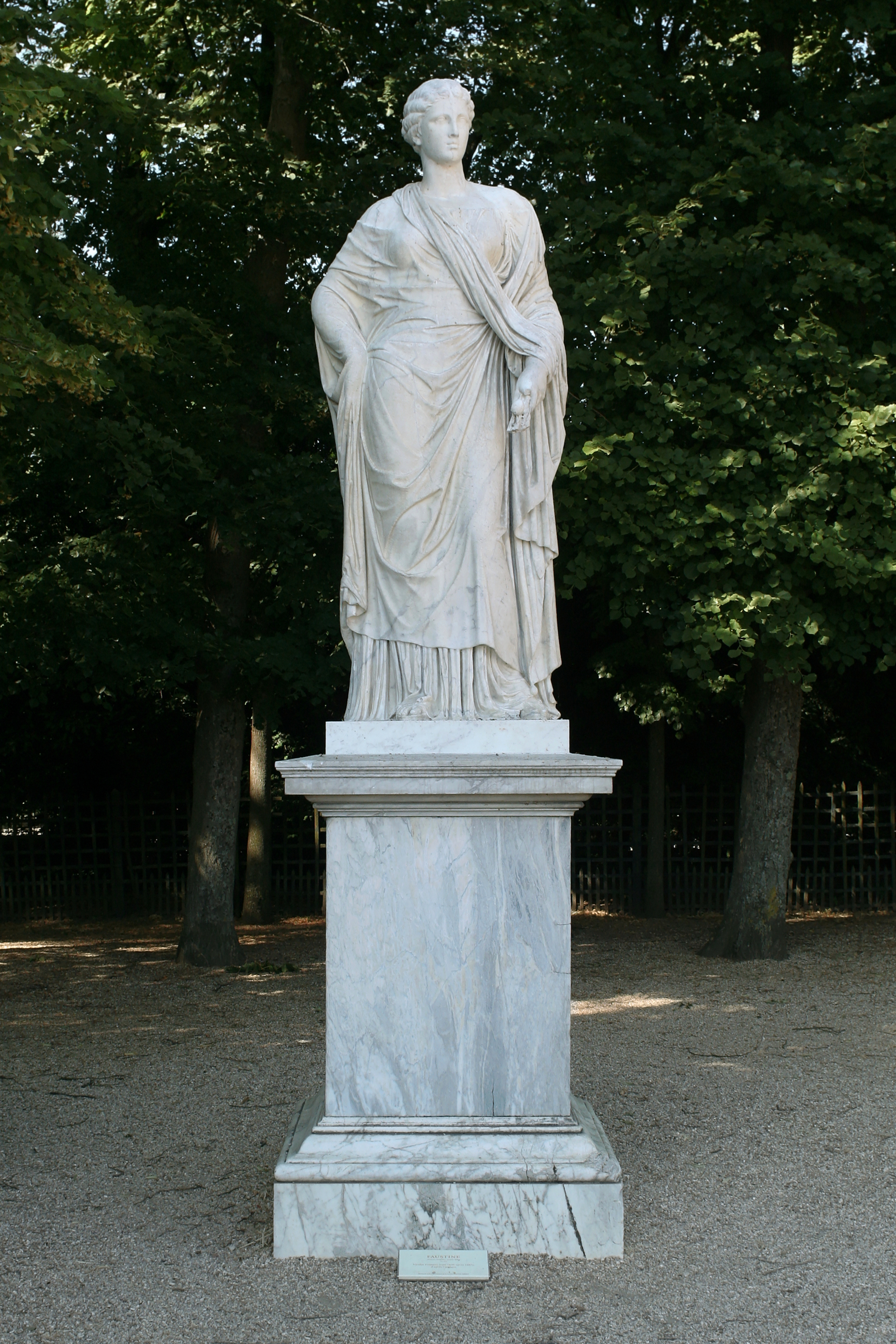
Faustina by Nicolas Frémery, Palace of Versailles, 1684

Nicolas Frémery (? - after 1687) was a French 17th-century sculptor, best known for his marble copies of the Medici Venus, the Apollino and other works by classical and Hellenistic sculptors. He also produced a Faustina and a Urania for the gardens of the Palace of Versailles.
