= Pietro Bazzanti e Figlio Art Gallery =

Art gallery in Florence, Italy

- Established: 1822; 204 years ago
- Location: Various
- Coordinates: 43.771°N 11.248°E
- Type: Art gallery
- Founder: Pietro Bazzanti
- Website: www.galleriabazzanti.it/en/

The Pietro Bazzanti e Figlio Art Gallery (Italian: Galleria d'Arte Pietro Bazzanti e Figlio) is a historic art gallery located in Florence, Italy. The gallery specialises in reproductions of Classical, Neo-classical and Renaissance art, while also producing original works by contemporary artists. It has long catered to foreign customers seeking replicas of masterpieces admired during their travels.

== History ==
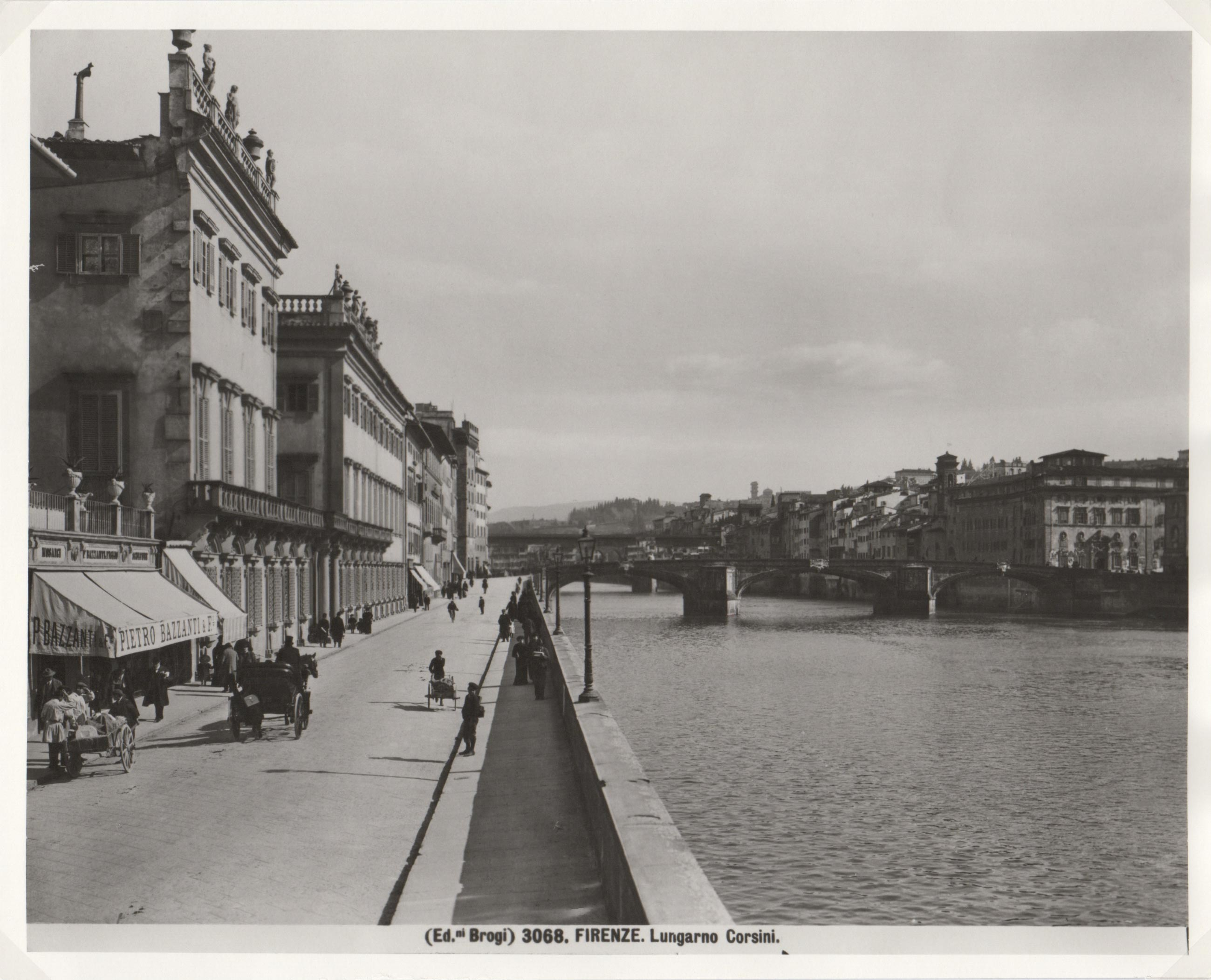
View of the Lungarno Corsini in Florence with the Art Gallery Pietro Bazzanti e Figlio, Florence 1890

Situated along the Lungarno Corsini by the Arno river, the gallery became a popular destination for art enthusiasts. The gallery's origins trace back to 1815, to a studio originally opened by Luigi Bozzolini, the last descendant of a family of sculptors and decorators who worked for the Corsini family since the 17th century. In 1822, Pietro Bazzanti took over the studio and expanded it as a showroom for his work. The first mention of the gallery appears in 19th century city guidebooks, which describe its location in the current Palazzo Corsini, as a "space with a large window on the Lungarno with a sculpture atelier in the rear with access from Via del Parione".

=== Pietro Bazzanti and the early years ===
Pietro Bazzanti (born 1775) lived in Via della Carraia, the current stretch of Borgo San Frediano from Via dei Serragli to Piazza San Frediano. He later moved into an apartment above his studio in Via del Parione at number 13.

He continued the work of his predecessor, Luigi Bozzolini, producing high-quality replicas of classical and ancient sculptures. The 1841 Florentine population census declares "...makes sculpture statues".

=== Niccolò Bazzanti and his contributions ===
Pietro's son, Niccolò Bazzanti (1802-1869), was also a prominent sculptor. In 1822, Niccolò won an award for two sketches at the Academy of Fine Arts, where he graduated in 1824. He continued to work with his father while establishing his own artistic career. In 1840 he was nominated by the academy "Academician Professor of Sculpture in the First Class of the Arts and Design".

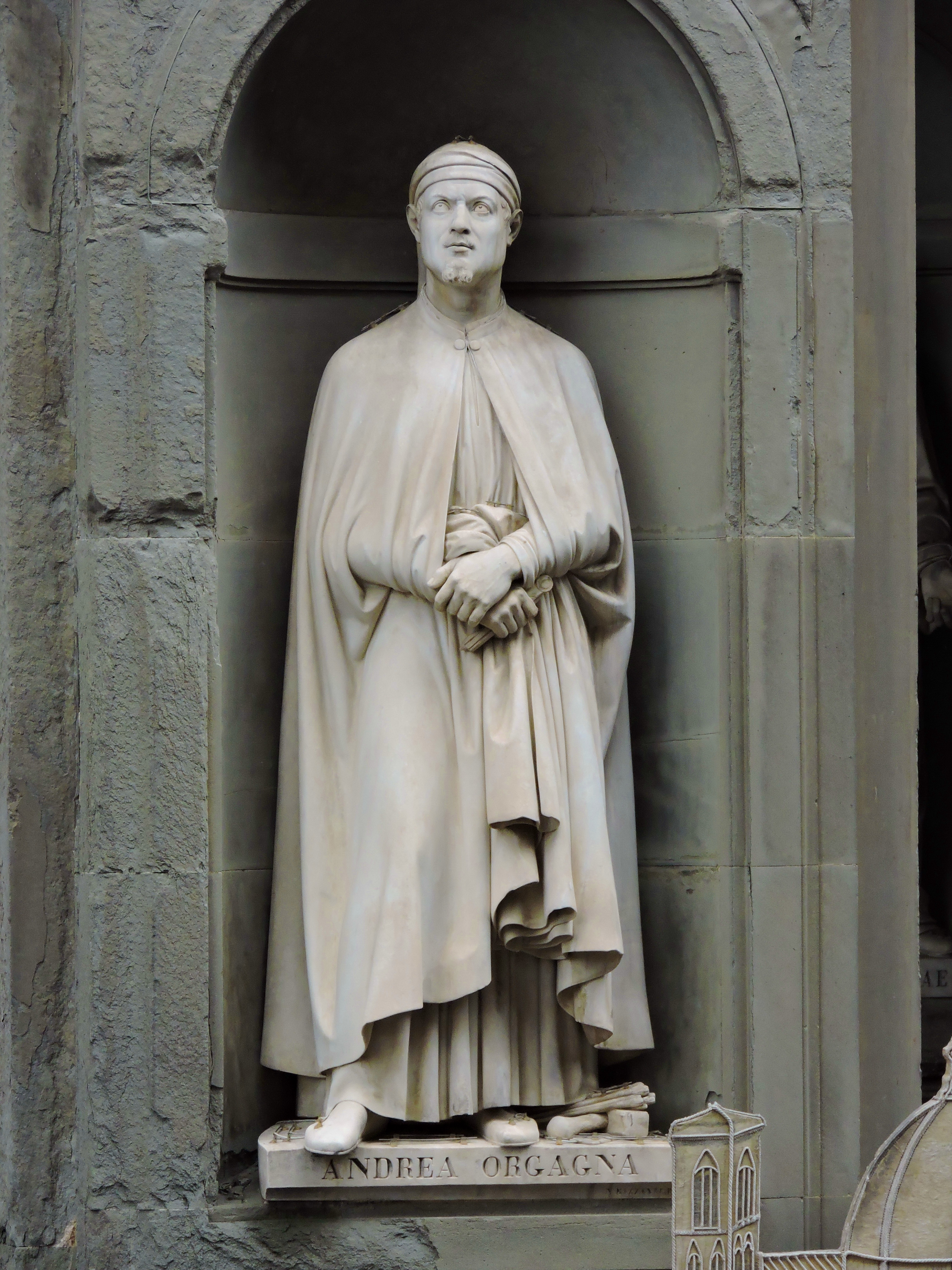
Statue of Andrea Orcagna, Uffizi Gallery, Florence, carved by Niccolò Bazzanti

In 1834, Niccolò sculpted the plastic decoration of the palace that the publisher Vincenzo Batelli had built in 1831–1832 in via Sant'Egidio at number 12. The project involved the decoration of the facade with statues of the four seasons made from Bazzanti, all gone during the last war.

Niccolò was also commissioned in 1834 to sculpt, along with other artists, the series of 28 statues of the "Illustrious Tuscany Men" for the Uffizi Gallery.

The public subscription made to finance the transaction was unsuccessful, leading Niccolò Bazzanti to complete only the statue of Andrea Di Cione (Orcagna). Niccolò is also known for producing the marble replicas of the Venus de' Medici and Apollino, which are housed in the Revoltella Museum in Trieste.

=== Exhibitions and recognition ===
In 1861, the gallery participated as a "Fine Arts Trader" at the National Exposition of Florence, showcasing several marble sculptures and various other works, and was awarded a medal in the sculpture category.

By the late 19th century, the gallery had gained international acclaim, participating in numerous exhibitions worldwide, including the Centennial Exposition (1876), the Paris Exposition (1878), the Sydney International Exhibition (1879), the Melbourne International Exhibition (1880), the Rome Exposition of Fine Arts (1883), the American Exhibition of the Products, Arts and Manufactures of Foreign Nations (1883), the World's Columbian Exposition (1893), the Paris Exposition (1900), and at the National Art Gallery of New South Wales (1917).

The gallery was also well-regarded by sculptors of the time, employing several notable sculptors, including Fortuno Galli (d. 1918), E. Giolli and Ferdinando Vichi. The studio became a centre for other important sculptors such as Cesare Lapini and Guglielmo Pugi, whose works were often inscribed with the gallery’s name, a mark of the high esteem in which the workshop was held.

=== Ownership transitions and modern era ===
In the 1870s, Niccolò sold the gallery to his American employee Thompson, who subsequently sold it to another employee, Biagioli, in the mid-1930s.

In 1960, the gallery underwent a significant transformation when the Marinelli family acquired it, introducing the production of bronzes from its own Ferdinando Marinelli Artistic Foundry. This marked a new era for the historic workshop, allowing for stricter control over the artistic quality of its works and improved export capabilities. In addition, 19th-century models inherited from previous owners were added to the extensive collection of plaster moulds of the foundry.
