= Amazon statue types =

Style of ancient Greek and Roman statues

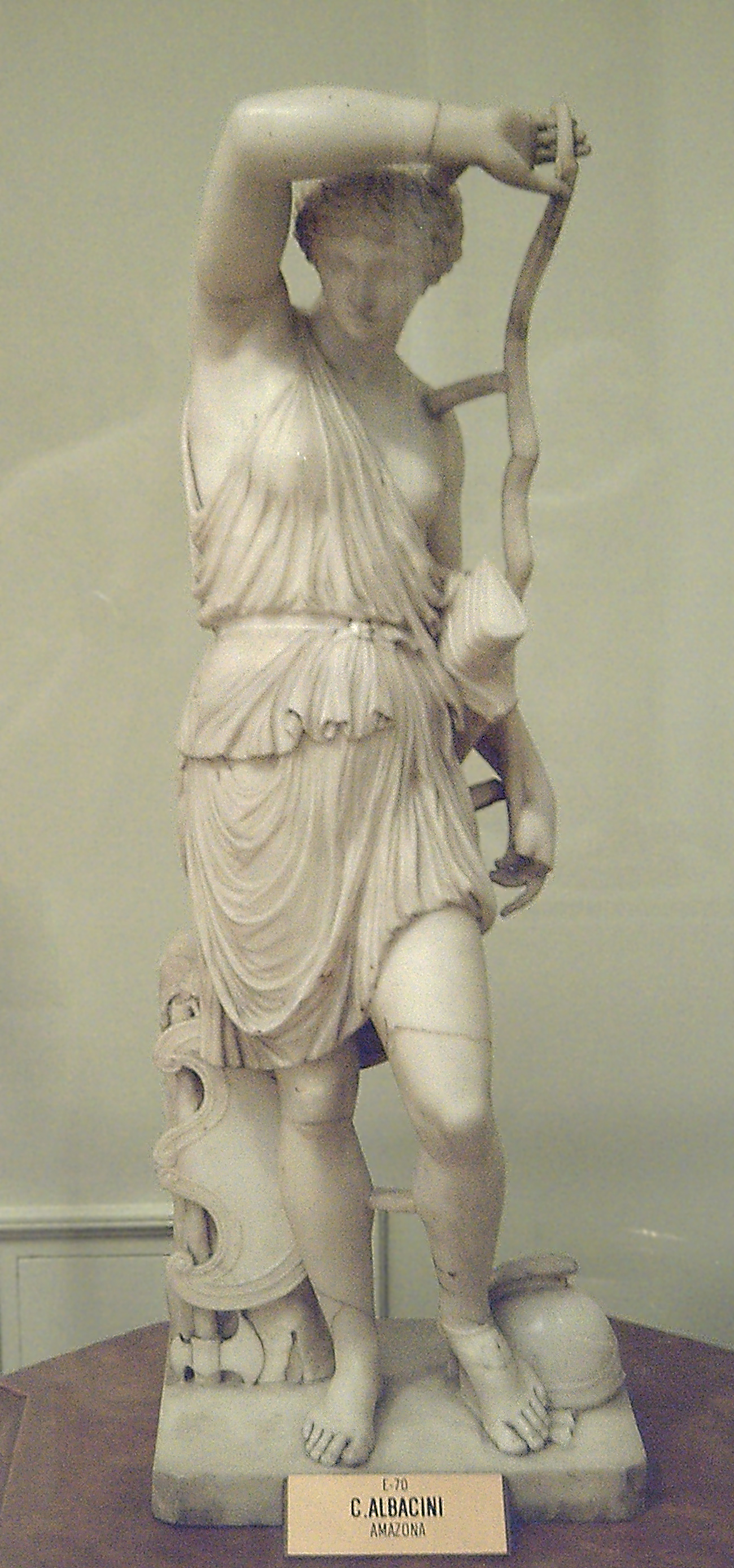
Amazon Mattei. Copy of the Greek original (440–430 BC) at the Capitoline Museums (Rome, Italy)

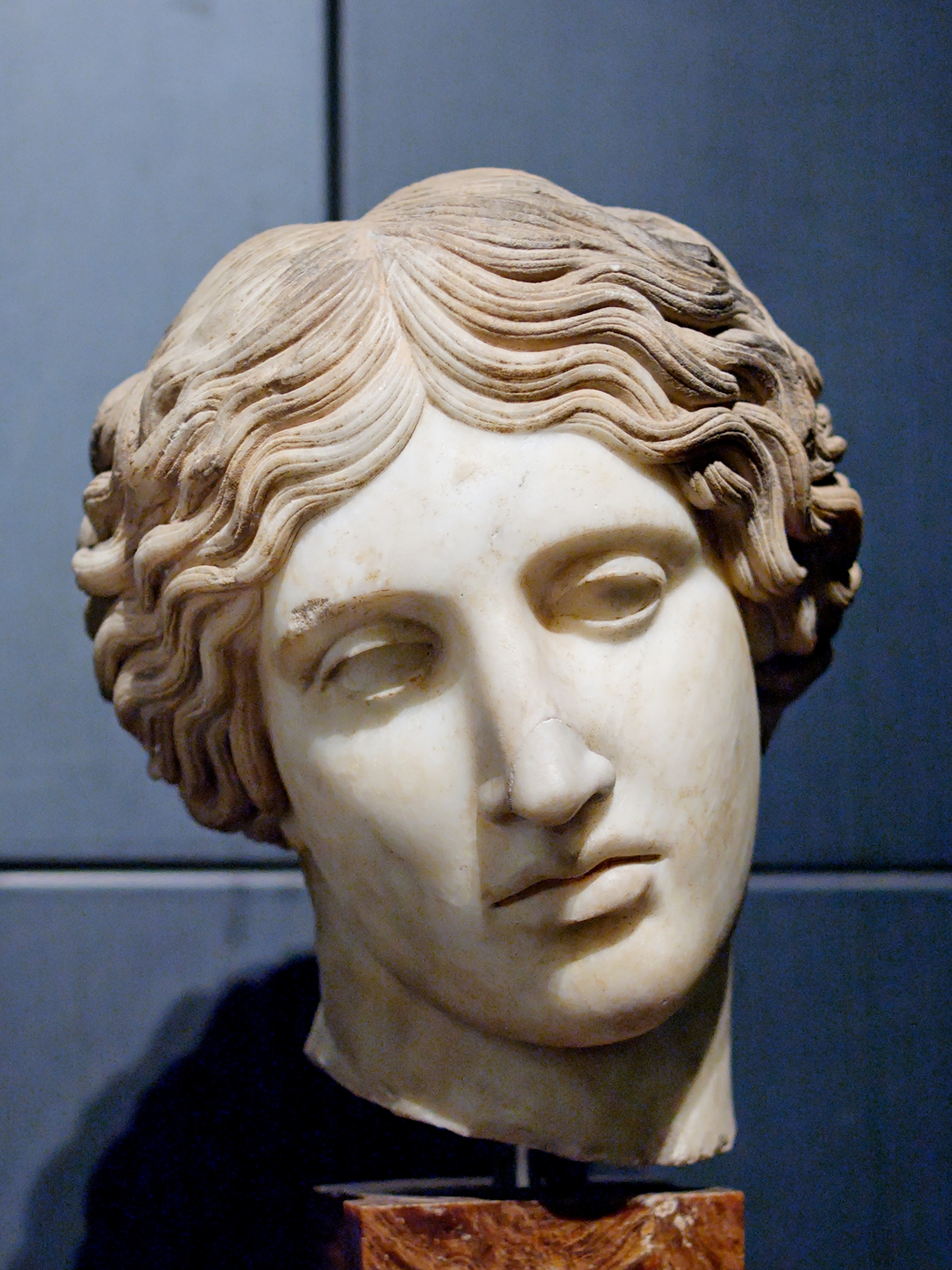
Head of the Sosicles Amazon types, found in the Gardens of Maecenas, 1874 (Capitoline Museums)

Pliny the Elder records five bronze statues of Amazons in the Artemision of Ephesus. He explains the existence of such a quantity of sculptures on the same theme in the same place by describing a 5th-century BC competition between the artists Polyclitus, Phidias, Kresilas, "Kydon" and Phradmon; thus:

The most celebrated of these artists, though born at different epochs, have joined in a trial of skill in the Amazons which they have respectively made. When these statues were dedicated in the Temple of Diana at Ephesus, it was agreed, in order to ascertain which was the best, that it should be left to the judgment of the artists themselves who were then present: upon which, it was evident that that was the best, which all the artists agreed in considering as the next best to his own. Accordingly, the first rank was assigned to Polycletus, the second to Phidias, the third to Cresilas, the fourth to Cydon, and the fifth to Phradmon.

This anecdote encouraged the much-discussed identifications of four known types of Roman marble copies of the wounded Amazon with sculptors of lost originals that may be dated to 430 BC on stylistic grounds. These types, each well represented by numerous Roman copies and heads, are identified with three of Pliny's five sculptors; a type derived from Phradmon has not been identified. Of these, however, only the identification of the Mattei type as deriving from Phidias's original is undisputed. The assignment of the Sciarra-type as deriving from Polyclitus's original and Sosicles-type as deriving from Kresilas's original (or vice versa), on the other hand, is unestablished, although having been discussed since 1897. The German scholar R. Bolnach has written a thorough form-analysis for the Sciarra/Polycletus and Sosikles/Kresilas pairings.

Dietrich von Bothmer dismissed the Plinian anecdote as an etiological embroidery invented to account for the five statues of wounded Amazons of varying styles. Brunilde Sismondo Ridgway presented her doubts ("it is difficult to see why all five Amazons were set up if only one 'won' and became the object of the dedication"), noting Pliny's awareness of the discrepancies in age of the sculptors; she presented an alternative, cumulative origin, building on fifth century prototypes, added to by Phradmon, whom she identifies as a fourth-century sculptor, and supplemented by later classicizing models.

== Types ==
The usual designations of the statues, following Adolf Furtwängler, group them under the headings the Lansdowne type, the Capitoline type, the Mattei type and the single example known as the Villa Doria Pamphilj type. A fifth type was excavated at the theater of Ephesus in 1898 but did not enter the discussion until the 1950s.

All five types show a standing female with a similar head and face, and (as with the Venus Genetrix) are clothed in a peplos that has fallen from one or both shoulders to leave her bare-breasted. Their differences are most obvious when the three sculptures, or casts thereof, are displayed together, as at the Casts Gallery at the Cambridge Classics Faculty. The pose, with one arm resting on the head, is comparable to that of the Apollo Lykeios.

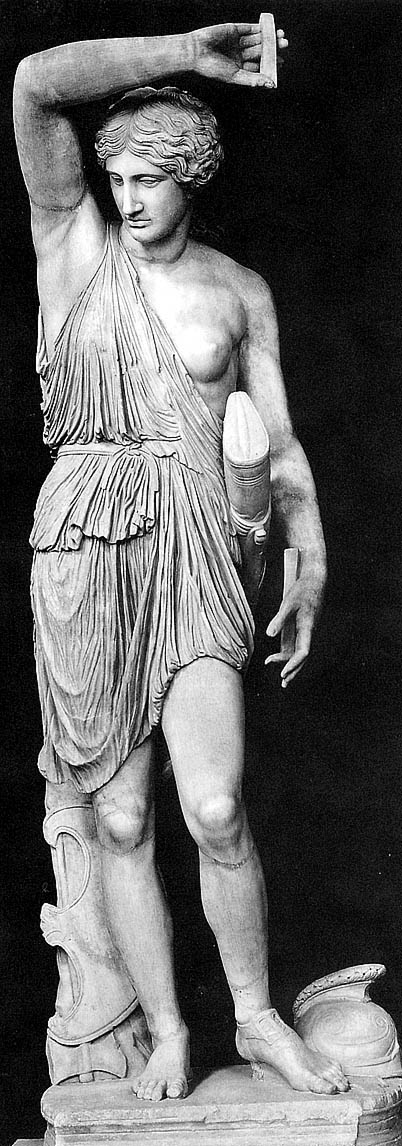
Mattei Amazon, Vatican Museum

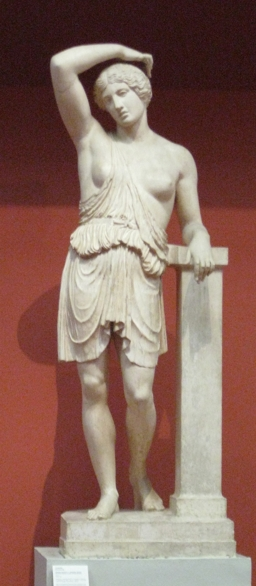
Wounded Amazon, "Lansdowne type", said to be after Polyclitus (Cast in Pushkin Museum)

=== Amazon Mattei type ===
The prototype was discovered in 1770, as a marble Roman copy of a bronze original, and came into the Mattei collection. 2.11 m (6 ft 11 in) high, and of the Augustan era, this type is derived from Phidias's original. It is now on display in the Gallerie delle Statue of the Pio-Clementine Museum in the Vatican. The figure looks down, with her right arm parrying and her left arm by her side with a quiver under it, though both arms, the head, and the left shoulder are all restorations. Another copy of this type is at the Capitoline Museum.

=== Amazon Sciarra type ===
1.94 m (6 ft 4 in) high, this copy dates to the era of Tiberius and is derived from Polyclitus's or Kresilas's original. It was found in Rome in 1868 in the Gardens of Sallust, and is now in the Ny Carlsberg Glyptotek, Copenhagen, The figure is resting her left arm on a column and her right hand behind her head, with her face leaning to one side. Her nose, right arm from the deltoid muscle downwards, the left forearm below the elbow, both hands, and the right foot and ankle have all been restored since discovery.

=== Amazon "Capitoline" or Sosicles type ===
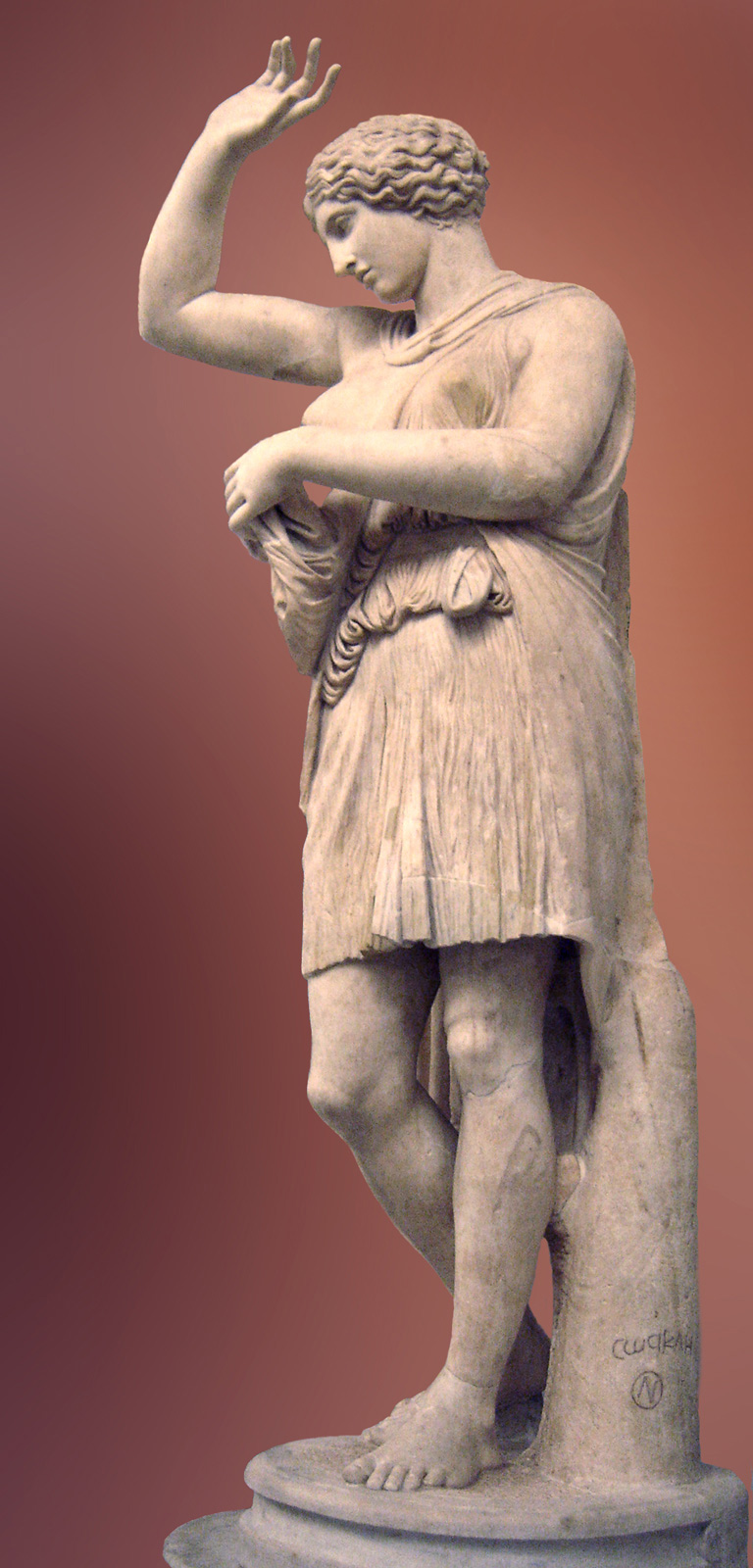
Wounded Amazon, Roman copy signed by Sosikles

This type is known principally from the 2.02 m (6 ft 8 in) high 2nd century AD marble copy (signed by Sosicles), deriving from Polyclitus's or Kresilas's original. It was discovered in 1733, went into the collection of Cardinal Giuseppe Albani, and is now in the Capitoline Museums, Rome (Room 33). The figure has her left arm across her body below her breasts, and her right hand raised and open-palmed, as she looks down towards the wound in her right-hand side. She wears a baldric. The tip of nose, lower lip, left forearm, and hand with drapery have been restored since discovery.

It was (before and after Sosicles's time) copied as a complete statue, as a bust or as a herm, both in stone in the same size as the original and in miniature in bronze.

=== Lansdowne Amazon ===
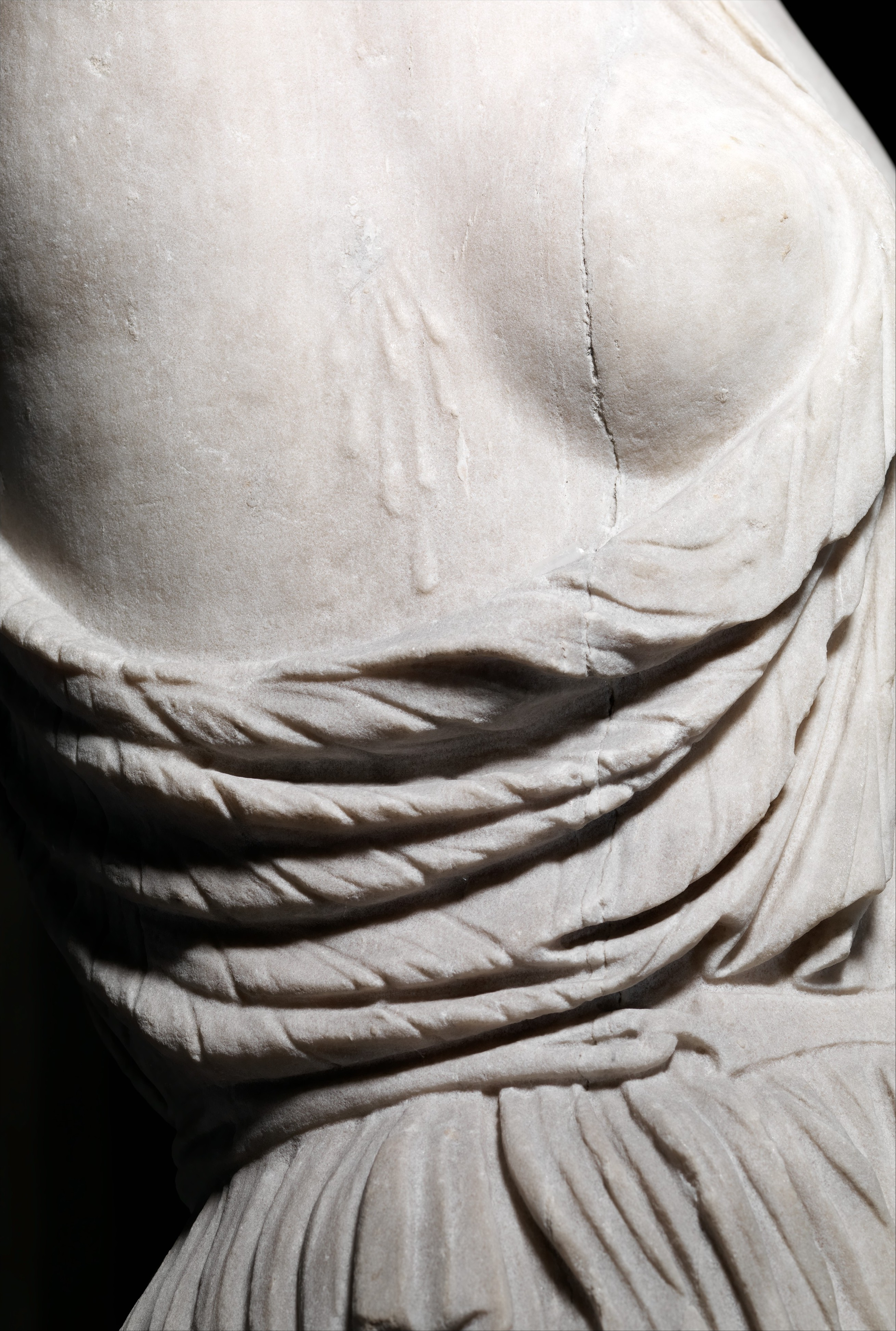
Detail of the Lansdowne Amazon (Metropolitan Museum of Art)

A possible fourth is the Lansdowne Amazon, said to have been found in Tor Colombara by Gavin Hamilton, though it may be a variant on the Sciarra-type. Later at Lansdowne House, it is now at the Metropolitan Museum of Art. The right arm and lower legs have been restored.

=== Villa Doria Pamphilj Amazon ===
Adolf Furtwängler attributed a much-restored Wounded Amazon at the Villa Doria Pamphilj, Rome, to the Ephesus group, an attribution that was challenged in 1951 by C.P. Sestieri, who identified the sculpture instead as a classicising Roman work, and a representation of Diana. Dietrich von Bothmer's systematic study omitted the Dori-Pamphilj sculpture as insecurely identified and too much restored, while H. von Steuben in W. Helbig, Führer durch die öffentlichen Sammlungen klassischer Altertümer in Rom, (Tübingen) 4th ed. identifies it as an eclectic classicizing work modelled on the Lansdowne Wounded Amazon.

== Ephesus Amazon ==
A fifth Amazon type was unearthed at the theatre of Ephesus in 1898 but languished unpublished.
