= Venus de' Medici =

Sculpture by Cleomenes the Athenian

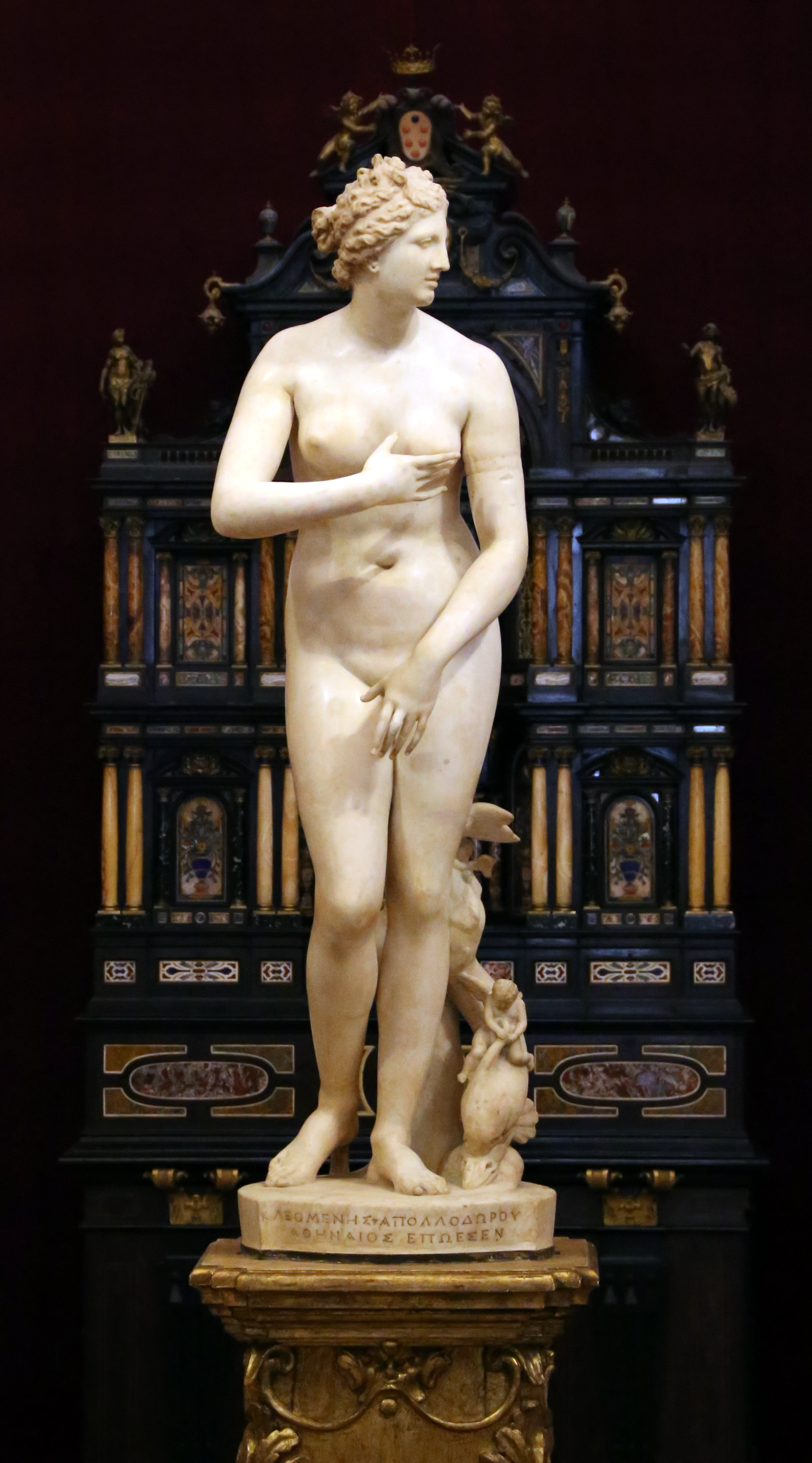
- Year: 1st century BCE
- Type: Marble
- Location: Uffizi Gallery, Florence

The Venus de' Medici or Medici Venus is a 1.53 m (5 ft 0 in) tall Hellenistic marble sculpture depicting the Greek goddess of love Aphrodite. It is a 1st-century BC marble copy, perhaps made in Athens, of a bronze original Greek sculpture, following the type of the Aphrodite of Knidos, which would have been made by a sculptor in the immediate Praxitelean tradition, perhaps at the end of the 4th century BC. It has become one of the navigation points by which the progress of the Western classical tradition is traced; the references to it outline the changes of taste and the process of classical scholarship. It is housed in the Uffizi Gallery, Florence, Italy.

== Origin ==
The statue depicts the goddess in a fugitive, momentary pose, as if surprised in the act of emerging from the sea, to which the dolphin at her feet alludes. The dolphin would not have been a necessary support for the bronze original.

The statue base bears the Greek inscription ΚΛΕΟΜΕΝΗΣ ΑΠΟΛΛΟΔΩΡΟΥ ΑΘΗΝΑΙΟΣ ΕΠΩΕΣΕΝ, literally "Kleomenes (son) of Apollodoros of Athens made it." The inscription is not original, but in the 18th century the name "Cleomenes" was forged on sculptures of modest quality to enhance their value, while the inscription on the Venus de' Medici was doubted in order to ascribe the work to one of various highly-thought-of names: besides Praxiteles or the less-likely names of Phidias or Scopas. The restoration of the arms was done by Ercole Ferrata, who gave them long tapering Mannerist fingers that did not begin to be recognized as out of keeping with the sculpture until the 19th century.

The Venus de' Medici is the name piece under which are recognized many replicas and fragments of this particular version of Praxiteles' theme, which introduced the life size nude representation of Aphrodite. Though this particular variant is not identifiable in any extant literature, it must have been widely known to Greek and Roman connoisseurs. Among replicas and fragments of less importance, the closest in character and finest in quality is a marble Aphrodite at the Metropolitan Museum of Art in New York City, described below.

Such sculptures are described as "Roman copies", with the understanding that these were produced, often by Greek sculptors, anywhere under Roman hegemony "say, between the dictatorship of Sulla and the removal of the Capital to Constantinople, 81 BC to AD 330". Their quality may vary from work produced by a fine sculptor for a discerning patron, to commonplace copies mass-produced for gardens.

== Discovery and display ==
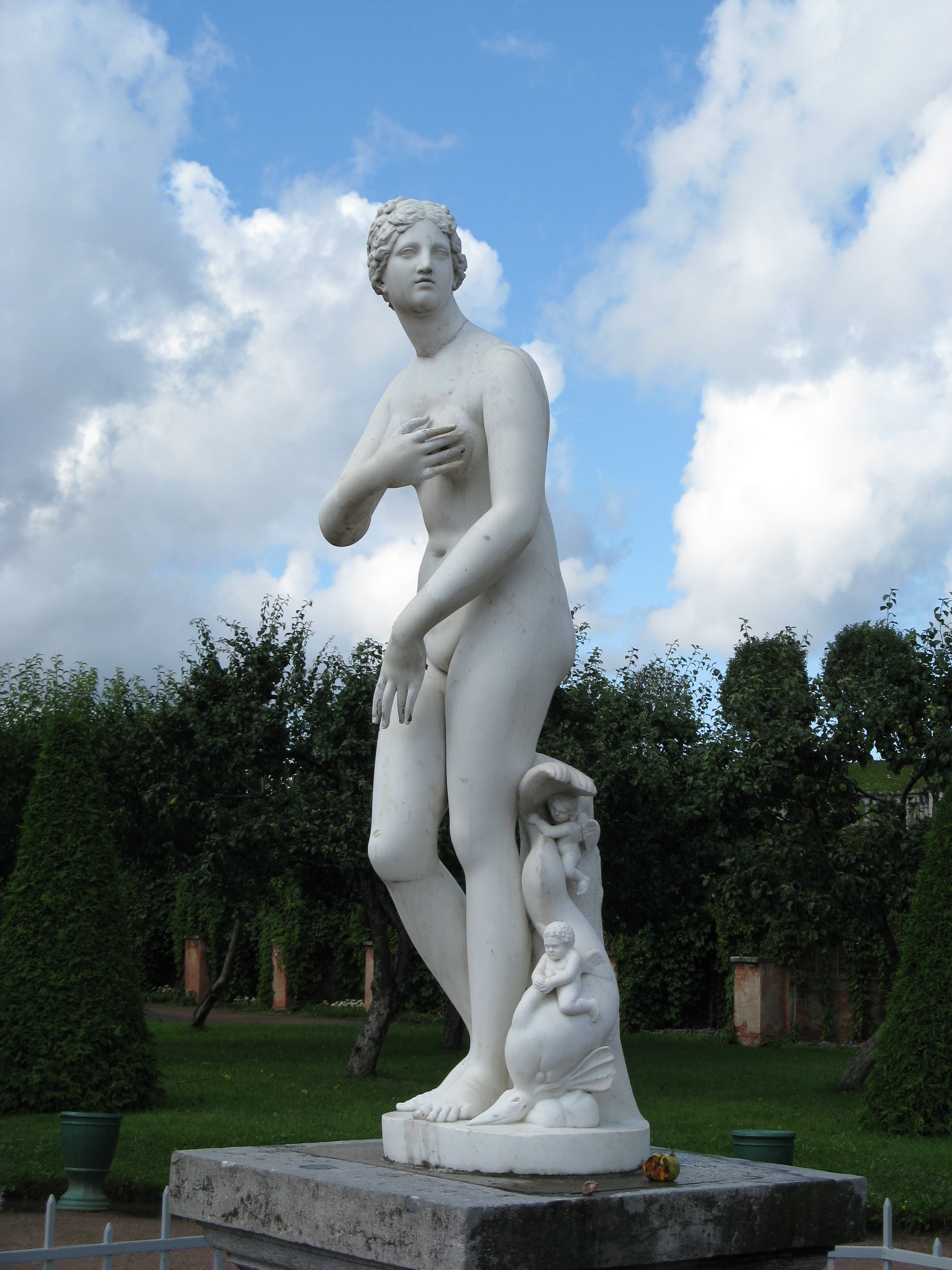
18th-century marble copy of the Venus de' Medici at Peterhof, St Petersburg

The origin of the Venus is undocumented: "its reputation seems to have grown up gradually", Francis Haskell and Nicholas Penny remarked. It was published in the collection at the Villa Medici, Rome, in 1638, given three plates in the anthology of the most noble sculptures that the ravages of time had spared in Rome compiled by François Perrier, Segmenta nobilia signorum et statuarum que temporis dentem invidium evase, Rome 1638. The Venus was already known by 1559, it now appears, for a bronze reduction of it was among the series of the most famous Roman sculptures that were featured on a cabinet completed in that year; it was commissioned by Niccolò Orsini, Count of Pitigliano, as a gift to Philip II of Spain: the sculptures were by the Dutch sculptor trained in Benvenuto Cellini's atelier, Willem van Tetrode, called Guglielmo Fiammingo in Italy.

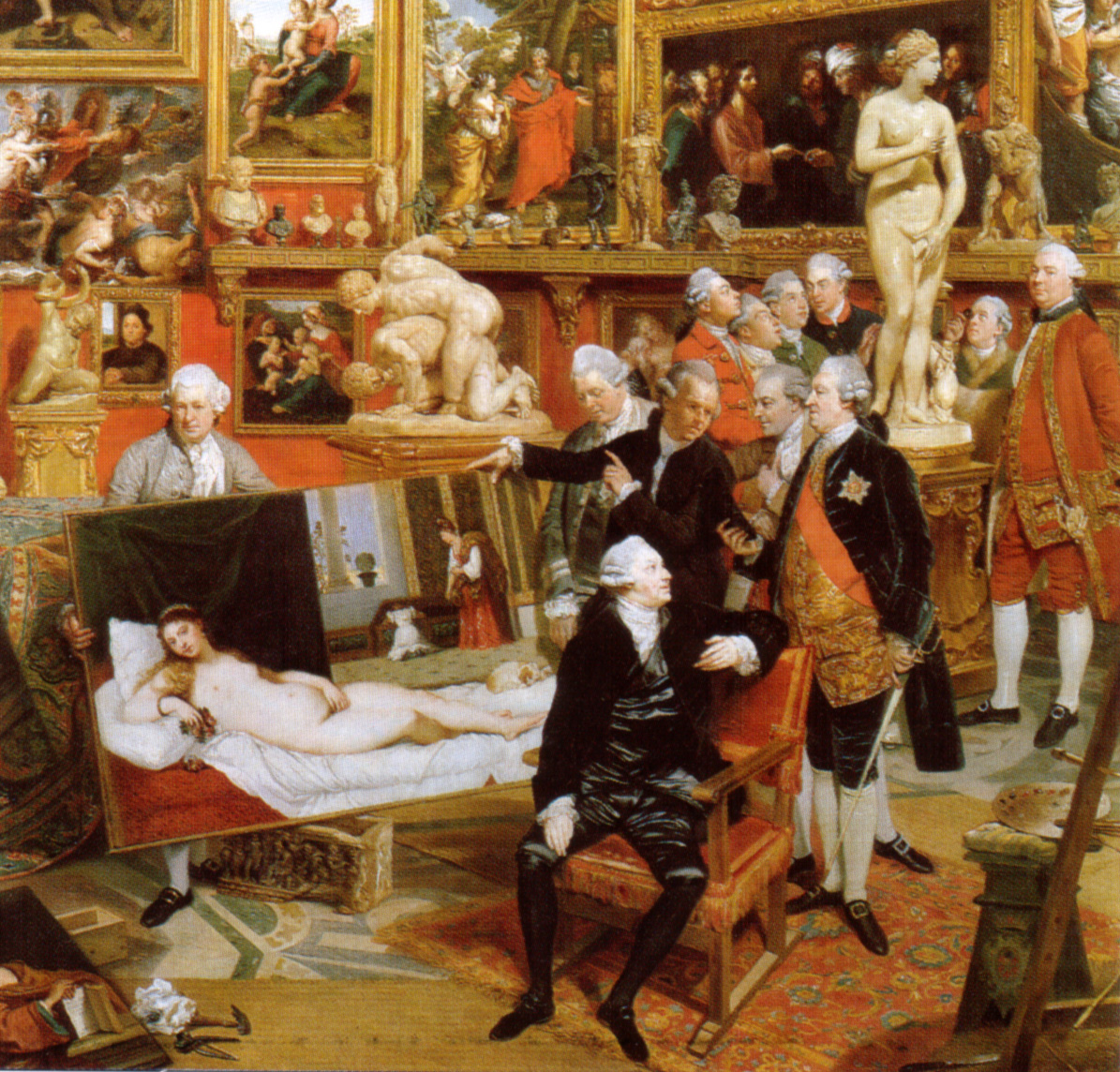
Detail of John Zoffany's 1772 painting The Tribuna of the Uffizi (now in the Royal Collection), showing the Venus (right) on show in the Tribuna, surrounded by English and Italian connoisseurs.

Though visitors to Rome like John Evelyn found it "a miracle of art", it was sent to Florence in August 1677, its export permitted by Innocent XI because, it was thought, it stimulated lewd behavior. In the Tribuna of the Uffizi it was a high point of the Grand Tour and was universally esteemed as one of the half-dozen finest antique statues to have survived, until a reaction in taste began to set in during the 19th century, in the form of a few dissenting voices (Haskell and Penny p. 325). Luca Giordano made hundreds of drawings of it, Samuel Rogers made daily appointments with it, Zoffany included it in his 1778 Tribuna of the Uffizi, and Lord Byron devoted five stanzas of Childe Harold to describing it. It was one of the precious works of art shipped to Palermo in 1800 to escape the French, to no avail: such diplomatic pressure was brought to bear that the Vénus de Medicis was shipped to Paris in 1803. After Napoleon's fall, it was returned to Florence, arriving on 27 December 1815.

== The Metropolitan Museum's Aphrodite ==
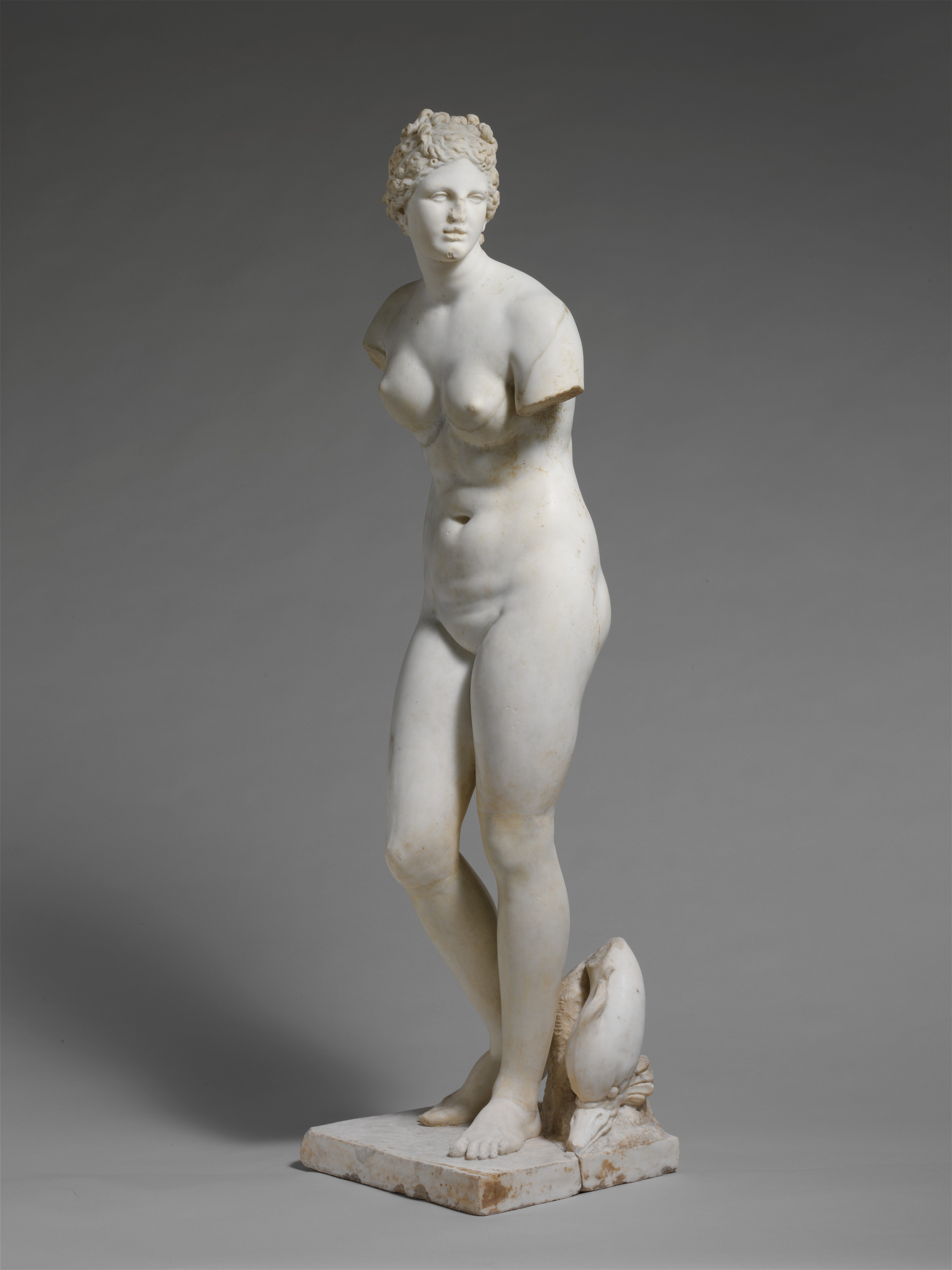
Aphrodite (Metropolitan Museum of Art)

The marble Aphrodite at the Metropolitan Museum of Art is a close replica of the Venus de' Medici. The pose of the head is not in doubt, for it did not break off when other breaks occurred, in which the arms were irrevocably lost. On the plinth is the left foot, with part of the dolphin-and-tree-trunk support, and a trace of the missing right foot, restored by a cast, for the sculpture was in two sections, which were joined by casts taken of the Venus de' Medici's lower legs. For dating the replicas, attention is focused on the minor details of the dolphins that were added by the copyists, in which stylistic conventions come to the fore: the Metropolitan dates its Aphrodite of the Medici type to the Augustan period.

The Metropolitan Aphrodite was in the collection of Count von Harbuval genannt Chamaré in Silesia, whose progenitor Count Schlabrendorf made the Grand Tour and corresponded with Johann Joachim Winckelmann.

== Modern copies ==
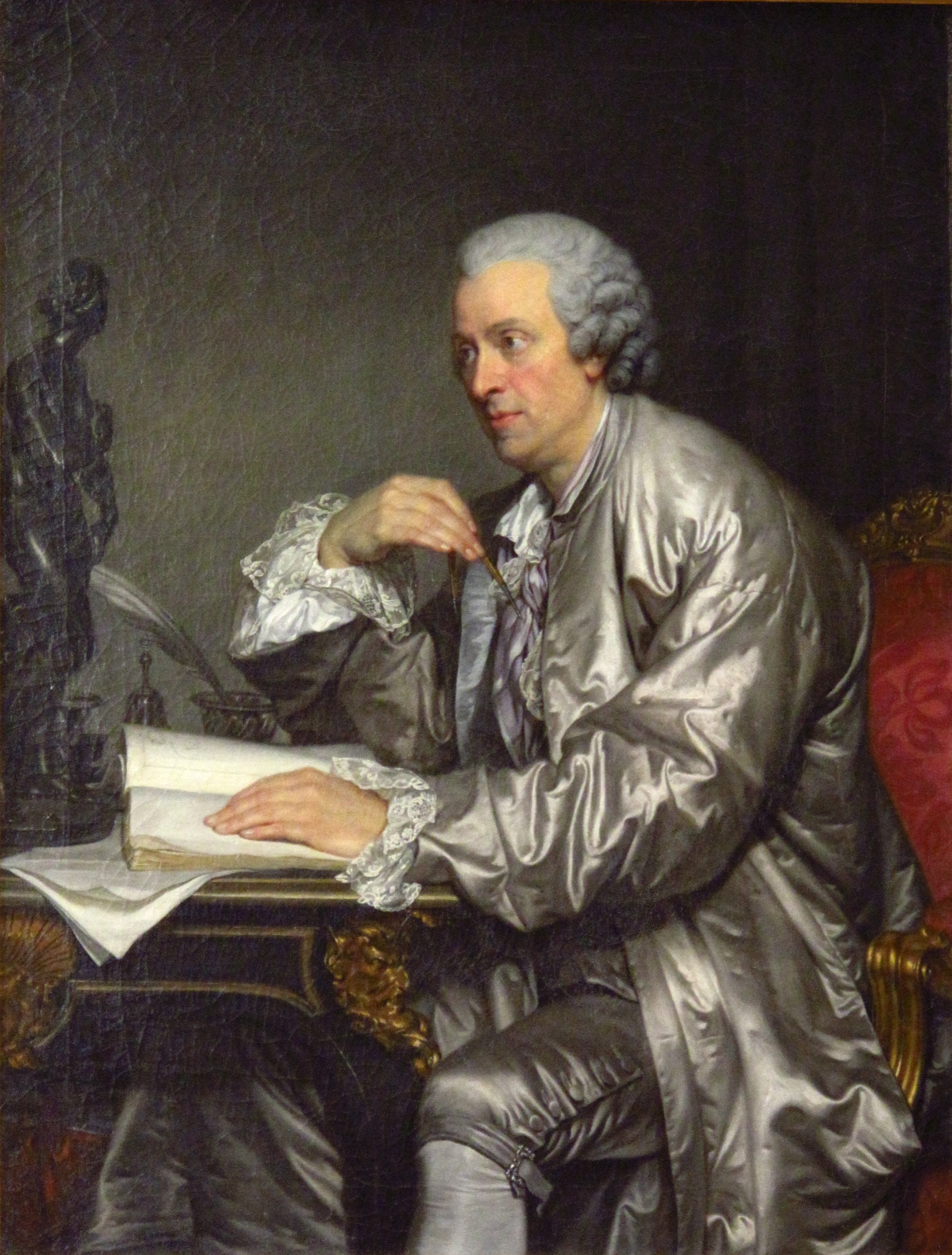
Watelet confronts the Venus de' Medici, ca. 1765., portrait by Greuze

The Medici Venus is one of the most-copied antiquities. Louis XIV had no fewer than five: marbles by Carlier, Clérion, Coysevox and Frémery, and a bronze by Jean-Jacques Keller and his brother, Jean-Balthazar Keller. (Haskell and Penny, p. 325). Copies of the Venus de' Medici in lead stand in many English and European gardens, sometimes protected by small temples; in small bronze reductions it figured among the most familiar of the antiquities represented in collectors' cabinets: in Greuze's portrait of Claude-Henri Watelet, ca 1763–65, the connoisseur and author of L'Art de peindre is shown with calipers and a notebook, regarding a bronze statuette of the Venus de' Medici, as if in the act of deducing the ideal proportions of the female figure from the sculpture's example. The Venus de' Medici was even reproduced in Sèvres biscuit porcelain, which had the matte whiteness of marble.

American sculptor Hiram Powers based his 1844 statue The Greek Slave on the Venus de' Medici.

A replica in white Carrara Marble of the Venus' hand carved by Niccolò Bazzanti is located at the Pietro Bazzanti e Figlio Art Gallery of Florence at Museo Civico Revoltella, Trieste.
