= Jean-Baptiste Vietty =

French sculptor

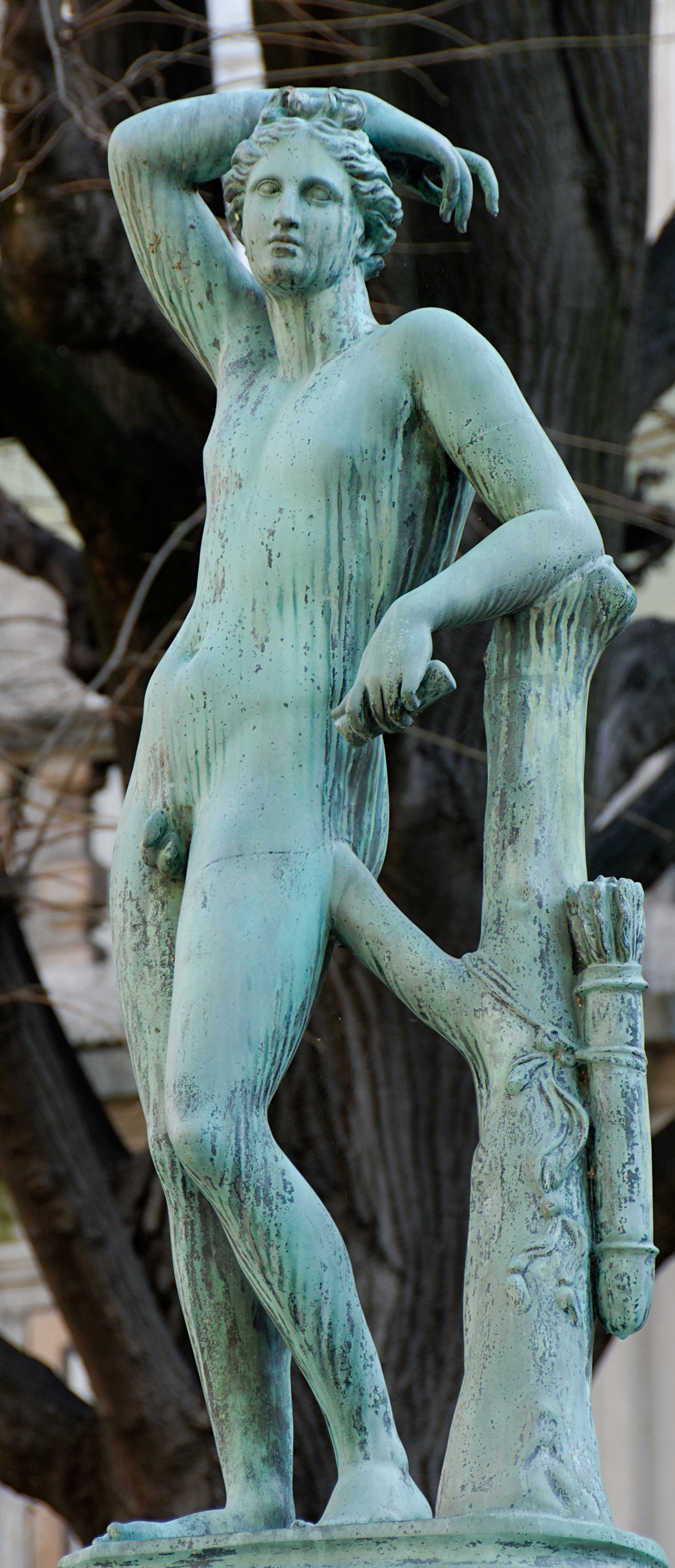
Vietty's Apollino (Musée des Beaux-Arts of Lyon)

Jean-Baptiste Vietty, (14 December 1787 – 1842) was a French sculptor and archaeologist.

Born at Amplepuis in the département of the Rhône, the son of a decorative plasterworker of Italian origin, Vietty worked in the ateliers of the painter Pierre Cogell, then of the sculptor and medallist Pierre Cartellier and the neoclassical sculptor Joseph Chinard. Vietty was placed in command of the sculptures being executed for the stock exchange of Saint Petersburg. At the Salon of 1822 he showed a plaster of the Nymphe de la Seine. At the Salon of 1824 he received the médaille d’or for a Homère méditant l’Iliade, His bronze version of the Medici Apollino in Florence is a fountain figure in the garden of the Musée des Beaux-Arts of Lyon (illustration).

A professor both of the fine arts and the classical languages, in 1831 he published a historic and analytic study of the Roman and Gothic monuments of Vienne, with drawings by Étienne Rey.

Jean-Baptiste Vietty found a place among the scholars and artists of the Institut de France's Morea Expedition in 1829. A man of independent temperament, he and Edgar Quinet decided, however, to separate themselves from the other members of the expedition shortly after the team's arrival in Greece in March 1829. The two subsequently split and Quinet was forced by illness to return to France. Vietty, ignoring official orders to return to France in November, continued his research in the Peloponnese and Attica until the summer of 1831. Upon his return to France the commission for the Morea expedition examined his manuscripts and, judging them of exceptional value, recommended them for publication. Unable to complete his work by 1835, when his stipend ran out, Vietty accepted commissions for sculpture. Between 1835 and 1841, under financial constraints, Vietty pawned his manuscripts and drawings in order to survive.

He died at Tarare in the Rhône, without having published a single page of his research in the Morea. A posthumous eulogy at the Académie des Inscriptions et Belles Lettres in 1858 presented him as

one of the most remarkable scientific and artistic personalities of our day... A great artist, a true scholar, he loved Science and Art for themselves, without ambition, without recompense, retaining in poverty all his admiration and enthusiasm. There are many who will mourn him, and yet he was a happy man. It is much to be desired that the Académie des Inscriptions et Belles Lettres confide the examination and cataloguing of his papers to a special commission, or at the least to an eminent Hellenist

.

Nevertheless, all his manuscript notes on Greece have been lost, with the exception of two notebooks rediscovered in 2005 and partly edited.
