= Pericles with the Corinthian helmet =

Ancient Roman marble busts

Coordinates: 52.5208°N 13.3964°E

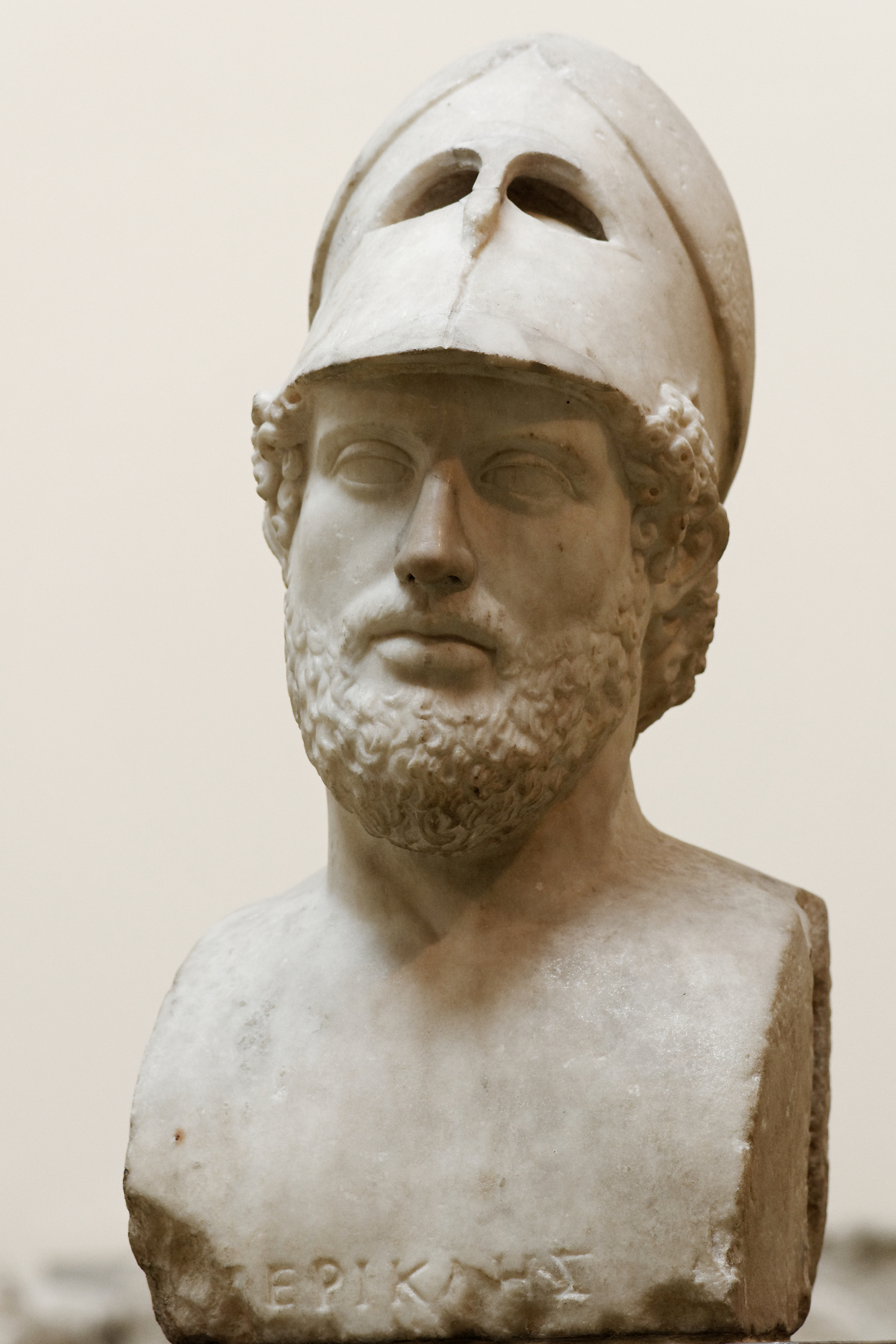
Bust in the British Museum

The statue of Pericles with the Corinthian Helmet is a lost, life-sized statue of the Athenian statesman and general Pericles. Today, only some of the base survives. Four Roman Imperial-era marble busts modelled after the head of the statue are known.

== Portrait ==
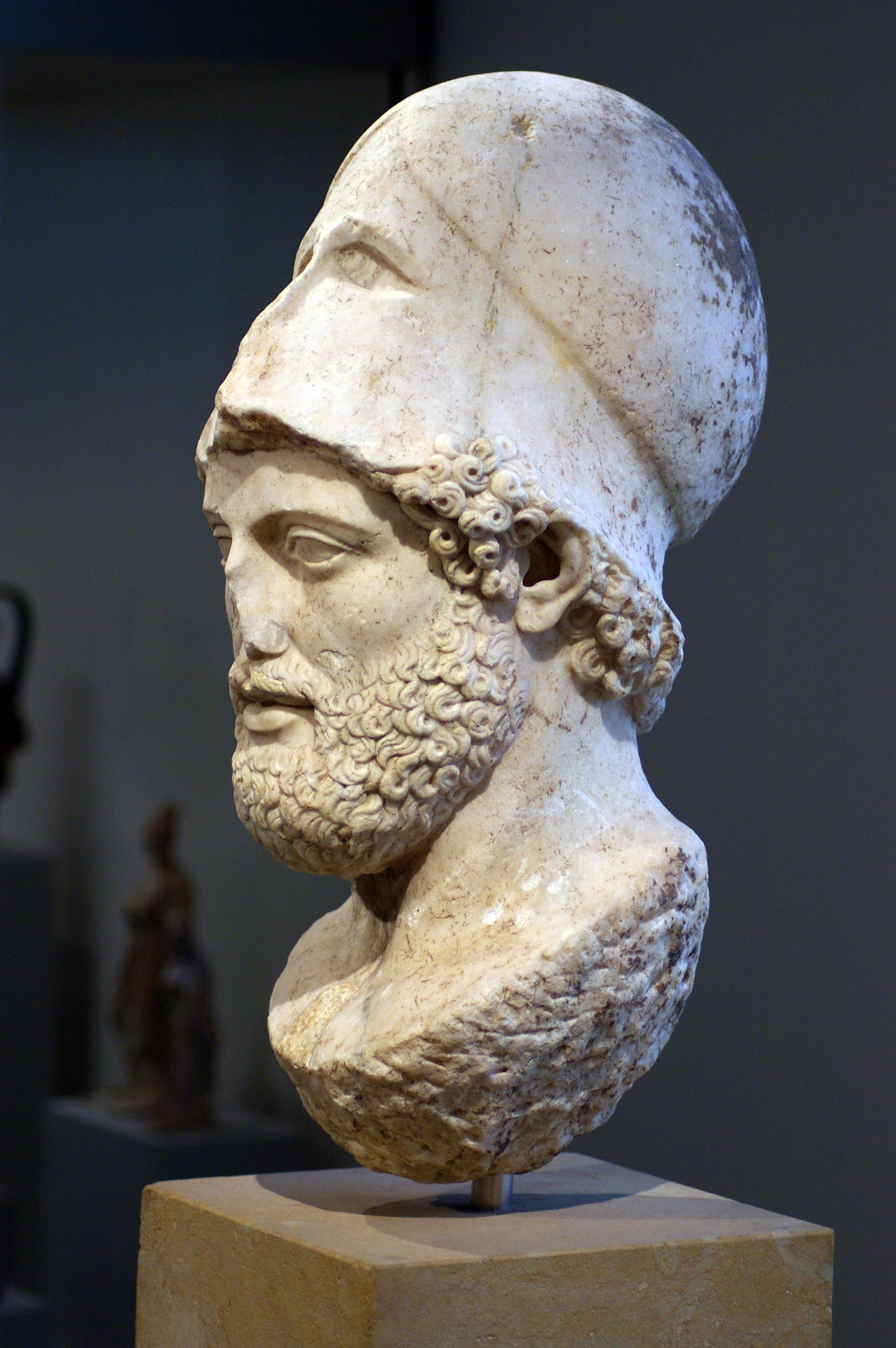
Bust in the Berlin Antikensammlung

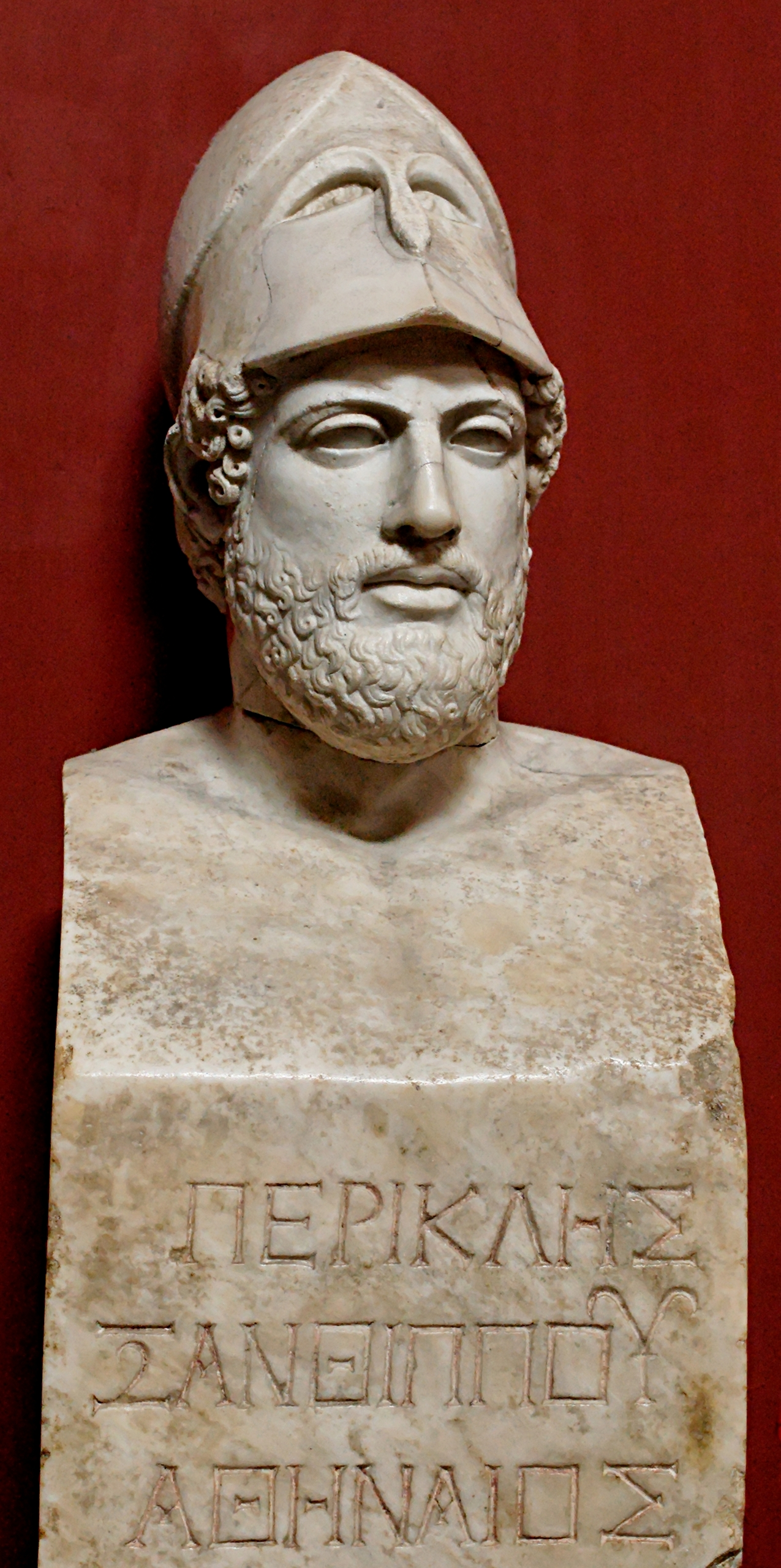
Bust in the Vatican Museum with inscription

The Roman copies of the bust of Pericles derive from a bronze statue made by the sculptor Kresilas. This life-size statue was probably installed on the Athenian Acropolis at or shortly after the death of the politician. Pausanias says that the statue was directly beyond the Propylaea, the gate to the Acropolis. Since this statue is not preserved and only limited information is known about it, its arrangement is unclear and its details can only be guessed at by analogies and assumptions. Pericles was not shown in a realistic fashion, but as an idealised image of the long-serving strategos. Whether he was depicted naked, clothed or in full armour is disputed. Remains of the statue's base were preserved with a dedicatory inscription. A slot in the base indicates that the statue held a spear in its left hand. The slight turning of the head indicates that the statue employed classical Contrapposto.

Pericles is depicted as an adult man with a Corinthian helmet. The helmet symbolised his military role as strategos. The Berlin copy is especially carefully executed. The helmet is cocked back, with short curly hair bursting out at the temples. The beard is tightly cropped with many small, well-ordered curls. Broad, even eyelids ring the eyes and eyebrows are carved above. His full lips are slightly open. Behind the eyeholes of his helmet, further hair can be seen (as in two of the three other copies). This hair, far above where his head would be expected to end, might hint at Pericles' unusually shaped head, which is occasionally referenced in Attic Comedy by the abusive nickname "Leek-head." (Also see Plutarch's 'Life of Perikles') This deformity was said to be the reason why Pericles was always depicted in a Corinthian helmet, since this would conceal the height of his head. The presence of the hair in the eyeholes should probably therefore be seen as the addition of a learned sculptor.

Kresilas created a kind of symbol of the Athenian democracy with this image of Pericles. However the sculpture also conformed to the broadly accepted citizen ideal of the times and employed the calm and collected facial expression which was the contemporary ideal. As a result, the realistic tendencies of Athenian art, which are found to some extent in the bust of Themistocles were abandoned. The expression is serious, showing no emotion. In this the depiction squares with self-controlled personality attributed to Pericles in the historical tradition. The identification of this idealised figure with Pericles is made because two of the copies are inscribed: one in the Vatican Museum, the other in the British Museum.

== Copies ==
- Berlin, Antikensammlung Inventory Number: Sk 1530 (K 127), found on Lesbos, acquired on the art market in 1901, height 0.54 m
- London, British Museum (Townley Pericles) Inventory Number GR 1805.7-3.91 (Cat. Sculpture 549), found in the Villa of Hadrian, height 0.48 m, Inscription ΠΕΡΙΚΛΗΣ (Perikles)
- Rome, Museo Barracco, Inventory Number 96, acquired in 1884 from the collection of Augusto Castellani, height 0.40 m
- Vatican, Vatican Museum, Museo Pio-Clementino Inventory number 269, found in the Villa of Brutus at Tivoli, height 1.83 m, Inscription ΠΕΡΙΚΛΗΣ ΞΑΝΘΙΠΠΟΥ ΑΘHΝΑΙΟΣ (Perikles, Son of Xanthippos, Athenian)

== Bibliography ==
- Max Kunze, "Bildnis des Perikles mit korinthischem Helm." In Die Antikensammlung im Pergamonmuseum und in Charlottenburg. von Zabern, Mainz 1992, ISBN 3-8053-1187-7, pp. 152f.
- Ralf Krumeich, Bildnisse griechischer Herrscher und Staatsmänner im 5. Jahrhundert v. Chr. 1997, pp. 118ff.
- Die griechische Klassik. Idee oder Wirklichkeit. Exhibition catalogue Berlin, Bonn 2002. Mainz, Zabern 2002, ISBN 3-8053-2854-0, pp. 232–233.
- Michael Siebler. Griechische Kunst. Taschen, Köln 2007, ISBN 978-3-8228-5447-1, pp. 76–77.
