= Sosicles (sculptor) =

Greek sculptor

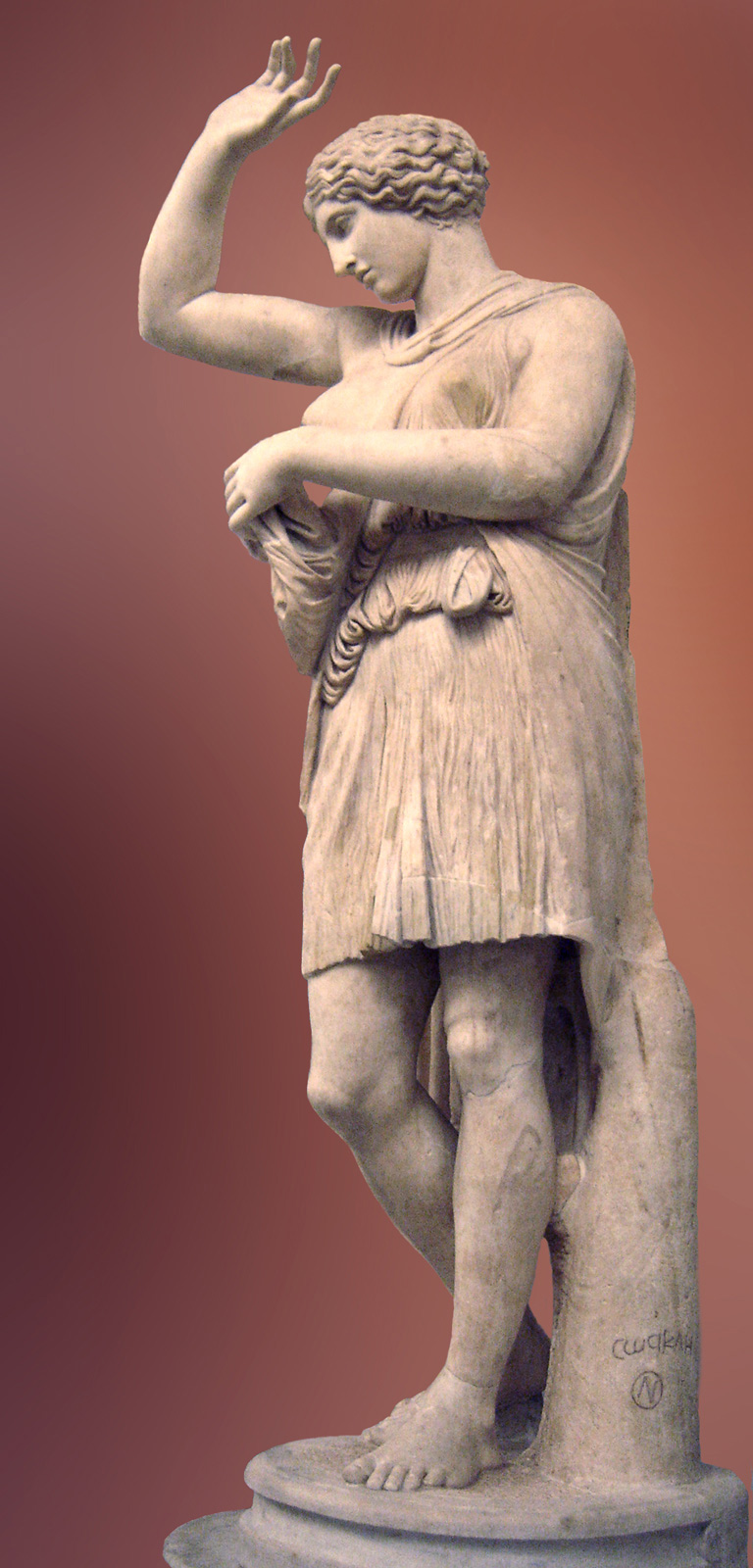
Amazon Sosicles type (Capitoline Museums).

Sosicles (Ancient Greek: Σωσικλῆς) was a Roman sculptor in the mid 2nd century AD. He worked as copyist of ancient Greek masterpieces. He is known from his signature shown on a marble plinth from Tusculum and the column of a marble statue of a wounded Amazon (originally in the collection of Alessandro Albani, Inv. D19; now in the Capitoline Museums, Inv. MC 0651). The marble statue is one of the three Amazon statue types.
