= Corinthian helmet =

Type of helmet used in Ancient Greece

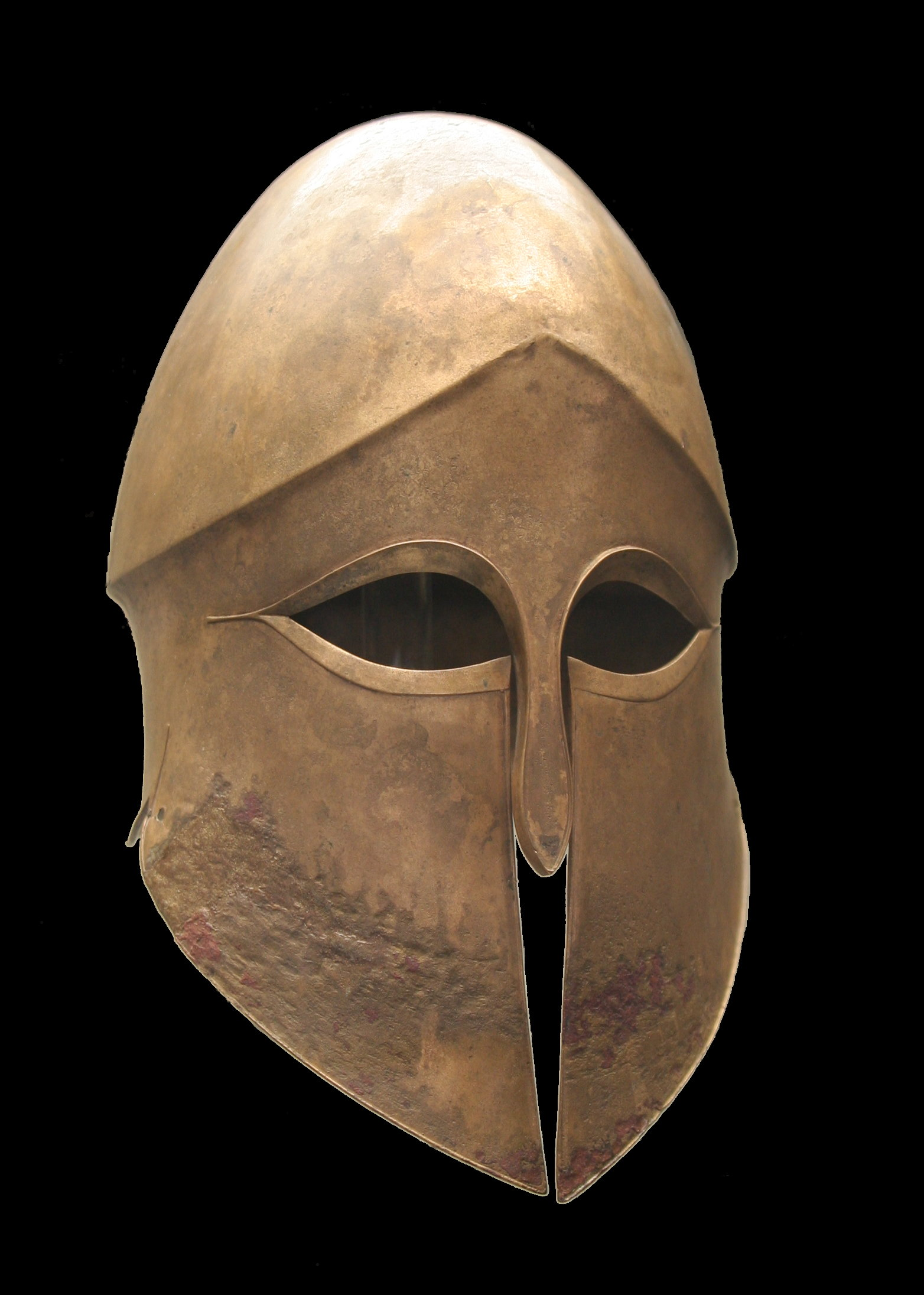
Bronze Corinthian helmet, c. 500 BCE, Staatliche Antikensammlungen (Inv. 4330)

The Corinthian helmet originated in ancient Greece and took its name from the city-state of Corinth. It was a helmet made of bronze which in its later styles covered the entire head and neck, with slits for the eyes and mouth. A large curved projection protected the nape of the neck.

Out of combat, a Greek hoplite would wear the helmet tipped upward for comfort. This practice gave rise to a series of variant forms in Italy, where the slits were almost closed, since the helmet was no longer pulled over the face but worn cap-like. Although the classical Corinthian helmet fell out of use among the Greeks in favour of more open types, the Italo-Corinthian types remained in use until the 1st century AD, being used, among others, by the Roman army.

== Physical evidence ==
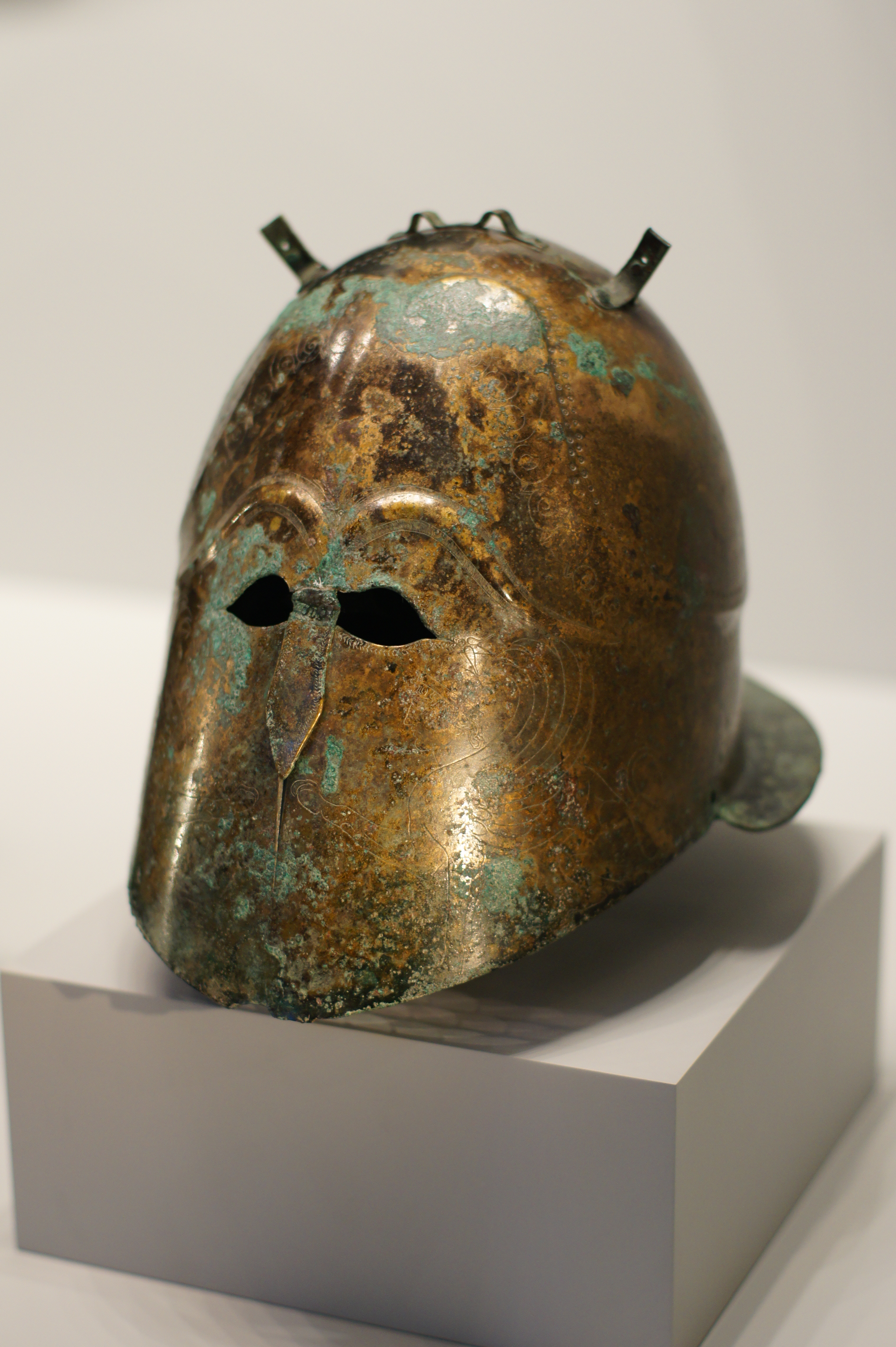
Italo-Corinthian helmet, Getty Villa

Apparently (judging from artistic and archaeological evidence) the most popular helmet during the Archaic and early Classical periods, the style gradually gave way to the more open Thracian helmet, Chalcidian helmet and the much simpler pilos type, which was less expensive to manufacture and did not obstruct the wearer's critical senses of vision and hearing as the Corinthian helmet did. Numerous examples of Corinthian helmets have been excavated, and they are frequently depicted on ancient Greek pottery.

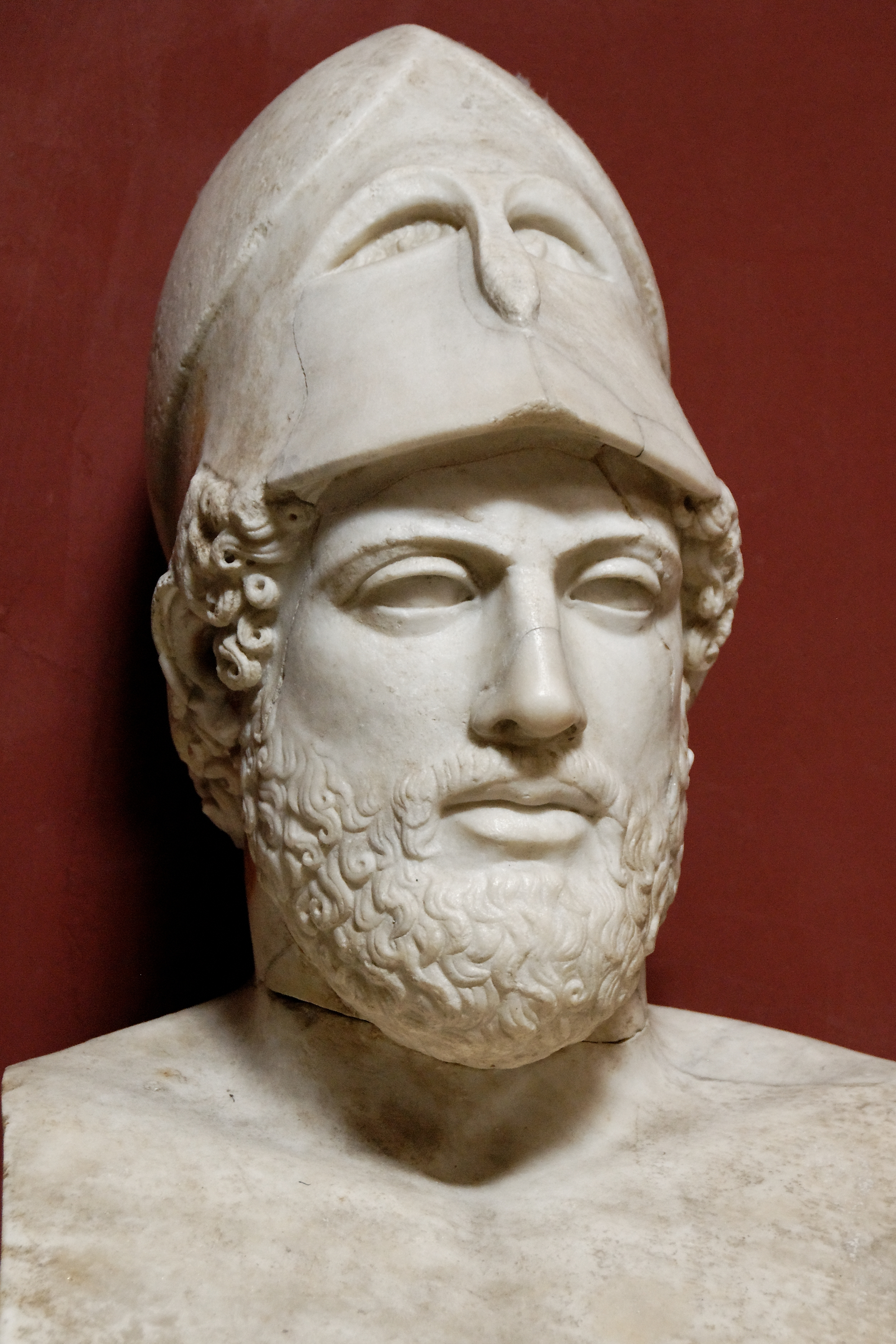
Bust of Pericles with Corinthian helmet, Roman copy after a Greek original from ca. 430 BC

The Corinthian helmet was depicted on more sculptures than any other helmet; it seems the Greeks romantically associated it with glory and the past. The Romans also revered it, from copies of Greek originals to sculpture of their own. Based on the sparse pictorial evidence of the republican Roman army, in Italy the Corinthian helmet evolved into a jockey-cap style helmet called the Italo-Corinthian, Etrusco-Corinthian or Apulo-Corinthian helmet, with the characteristic nose guard and eye slits becoming mere decorations on its face. Given many Roman appropriations of ancient Greek ideas, this change was probably inspired by the "over the forehead" position common in Greek art. This helmet remained in use well into the 1st century AD.

== Literary evidence ==
Herodotus mentions the Corinthian helmet in his Histories when writing of the Machlyes and Auseans, two tribes living along the River Triton in ancient Libya (the portion of ancient Libya he describes is most likely in modern Tunisia). The tribes chose annually two teams of the fairest maidens who fought each other with sticks and stones. They chose the fairest maiden who was dressed in Greek panoply with a Corinthian helmet. The ritual fight was part of a festival honoring the virgin goddess Athena. (Histories, 4.180).

== See also ==
- Pericles with the Corinthian helmet
- Barbute
