= Lyceus =

Full-size statue of Apollo type

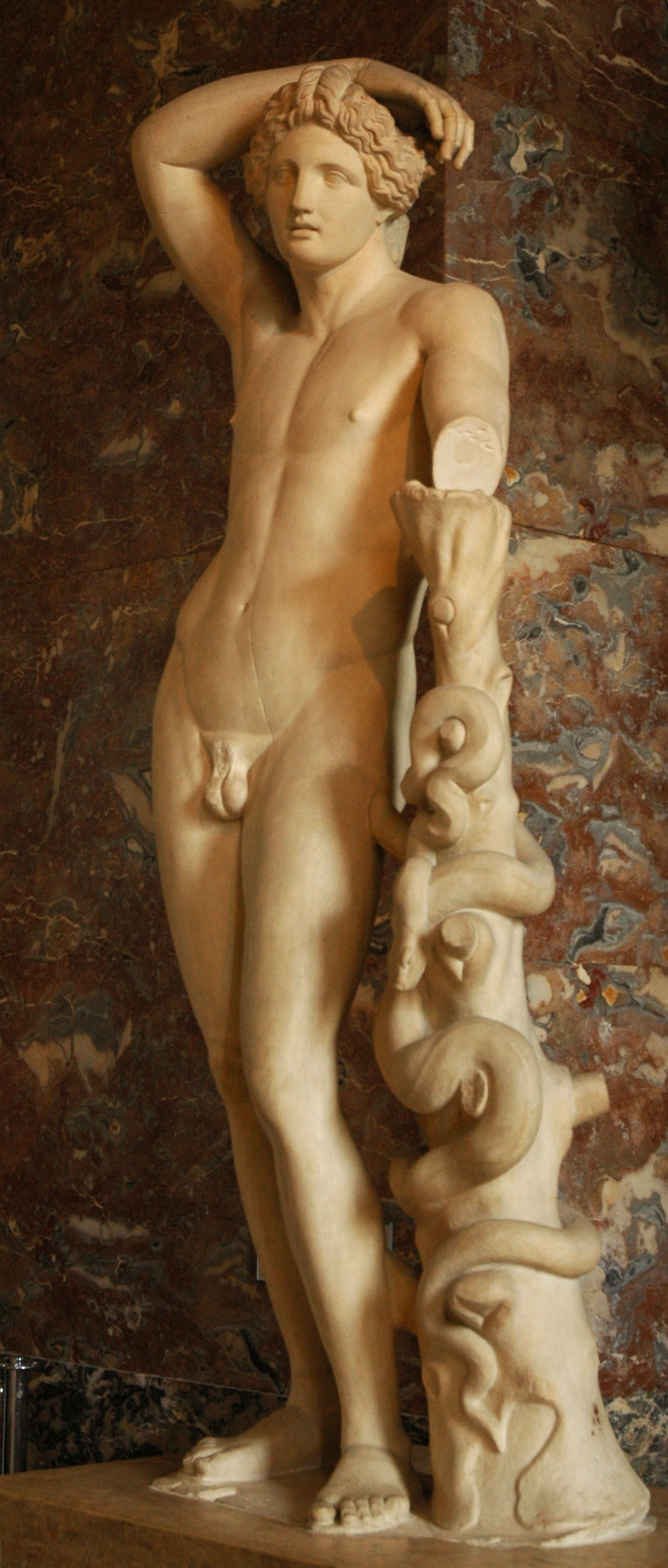
A statue of the Apollo Lykeios type at the Louvre

The Apollo Lyceus (Greek: Ἀπόλλων Λύκειος, Apollōn Lukeios) type, also known as Lycean Apollo, originating with Praxiteles and known from many full-size statue and figurine copies as well as from 1st century BCE Athenian coinage, is a statue type of Apollo showing the god resting on a support (a tree trunk or tripod), his right forearm touching the top of his head and his hair fixed in braids on the top of a head in a haircut typical of childhood. It is called "Lycean" not after Lycia itself, but after its identification with a lost work described, though not attributed to a sculptor, by Lucian as being on show in the Lyceum, one of the gymnasia of Athens. According to Lucian, the god leaning on a support with his bow in his left hand and his right resting on his head is shown "as if resting after long effort." Its main exemplar is the Apollino in Florence or Apollo Medici, in the Uffizi, Florence.

The attribution, based on the type's "elongated proportions, elegant pose and somewhat effeminate anatomy", as Brunilde Sismondo Ridgway characterised it, is traditionally supported on the grounds of the type's similarity to Praxiteles's Hermes from Olympia – one replica of the Lycian Apollo even passed as a copy of the Hermes for a time. The comparison essentially rests on the Apollino, whose head has proportions similar to those of the Aphrodite of Cnidus and whose pronounced sfumato confirms the long-held idea that it is Praxitelean in style, in spite of the many differences among the extant examples.

Nevertheless, most exemplars of this type exhibit a pronounced musculature which does not resemble masculine types normally attributed to Praxiteles – it has further been proposed that it is a work of his contemporary Euphranor, or of a 2nd-century BCE work The Apollino, for its part, would thus be an eclectic creation from the Roman era, mixing several styles from the "second classicism" (i.e. from the 4th century BC).

The famous pose with the arm resting on the head was so thoroughly identified with Apollo that it was used for the Hadrianic sculpture of Antinous as Apollo at Leptis Magna. With the Hellenistic and Roman depictions of a youthful Dionysus typologically not always distinguishable from Apollo, the pose seems to have been inherited by Dionysus, as in the 2nd century CE Ludovisi Dionysus, a Roman sculpture. The pose is also used in the Amazon statue types, and its long-established conventional expression of lassitude identified Sleeping Ariadne as well.

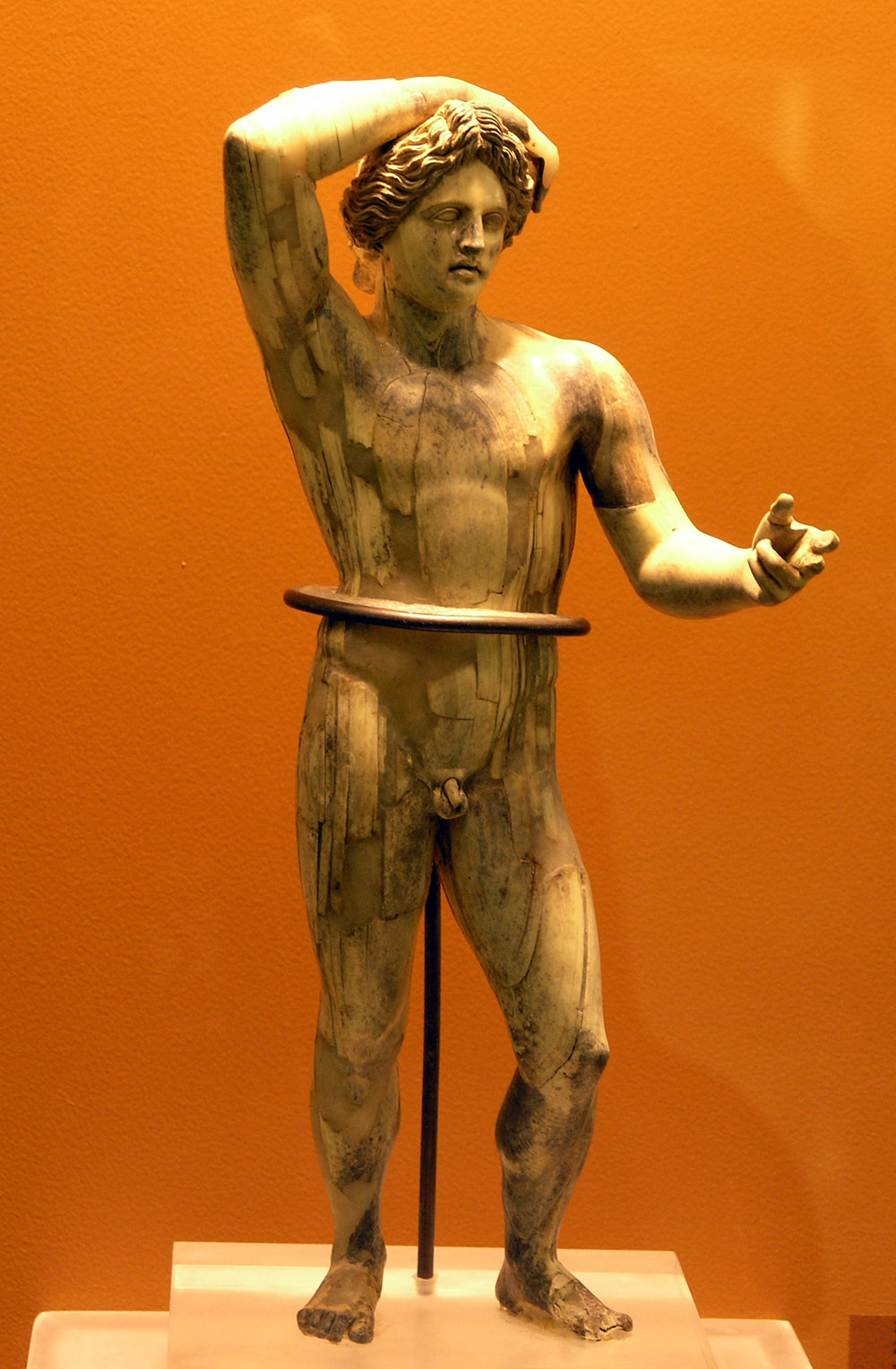
Statuette of the Apollo Lykeios type, Museum of the Ancient Agora of Athens (inv. BI 236)

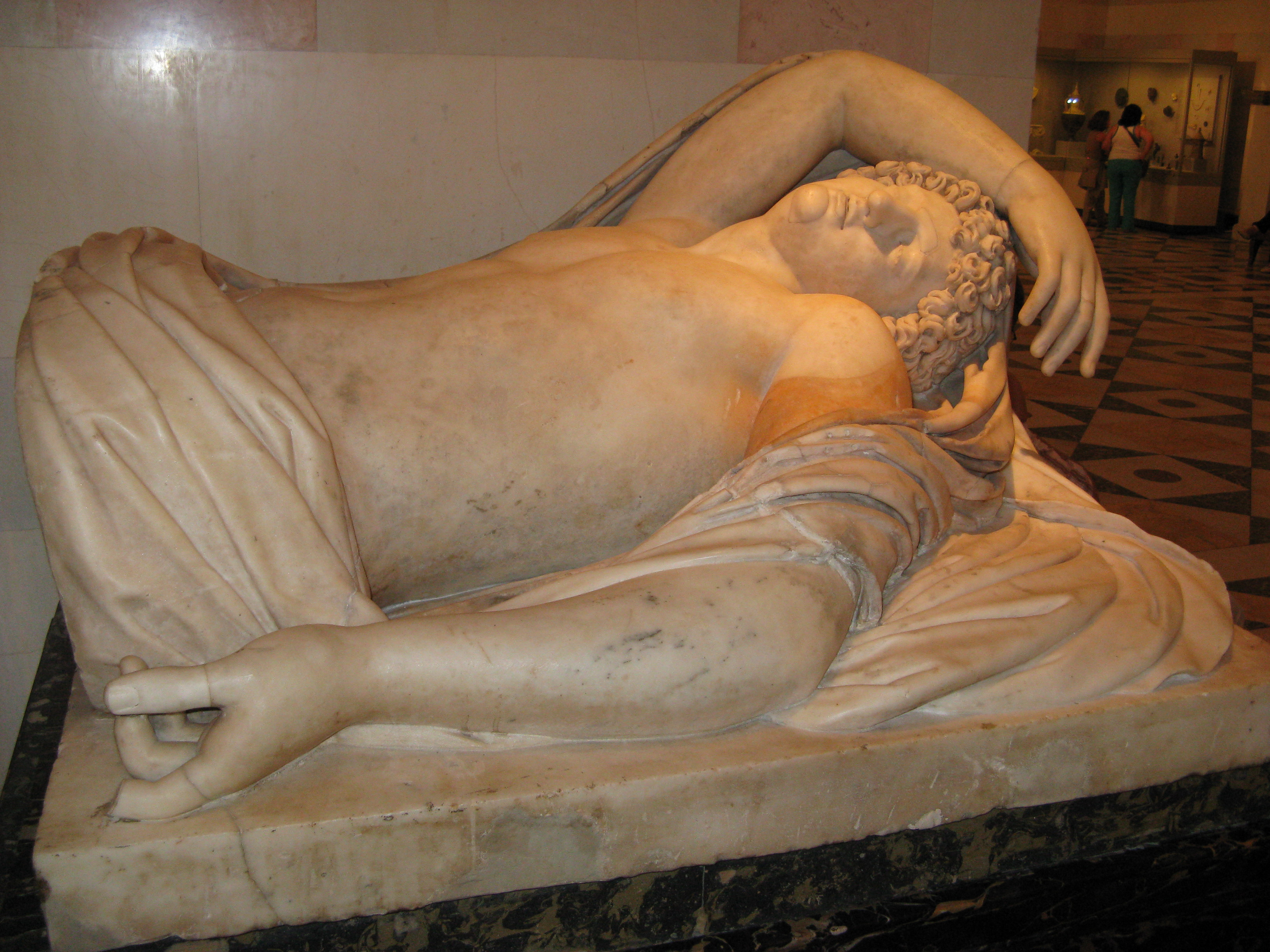
Sleeping Apollo, Roman (Hermitage Museum)
