= Phradmon =

5th-century BC Greek sculptor

Phradmon (Gr. Φράδμων) was a little-known sculptor from Argos, whom Pliny places as the contemporary of Polykleitos, Myron, Pythagoras, Scopas, and Perelius, at Olympiad 90 in 420 BCE, in giving an anecdotal description of a competition for a Wounded Amazon for the temple of Artemis at Ephesus: in Pliny's anecdote, the fifth place was won by Phradmon, whom Pliny admits was younger than any of the four who were preferred to him. Trusting in Pliny's anecdote, scholars have often hopefully assigned the "Lansdowne" type of Wounded Amazon to Phradmon.

Adolf Furtwängler identified the obscure Phradmon as a follower of Polykleitos, but Brunilde Sismondo Ridgway made a case for Phradmon's being a 4th-century BCE sculptor, in which case, for those who are convinced, "the possibility of contemporaneity collapses and with it the entire anecdote of the contest".

Pausanias mentions his statue of the Olympic victor Amertas of Elis, and there is an epigram attributed to Theodoridas of Syracuse, in the Greek Anthology, on a group of twelve bronze cows, made by Phradmon and dedicated to Athena Itonia, that is, Athena as worshiped at Iton in Thessaly, after an Illyrian campaign in 356 or 336 BCE. Phradmon is also mentioned by Columella.

In 1969, three statue bases were discovered at Ostia Antica, one of which had supported a statue of a certain Charite, priestess at Delphi, made by Phradmon of Argos; the inscriptions' form dates them to the 1st century BCE, suggesting that the sculptures had been re-erected on new bases repeating their former inscription.
