= Cesare Lapini =

Italian sculptor

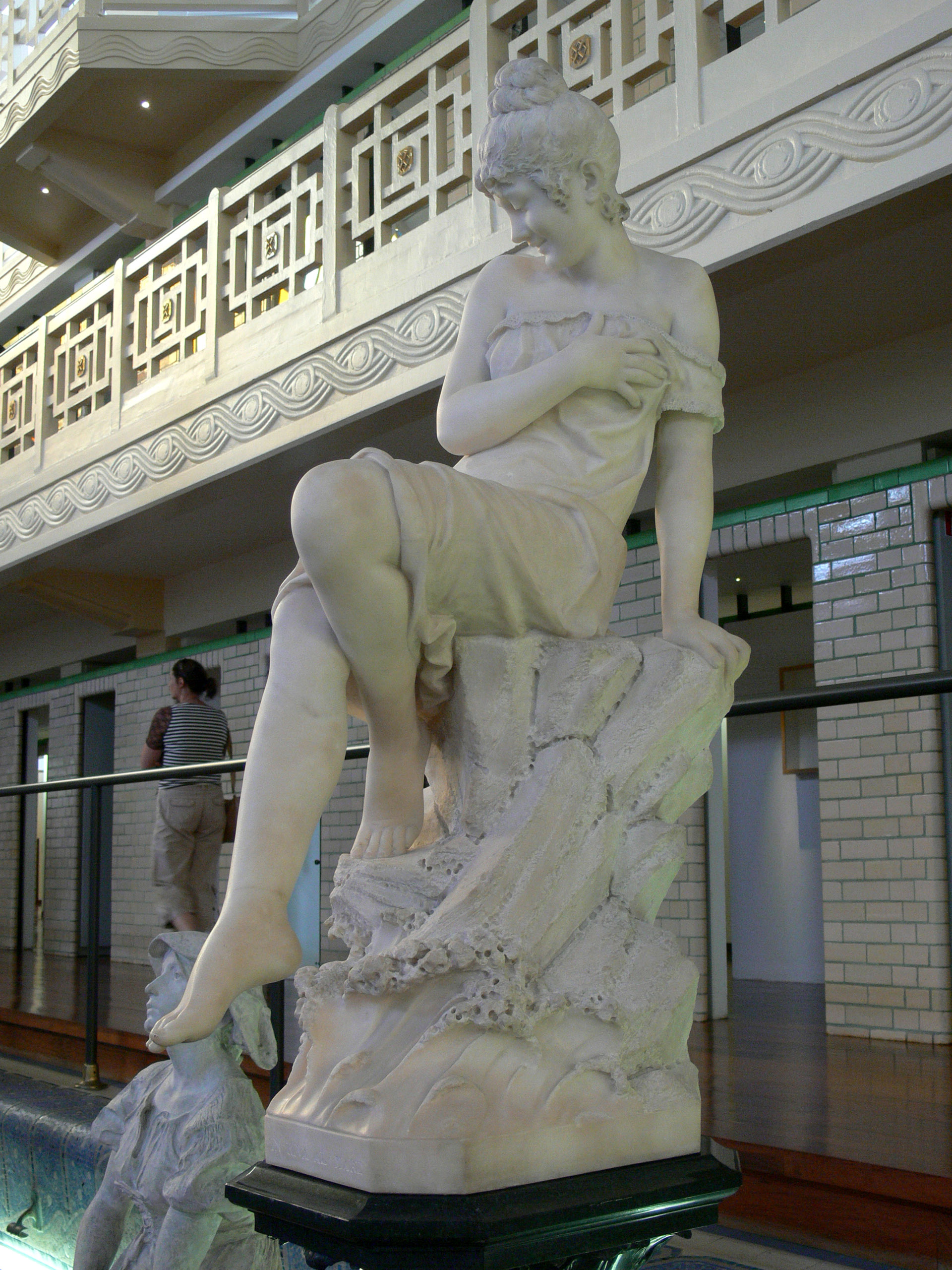
"In riva al' mare"

Cesare Lapini (1848 – after 1890) was an Italian sculptor, mainly active in Florence.

Lapini sculpted both small marbles and larger works. Many of his subjects were female. Among his works is Sorpresa, a young woman surprised while disrobing; Il primo bacio; Quanto ti voglio bene;Non lo credo; Fior del pensiero; La serenata; and Amore del mare.
