= Marguerite Lecomte =

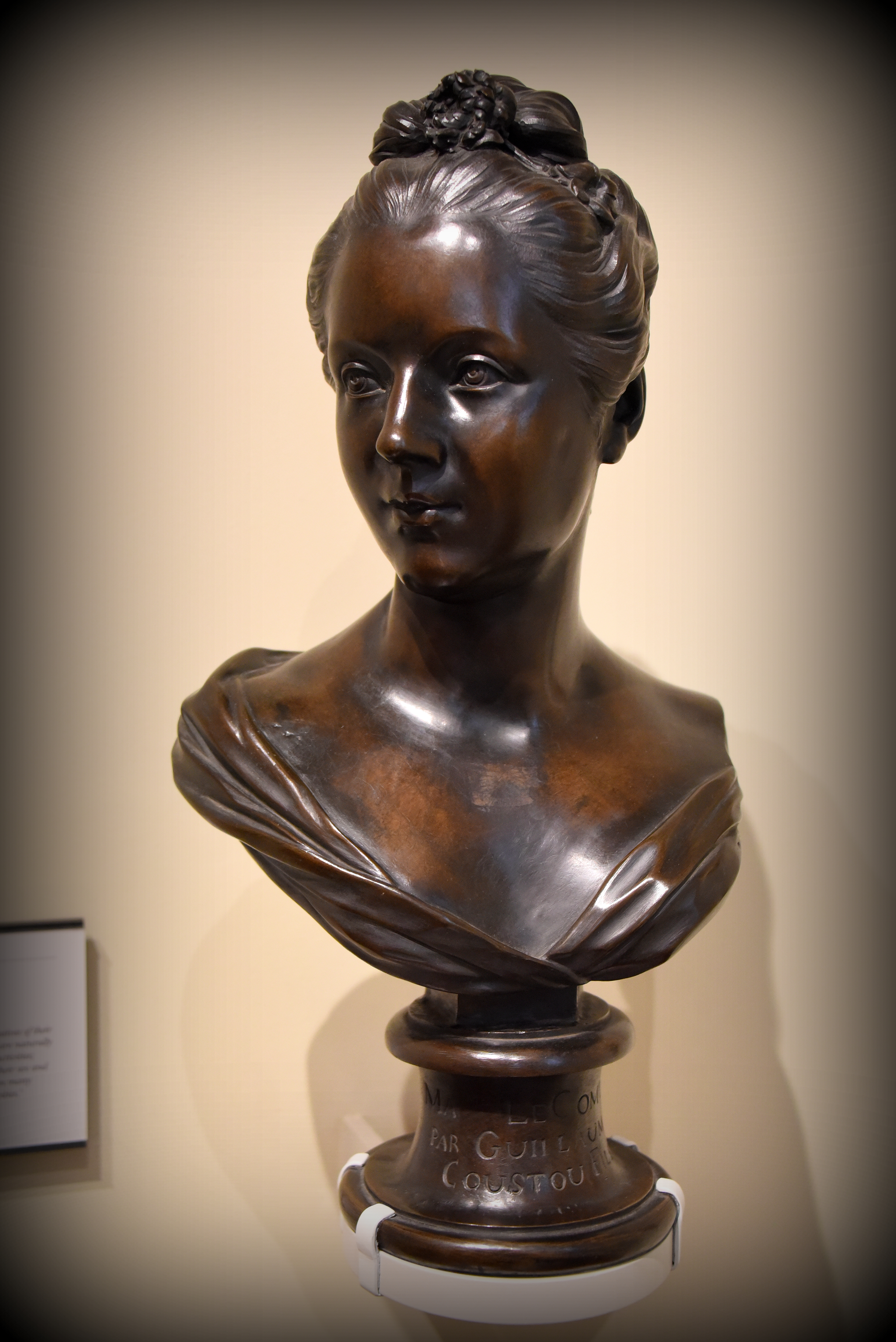
Bronze bust of Marguerite Le Comte, 1750 CE. By Guillaume Coustou the Younger. From Paris, France. The Victoria and Albert Museum, London

Marguerite Lecomte, sometimes Le Comte, née Josset (April 15, 1717 – January 22, 1800) was a French amateur engraver and pastel artist.

== Biography ==
Marguerite Josset, born on 15 April 1717 in Paris, was the daughter of Denis Josset and Marguerite Noiseux, both butchers. She was baptised on 18 April 1717 at Saint-Nicolas-des-Champs (3rd arrondissement).

Although nothing is known about her childhood, at 18 years old, she married Jacques Roger Lecomte, a 33-year-old prosecutor at the Grand Châtelet. Born 27 February 1707 at Sainte-Croix parish, Mantes-la-Jolie, he was the son of Guillaume Lecomte, a drapery merchant, and Catherine Geneviève Boudet. Jacques Roger's mother opposed their marriage and was required to make him a “respectful summons” (an act by which, according to French legislation still in force at the beginning of the twentieth century, a child of legal age up to a certain age required their parents to give their consent to the marriage) in front of the same lawyer, so that she would give her consent.

The couple settled at the home of Jacques Lecomte – Saint-Honoré cloister in Paris (now Rue Saint-Honoré, near the Palais-Royal).

Their son, Louis Victoire, was born 24 December 1739 in Paris, and was baptised at the Church of Saint-Eustache (Paris). Their parents lived on rue des Vieilles-Étuves (now Rue Sauval in the 1st arrondissement).

In February 1746, at a business meeting between Jacques Lecomte and Claude Watelet, poet and member of the French Academy, Watelet met Marguerite Lecomte. Watelet gave aquatint lessons to Marguerite Lecomte, who was a pastel artist and who was the same age as him. They fell in love and began a relationship that lasted 40 years. This seems to have been a peaceful change in their relationship and they formed a ménage à trois with Jacques Lecomte.

== Marguerite Lecomte and the Moulin-Joly ==
The trio moved to the Moulin-Joly in Colombes. The Lecomtes had bought the property on 11 August 1750 through Antoine Quinquet, a Parisian lawyer, but it was Claude Watelet who paid for the purchase and the major repairs.

Very shortly, an entourage of artists settled at Moulin-Joly, soon followed by a crowd of uninvited people.

== The journey to Italy ==
Marguerite accompanied Claude Watelet on his journey to Italy from 1763-1764 while Jacques Lecomte, who was still a prosecutor at the Grand Chatelet, stayed in Paris. They left in September 1763, along with Father Francois Copette, a friend and Watelet's former private tutor.

In Italy, Marguerite began a friendship with Princess Borghese (née Agnese Colonna, 1702-1780) and Cardinal Alexandre Albani (1692-1779). In 1764, she did a portrait of the latter. She was appointed member of the Academies of Rome, Florence, Parma and Bologna. According to Watelet, she had “the fortunate talent of pleasing without having to think about it/A good heart, a sense of right and the gift of being a friend/An honest and free spirit embellishing those traits/Finally, the grace to united reason/Le Comte, it is for you that nature has made/And that art cannot render, in engraving your portrait.” Some claimed, however, that she had been accepted to these academies thanks only to Watelet's works which she had simply signed.

The journey was described by Louis Subleyras in his “Nella venuta in Roma di madama Le Comte e dei signori Watelet e Copette”. This work notably included illustrations by Hubert Robert and Franz Edmund Weirotter who were residents at the Moulin-Joly. The latter most notably engraved "Mme Le Comte et M. Watelet admirent l'Apollon du Vatican" et "Mme Le Comte et M. Watelet arrivent à Rome accompagnés de Minerve, du Temps et de l'Amour". Hubert Robert gave a series of twelve pieces to Marguerite Lecomte: “Les Soirées de Rome” (1763-1764) which combined a pleasant composition with a picturesque execution.

== The butterflies ==
On her return from Italy in 1765, Marguerite Lecomte printed “Suite de papillons”, a series of 25 butterflies on 12 boards. She then painted them with pastel before offering them to her friends.

On 20 June 2006, a complete copy of her work (17 cm x 22 cm), bound in calf skin, with a decorated golden spine and a red cover, was sold for 10 000 €. Apart from this, there is only one other known copy, which resides in the Bibliothèque nationale. Watelet was given an apartment at the Louvre by the King, where the trio moved in. They still kept the Moulin-Joly as a country residence where they hosted Louis XVI and Marie Antoinette in 1774.

== The end of a great love ==
On 20 July 1785, Watelet offered Marguerite a superb manuscript collection of 50 fables, composed by himself and written by Fyot le Jeune, a well-known calligrapher of the period. This was to be is last gift. After 40 years of living together, Claude Watelet died on January 12, 1786, at the Louvre, at 11pm, in the pavilion of the colonnade, at the left of the courtyard. Shortly after, Jacques and Marguerite sold the Moulin-Joly.

Jacques Roger died on January 2, 1789, at the Louvre.

Marguerite died on January 22, 1800, in Paris, rue Neuve Saint-Paul (now Rue Charles V, in the 4th arrondissement).

Upon Watelet's death her husband requested the return of a number of portraits of his wife, including a marble bust, an oil painting, and two pastels. Some sources have claimed that she herself was a pastel artists, but others discount this. Lecomte died in Paris.
