= Apollino =

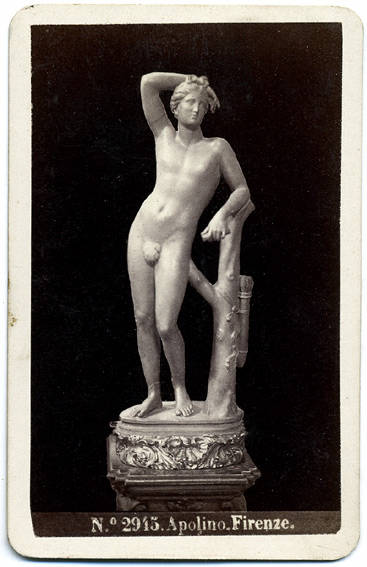
The Apollino

The Apollino or Medici Apollo is a Roman copy of a Hellenistic sculpture of the adolescent god Apollo of the Apollo Lykeios type. It is now in the Uffizi, Florence.

Its head has proportions similar to those of Praxiteles's Aphrodite of Cnidus, and thus it has been argued to be a copy of a Praxitelean original, or at least to be Praxitelean in style. Others argue it is an eclectic creation from the Roman era, mixing several styles from the "second classicism". Its left arm may have held a bow.

Found complete in Rome in the 17th century, though its exact early provenance is obscure, it was originally in the Borghese collection, until it was moved to the Medici collection at Villa Medici, where it was recorded in 1704. Unlike many ancient sculptures in the Medici collection, it was not moved to Florence by Cosimo III de' Medici, remaining in Rome until it was removed to accompany the Medici Niobe Group in 1769–70. Though it has since declined in reputation, it retained its praise through the 18th century, as one of the most copied Roman sculptures. It was seen in the Tribuna of the Uffizi by the English poet Percy Bysshe Shelley, who commented:

It is difficult to conceive anything more delicately beautiful than the Ganymede; but the spirit-like lightness, the softness, the flowing perfection of [the Apollino's] forms, surpass it. The countenance, though exquisitely lovely and gentle, is not divine. There is a womanish vivacity of winning yet passive happiness, and yet a boyish inexperience exceedingly delightful. Through the limbs there seems to flow a spirit of life which gives them lightness. Nothing can be more perfectly lovely than the legs, and the union of the feet with the ankles, and the fading away of the lines of the feet to the delicate extremities. It is like a spirit even in dreams. The neck is long yet full, and sustains the head with its profuse and knotted hair as if it needed no sustaining.

In 1840 at the Uffizi it was broken by a painting falling on it and was restored by Lorenzo Bartolini, who covered the whole statue with a layer of paint to disguise the repairs.

In addition to many 17th and 18th century copies, the French sculptor Jean-Baptiste Vietty made a copy of the Apollino that is conserved in the Musée des Beaux-Arts of Lyon.

There is also an "Apollino Milani" in Florence's National Archaeological Museum and one carved by Niccolò Bazzanti of the Pietro Bazzanti e Figlio Art Gallery of Florence at Museo Civico Revoltella, Trieste.

== Bibliography and external links ==
- JSTOR: That 'Most Rare Master Monsii Le Gros' and His 'Marsyas'
- JSTOR: Greek Sculpture and Roman Copies I: Anton Raphael Mengs and the Eighteenth Century
- Cast
