= Joseph Victor Audoy =

Joseph-Victor Audoÿ
- Born: 9 May 1782 in Lavaur (Tarn); Kingdom of France
- Died: 25 November 1871 (aged 89) in Saint-Lieux-lès-Lavaur (Tarn); France
- Branch: Military engineering
- Rank: Brigadier General
- Commands: Morea expedition (1828)
- Conflicts: Napoleonic Wars
- Awards: Knight of the Order of Saint-Louis; Commander of the Legion of Honour; Commander of the Order of the Redeemer (Greece)
- Other work: General Councilor (Tarn); President of the General Council (Tarn)

Joseph-Victor Audoÿ was a French General, military engineering officer and politician. He was born on 9 May 1782 in Lavaur (Tarn) and died on 25 November 1871 in Saint-Lieux-lès-Lavaur (Tarn).

== Biography ==
Joseph-Victor Audoÿ was the son of Pierre Séverin Audoÿ (first Mayor of the city of Lavaur during the French revolution between 1789 and 1792 and member of the National Legislative Assembly between the 28 June 1791 and July 1792) and of Marie Henriette Lucile Pétronille de Clausade de Riols de Mazieu.He was born on 9 May 1782 in Lavaur in the department of Tarn. He was the second child in a family of four children.

He studied at the École Polytechnique de Paris (he was the first polytechnician coming from Tarn), and left it in 1804 to join military engineering.

=== Napoleonic Wars ===
Audoy became aide-de-camp to Lieutenant-General Joseph, Viscount of Rogniat. He thus served in the army of Spain from 1810 to 1812. Promoted Captain to the corps of military engineers of the army of Aragon, he participated in the sieges of Lérida, of Tortosa, of Tarragona and of Valencia and was made a Knight of the Legion of Honor on 6 August 1810.

After his return from the campaign of Russia (1812), he was promoted to Chef de Bataillon and chief engineer in the corps of military engineers. Audoy campaigned in Saxony (1813) where he fortified Dresden, then participated in January 1814 in the defense of Metz. On 9 November 1814, he was elevated to the rank of Officer of the Legion of Honor. On 18 June 1815, he participated in the Battle of Waterloo, where he was wounded.

=== Under the Restoration ===
After Napoleon's second abdication, Joseph-Victor Audoÿ rallied to Louis XVIII, who appointed him by royal letter on 18 August 1819 Knight of the Royal and Military Order of Saint-Louis.

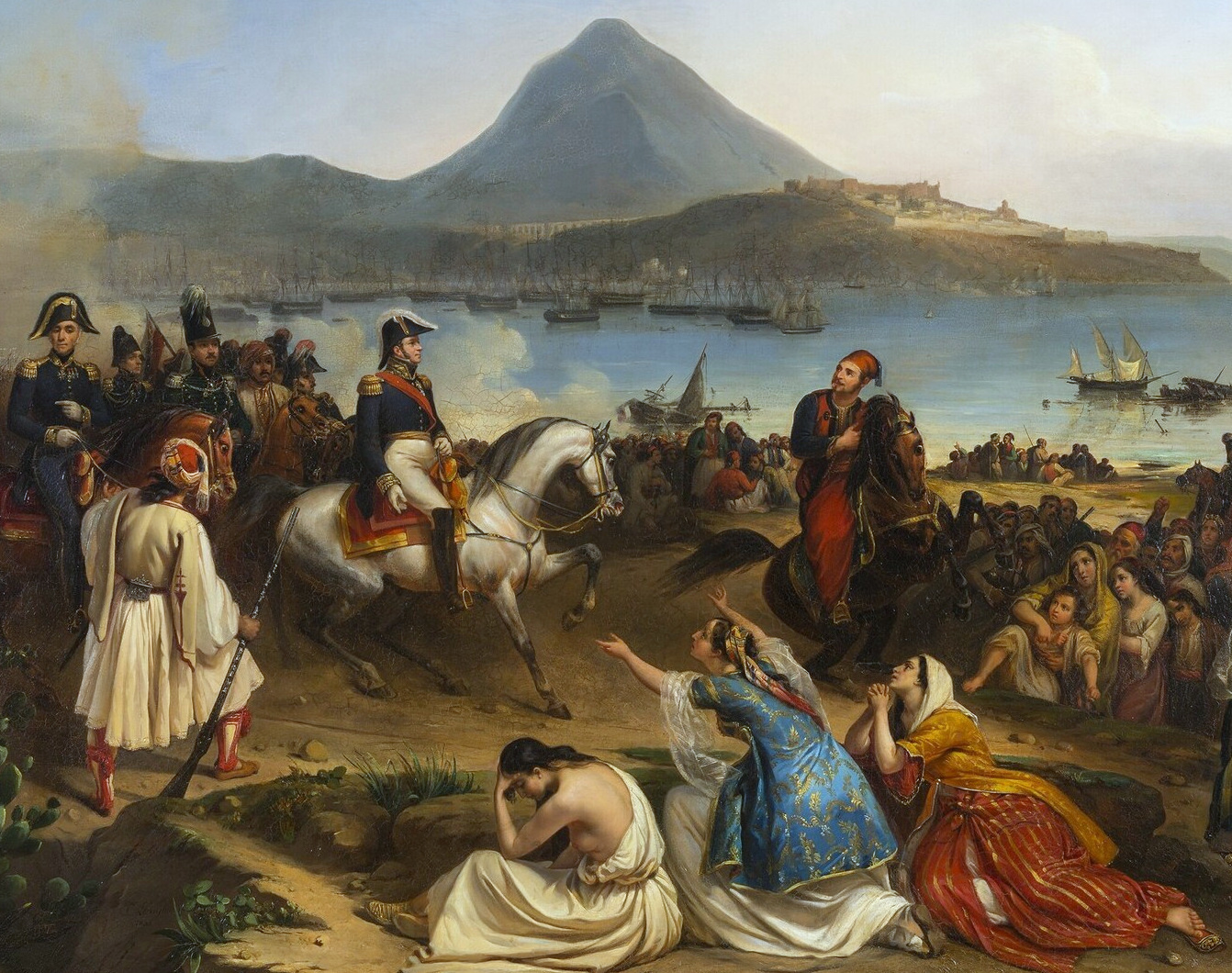
The French Morea Expedition in 1828 (by Jean-Charles Langlois)

By the ordinance of 24 July 1828, he was then sent to Greece as a lieutenant-colonel and commander of the engineers, to participate in the Morea expedition, under the command of Marshal Maison, during the Greek War of Independence. Audoy liberated at the head of his sappers, the cities of Navarino, Modon (Methoni) and Coron (Koroni) in Peloponnese in October 1828, then took the "Morea castle" of Patras (on 30 October 1828) to the Turkish-Egyptian occupation troops of Ibrahim Pasha. During this campaign, on 22 February 1829 at Navarino, king Charles X of France made him Commander of the Legion of Honor.

Following an agreement between Marshal Maison and the Governor of the new independent Greek state Ioannis Kapodistrias, the commander of the engineer troops Audoy was charged with several works of rehabilitation of the country which had been heavily ransacked by the Egyptian troops. He raised back the fortifications of the fortresses of Navarino and Modon and built barracks for the French troops (that of Navarino is still in use today and houses the new Archaeological Museum of Pylos). He built bridges, as on the Pamissos river between Navarino and Kalamata. The road between Navarino and Modon, the first in independent Greece, was also built. Finally, many improvements were made by the French engineering regiments to the cities of the Peloponnese (schools, post offices, printing houses, bridges, squares, fountains, gardens, etc.). Audoy was charged in particular by the governor of Greece to establish the first urban plans of the modern history of the country. He thus built from October 1828 the new cities of Modon (current Methoni) and Navarino (current Pylos), outside the walls of the fortresses, on the model of the bastides of Southwest France (Audoy originated from Tarn) and the cities of the Ionian Islands (which share common features, such as a central geometrical square bordered by covered galleries built with a succession of contiguous arches, each supported by a colonnade, as the arcades of Pylos or Corfu). He also had the famous Capodistrian school of Methoni built between December 1829 and February 1830. All these cities quickly repopulated and returned to their pre-war activity. On his return to France, the newly installed king Otto I of Greece conferred by royal decree on Audoy the title of Commander of the Royal Order of the Redeemer, on 30 July 1835.

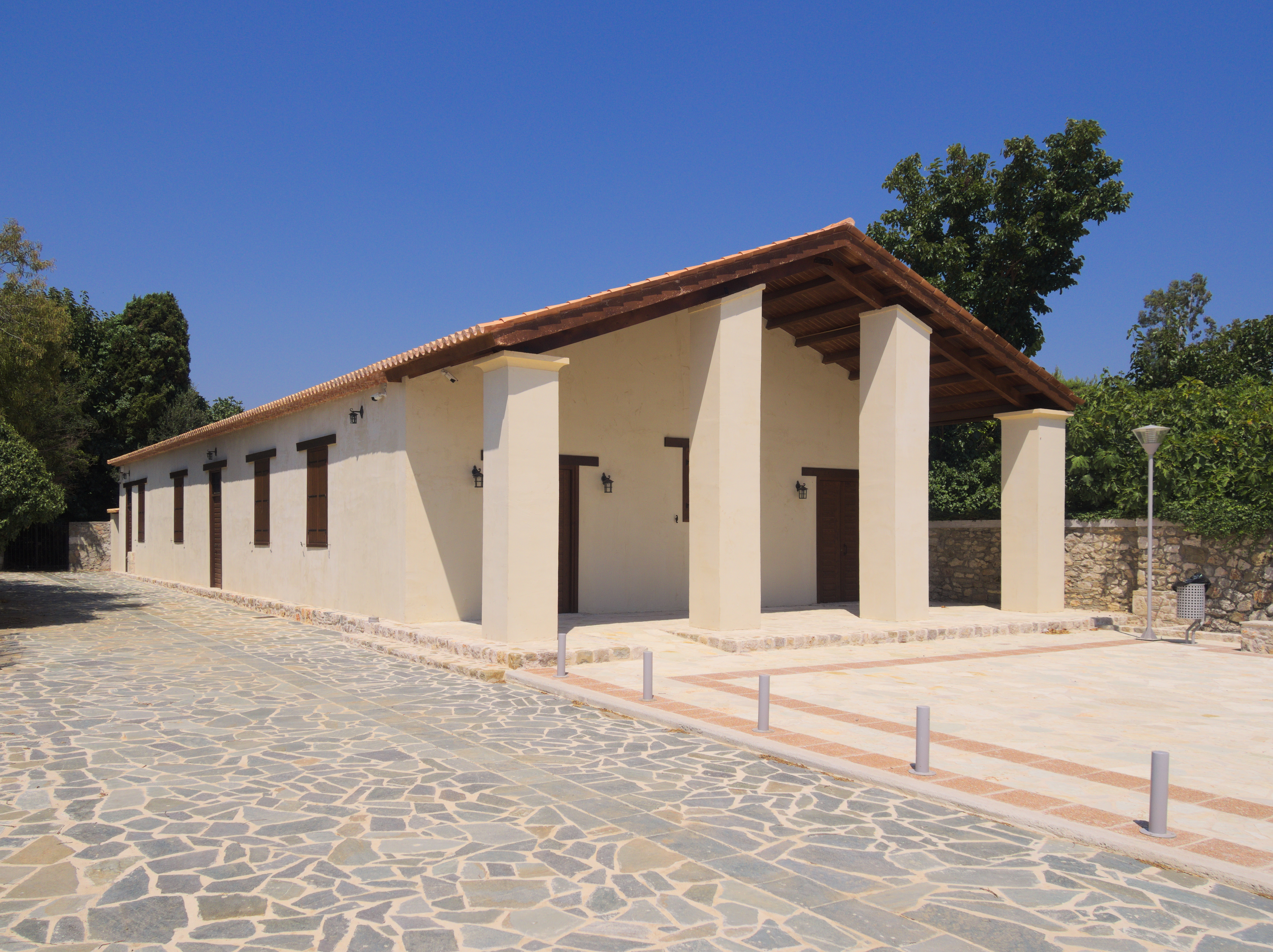
The Capodistrian School of Methoni, built in February 1830 on plans drawn up by the Commander of Engineering, Lieutenant-Colonel Joseph-Victor Audoy

Subsequently, appointed Colonel, he commanded between 1833 and 1838 the 1st engineer regiment in Metz. He was then promoted to brigadier general (Général de brigade) and inspector-general of the engineering in 1838, and then became director of the fortifications of Amiens and then of Lille.

Audoy also taught at the Artillery and Engineering Application School (École d'application de l'artillerie et du génie) in Metz.

=== Representative activities ===
Joseph-Victor Audoÿ was elected General Councilor of the department of Tarn on 29 November 1845 (with 141 votes out of 237 voters), then he was re-elected during the French Second Republic on 27 August 1848 (with 1812 votes out of 1867 voters). Subsequently, he became President of the General Council of Tarn between 1849 and 1852, succeeding Marshal Soult.

Retired to Saint-Lieux-lès-Lavaur in the familial Château des Cambards after his final retirement from public life, he died there on 25 November 1871 at the age of 89. He was buried in the municipal cemetery. His grave was rehabilitated by the National Association of French Souvenir in 2013.

== Decorations ==
- Knight of the Royal and Military Order of Saint-Louis on 18 August 1819.
- Knight of the Legion of Honor on 6 August 1810
- Officer of the Legion of Honor on 9 November 1814.
- Commander of the Legion of Honor on 22 February 1829.
- Commander of the Royal Order of the Redeemer (Greece), on 30 July 1835.

== Annexes ==
=== Bibliography ===
- Almanach royal pour les années 1814/15 (Gallica - BnF), p. 475, éditions Testu et Cie, Paris. (in French)
- Nicolas Joseph Maison (Lieutenant-general) : dépêches adressées au ministre de la Guerre Louis-Victor de Caux, vicomte de Blacquetot, octobre 1828, in Jacques Mangeart, Supplemental Chapter of the Souvenirs de la Morée: recueillis pendant le séjour des Français dans le Peloponèse, Igonette, Paris, 1830. (in French)
- Pigi P. Kalogerakou (Πηγή Π. Καλογεράκου), The contribution of the French expeditionary force to the restoration of the fortresses and the cities of Messinia (Η συμβολή του Γαλλικού εκστρατευτικού σώματος στην αποκατάσταση των φρουρίων και των πόλεων της Μεσσηνίας), in Οι πολιτικοστρατιωτικές σχέσεις Ελλάδας - Γαλλίας (19ος - 20ός αι.), Directorate of the History of the Army, (Διεύθυνση Ιστορίας Στρατού), 13–41, Athens, 2011. (in Greek)
- Antonis K. Tisrigos (Αντώνης Κ. Τσιρίγος), Capodistrian school of Methoni (Το καποδιστριακό Σχολείο της Μεθώνης, 1829-2016), preface by Professor Petros Themelis, Private Edition, Athens, 2017. (in Greek)
- Anastasie Tsagkaraki, Les philhellènes français dans la lutte pour l’indépendance grecque (1821-1831), Revue Historique des Armées, 2nd trimester 2016. (in French)
- Jacques Louis Lacour, Excursions en Grèce pendant l'occupation de la Morée par l'armée française en 1832-33, Arthur Bertrand, Paris, 1834. (in French)
- Les conseillers généraux du Tarn (the General Councilors of Tarn), Archives of the Tarn department, 8 September 2015. (in French)
- Historique du Château des Cambards , on the webpage of the Château des Cambards. (in French)
- Le Souvenir Français à Saint-Sulpice, La Dépêche du Midi, 27 October 2013. (article in French)

=== External links ===
- Resources related to his public life: Base Léonore : "Notice no. LH/72/63". Base Léonore (in French). (Ordre national de la Légion d'honneur)
- Service historique de l'armée de terre – Fort de Vincennes : Dossier S.H.A.T. Côte : 8 YD 2982.

=== Linked articles ===
- Morea expedition
- List of members of the Morea expedition (1828-1833)
