= Antoine Simon Durrieu =

French politician and officer

Baron Antoine Simon Durrieu
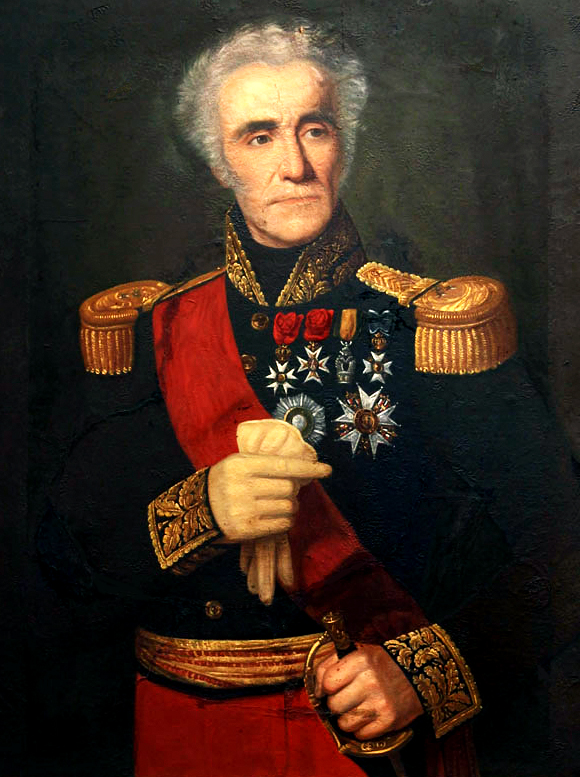
- Born: 20 July 1775 in Grenade-sur-l'Adour (Landes); Kingdom of France
- Died: 7 April 1862 (aged 86) in Saint-Sever (Landes); France
- Service years: 1793–1848
- Rank: General of division (1829)
- Commands: Spain expedition (1823); Morea expedition (1828)
- Conflicts: French Revolutionary Wars; Napoleonic Wars
- Awards: Baron; Name engraved under the Arc de Triomphe; Knight of the Order of Saint-Louis; Grand-croix of the Legion of Honour; Grand-croix of the Order of Isabella the Catholic; Grand-croix of the Order of the Redeemer; Knight of the Order of the Iron Crown
- Other work: Deputy (district of Landes): Chamber of the July Monarchy (1834–1845); Chamber of Peers (1845–1848); National Legislative Assembly (1851)

Antoine Simon Durrieu was a French general and politician. He was born on 20 July 1775 in Grenade-sur-l'Adour (Landes) and died on 7 April 1862 in Saint-Sever (Landes).

== Life ==
=== Revolutionary Wars and Napoleonic Wars ===
Son of a notary, he studied at the seminary of Aire-sur-l'Adour and left it in 1793 to go, with the corps of the National Guards of Bayonne, to the banks of the Bidasoa to keep the positions that the troop of line could not occupy at the borders. In 1795, he became Captain of the Basque volunteers. That same year, he joined the Army of the Eastern Pyrenees. Following the peace concluded with Spain, he crossed into Italy and fought in Tyrol with Generals Joubert and Belliard. After Malta, he also distinguished himself at the Battle of the Pyramids (21 July 1798) in the French Army of the Orient commanded by General Bonaparte.

After his return to France for health reasons, he courageously fought in the battles of Engen, Messkirch, Biberach, Marengo and Pozzolo. He nevertheless remained Captain for fourteen years. Having been wounded in Calabria under the orders of General Masséna, he was finally appointed Battalion Commander in 1807, and eighteen months later, Colonel on the battlefield of Wagram (5–6 July 1809). On 9 May 1811, Napoleon made him Knight of the Empire. During the campaign of Russia in 1812, he became chief of the general staff of Prince Eugène de Beauharnais, who noticed his conduct at the Battle of Borodino on 7 September.

The defense of Glogau was entrusted to him. He took part in the battles of Lützen and Bautzen (1813). Became Brigadier General on 3 June 1813, he locked himself up with a strong detachment in Torgau on the Elbe, where an epidemic fever consumed 25,000 men. Attacked by the Prussians, he resisted them but was taken prisoner in 1814. He was released after the fall of the Empire.

Back in France, during the invasion of 1815, he was division's head at the Ministry of War. The return of Napoleon during the Hundred-Days having called him back to activity, he took part in the fights at the battle of Ligny (Fleurus) and was wounded at the battle of Waterloo on 18 June 1815.

Napoleon Bonaparte had said of Durrieu: "If all those who were responsible for defending the soil of France had resembled Durrieu, the soil would never have been insulted by being trampled on by the foreigner."

=== Expeditions in the Mediterranean ===
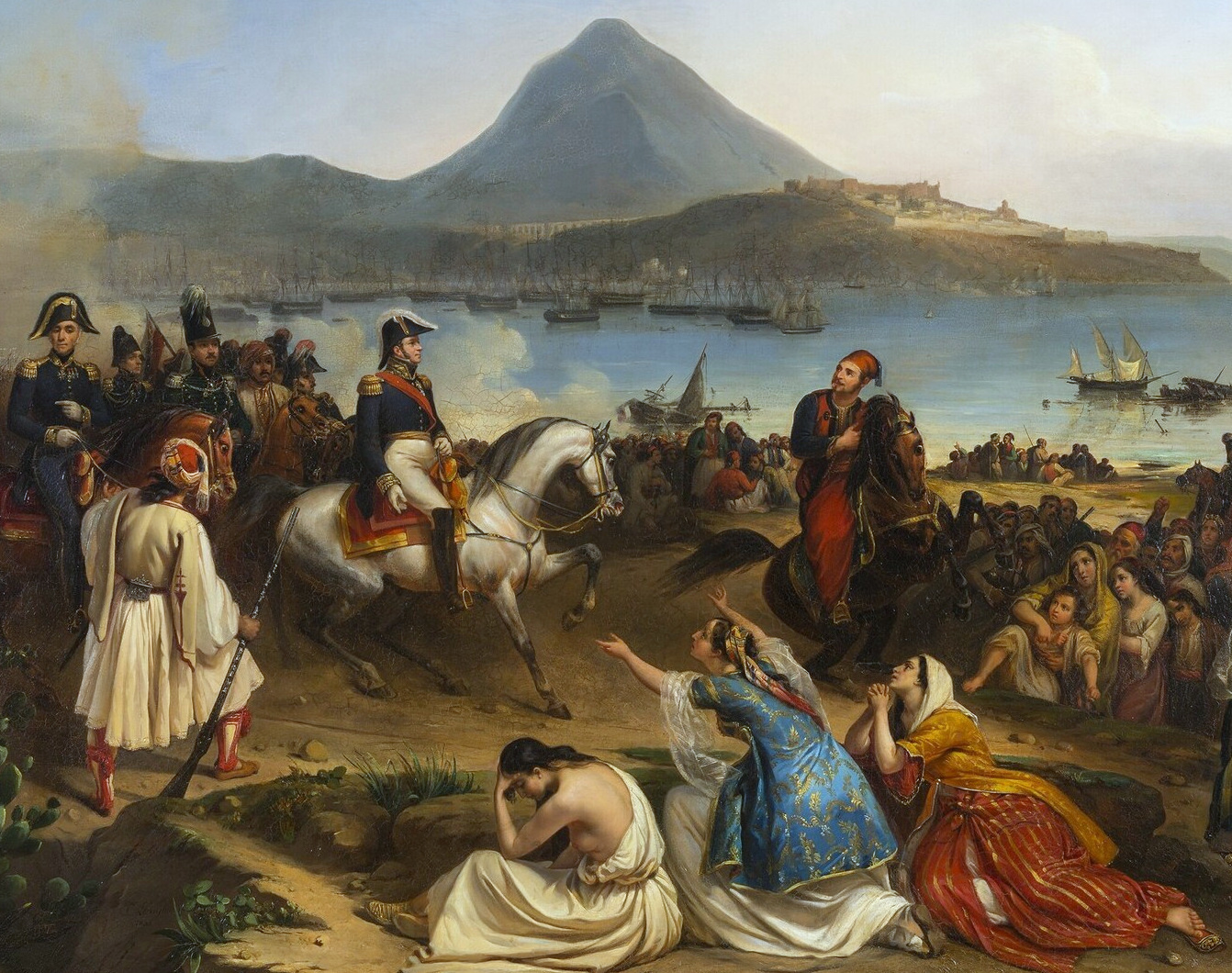
The French Morea expedition in 1828 (by Jean-Charles Langlois)

Rallied to the Restoration, he was appointed in 1818, one of the sixteen Field Marshals of the royal staff. He participated as Chief of the General Staff in the Spain expedition (1823), then in the Morea expedition (1828) during the Greek War of Independence.

In Greece, in the Peloponnese, he liberated the city of Modon (7 October 1828) and took the “castle of Morea” in Patras (30 October 1828) from the Turkish-Egyptian occupation troops of Ibrahim Pasha. Marshal Maison, under the command of whom he served, and himself, left the Greek soil after 8 months of mission, on 22 May 1829, after having completely liberated Greece from the occupier. During this campaign, on 22 February 1829, he was promoted by King Charles X, General of division, then on his return to France, Baron on 30 June 1830.

=== Parliamentary activities ===
Under the July Monarchy, entrusted with the command of the division of Ajaccio, Durrieu received the title of General Inspector of Infantry in 1833. Candidate of the government, he was elected deputy of the Landes (district of Saint-Sever) in the Chamber of Deputies for five successive terms (from 1834 to 1845, 2nd–6th legislature). Appointed Pair of France by King Louis-Philippe on 14 August 1845, he also sat in the Chamber of Peers between 1845 and 1848.

During the Revolution of 1848, he was placed on retirement as a General of division on 30 May 1848, after 54 years of service in the French Army. On 11 May 1851 he was recalled by the voters of the Landes to replace the economist Frédéric Bastiat at the Assembly, and was elected as a Representative of the People at the National Legislative Assembly of the Second Republic for one term.

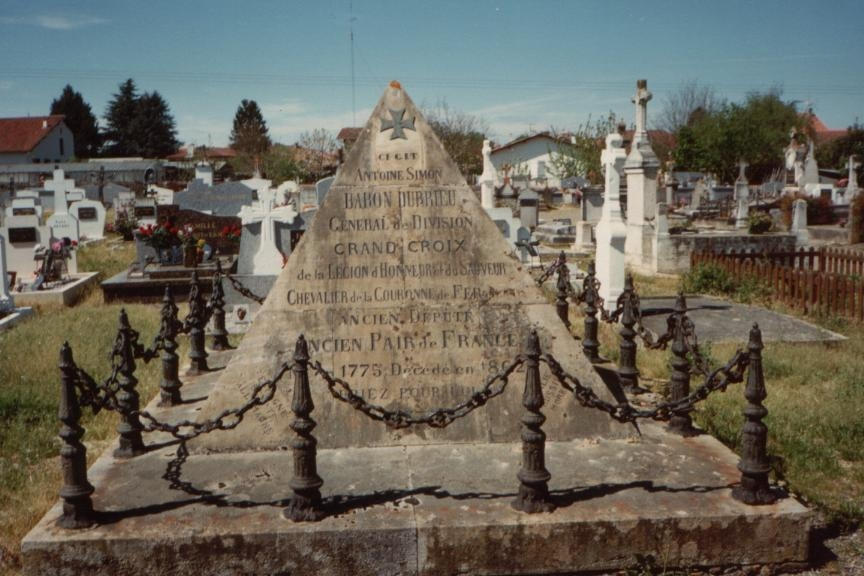
Tomb of Antoine Simon Durrieu, in the cemetery of Saint-Sever (Landes)

He retired to Saint-Sever for a definitive retirement, and died there on 7 April 1862. His tomb in the municipal cemetery is surmounted by an Egyptian pyramid, probably in memory of the memorable Napoleonic campaign of 1798.

== Decorations, military ranks and representative positions ==
- Name engraved under the Arc de Triomphe (Eastern pillar, Column 19)
- 1st Baron Durrieu on 30 June 1830.
- Pair of France on 14 August 1845.
- Deputy of the district of the Landes (1834–1851)
- French decorations:
  - Knight of the Order of Saint-Louis.
  - Knight of the Legion of Honour on 13 February 1809.
  - Officier of the Legion of Honour on 24 August 1814.
  - Commander of the Legion of Honour on 29 October 1828.
  - Grand-officier of the Legion of Honour on 5 January 1834.
  - Grand-croix of the Legion of Honour on 24 October 1859.
- Foreign decorations:
  - Knight of the Order of the Iron Crown. (Kingdom of Italy)
  - Grand-croix of the Order of Isabella the Catholic (Spain) in 1823.
  - Grand-croix of the Order of the Redeemer (Greece)

Successive military ranks:

- Captain (1793)
- Battalion Commander (Chef de bataillon) (1807)
- Colonel (1809)
- Brigadier General (Général de brigade) (1813)
- Field Marshal (Maréchal de camp) (1818)
- Divisional general (Général de division) (22 February 1829).

== Annexes ==
=== Bibliography ===
- "Antoine Simon Durrieu", in Charles Mullié, Biographie des célébrités militaires des armées de terre et de mer de 1789 à 1850, 1852.
- "Antoine Simon Durrieu", in Adolphe Robert and Gaston Cougny, Dictionnaire des parlementaires français (1789–1891), Bourloton, Paris, 1889 Edition details Wikisource
- Boesch, Philippe (2010). Antoine Simon Durrieu : Général d'Empire, député orléaniste. Biarritz: Atlantica. p. 192. ISBN 978-2-7588-0316-4.
- Renaut, Jean-François (5 January 2011). "Antoine-Simon Durrieu, le général oublié (the forgotten General)". www.sudouest.fr. Sud-Ouest.
- Antoine Simon Durrieu's personal papers are kept at the National Archives under the reference 229AP

=== External links ===
- Resources related to his public life: Base Léonore; Base Sycomore :
  - "Notice no. LH/875/52". Base Léonore (in French). (National Order of the Legion of Honour)
  - "List of the parliamentary terms of Antoine, Simon Durrieu (1775–1862)". Base Sycomore. (French National Assembly)
- Defence Historical Service – Fort de Vincennes :
  - File S.H.A.T. Reference : 7 Yd 1 091.
  - Reference S.H.A.T., state of services, distinctions.
- "roglo.eu". Simon Durrieu.
- "gw1.geneanet.org". Antoine Simon Durrieu.

=== Linked articles ===
- Morea expedition
- List of members of the Morea expedition (1828–1833)
