= Philippe Higonet =

French general and politician (1782–1859)

Baron Philippe Higonet
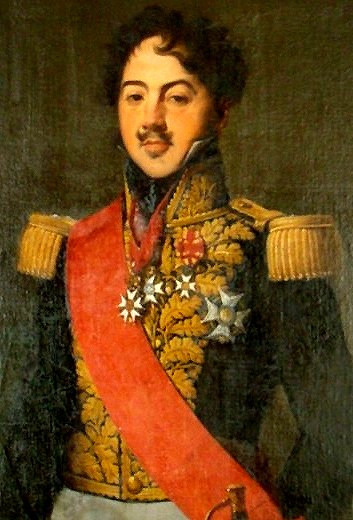
- Higonet c. 1830
- Born: 5 May 1782 in Saint-Geniez-d'Olt (Aveyron); Kingdom of France
- Died: 12 February 1859 (aged 76) in Aurillac (Cantal); France
- Military career
- Rank: Brigadier General
- Commands: Spain expedition (1823); Morea expedition (1828)
- Conflicts: Napoleonic Wars
- Awards: Baron; Commander of the Order of Saint-Louis; Commander of the Legion of Honour; Commander of the Order of the Redeemer (Greece); Grand officer of the Order of Saint Ferdinand (Spain)
- Other work: Deputy (district of Cantal): Chamber of the Second Restoration (1827–1830); Chamber of the July Monarchy (1830)

Philippe Higonet (5 May 1782 – 12 February 1859) was a French general and politician. He was born on 5 May 1782 in Saint-Geniez-d'Olt (Aveyron) and died on 7 April 1862 in Aurillac (Cantal).

== Life ==
=== Youth ===
Son of Joseph Higonet, master apothecary, and of Marie Massabuau, Philippe Higonet was born on Sunday 5 May 1782, in Saint-Geniez-d’Olt, Aveyron. He was born in a family of nine children and was the younger brother of the future Colonel Joseph Higonet. He left his father's laboratory at the age of 21 to join the military camp of Boulogne, where Napoleon was assembling his "Grande Armée". He then enlisted, on 20 April 1804, in the 4th Regiment of Line Infantry. He was immediately appointed corporal, then sergeant on 30 June 1804.

=== Napoleonic Wars ===
On 9 February 1805, he was assigned with the rank of lieutenant to the 108th Regiment of Line Infantry, which was commanded by Colonel Joseph Higonet, his older brother. He was part of the 3rd Corps of Marshal Marshal Davout. On 8 November 1805, he took part in the battle of Mariazell where his conduct was described as "bold and brilliant". A few days later, on 2 December 1805, he signaled himself again at the Battle of Austerlitz where he was wounded in the right thigh.

Higonet was named Captain on 4 January 1806 and was knighted in the Order of the Legion of Honour on 14 May 1806. During the battle of Auerstedt (14 October 1806), captain Higonet showed skill and daring, but his brother, Colonel Joseph Higonet, died there (his name would later be engraved under the Arc de Triomphe, Eastern pillar, column 18). He distinguished himself again on 8 February 1807 during the battle of Eylau, where he was again wounded in the left leg and the lower abdomen. In 1809, he took part in the battles of Eckmühl (21-22 April 1809) and Wagram (5-6 July 1809). His heroic conduct was rewarded on 22 June 1809 by his assignment to the 1st Infantry Grenadier Regiment from the prestigious Imperial Guard.

In 1812 he was still captain of the grenadiers of the Imperial Guard when he took part in the campaign of Russia. He returned with a frozen foot and the rank of major in second. During the campaign of Germany, he took part in the siege of Hamburg in September 1813. On 1 March 1814, just before the abdication of Emperor Napoleon I, Marshal Davout elevated him to the rank of colonel, considering him as "one of the most brilliant officers in the army."

During the first Restoration, king Louis XVIII awarded him the cross of Knight of the Order of Saint Louis. Shortly after, the Colonel received command of the troops of Aveyron. But when Napoleon returned from Elba, Marshal Davout, Minister of War during the Hundred Days, placed Colonel Higonet at the head of the 10th Line Infantry Regiment, then of his former 108th Line Infantry Regiment. He then distinguished himself at the battle of Quatre Bras (16 June 1815), where he was wounded twice and then at the battle of Waterloo (18 June 1815), during the debacle of the French army.

=== Under the Restoration ===
After Napoleon's second abdication, Philippe Higonet rallied to Louis XVIII, who appointed him to form and command the Legion of Cantal on 19 August 1815. On 8 June 1816, he married Augustine, daughter of Baron Jean-François de Jujeals de Peyrac de Veillan. King Louis XVIII made him Baron shortly after. He then chose the motto of his coat of arms as "Virtus, labor, pietas". He was also made Officer of the Order of the Legion of Honour that same year of 1816.

The command of the 9th Line Infantry Regiment was then entrusted to Colonel Philippe Higonet, with whom he participated in 1823 in the expedition of Spain. On 11 August 1823, he was promoted to Maréchal de camp (Brigadier General) in recognition of his acts of bravery during the Siege of Pamplona. During the siege of San Sebastián on 3 September 1823, he obtained the capitulation of the city on the 28. The campaign finished, he then returned to France in March 1823. The following year, on 8 June 1824, he was promoted Commander of the Order of the Legion of Honour and raised to the dignity of Grand Officer of the Order of Saint Ferdinand of Spain.

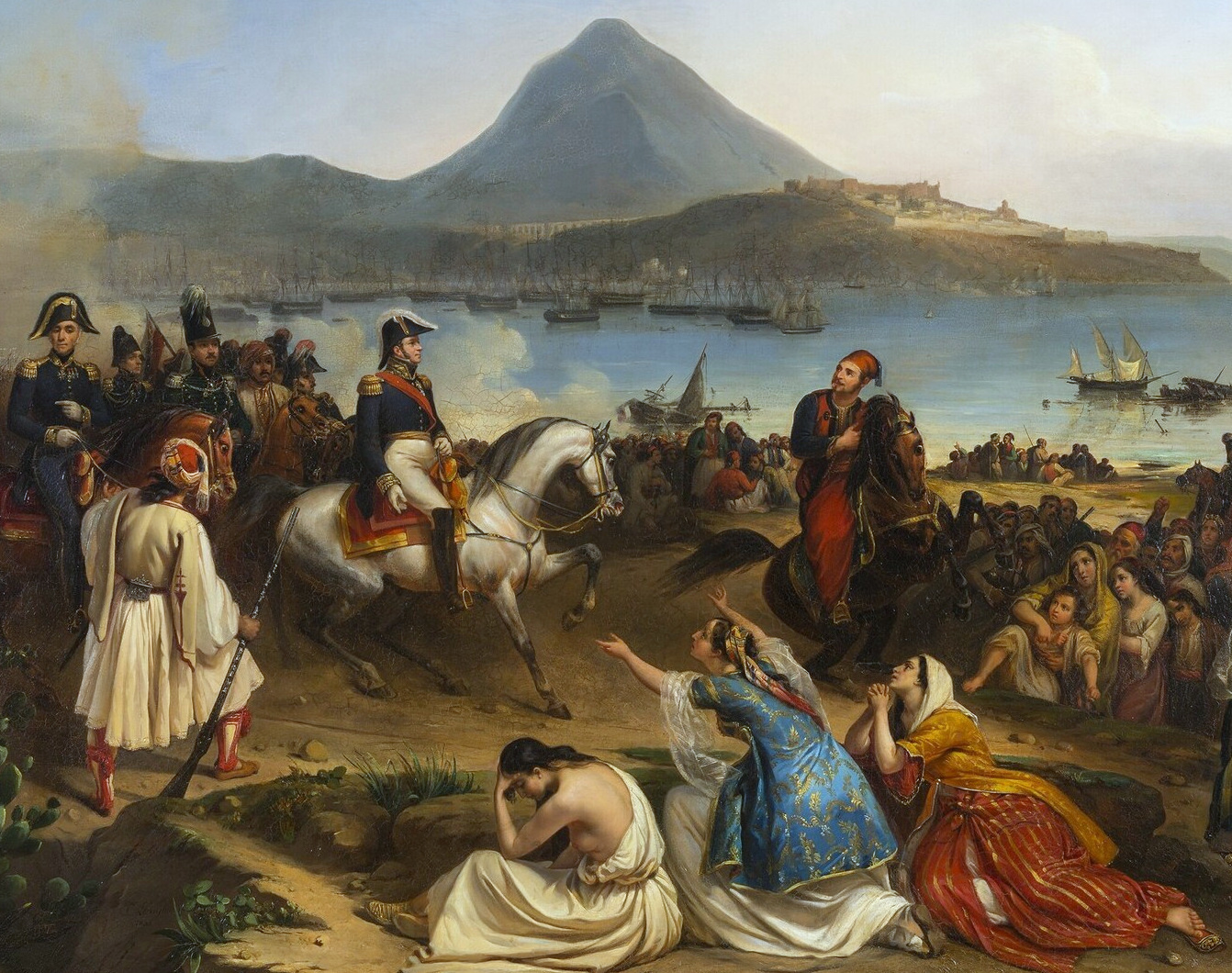
The French military expedition of Morea in 1828 (by Jean-Charles Langlois)

By the ordinance of 24 July 1828, he was then sent to Greece as a field marshal to participate in the Morea expedition (1828), under the orders of Marshal Maison, during the Greek War of Independence. At the head of the 2nd brigade of the expeditionary forces, he liberated the city of Navarino (on 7 October 1828) from the Turkish-Egyptian occupation troops of Ibrahim Pasha and then took the "Castle of Morea" of Patras (on 30 October 1828). Higonet stayed for a few months in Patras and he established there several health commissions for the freed but suffering Greek population, and even managed, in December 1828, to contain an outbreak of plague which was developing in the mountainous villages of Kalavryta and Vrachni. He finally left the Greek soil after four months of mission in the Peloponnese, on 9 January 1829, after having completely liberated Greece from the occupier. During this campaign, on 22 February 1829, he was promoted by king Charles X Commander of the Royal and Military Order of Saint-Louis and then, on his return to France, Commander of the Order of the Redeemer by the new independent Greek State, in 1830.

=== Parliamentary activities ===
Shortly before the Morea expedition, on 17 November 1827, as President of the electoral college of Cantal, he had been elected deputy (favorable to Charles X) of the 1st arrondissement of this department (Aurillac) at the Chamber of Deputies. He was re-elected for a second term of deputy on 23 June 1830.

But following the July Revolution, he resigned from his deputy mandate on 12 August 1830, and chose exile from the inside. After the French Revolution of 1848, he came out of his retirement and tried to be re-elected for a mandate of representative of the people at the National Legislative Assembly of the Second Republic, but this time without success.

=== Last years ===
After his resignation from his mandate as deputy on 12 August 1830, Philippe Higonet was placed on availability, retired to Aurillac and devoted himself, during eighteen years, to the administration of the domain of the Château de Veyrac, to which he made many improvements, and dealt exclusively with agriculture, becoming president of the Cantal Agriculture Society.

On 30 May 1848, he retired as a Maréchal de camp (Brigadier General).

He supported the candidacy of Louis-Napoleon Bonaparte during the presidential election of December 1848, but refused to swear allegiance after his coup of 2 December 1851. He then spent the last years of his life at Aurillac. Because of the wounds he received in February 1807 during the battle of Eylau, which made him suffer cruelly, he died on 12 February 1859 in Aurillac, at the age of 77. He was buried in the town's Massigoux cemetery. On one side of the funerary stele, his name and his honorary distinctions are surrounded by a mandorla (oval almond) on which are inscribed the names of his main battles: Mariazell, Austerlitz, Eylau, Les Quatre Bras, San Sebastian, Pamplona, Navarino and the Castle of Morea.

== Decorations, military ranks and representative positions ==
- 1st Baron Higonet (1816)
- Deputy of the district of Cantal (1827-1830)
- Brigadier General (Général de brigade) of the French army.
- French decorations:
  - Commander of the Royal and Military Order of Saint-Louis (22 February 1829).
  - Knight of the Order of the Legion of Honour (14 May 1806).
  - Officer of the Legion of Honour (1816).
  - Commander of the Legion of Honour (8 June 1824).
- Foreign decorations:
  - Grand officer of the Order of Saint Ferdinand (Spain) (1823)
  - Commander of the Order of the Redeemer (Greece) (1834)

== Annexes ==
=== Bibliography ===
- « Le général baron Higonet (Philippe)», notice dans Aimé de Birague, Mémorial universel généalogique et biographique, Institut des archives historiques, Paris, 1851–1852.
- "Philippe Higonet", in Adolphe Robert and Gaston Cougny, Dictionnaire des parlementaires français (1789–1891), Bourloton, Paris, 1889 Edition details Wikisource.
- Bernard Maury, « Général Baron Philippe Higonet, Comment un Marmot est devenu Général et Baron », Cercle généalogique de l’Aveyron, édité par Suzanne Barthe, 27 juillet 2018.

=== External links ===
- Resources related to his public life: Base Léonore; Base Sycomore :
  - "Notice no. LH/1300/58". Base Léonore (in French). (National Order of the Legion of Honour)
  - « List of the parliamentary terms of Philippe Higonet (1782 - 1859) », Base Sycomore, (French National Assembly).

=== Linked articles ===
- Morea expedition
- List of members of the Morea expedition (1828-1833)
