= Antoine Virgile Schneider =

French general and politician

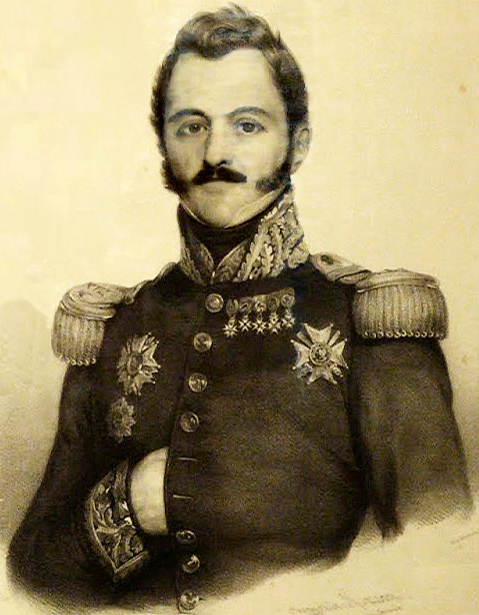
- Born: 22 March 1779; Bouquenom, Bailiwick of Sarreguemines, France
- Died: 11 July 1847 (aged 68) Paris, France
- Rank: Lieutenant general (1831)
- Commands: Spain expedition (1823); Morea expedition (1828)
- Conflicts: Napoleonic Wars
- Awards: Name engraved under the Arc de Triomphe; Grand-croix of the Legion of Honour; Grand-commander of the Order of the Redeemer (Greece); Commander of the Order of Leopold (Belgium)
- Other work: Deputy (district of Moselle): Chamber of the July Monarchy (1834–1848)

Antoine Virgile Schneider (22 March 1779 – 11 July 1847) was a French general and politician. He was Minister of War under the July Monarchy in the second government of Jean de Dieu Soult from 12 May 1839 to 1 March 1840.

== Biography ==
Antoine Virgile Schneider was born on 22 March 1779 at Bouquenom, and was the son of doctor Christophe Schneider. He was the cousin of Adolphe Schneider and Eugène Schneider, who developed the iron industry at Le Creusot. Virgil Schneider graduated from the École Polytechnique in the year VII of the 1st French Republic (1799).

A memoir on the Greek island of Corfu addressed to Napoleon Bonaparte earned him his appointment as supernumerary in Military engineering. He was Lieutenant during the Polish campaign, Captain during the Spanish Civil War (1808), he took part in the sieges of Zaragoza (1808–1809) and Figueres (1811). He was created a Knight of the Empire on 23 February 1811, he became aide-de-camp to General Clarke. After a mission to the Ionian islands, he was besieged in Danzig in 1813 with General Rapp. He was appointed Colonel in 1815. Prisoner of War, he returned to France in 1814 and was, during the Hundred Days, Chief of Staff of Rapp, who commanded the 5th Corps, assigned to cover the Rhine.

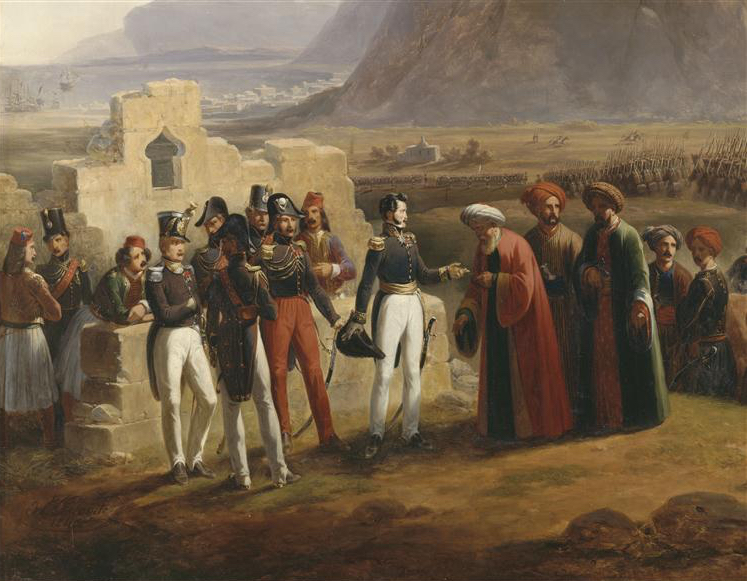
"Surrender of Patras to General Schneider" by Hippolyte Lecomte

Brought into inactivity by the Second Restoration, he was recalled to service in 1819 and took part in the campaign in Spain and particularly in the Siege of Pamplona in 1823 as colonel of the 20th Regiment of Light Infantry. Promoted to Maréchal de camp on 22 May 1825, he participated to the Morea expedition in Greece, under the command of Marshal Maison, and he directed the siege operations of the fortresses of the Peloponnese in October 1828. Heading the 3rd Brigade of the expeditionary force, he liberated the city of Patras (on 5 October 1828) and took the “Castle of Morea” of Patras (on 30 October 1828 ) to the Turkish-Egyptian occupation troops of Ibrahim Pasha. After having completely liberated Greece from the occupier, he was appointed commander-in-chief of the occupation troops in place of Marshal Maison, and received, at the time of his recall in July 1831, a sword of honor by the Greek government.

Promoted to Lieutenant-General on 12 August 1831 and appointed Chief of Staff at the Department of War on 20 November 1832, he was elected on 21 June 1834 deputy of the 6th district of Moselle (Sarreguemines), and re-elected on 4 November 1837 and 2 March 1839. He served in the majority but voted against the law of disjunction and was part of the coalition against the Louis Mathieu Molé Ministry. He voted for funding the Duke of Nemours and for the census.

Appointed Minister of War in the second government of Jean de Dieu Soult on 12 May 1839, he had to stand again before his electors, who confirmed his mandate on 8 June 1839. He kept his ministry until 1 March 1840. During his time in government, he improved the lives of the officers and reorganized the General Staff.

On 28 November 1840, General Schneider was given command of the troops of the external division of Paris, which cooperated in the work of the fortifications of the capital and, on 17 July 1841, he became president of the infantry committee. Re-elected as a deputy on 9 July 1842 and on 1 August 1846, he voted against the compensation Pritchard and the Rémusat proposal.

== Decorations ==
- Name engraved under the Arc de Triomphe (Northern pillar, Column 7)
- Grand-officier of the Legion of Honour (22 February 1829)
- Grand-croix of the Legion of Honour (14 April 1844)
- Grand-commander of the Order of the Redeemer (Greece) (Almanach royal et national 1835)
- Commander of the Order of Leopold (Belgium) (Almanach royal et national 1835)

== Works ==
- Virgile Schneider, Histoire et description des îles Ioniennes, Dondey-Dupré, Paris, 1823.
- Virgile Schneider, Résumé des attributions et devoirs de l'infanterie légère en campagne, Dondey-Dupré, Paris,1823.
- Virgile Schneider also collaborated to the Spectateur militaire.

== See also ==
- Henri Schneider
- Eugène Schneider II
- Charles Schneider
- Château de la Verrerie (Saône-et-Loire)
- List of members of the Morea expedition (1828-1833)

Political offices
Preceded by Amédée Louis Despans-Cubières	Minister of War; 12 May 1839 – 1 March 1840	Succeeded by Amédée Louis Despans-Cubières
