= Tiburce Sébastiani =

Tiburcio Sébastian de La Porta
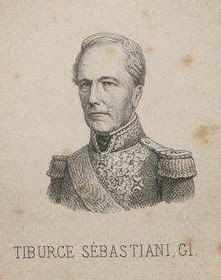
- Born: 21 March 1786 in La Porta (Haute-Corse)
- Died: 16 September 1871 (aged 85) in Bastia (Haute-Corse)
- Rank: General
- Commands: Morea expedition (1828)
- Conflicts: Napoleonic Wars
- Awards: Commander of the Order of Saint-Louis; Grand-croix of the Legion of Honour; Grand-commander of the Order of the Redeemer (Greece); Grand commander of the Order of Leopold (Belgium)
- Other work: Deputy (district of Corsica): Chamber of the Second Restoration (1828–1830); Chamber of the July Monarchy (1830–1835); Chamber of Peers (France) (1837–1848)

Jean André Tiburce, viscount Sébastiani de La Porta, was a French general and politician. He was born on 21 March 1786 in La Porta (Haute-Corse) and died on 16 September 1871 in Bastia (Haute-Corse). Deputy of Corsica from 1828 to 1837, and Peer of France, he was the brother of the Marshal of France and politician Horace Sébastiani.

== Life ==
=== Youth ===
Tiburce Sébastiani was born in La Porta (Haute-Corse) on 21 March 1786. He was the son of Joseph-Marie Sébastiani, a wealthy tailor and craftsman, and of the signora Maria Pietra Francesca Alterice Franceschi. His older brother was the future Marshal of France and politician Horace Sébastiani. Tiburce would later marry Marie Laetitia Paravicini on 19 November 1817. In 1789, during the French Revolution, the Sébastiani family was forced to move to France to flee the revolutionary troubles in Corsica. Tiburce was then a pupil of the National military Prytaneum of Paris, then of the Military School of Fontainebleau (Saint-Cyr), from where he left in October 1806 with the rank of Second lieutenant in the 1st regiment of Dragoons.

=== Napoleonic Wars ===
He participated first in the expedition of Portugal led by General Junot, where he took part in the battle of Vimeiro, then in Spain, under the orders of his brother General Horace Sébastiani (1809–1811), where he distinguished in the battles of Ciudad Real, Santa-Cruz, Talavera, Almonacid, in the passage of the Sierra Morena (where he was elevated to the rank of Knight of the Legion of Honour on 23 June 1810) and in the take of Malaga. He received command of mobile columns, at the head of which he fought in turn the Spaniards and the English, notably at Motril, which he captured, and under the walls of Gibraltar.

Called in 1812 to the Grande Armée, he was appointed aide-de-camp to the Count of Narbonne. He participated in the campaign of Russia, showed bravery there at the battle of Borodino, and was part of the vanguard that entered Moscow, as squadron commander of the 11th regiment of Horse Chasseurs. He was made Colonel in 1813 at the battle of Dresden and fought at the battles of Leipzig and Hanau. He showed real courage during the 1814 campaign and at the battle of Ligny. Very weak, he could not take part in the battle of Waterloo. After a final battle in Patte-d'Oie to protect the retreat of the French army, he retired with the remains of the army behind the Loire.

=== Under the Restoration ===
On the return of the Bourbons, he went to his native country, and three years later, in 1818, he was given command of the Corsican legion (12th Regiment of Horse Chasseurs). Appointed Maréchal de camp at the seniority, in 1823, he was rapidly being put in non-activity because of his political ideas and especially because of the political attitude of his brother Horace.

On 28 April 1828, the Grand College of Corsica, by 20 votes out of 35 voters, sent him to sit at the Chamber of Deputies. He voted with the constitutional party, in the opposition.

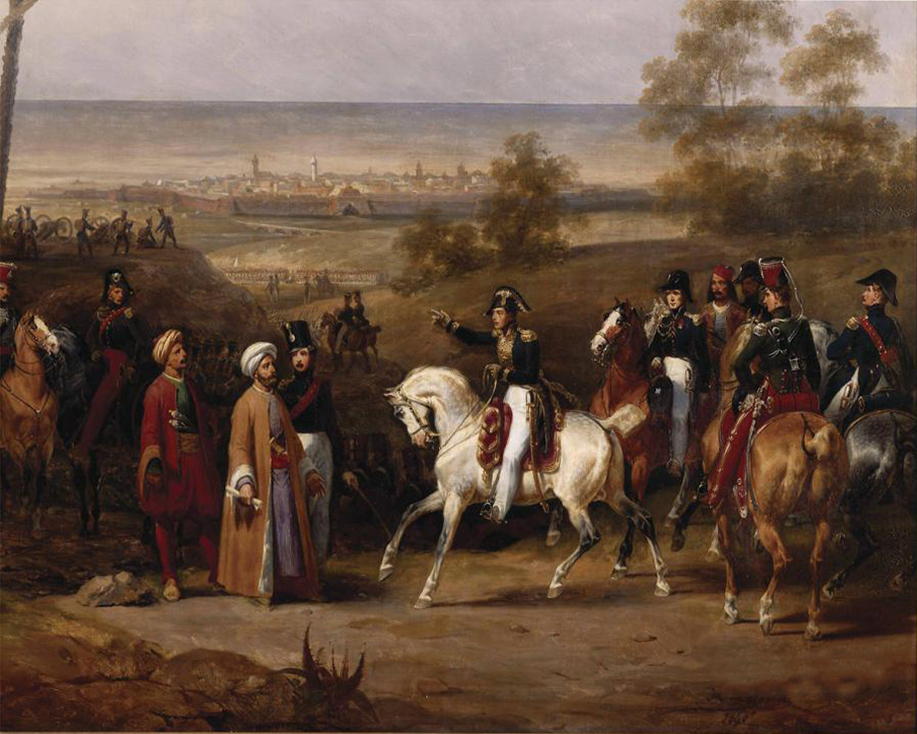
Capture of Coron by Maréchal de camp Sébastiani, on 9 October 1828 during the Morea expedition (detail, by Hippolyte Lecomte)

By the ordinance of 24 July 1828, he was then sent to Greece as a field marshal to participate in the Morea expedition (1828), under the orders of Marshal Maison, during the Greek War of Independence. At the head of the 1st brigade of the expeditionary forces, he liberated the city of Coron (on 7 October 1828) from the Turkish-Egyptian occupation troops of Ibrahim Pasha. He finally left the Greek soil after four months of mission in the Peloponnese, in 1829, after having completely liberated Greece from the occupier. Upon returning from this campaign, he was promoted by king Charles X Commander of the Royal and Military Order of Saint-Louis and then, Grand Commander of the Order of the Redeemer by the new independent Greek State, in 1830.

Following the July Revolution, Sébastiani was re-elected deputy (17 November 1830) by 22 votes (out of 37 voters), and received from the July Monarchy the rank of Lieutenant general on 27 February 1831.

In 1832 he received command of the First Division of the Army of the North and campaigned in Belgium, where he attended the siege of Antwerp.

Re-elected deputy, on 5 July 1831, in the first college of Corsica (Ajaccio), by 93 votes out of 97 voters, 148 registered, and then, on 5 July 1834, by 97 votes out of 98 voters, 150 registered, he did not cease support with his votes the government of king Louis-Philippe.

Raised to the Peerage on 3 October 1837, he followed the same line of conduct at the Luxembourg Palace (seat of the Chamber of Peers), became commander of the military division of Marseille, and, in 1842, of that of Paris, which he kept until the eve of the French Revolution of 1848.

Tiburce Sébastiani withdrew to Corsica after the revolution of 1848 and remained away from politics. He was raised to the rank of Grand Cross of the Legion of Honour on 5 January 1845. He died in Bastia (Haute-Corse) on 16 September 1871.

== Decorations ==
- French decorations:
  - Commander of the Royal and Military Order of Saint-Louis (22 February 1829).
  - Knight of the Order of the Legion of Honour (23 June 1810).
  - Officer of the Legion of Honour (18 February 1814).
  - Commander of the Legion of Honour (16 November 1832).
  - Grand-officer of the Legion of Honour (29 April 1833).
  - Grand-croix of the Legion of Honour (5 January 1845).
- Foreign decorations:
  - Grand-Commander of the Order of the Redeemer (Greece)
  - Grand-commander of the Order of Leopold (Belgium)
- Viscount (30 June 1830).
- Pair de France on 3 October 1837

== See also ==
- Morea expedition
- List of members of the Morea expedition (1828-1833)

== Bibliography ==
- « Sébastiani (Jean André Tiburce, vicomte) », dans Adolphe Robert et Gaston Cougny, Dictionnaire des parlementaires français, Edgar Bourloton, 1889–1891 [détail de l’édition] [texte sur Sycomore];
- Sébastiani (Tiburce, vicomte), « Biographies et nécrologies des hommes marquants du XIXe siècle », Volume 2, p. 193, Victor Lacaine et H.-Charles Laurent, 1845.
- Sébastiani Tiburce, « Dictionnaire des colonels de Napoléon », pp. 787–788, Danielle and Bernard Quintin (preface by Jean Tulard), editions SPM-Lettrage, Paris, 2013.
