= List of members of the Morea expedition =

The Morea expedition was an intervention of the French Army in the Peloponnese (then known by its medieval name "Morea") between 1828 and 1833, at the time of the Greek War of Independence, with the aim of liberating the region from the Turkish-Egyptian occupation forces. The members were drawn from military and scientific institutions.

Among the members of the expedition present in Morea, ten would subsequently become Ministers (of War, Navy or Foreign Affairs in France, or of Education in Greece for Michel Schinas) and one Prime Minister of France (Eugène Cavaignac).

== Members of the military expedition ==
The complete organizational chart of the General Staff is given by Captain Alexandre Duheaume in annex to his Souvenirs de la Morée, pour servir à l'histoire de l'expédition française en 1828-1829., Anselin, Paris, 1833.

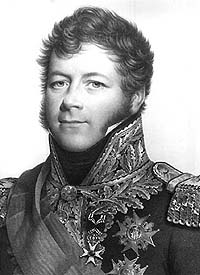
General Nicolas Joseph Maison, commander-in-chief of the expeditionary force from 1828 to 1829

- Lieutenant-General Nicolas Joseph Maison: commander-in-Chief of the expeditionary force from 1828 to 1829. He was appointed Marshal of France on February 22, 1829. After his return from Morea, he was appointed Minister of Foreign Affairs in 1830, then Minister of War in 1835. In 1834, he was made Grand Cross of the Greek Order of the Redeemer (the highest decoration awarded by the modern Greek state).
- Admiral Henri de Rigny: commander of the French fleet victorious at the Battle of Navarin on 20 October 1827. He was appointed Minister of the Navy in 1830 and in 1831, then Minister of Foreign Affairs in 1834.
- Field Marshal Antoine Simon Durrieu: chief of the General Staff.
- Field Marshal Tiburce Sébastiani: commander of the 1st brigade. He is the brother of Marshal Horace Sebastiani.
- Field Marshal Philippe Higonet: commander of the 2nd brigade.
- Field Marshal Virgile Schneider: commander of the 3rd brigade and of the occupation brigade from 1829 to 1831. He was appointed Minister of War in 1839. In 1835, he was made Grand Commander of the Greek Order of the Redeemer.
- Field Marshal Charles Louis Joseph Olivier Guéhéneuc: he replaced General Schneider at the head of the occupation brigade from 1831 to 1833.
- Colonel in the Royal Corps Camille Alphonse Trézel: Deputy Chief of Staff and brother of the painter Pierre Félix Trézel (member of the Archaeology section of the Morea scientific expedition). He was appointed Minister of War in 1847, the last in the July Monarchy before the French revolution of 1848.
- General Charles Nicolas Fabvier: philhellene who had organized the Greek army. He was responsible for accompanying the expedition for his knowledge of the terrain. In 1845, the third Greek National Assembly of Troezen made him a Greek Honorary Citizen and King Otto made him Grand Cross of the Greek Order of the Redeemer (the highest decoration awarded by the modern Greek state).
- Colonel of General Staff Guillaume Corbet: he was made Commander of the Greek Order of the Redeemer.
- Captain of General Staff, Aide-de-camp Jean Baptiste Eugène, vicomte Maison: he was the son of Lieutenant-General Maison.
- Lieutenant Aide-Major Napoléon-Hector Soult, marquis of Dalmatia: attached to Headquarters. He is the son of the famous Napoleonic Marshal Jean-de-Dieu Soult, Duke of Dalmatia (and future French Prime Minister). After his return from Morea, Hector Soult will enter French diplomacy and will also become a conservative deputy under the French Second Republic. he published his diplomatic observations and considerations on Greece in 1831.
- Colonel Paul-Eugène de Faudoas-Barbazan: 3rd regiment of Horse Chasseurs.
- Lieutenant-Colonel Joseph-Victor Audoy: commander of the military engineering and of the sappers.
- Colonel Antoine-Charles-Félix Hecquet: 54th Line Infantry Regiment.
- Colonel Amédée Despans-Cubières: he was appointed twice Minister of War, in 1839 and in 1840.
- Colonel Félix-Louis de Narp.
- Colonel Joseph-Marcelin Rullière: he was appointed Minister of War under the French Second Republic in 1848.
- Colonel, then brigade General (artillery) Jean Ernest Ducos de Lahitte: he was later appointed Minister of Foreign Affairs under the French Second Republic in 1849.
- Lieutenant-Colonel Anatole Mangin: 58th Line Infantry Regiment. He was made Commander of the Greek Order of the Redeemer.
- Lieutenant-Colonel Maxime Raybaud: he served for several years in Greece under the orders of Colonel Fabvier and Prince Alexandros Mavrokordatos (several times Prime Minister of Greece), of which he was the aide-de-camp. He was the founder and director of a Franco-Greek printing press and newspaper, "Le Courrier d'Orient", in Patras in 1829.
- Lieutenant-Colonel Sanfourche: 42nd Line Infantry Regiment and governor of the fortress of Patras.
- Captain of General Staff Stamatis Voulgaris: "detaché to the President of Greece" (sometimes written Stamati Bulgari). With Captain Garnot, he draws urban plans for several Greek cities (Tripolitza, Corinth, Nafplio and Patras). He was also the first city planner in Greek history. In his youth, he studied painting in David's atelier and was afterwards one of the first members of the Barbizon School.
- Captain Jean Pierre Eugène Félicien Peytier: "detaché to the President of Greece", engineer geographer and cartographer, painter (sometimes named Eugène, but more often Pierre). He made the first maps of the new Greek state in 1832 and in 1852.
- Captain Auguste-Théodore Garnot: "détaché to the President of Greece", military engineering, with Captain Voulgaris, he draws urban plans for several Greek cities (Tripolitza, Corinth, Nafplio and Patras)
- Captain Jean-Henri-Pierre-Augustin Pauzié: "détaché to the President of Greece", in the artillery. He founded the Artillery Academy (Σχoλή Πυρoβoλικoύ), then the Central Hellenic Military Academy of the Evelpides (Κεντρική Στρατιωτική Σχολή Ευελπίδων) on the French model of the École Polytechnique.
- Captain Auguste Regnaud de Saint-Jean d’Angély: volunteer, interpreter and philhellene. He followed Colonel Fabvier in Greece in 1825 in order to organize the Greek army, of which he became commander of the cavalry. He was appointed Minister of War under the French Second Republic in 1851, then Marshal of France in 1859.
- Captain François Dominique Victor Esperonnier: squadron commander, artillery and engineering. He was made Commander of the Greek Order of the Redeemer.
- Lieutenant Sébastien-Louis-Gabriel Jorry: governor of the fortress of Navarino from 1830 to 1833.
- Pierre François Lacenaire: famous poet, adventurer and murderer, he deserted just before embarking on the expedition.
- Joseph Charles Maurice Mathieu de la Redorte: artillery.
- Battalion Chief Grégoire Benoist: volunteer.
- Captain in second Louis Eugène Cavaignac: military engineering. He was appointed Minister of War and Prime Minister of France under the French Second Republic in 1848. He was made Gold Cross of the Greek Order of the Redeemer. His testimony on the expedition was published in 1897.
- Captain Alexandre Duheaume: 58th Line Infantry Regiment. His testimony on the expedition was published in 1833.
- Jacques Mangeart: he was the co-founder of a Franco-Greek printing press and newspaper, "Le Courrier d'Orient", in Patras in 1829. His testimony of the expedition was published in 1830.
- Doctor Gaspard Roux: Chief doctor of the military expedition. His testimony on the expedition was published in 1829.

== Members of the scientific expedition ==
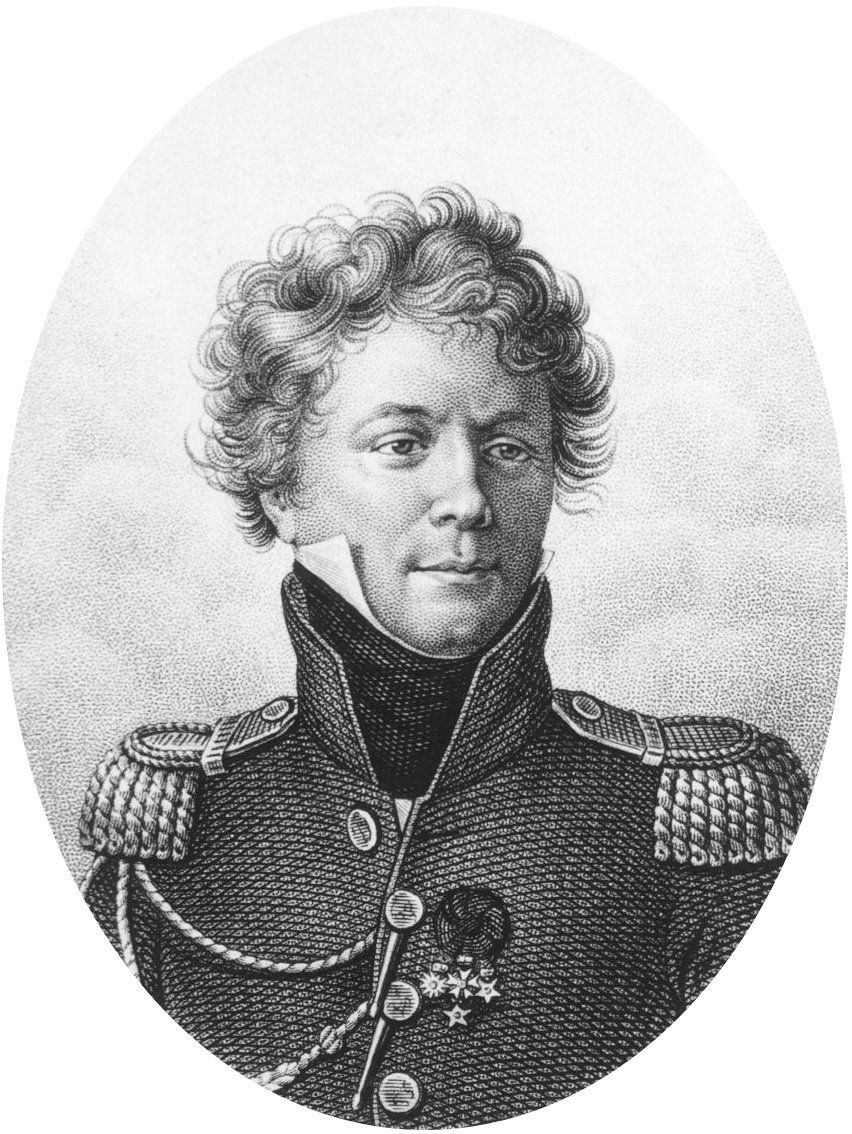
Colonel Jean Baptiste Bory de Saint-Vincent (officer, naturalist and geographer), head of scientific expedition

=== Physical Sciences section ===
- Jean-Baptiste Bory de Saint-Vincent: colonel, naturalist and geographer. He was the head of the scientific expedition and one of the main authors of works published by this scientific mission. He also headed the Section of Physical Sciences.
- Prosper Baccuet: lieutenant of Horse Grenadiers of the Royal Guard and landscape painter.
- Louis Despréaux Saint-Sauveur (also called Jean-Marie Despréaux Saint-Sauveur, not to be confused with Louis-Félix Despréaux Saint-Sauveur, French vice-consul at Thessaloniki at that time): botanist, specialist of cryptogams, lichens, fungi and algae.
- Gabriel Bibron: zoologist, herpetologist and naturalist aide.
- Gaspard Auguste Brullé: zoologist entomologist.
- Sextius Delaunay: zoologist.
- Antoine Vincent Pector: zoologist.
- Gérard Paul Deshayes: conchologist, malacologist and geologist.

==== Geology, Topography and Cartography ====
- Émile Puillon Boblaye: geologist.
- Pierre Théodore Virlet d’Aoust: geologist.
- Jean Pierre Eugène Félicien Peytier: "detaché to the President of Greece", engineer geographer and cartographer, painter (sometimes named Eugène, but more often Pierre).
- Pierre Lapie: colonel, geographer, cartographer and topographer.
- Aristide-Camille Servier: engineer geographer.

=== Archaeology section ===
- Léon-Jean-Joseph Dubois: archaeologist, designer, pupil of Jacques-Louis David and collaborator of Jean-François Champollion at the Louvre museum. He headed the Section of Archaeology.
- Charles Lenormant: archaeologist and also collaborator of Champollion, with whom he has just returned from his expedition to Egypt in 1828. He was deputy director of the Section of Archaeology.
- Edgar Quinet: historian, philosopher, poet and future deputy and professor at the Collège de France. Upon his return from the Morea expedition, he published De la Grèce moderne, et de ses rapports avec l’antiquité, in 1830.
- Eugène-Emmanuel Amaury-Duval: painter, he is one of the first students to be admitted to the atelier of Jean-Auguste-Dominique Ingres.
- Pierre Félix Trézel: painter and brother of the colonel in the Royal Corps Camille Alphonse Trézel (Deputy Chief of Staff of the military expedition of Morea).
- Michel Schinas: writer and linguist After having been living eleven years between Paris (where he encouraged Philhellenic circles) and Greece (where he took an active part in the war of independence), he joined the scientific mission of which he was the only Greek member. His project aimed to unify the Greek language and establish a dictionary of modern Greek. He became the Greek Minister of Education in 1843.

=== Architecture and Sculpture section ===
- Guillaume Abel Blouet: architect, prix de Rome in 1821. On his return from Greece, he was responsible for completing the Arc de Triomphe de l'Étoile which was inaugurated in 1836. He headed the Section of Architecture and Sculpture and was one of the main authors of works published by this scientific mission.
- Amable Ravoisié: architect and archaeologist.
- Frédéric de Gournay: painter.
- Pierre Achille Poirot: painter.
- Jean-Baptiste Vietty: Hellenist, archaeologist and sculptor. He quickly left his colleagues in the scientific expedition to visit Greece alone and continued his research in the country in extremely difficult material conditions until August 1831. He died prematurely in France in 1842, in great poverty and without having published a single page of his research in Morea (according to the testimony of the geologist Virlet d'Aoust in a letter to the ministry of 1843). For some reason still unknown, all of his manuscripts, notes and sketches were lost by the Ministry of the Interior around 1848 and still cannot be found today, with the exception of the two recently discovered notebooks.
