= Chemin de Fer Touristique du Tarn =

Light railway in Tarn, France

Coordinates: 43°45′51″N 1°45′46″E

Tarn Light Railway
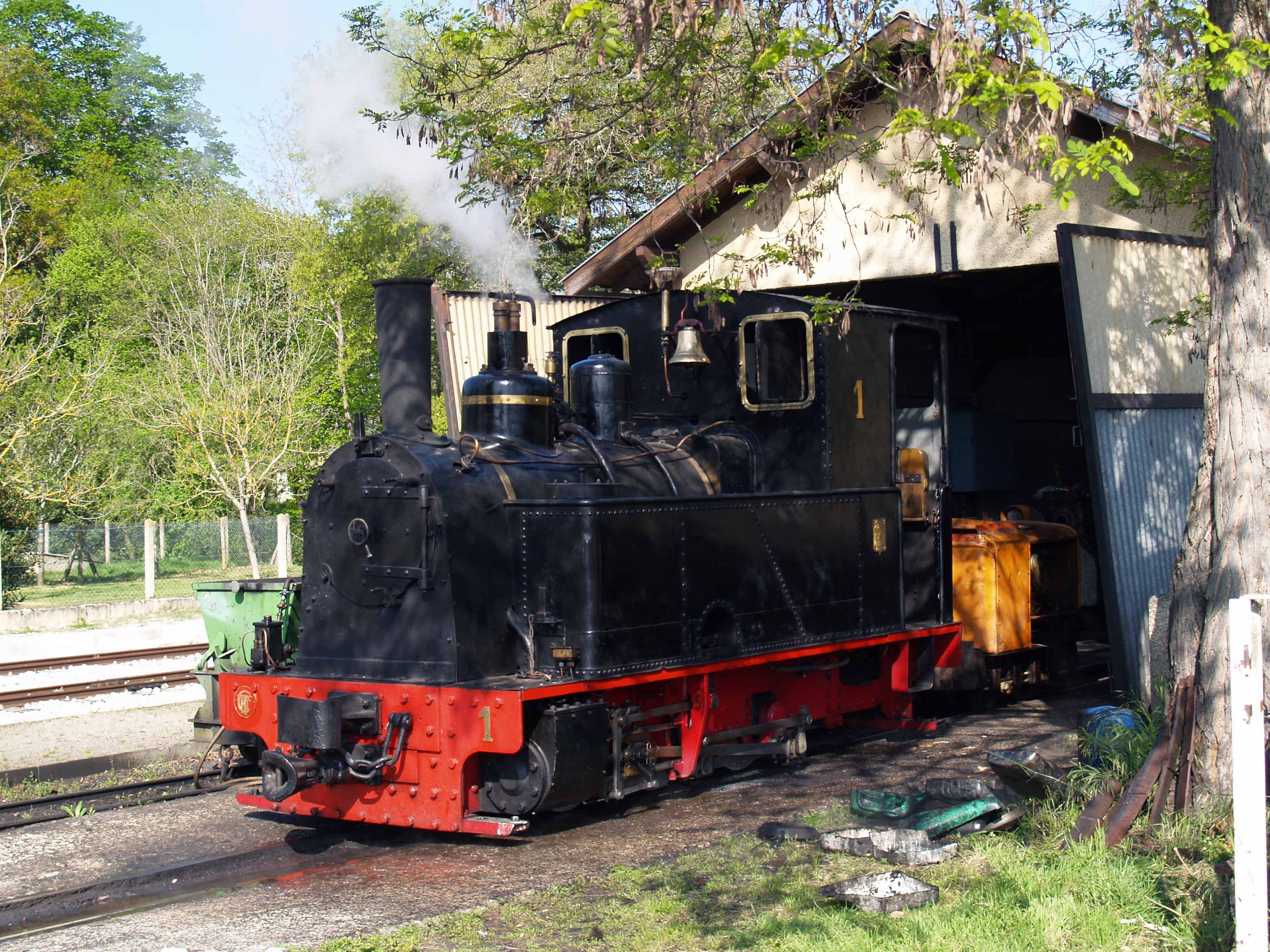
- 0-6-0T Couillet
- Locale: France
- Terminus: Saint-Lieux-lès-Lavaur

Commercial operations
- Name: Chemin de Fer Touristique du Tarn
- Built by: Compagnie des chemins de fer à voie étroite et tramways à vapeur du Tarn (TVT)
- Original gauge: 600 mm (1 ft 11 5/8 in)

Preserved operations
- Operated by: ACOVA (Association pour la Conservation Occitane de Véhicules Anciens )
- Stations: 2
- Length: 3.5 km (2.2 mi)
- Preserved gauge: 500 mm (19 3/4 in)

Commercial history
- Opened: 1925
- Closed: 1931

The Chemin de Fer Touristique du Tarn (CFTT), or Tarn Light Railway, is a narrow-gauge light railway near the village of Saint-Lieux-lès-Lavaur, in the vicinity of Saint-Sulpice in the department of Tarn, France. It is run as a heritage railway by a French association, the ACOVA (Association pour la Conservation Occitane de Véhicules Anciens) incorporated in 1975 and based in Toulouse. It operates on a 500 mm (19 3/4 in) gauge and the line was reconstructed from 1974 over a length of 3.5 kilometers (2.2 mi) on the trackbed of the former line from La Ramière to Saint-Sulpice which operated only from 11 April 1925, to 20 June 1931.

The line starts from the Saint Lieux-lès-Lavaur terminus at the former station ex-TVT and follows the streets of Saint-Lieux till a 132-metre (433 ft) long viaduct over the river Agout. Then it runs in the Tarn countryside and woods before arriving at the present terminus at les Martels.

The ACOVA owns five steam locomotives, among which three are operating and four are considered as monuments historiques. One of them is coming from New Caledonia and was originally in the 500mm gauge (Decauville 0-4-0T) and the others have been adapted from 600 mm (1 ft 11 5/8 in) gauge hardware.

The Tarn Light Railway is operating from begin of April to the end of October, on Sundays and holidays, and every day of the week in July and August. The trains perform a one-hour travel between the Saint-Lieux station and the Les Martels terminus.

It is planned to extend the line to reach the hamlet and chapel of Saint-Cyriaque.

As of 2008, the current ridership is 24,000 per year.

== Steam engines in working order ==
CFTT Registration	Engine	Builder	Year	Serial number
1	030T COUILLET	Couillet	1910	1576
3	020T DECAUVILLE	Decauville	1947	1132
4	020T DECAUVILLE	Decauville	1929	1111

== See also ==
- Minimum-gauge railway
- Narrow gauge railway
