= Amédée Despans-Cubières =

French general and politician

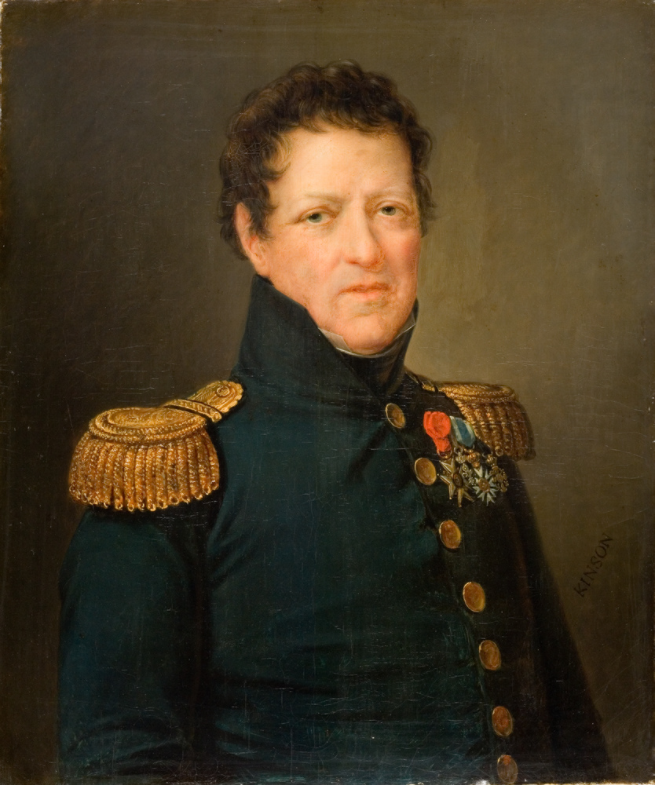
- Portrait by François-Joseph Kinson
- Nickname: Despans-Cubières
- Born: 4 March 1786; Paris, France
- Died: 6 August 1853 (aged 67) Paris, France
- Allegiance: France
- Branch: French Army
- Service years: 1803–1853
- Rank: Général de division
- Conflicts: Napoleonic Wars; Battle of Austerlitz; Battle of Jena (WIA); Battle of Eylau; Battle of Eckmühl; Battle of Aspern-Essling; Battle of Wagram; Battle of Borodino; Hundred Days; Battle of Quatre-Bras (WIA); Battle of Waterloo (WIA); Spanish expedition; Morea expedition
- Awards: Légion d'honneur Order of Saint Louis; Peer of France; Order of the Redeemer
- Other work: Minister of War

General Amédée Louis de Cubières (4 March 1786 – 6 August 1853), known as Despans-Cubières, was a French general and politician.

== Life ==
=== Youth ===
He was the illegitimate son of marquis Louis Pierre de Cubières (page to Louis XV and squire to Louis XVI then, in 1815, of Louis XVIII) by Madame Guesnon de Bonneuil (née Michelle Sentuary). As a child he played the role of Love at a festival given at the Hermitage at Versailles by his father and mother in honour of Marie-Antoinette. Aged 6, Amédée Despans-Cubières was briefly imprisoned with his family in the prison des Récollets of Versailles after the day of 10 August 1792, before he was made one of the "enfants de la liberté" raised by the state at the former abbey of Saint-Martin, before being welcomed into the Jordan family. In 1803, at the request of his mother Madame de Bonneuil, he was adopted by his father and took his name.

=== First Empire ===
Placed in the prytanée at Saint-Cyr, he entered the army as a private in the 1st Cuirassier Regiment in 1803 and entering the military school at Fontainebleau on 23 October 1804, leaving it as a sous-lieutenant in the 15th Regiment of the Line. He served in that regiment in the Austerlitz, Prussian and Polish campaigns, being mentioned in despatches at Austerlitz and wounded at Jena (1806). Promoted to lieutenant on 30 November 1806 he received the cross of the Légion d'honneur at Eylau (1807).

Aide-de-camp to general Morand (from 12 January 1808), he followed him in the Austrian campaign of 1809, the French invasion of Russia in 1812 and the 1813 German campaign. He fought with distinction at Eckmühl and rose to captain at Essling (7 June 1809). He assisted at the battle of Wagram (6 July 1809) and had three horses shot from under him at the battle of Borodino. Emperor Napoleon made him an officer of the Légion d’honneur in reward for his good conduct in the 1813 campaign, in which he had become chef de bataillon (promoted 3 October 1813). On 19 November 1813, he was made colonel of the 18th Light Infantry Regiment. Also in 1813 he married the novelist Aglaé Buffaut, daughter of his own half-sister Marie-Michelle Guesnon de Bonneuil, at first vicomtesse du Bouzet de Marin then Madame Philippe Buffaut.

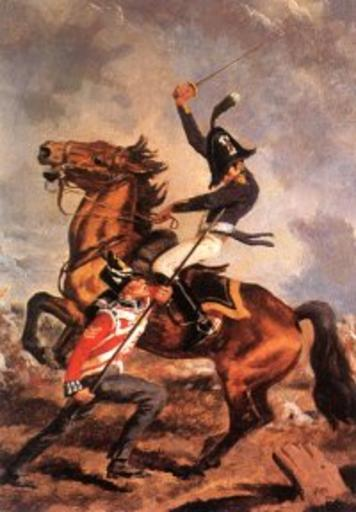
Scots Guard Sergeant A. Fraser unhorsing Col. Cuieres at Hougoumont Farm, June 1815

On Napoleon's return from Elba in 1815, colonel de Cubières was made colonel à la suite to the 1st Light Infantry Regiment, of which the titular colonel was Beurnonville. According to Jolyet, Napoleon reviewed this regiment on the day after his arrival back in Paris on 21 March and asked who was its commander. Cubières replied "Sir, it is colonel de Beurnonville; but he is ill." Napoleon replied "Beurnonville is not sick - it is you, colonel Cubières, who shall nevertheless take command of the 1st Light Infantry". Cubières wished to decline, but Napoleon did not give him time to do so. Although devoted to Napoleon, Cubières demanded his soldiers should come out against the Acte additionnel aux constitutions de l’Empire, to mark the need for a liberal and reforming government. The 1st Light Infantry was thus the only regiment to vote against it. In 1815, Despans-Cubières fought with his regiment at Waterloo and was wounded at Quatre-Bras and at Mont-Saint-Jean.

=== Bourbon Restoration ===
According to Jolyet, Cubières was "the most valiant soldier and the best man-of-war that I have known. With this [he brought] a remarkable beauty, a brilliant spirit, [and] a generous and independent love". One of the army's staff writing reports for the army dismissals after the Hundred Days stated that he had "an agreeable physique, [was] very instructive, an excellent colonel, [who] served with zeal and loyalty, excellent conduct" and decided that he was to be kept on in the Bourbon army. Despite that praise he lost his commission after the Hundred Days, but his father's influence at court allowed him to obtain the general receipt of the Meuse département and the cross of the Order of Saint Louis (1820). He returned to the army for the Spanish Expedition of 1823, and was put at the head of the 27th Regiment of Line Infantry. He also went on the Morea expedition with his regiment and received the brevet of maréchal de camp (27 February 1829).

=== July Monarchy ===
Promoted to commander of the Légion d’honneur (21 March 1831), he was made commander-in-chief of the French troops landed at Ancona in the Papal States (9 February 1832) to occupy the town in reprisal for Austrian intervention at Bologna. Returning to France in 1837 with the rank of lieutenant-general, he next became Minister of War in the 1839 transitional government (31 March-13 May 1839) then in Adolphe Thiers's second cabinet (1 March-29 October 1840). He attached his name to Paris's fortifications, to the decision to write a history of all France's regiments since Francis I and to the organisation of the chasseurs of Vincennes. Made a peer of France on 7 November 1839, he took part in the discussions of the Chambre des pairs on taxes and roads before being raised to grand officer of the Légion d’honneur on 27 April 1840.

=== The Teste-Cubières scandal ===
After leaving the army, general Despans-Cubières was compromised in the Teste-Cubières affair, one of the worst scandals of the July Monarchy. Despans-Cubières had bought 159000 shares (7% of the capital) in a business which, under the "concession de Gouhenans", had won authorisation to exploit the coal deposits in Gouhenans and the surrounding area. In searching for coal seams, the business had discovered a seam of rock salt and it demanded that it be given the concession to mine this, but was refused. Despite this, the business started extracting and selling the salt. One of its associates, Parmentier, was imprisoned and fined 500 francs and the salt mine was closed on 5 February 1835.

On 24 April 1841, the business again demanded the salt concession. General Despans-Cubières proposed to buy the authorisation demanded from the minister for public works, Jean-Baptiste Teste, and in an 1842 letter to his associates indicated "There is no hesitation on the means by which we should create a supporter within the council [of ministers]. I have the means of arriving at this supporter, and it is up to you to provide the means of interesting him [...] Do not forget that the government is in the hands of greedy and corrupt men." Teste accepted a bribe of 94,000 francs from the company. In the meantime, the 1844 novel The Count of Monte Cristo was published - according to Librairie Générale Française (1995), its character of Fernand Mondego was inspired by general Despans-Cubières.

The affair came to light in May 1847 during the trial of the associates of the mining company before the Seine civil tribunal. The company director, Parmentier, submitted in his defence several pieces of correspondence from general Despans-Cubières evoking bribery. The affair received massive publicity and the scandal echoed throughout government. The king decided to move the case to be tried before the Chambre des pairs. On 8 July 1847, Teste, Despans-Cubières, Parmentier and a certain Pellapra (former receiver-general who had served as intermediary) were brought before the high court on corruption charges and on 17 July general Despans-Cubières was condemned to civic degradation and a fine of 10,000 francs. Even so, on 17 August 1852 he won a decree of rehabilitation at the Court of Appeal at Rouen. Allowed to retire as a général de division on 1 January 1853, he died a few months later.

== Sources ==
- (in French) Adolphe Robert and Gaston Cougny, Dictionnaire des Parlementaires français, Paris, Dourloton, 1889

Political offices
Preceded by Simon Bernard	Minister of War; 31 March 1839 - 12 May 1839	Succeeded by Antoine Virgile Schneider
Preceded by Antoine Virgile Schneider	Minister of War; 1 March 1840 - 29 October 1840	Succeeded by Nicolas Jean de Dieu Soult, duc de Dalmatie
