= Saint-Lieux-lès-Lavaur =

- Commune
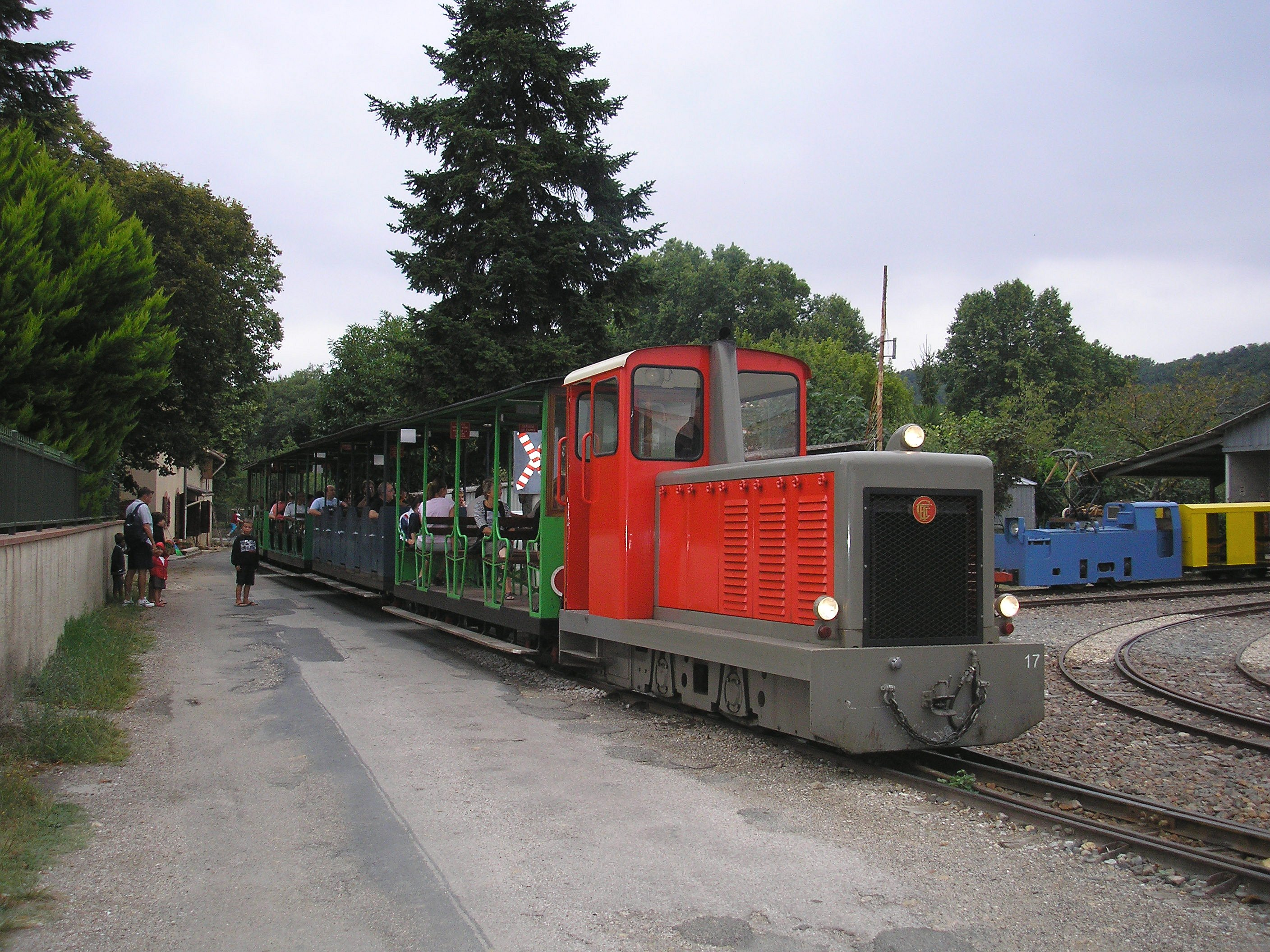
- The Tarn Light Railway

- Coat of arms
- Location of Saint-Lieux-lès-Lavaur
- Location within France Location within Occitanie
- Coordinates: 43°45′59″N 1°45′37″E
- Country: France
- Region: Occitania
- Department: Tarn
- Arrondissement: Castres
- Canton: Les Portes du Tarn
- Intercommunality: CC Tarn-Agout

Government
  - Mayor (2020–2026): Gilles Cormignon
- Area^{1}: 9.54 km^{2} (3.68 sq mi)
- Elevation: 110 m (360 ft)
- Highest elevation: 136 m (446 ft)
- Lowest elevation: 95 m (312 ft)
- Population (2023): 1,269
  - Density: 133/km^{2} (345/sq mi)
- Time zone: UTC+01:00 (CET)
  - Summer (DST): UTC+02:00 (CEST)
- INSEE/Postal code: 81261 /81500
- ^{1} French Land Register data, which excludes lakes, ponds, glaciers > 1 km^{2} (0.386 sq mi or 247 acres) and river estuaries.

Saint-Lieux-lès-Lavaur (French pronunciation: [sɛ̃ ljø lɛ lavoʁ], literally Saint-Lieux near Lavaur; Languedocien: Sant Lionç de La Vaur) is a commune in the Tarn department in southern France.

== See also ==
- Communes of the Tarn department
