= Defence Historical Service =

Archives centre of the French Ministry of Defence

Coordinates: 48.843°N 2.436°E

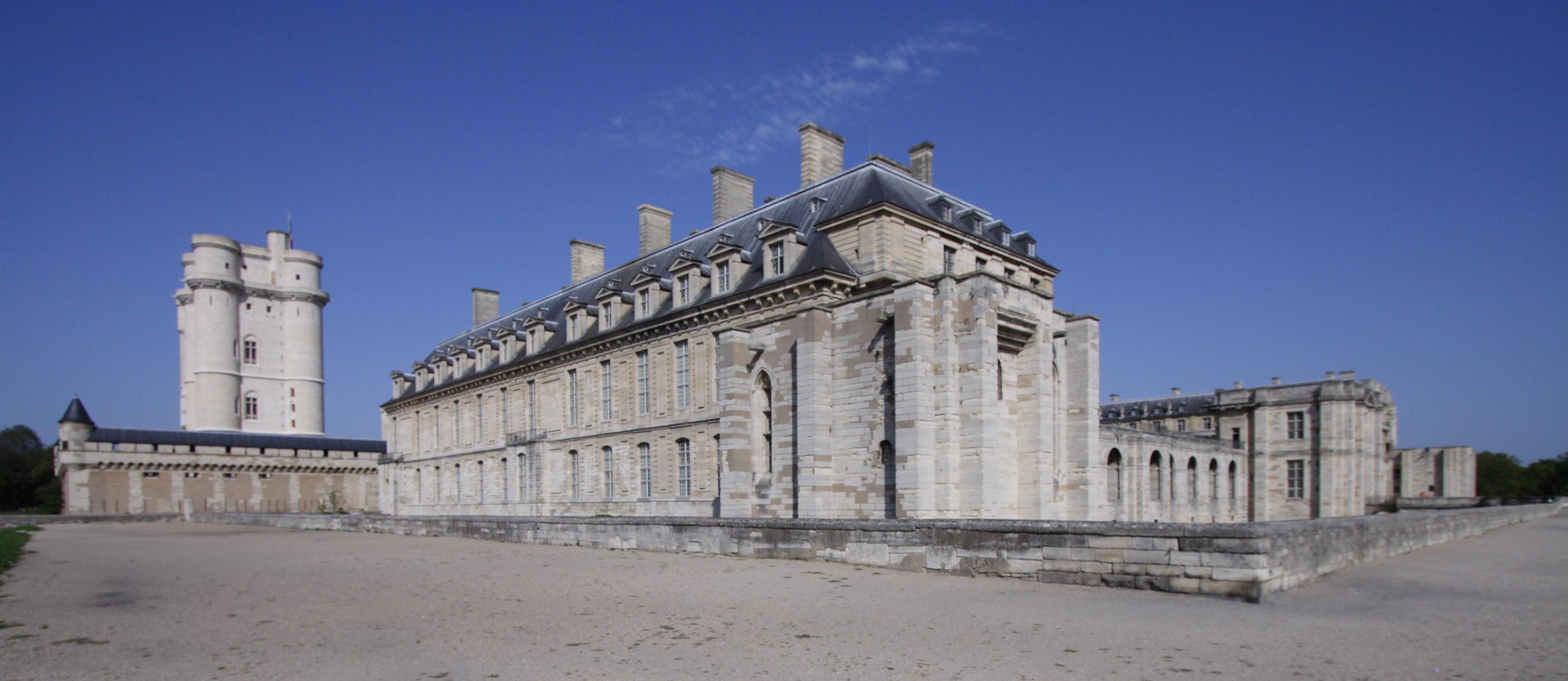
The SHD's main site at the château de Vincennes

In France, the Defence Historical Service (French: Service historique de la défense; SHD) is the archives centre of Ministry of Defence and its armed forces. It was set up by decree in 2005.

The SHD consists of the "Centre historique des archives" at Vincennes, the "Centre des archives de l’armement et du personnel" at Châtellerault and a number of smaller repositories. In total, the archives contain about 300 km of records of which 100 km are at Vincennes and 70 km at Châtellerault.

The SHD also harbors a research lab in War Studies, the "Division Recherches, Études et Enseignement (DREE)", staffed by ca. 20 professional historians, including both military officers and academic scholars. It deals prominently with French military history (17th-20th century) but some of its members also research broader issues of European, North American or global history.
