= Base Léonore =

Database of members of French Legion of Honour

Base Léonore, or the Léonore database, is a French database that lists the records of the members of the National Order of the Legion of Honor. The database lists the records of those inducted into the Legion of Honor since its 1802 inception and who died before 1977.

As of January 2014, the database contained 390,000 records.
