= Nicolas Joseph Maison =

French military officer (1771–1840)

Nicolas Joseph, marquis de Maison
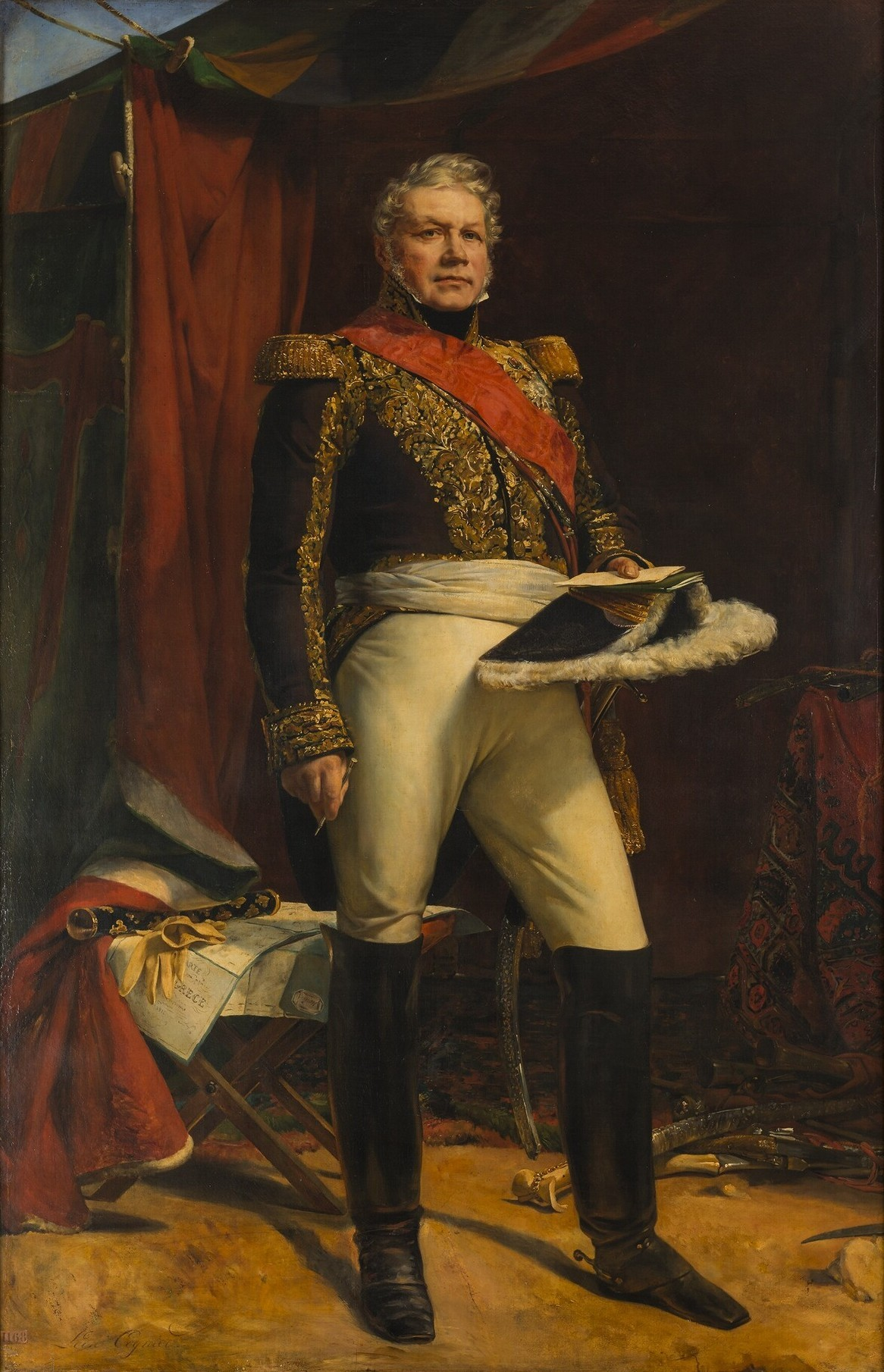
- Portrait of Nicolas Joseph Maison by Léon Cogniet, 1835
- Born: 19 December 1771; Épinay-sur-Seine, France
- Died: 13 February 1840 (aged 68); Paris, France
- Military career
- Service years: 1789–1836
- Rank: Marshal of France
- Commands: Morea expedition (1828)
- Conflicts: French Revolutionary Wars; Napoleonic Wars; Greek War of Independence
- Awards: Marquess; Peer of France; Name engraved on the Arc de Triomphe; Grand-croix of the Order of Saint-Louis; Grand-croix of the Legion of Honour; Knight of the Military Order of Maximilian Joseph (Bavaria); Grand Cross of the Royal Order of the Redeemer (Greece); Knight Grand Cross of the Order of Charles III (Spain); Grand Cordon of the Order of Leopold (Belgium)
- Other work: Minister of Foreign Affairs (1830); Minister of War (1835–1836)

Nicolas Joseph Maison, marquis de Maison (French: [nikɔla ʒozɛf mɛzɔ̃]; 19 December 1771 – 13 February 1840) was a French military officer who served in the French Revolutionary Wars, the Napoleonic Wars, and as commander of the Morea expedition during the Greek War of Independence. He was made a Marshal of France in 1829 and served as Minister of War from 1835 to 1836.

== Revolutionary Wars and Napoleonic Wars ==
Nicolas-Joseph Maison was born in Épinay-sur-Seine, near Paris on 19 December 1771. He enlisted in the Army in 1789 and on 1 August 1791, he was named captain in the 9th Battalion of Volunteers of Paris and served in the infantry in the early French Revolutionary Wars. He served as aide-de-camp to Minister of War Jean Bernadotte in 1799.

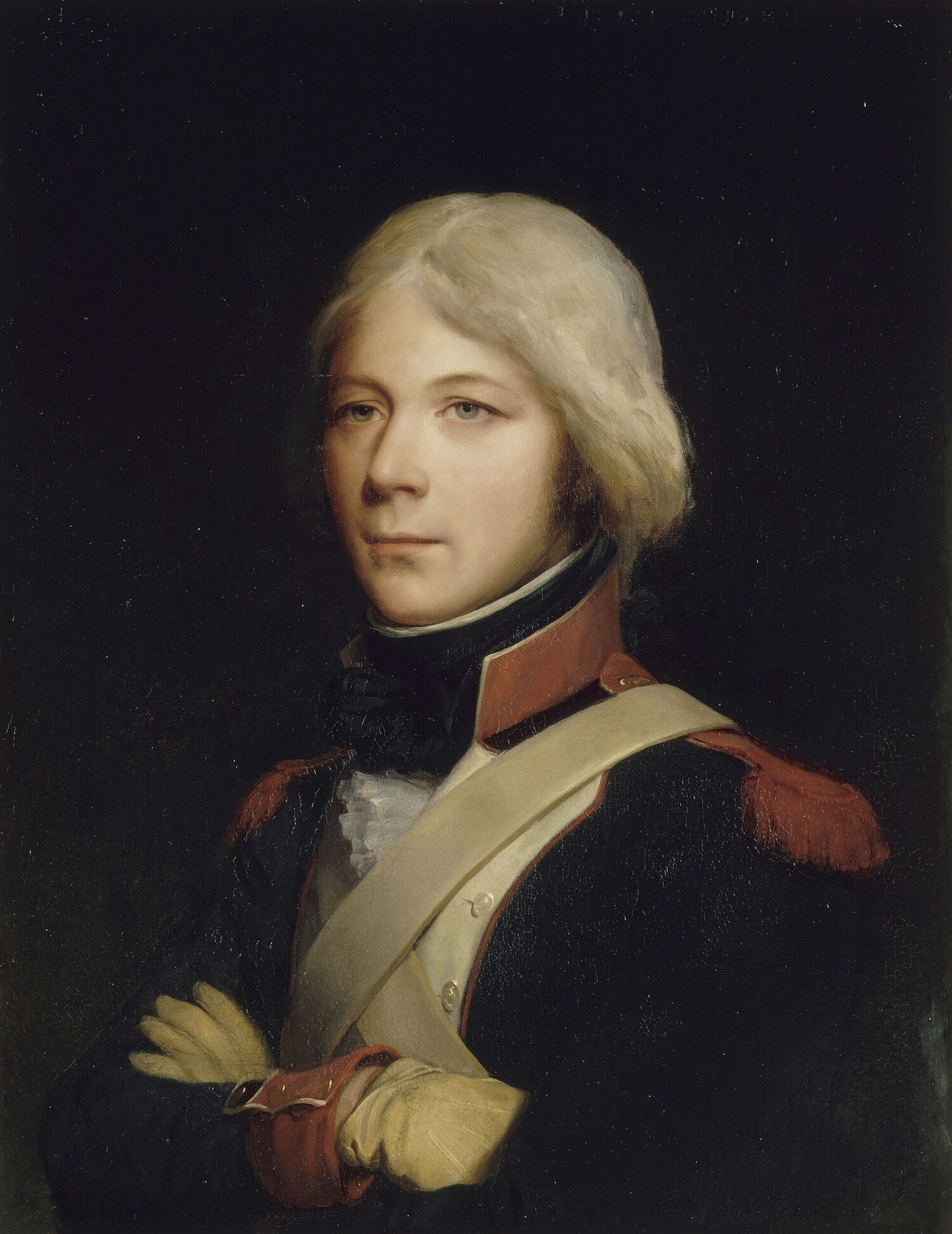
Nicolas Joseph Maison, grenadier in the 1st battalion of Paris in 1792, by Léon Cogniet (1834)

In 1805, he joined the I Corps of the Grande Armée assembled by Emperor Napoleon I and participated in the Battle of Austerlitz. During the campaign of 1806, he served as a General de brigade in the corps of Marshal Bernadotte and took part in the chase of the Prussian army to Lübeck after their defeat at Jena. In 1808 he was sent to Spain where he served under Marshal Victor and was wounded at the capture of Madrid. In 1812 he joined Napoleon in the invasion of Russia. At some point in the invasion Marshal Michel Ney saved his life, a deed he would later repay by refusing to join the court-martial which in 1815 was assembled to judge Ney after the Hundred Days. At the Beresina he was promoted to General de division and made a baron of the Empire.

After the wounding of Marshal Oudinot, he took over command of the II Corps and led it during the retreat to the Weischel. He served in the campaign of 1813 and after Marshal Jacques MacDonald's defeat at the Battle of Katzbach was once again tasked with leading the retreat. After the Battle of Leipzig, where he was wounded, he was given the Grand Cross of the Légion d'honneur and was made a count of the Empire. In 1814, he was tasked with defending what is now Belgium and the port of Antwerp. With inadequate forces, he managed to hold his own against greatly superior Allied forces and defeated Johann von Thielmann's Saxons at the Battle of Courtrai.

== Bourbon restoration ==
After the abdication of the emperor, Maison rallied to King Louis XVIII, who made him a Knight of St. Louis and appointed him Governor of Paris. During the Hundred Days, Maison stayed loyal to the Bourbons and joined them when they fled to Ghent. After the Second Restoration, he was made commandant of the 1st Military Division. He was put on the court martial appointed to judge Marshal Ney on a charge of treason for joining Napoléon but after he and his colleagues declared themselves incompetent he was demoted to command of the 8th Military Division in Marseille. In 1817, Maison was created a marquis and a Peer of France by Louis XVIII.

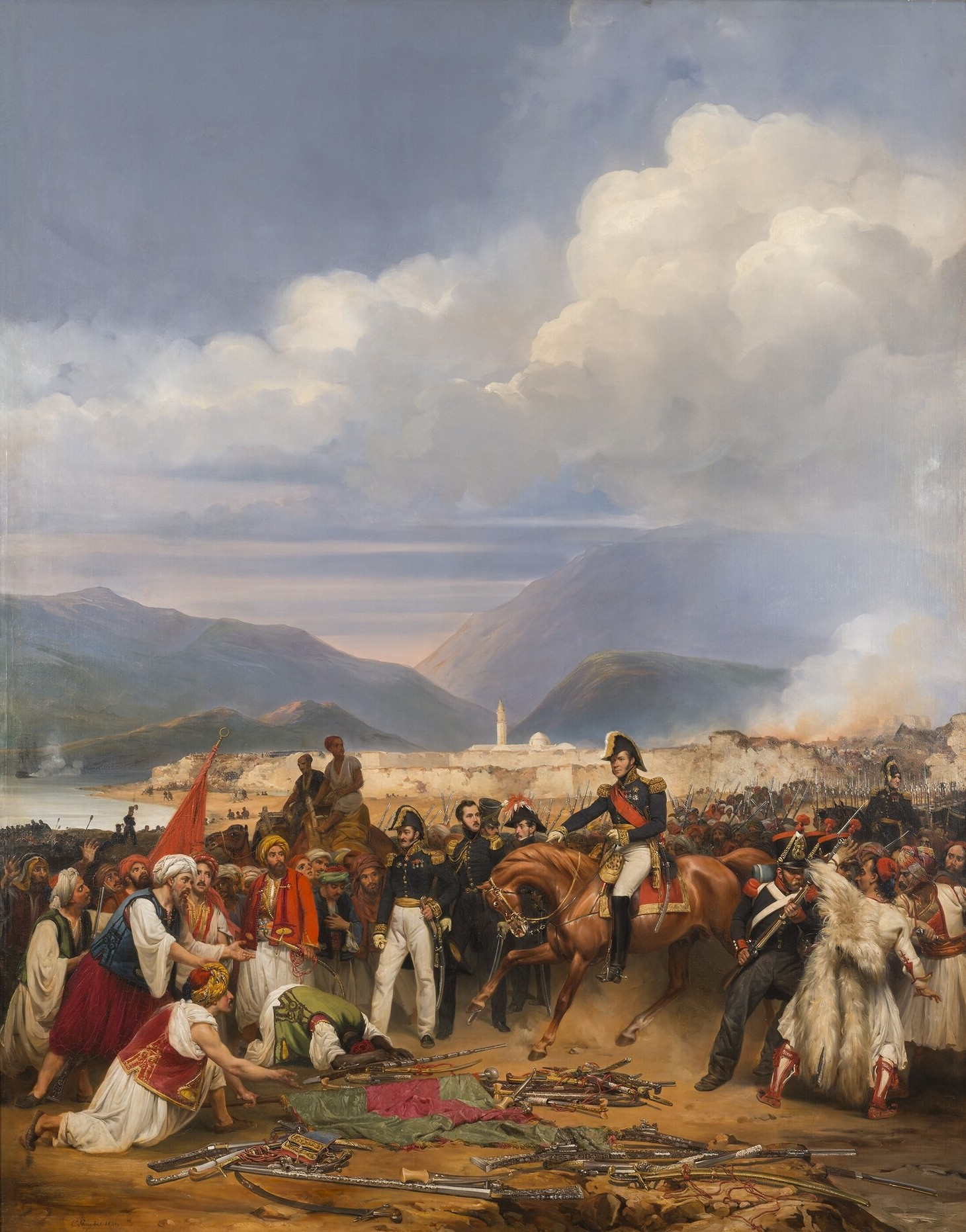
Surrender of the Castle of Morea of Patras to General Nicolas Joseph Maison (by Jean-Charles Langlois)

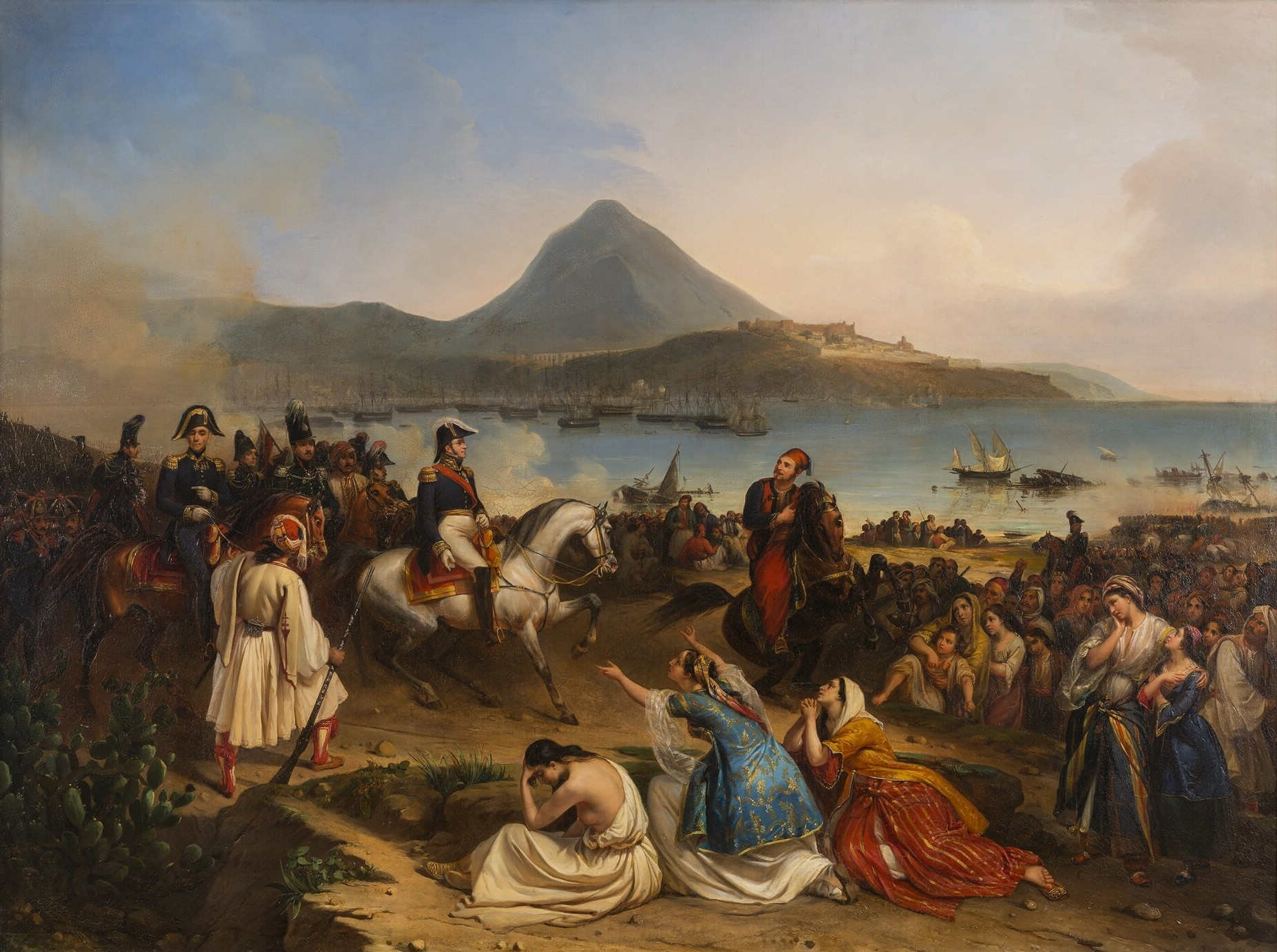
Meeting of General Maison and Ibrahim Pasha at Navarino in September 1828 (by Jean-Charles Langlois)

In 1828, he was given command of the French expeditionary corps in Morea (the Peloponnese peninsula in Greece). This expedition consisted in a land intervention of the French Army in the Peloponnese at the time of the Greek War of Independence, with the aim of liberating the region from the Turkish-Egyptian occupation forces commanded by Ibrahim Pasha. The military expedition was also accompanied by a scientific expedition mandated by the French Academy. After the soldiers took control of the principal strongholds held by the Turkish troops (Navarino, Modon, Coron and Patras), General Maison was created a Marshal of France by Charles X on 22 February 1829. Although he returned to France after 8 months, the French kept a military presence in the area until 1833. He left Greece on 22 May 1829.

== Later life ==
In 1830, Maison supported the July Revolution and served in November 1830 as Minister of Foreign Affairs for a couple of weeks, before being sent to Vienna as ambassador. In 1833 he was made ambassador to Russia in St. Petersburg. Maison served as minister of war from 30 April 1835 to 19 September 1836 after which he retired from public life.

Nicolas-Joseph Maison died in Paris on 13 February 1840. He is buried in the Père Lachaise Cemetery (division 5).

== Honors, military grades and decorations ==
- Name engraved on the Arc de Triomphe (Eastern pillar, Column 13 and 14).
- Ennoblement:
  - Baron of the Empire (2 July 1808).
  - Count of the Empire (14 August 1813).
  - Marquess (31 July 1817).
- Successive military grades:
  - National Guard: Grenadier, Corporal, Sergeant major, then Captain.
  - Army: Captain on 1 August 1792, Battalion commander (6 July 1796 provisionally, 16 August definitively), Adjutant general brigade chief on 3 July 1799, General of brigade on 10 February 1806, then Divisional general on 21 August 1812.
- Dignities:
  - Peer of France on 4 June 1817.
  - Marshal of France on 22 February 1829.
- French decorations:
  - Commander of the Legion of Honor on 22 November 1808.
  - Grand Officer of the Legion of Honor on 28 September 1813.
  - Grand Cross of the Legion of Honor on 22 July 1814.
  - Grand Cross of the Order of the Reunion on 19 November 1813.
  - Grand Cross of the Order of Saint Louis on 30 September 1818.
- Foreign decorations:
  - Bavaria: Knight of the Military Order of Maximilian Joseph of Bavaria (1806).
  - Greece: Grand Cross of the Royal Order of the Redeemer (1834).
  - Spain: Knight Grand Cross of the Order of Charles III (1835).
  - Belgium: Grand Cordon of the Order of Leopold (1836).

== Political offices ==
Political offices
Preceded by Louis-Mathieu Molé	Minister of Foreign Affairs; 2 November 1830 – 17 November 1830	Succeeded by Horace François Bastien, baron Sébastiani
Preceded by Henri Gauthier, comte de Rigny	Minister of War; 30 April 1835 – 6 September 1836	Succeeded by Simon Bernard

== See also ==
- List of members of the Morea expedition (1828-1833)

== Bibliography ==
- Mullié, Charles (1852). "MAISON (NICOLAS-JOSEPH)". Biographie des célébrités militaires des armées de terre et de mer de 1789 à 1850 (in French). Paris: Poignavant et Compagnie.
- "Nicolas Joseph Maison", in Adolphe Robert and Gaston Cougny, Dictionnaire des parlementaires français (1789–1891), Bourloton, Paris, 1889.
