= Maréchal de camp =

French military rank during the Ancien régime

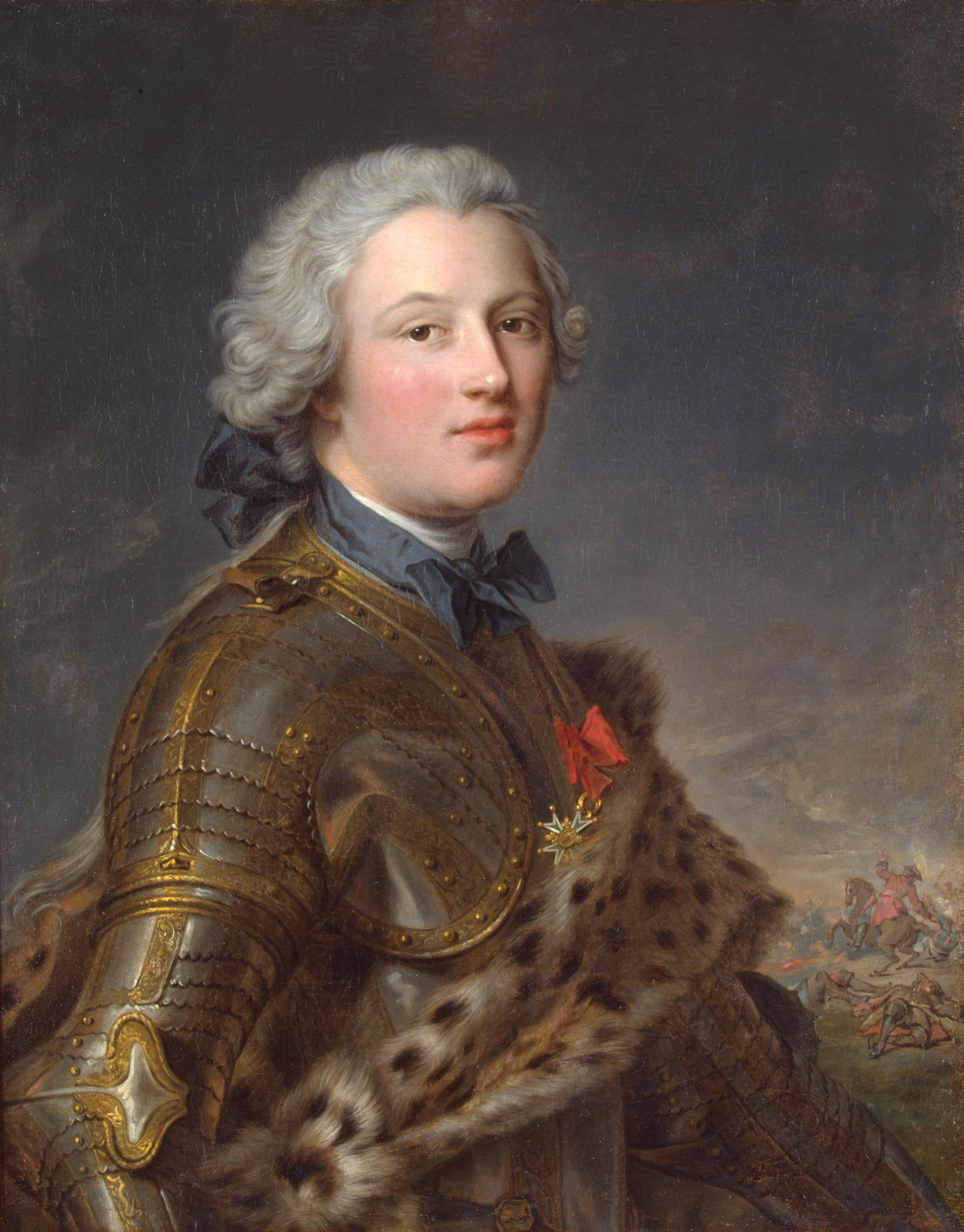
Pierre Victor, baron de Besenval de Brünstatt, a French Royal Army officer who was promoted to maréchal de camp in 1758

Maréchal de camp (sometimes incorrectly translated as field marshal) was a general officer rank used by the French Army until 1848.

The rank originated from the older rank of sergeant major general (French: sergent-major général). Sergeant major general was third in command in an army, after the general and the lieutenant general. One of his tasks was to dispose the troops on the battlefield. It was also known in the French army as the "battle sergeant" (fr: sergent de bataille). In English-speaking countries, the rank of sergeant major general became known as simply major general.

== Background and history ==
The maréchal de camp rank was the junior of the two officer general ranks of the French Army, the senior being lieutenant general. The rank of brigadier was intermediate between those of colonel and maréchal de camp, but was not considered a general officer rank. Nevertheless, when rank insignia were introduced in the 1770s, the brigadier insignia was one star on each epaulette, that of the maréchal de camp two stars. However the maréchal de camp was entitled a general's uniform, the brigadier des armées du roi still wore his regiment's uniform.

When the rank of brigadier was abolished in 1788, maréchals de camp assumed command of brigades in the French Army, but kept their two-star insignia. In 1793, during the French Revolution, the rank was renamed brigade general (général de brigade), as the brigade was its normal command. With the Bourbon Restoration in 1815, the rank of brigade general became once again maréchal de camp, but was changed back again to brigade general after the French Revolution of 1848.

== See also ==
- Mestre de camp
