= Lists of Légion d'honneur recipients =

The French government gives out the Legion of Honour awards, to both French and foreign nationals, based on a recipient's exemplary services rendered to France, or to the causes supported by France. This award is divided into five distinct categories (in ascending order), i.e. three ranks: Knight, Officer, Commander, and two titles: Grand Officer and Grand Cross. Knight is the most common and is awarded for either at least 20 years of public service or acts of military or civil bravery. The rest of the categories have a quota for the number of years of service in the category below before they can be awarded. The Office rank requires a minimum of eight years as a Knight, and the Commander, the highest civilian category for a non-French citizen, requires a minimum of five years as an Officer. The Grand Officer and the Grand Cross each require three years' service in their respective immediately lower rank. The awards are traditionally published and promoted on 14 July.

The following is a non-exhaustive list of recipients of the Legion of Honour awards, since the first ceremony in July 1804. 2,550 individuals can be awarded the insignia every year. The total number of awards is close to 1 million (estimated at 900,000 in 2021, including over 3,000 Grand Cross recipients), with some 92,000 recipients alive today. Only in 2008 was gender parity achieved amongst the yearly list of recipients, with the total number of women recipients since the award's establishment only reaching 59 at the end of the second French empire and only 26,000 in 2021.

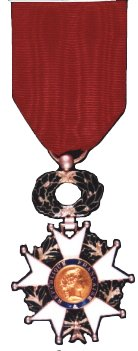

== Foreign recipients ==
- List of foreign recipients of the Légion d'Honneur by country
- List of foreign recipients of the Légion d'Honneur by decade
- List of British recipients of the Légion d'Honneur for the Crimean War
