= Siege of Pamplona =

Siege of Pamplona may refer to:

- Battle of Pampeluna (1521), a battle and siege in which Ignatius of Loyola was wounded
- Siege of Pamplona (1794), an operation during the War of the Pyrenees. The French besieged the city without being able to take it.
- Siege of Pamplona (1813), an operation during the Peninsular War
- Siege of Pamplona (1823), an action during the 1823 French invasion of Spain
- Siege of Pamplona (1874–1875), an incident near the end of the First Spanish Republic
