= Vincent Martel Deconchy =

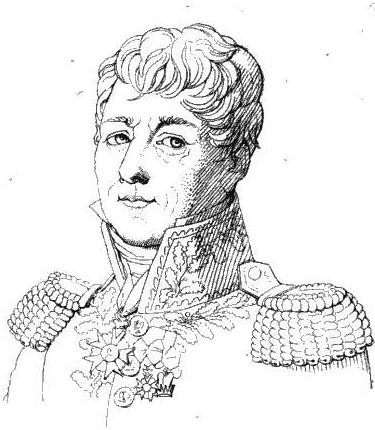
- Vincent Martel Deconchy
- Born: 21 January 1768; Guiscard, France
- Died: 26 August 1823 (aged 55) Pamplona, Spain
- Allegiance: France
- Branch: Infantry
- Rank: Lieutenant General
- Conflicts: French Revolutionary Wars; Battle of Neerwinden; Battle of Raismes; Battle of Castricum; Battle of Marengo; Battle of Pozzolo; Napoleonic Wars; Battle of Haslach; Battle of Durrenstein; Battle of Tamames; Siege of Ciudad Rodrigo; Siege of Almeida; Battle of Redinha; Battle of Salamanca; Battle of Tolosa; Battle of Caldiero; Battle of the Mincio; Spanish Expedition; Siege of Pamplona
- Awards: Légion d'Honneur, 1804; Order of the Iron Crown, 1813; Order of Saint Louis, 1814

Vincent Martel Deconchy (21 January 1768 – 26 August 1823) commanded a French brigade in Spain and Italy during the Napoleonic Wars. He joined the army in 1792 during the French Revolution and fought in several battles in the north. After being part of the force occupying the Batavian Republic, he gained promotion for heroism at the Battle of Castricum in 1799. He served as an aide-de-camp during the battles of Marengo and the Mincio in 1800.

Deconchy fought in several actions during the War of the Third Coalition. Transferred to Spain, he was acting commander of a light infantry regiment in the VI Corps for a time before being elevated to colonel in September 1810. He participated in the 1810 French invasion of Portugal and led his regiment at Redinha during the retreat. He was promoted general officer in February 1813 and fought against the Spanish guerillas. In August 1813 he transferred to Italy where he led a brigade in the army of Eugène de Beauharnais until the end of the fighting in 1814. He stayed in favor with the Bourbons and was elevated to the rank of lieutenant general in 1821. He led a division in the 1823 French intervention in Spain and died during the Siege of Pamplona.

== Portugal ==
In September 1810, Deconchy commanded 36 officers and 1,678 rank and file of the 1st and 2nd Battalions of the 25th Light Infantry. The unit was part of Martial Bardet de Maison-Rouge's brigade in Julien Augustin Joseph Mermet's division of Marshal Michel Ney's VI Corps.

== Spain ==
In the summer of 1813, Deconchy led a brigade of the Army of the North consisting of two battalions of the 64th Line Infantry Regiment, one battalion of the 22nd Line, four companies of the 34th Line and two companies of the 1st Line. With his 2,000-man brigade, Deconchy joined the 16,000 troops under Maximilien Sébastien Foy who were evacuating the northern coast of Spain due to the British victory at the Battle of Vitoria. After he received news of Vitoria, Foy waited at Bergara for his forces to join him before marching off at top speed for the French frontier. A column led by Sir Thomas Graham attempted to cut Foy off, but was foiled at the Battle of Tolosa on 26 June. During that action, Deconchy's brigade held the walls of the town and easily repelled two attacks by the 1st King's German Legion Light Battalion under Christian Friedrich Wilhelm von Ompteda. At sunset, Foy issued orders to withdraw and Deconchy's men got away just as the Allies smashed down the town gates with cannon fire. As he fell back toward France, Foy sent Deconchy's brigade and every artillerist he could spare to defend San Sebastián which was commanded by Louis Emmanuel Rey. The new troops replaced the previous unreliable garrison of gendarmes and recruits which were sent off as an escort for a large column of refugees.
