= French invasion of Spain =

French invasion of Spain may refer to:

- Napoleonic invasion of Spain
- Hundred Thousand Sons of Saint Louis, French invasion in 1823
