= Battle of Trocadero =

1823 conflict in France's Spanish Expedition

- Part of the Spanish Expedition
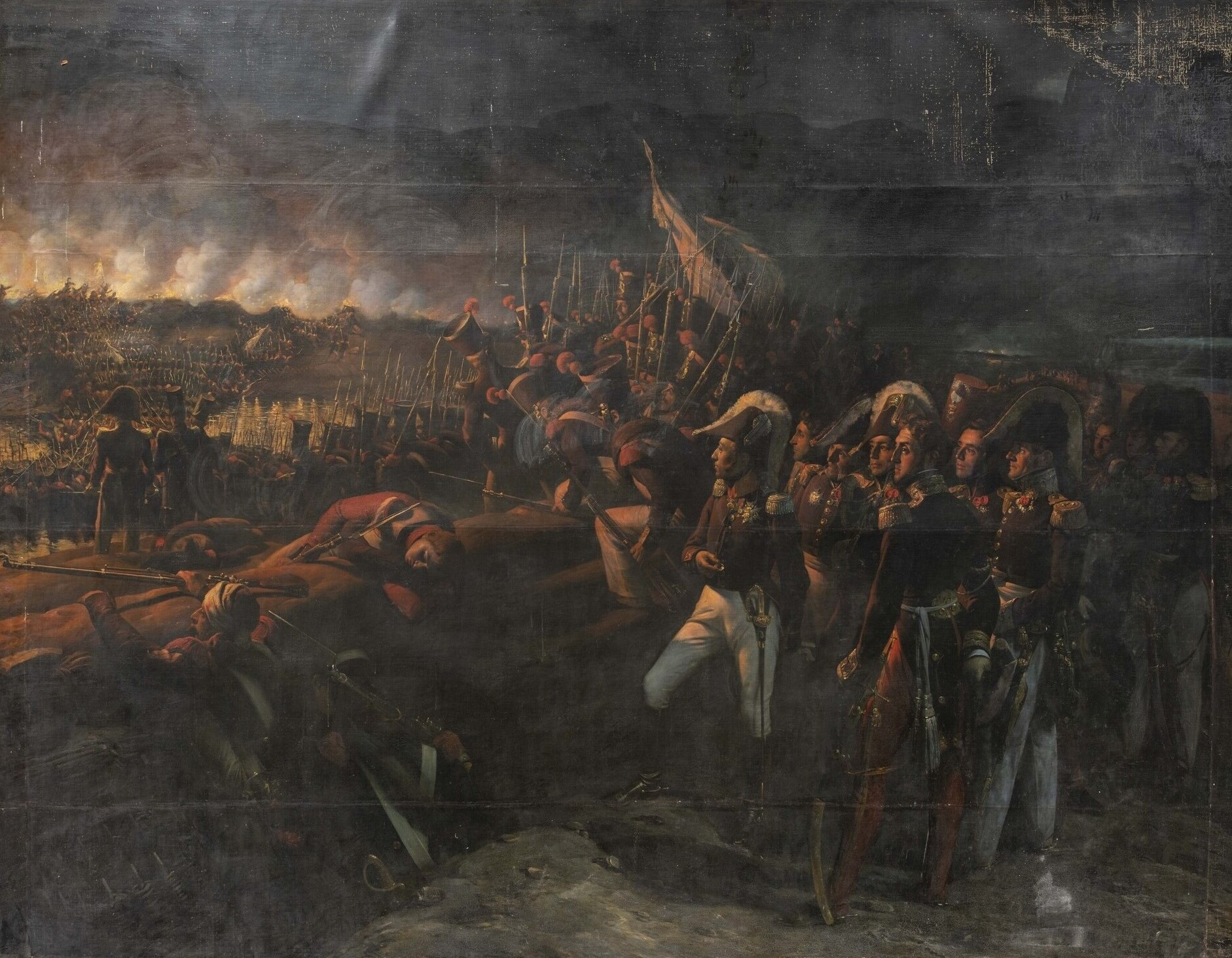
- Capture of Trocadero by the Duke of Angoulême, August 31, 1823; Paul Delaroche, 1824
Date	31 August 1823
Location	Cádiz, Kingdom of Spain(Savoy)
Result	French and Spanish Royalist victory

Belligerents
Kingdom of France (Spain) Ejército de la Fe	(Spain) Partisans of the Cortes

Commanders and leaders
(Kingdom of France) Louis Antoine, Duke of Angoulême	(Spain) Colonel Garcés

Strength
30,000 soldiers	1,700 soldiers

Casualties and losses
31 dead 110 wounded	150 dead 300 wounded 1,000 captured

The Battle of Trocadero, fought on 31 August 1823, was a significant battle in France's expedition in support of the Spanish King Ferdinand VII. The French defeated the Spanish liberal forces and restored Ferdinand to absolute rule.

== Prelude ==
After the downfall of Napoleon, King Ferdinand VII of Spain refused to adopt the liberal Spanish Constitution of 1812 and in 1820 faced a rebellion in favour of a constitutional monarchy, led by Rafael del Riego y Nuñez. On March 10, 1820, in the Plaza de San Juan de Dios in Cádiz, Royalist absolutist troops carried out a massacre against those of the population of Cádiz who supported the liberals and were celebrating the proclamation of the Constitution of 1812.

The King was captured and detained at Cádiz. Alarmed by these events, the other European powers convened in October 1822 at the Congress of Verona and authorized France to intervene in the conflict and restore the rule of Ferdinand, with only Britain abstaining from that decision.

== Military intervention ==
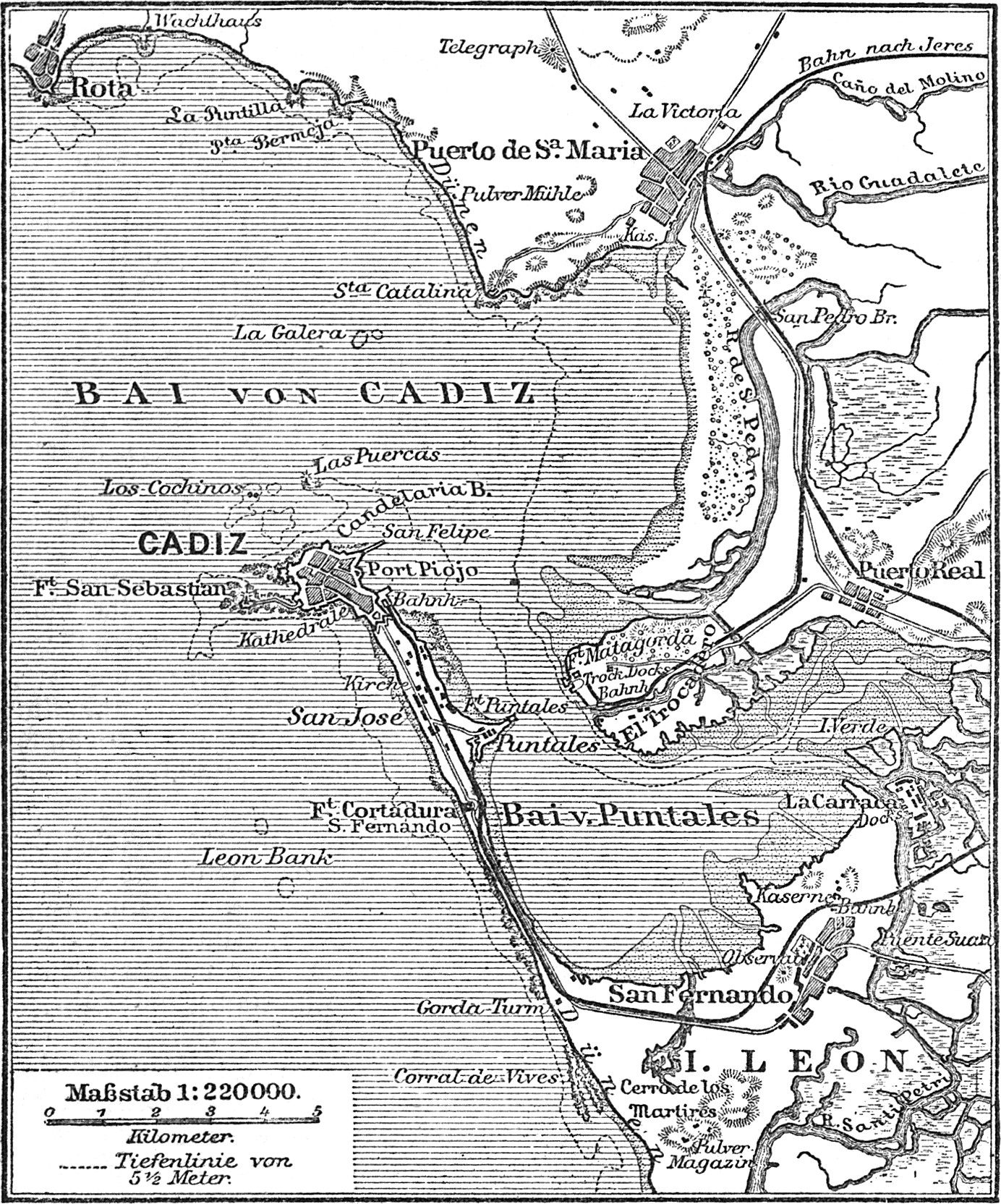
Location of Trocadero in the Bay of Cádiz (1890)

On 17 April 1823, French forces led by Louis-Antoine, Duke of Angoulême, son of the future Charles X, crossed the Pyrenees into Spain.

The French forces were welcomed by the Basques and conservative Spaniards. The Duke dispatched a force to besiege San Sebastián while he launched an attack on Madrid, held by the rebel government, which on 23 May withdrew to Seville. Madrid's military commander secretly surrendered and fled to France, and the leaderless Madrid garrison could not keep out the French, who seized the city and installed a regent, pending Ferdinand's expected return.

The French moved south to deal with the rebels at Cádiz, and besieged the fort of Trocadero, which controlled access to the city. On 31 August 1823 they launched a surprise bayonet attack from the sea side, taking advantage of the low tide, and took the fort. After this action, French infantry captured the Trocadero village by a flank attack. After this last action, 1700 Spanish soldiers were captured by the French.

Cádiz itself held out for three weeks despite bombardments, but was forced to surrender on 23 September 1823 and King Ferdinand was released and handed over to the French. Despite a prior promise of amnesty, the King ordered reprisals against the rebels; in the following years, an estimated 30,000 people were executed and 20,000 imprisoned.

== Aftermath ==
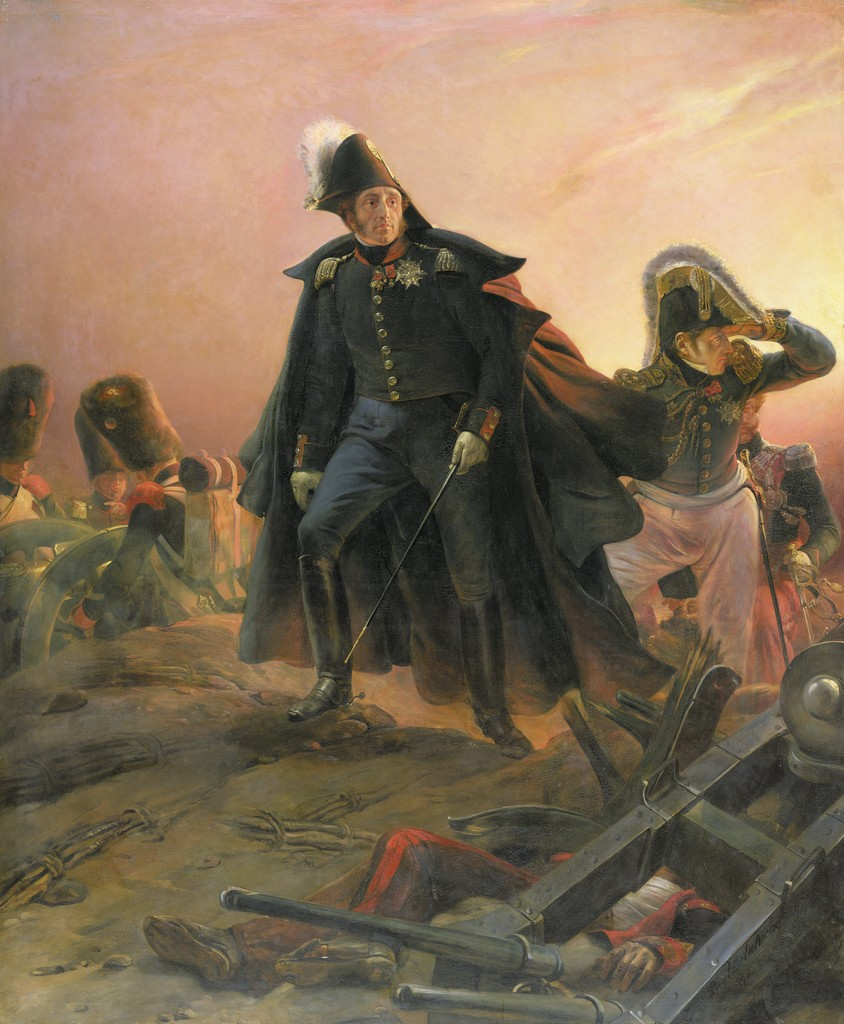
The Duke of Angoulême at the Taking of Trocadero by Paul Delaroche, 1828

The Battle of Trocadero was one of the events that prompted U.S. President James Monroe to proclaim what would become known as the Monroe Doctrine on 2 December 1823, to safeguard the Americas against intervention by European powers.

The fall of Trocadero was commemorated in Paris, with the Trocadéro, where the city was expanding to the edges of the Bois de Boulogne. Louis-Antoine, Duke of Angoulême, the victor of the battle, was offered the title "Prince of Trocadero" by the Spanish king, but he refused to accept it, partly in disgust at Ferdinand going back on his promises of clemency.

In Les Misérables, Victor Hugo devoted several paragraphs to the battle (Volume II, Book 2, chapter 3), in which he called the battle "a fine military action", but also said that "[t]he war of 1823 was an outrage on the generous Spanish nation, (..) at the same time, an outrage on the French Revolution."

== See also ==
- Siege of Pamplona (1823), one of the other major actions of the war
