= Jacques Lauriston =

French soldier and diplomat (1768–1828)

Jacques Alexandre Bernard Law de Lauriston
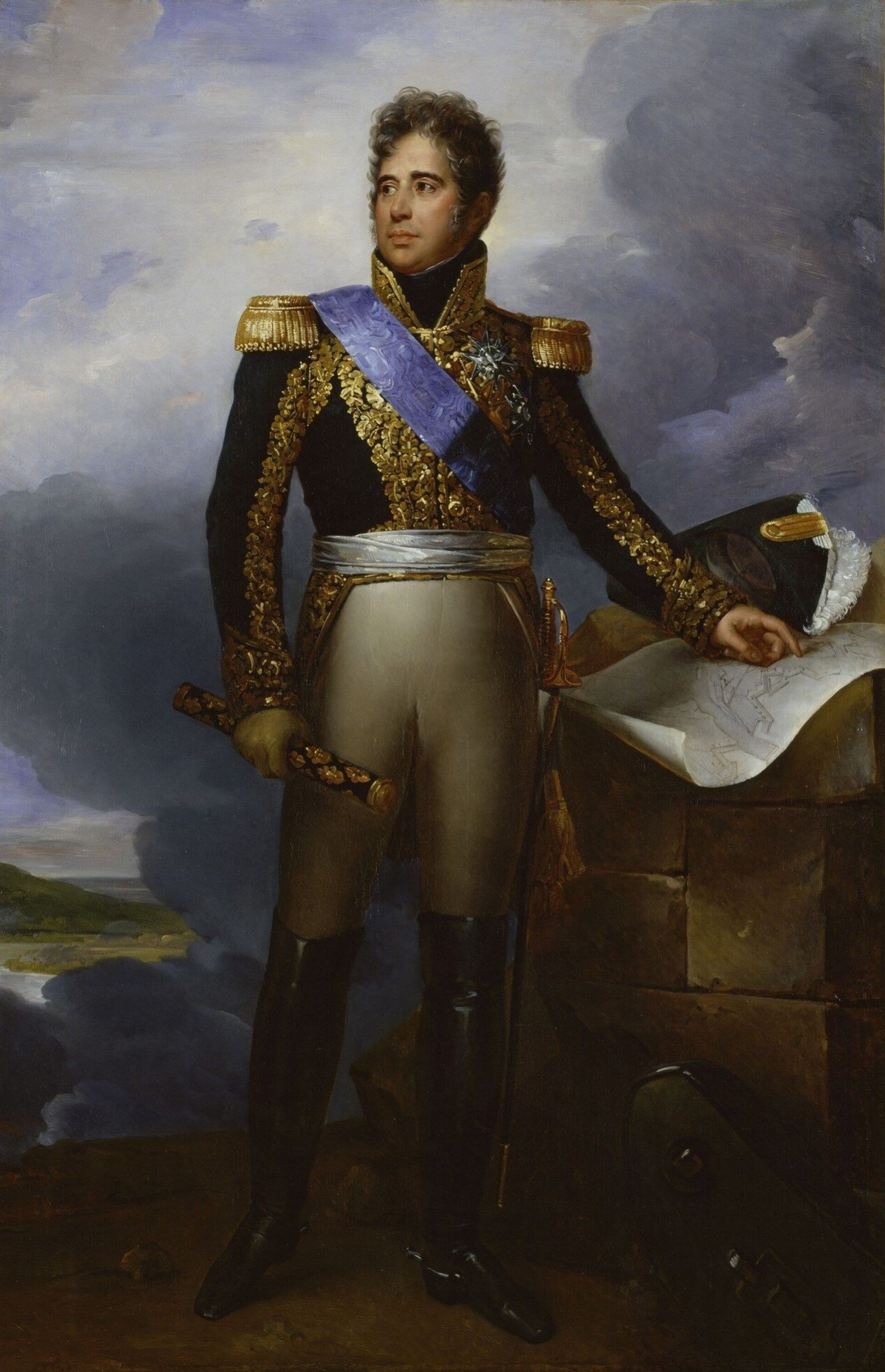
- Portrait by Marie-Éléonore Godefroid, 1824
- Born: 1 February 1768; Pondicherry, French India
- Died: 12 June 1828 (aged 60) Paris, France
- Allegiance: Kingdom of France; Kingdom of the French; French First Republic; First French Empire; Bourbon Restoration
- Branch: Artillery, staff
- Service years: 1786–1828
- Rank: Marshal of France
- Conflicts: French Revolutionary Wars; Napoleonic Wars; Siege of Ragusa (1806); Hundred Thousand Sons of Saint Louis; Siege of Pamplona (1823)
- Awards: Légion d'Honneur; Order of Saint-Louis
- Other work: Diplomat

Jacques Alexandre Bernard Law, marquis de Lauriston (French pronunciation: [ʒak alɛksɑ̃dʁ bɛʁnaʁ lo]; 1 February 1768 – 12 June 1828) was a French soldier and diplomat of Scottish and Portuguese descent, and a general officer in the French Army during the Napoleonic Wars. He was born in Pondicherry in French India, where his father, Jean Law de Lauriston, was Governor-General. Jean Law de Lauriston was a nephew of the financier John Law. Jacques' mother was a member of the Carvallho family of Portuguese traders.

Lauriston Castle, in Scotland, was inherited by John Law in 1729. Lauriston is one of the names inscribed on the Arc de Triomphe.

== Early career ==
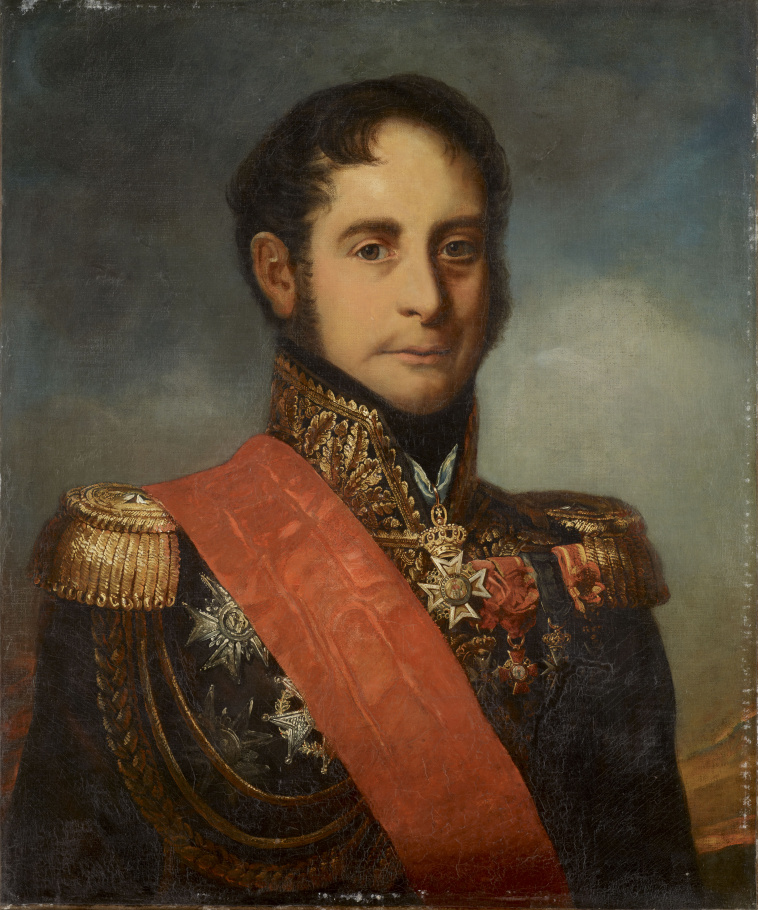
Portrait of Jacques Lauriston by François Gérard

Lauriston obtained his first commission about 1786, served with the artillery and on the general staff during the early campaigns of the Revolution, and became brigadier of artillery in 1795. Resigning in 1796, he was brought back into the service in 1800 as aide-de-camp to Napoleon, with whom, as a cadet, Lauriston had been on friendly terms. In the years immediately preceding the first empire, Lauriston was, successively, director of the La Fère artillery school and special envoy to Denmark before being selected to convey to England the ratification of the Peace of Amiens in 1802.

In 1805, having risen to the rank of general of division, he took part in the war against Austria. He occupied Venice and the Republic of Ragusa in 1806, was made governor-general of Venice in 1807, took part in the Erfurt negotiations of 1808, was ennobled as a count, and served with the emperor during the Peninsular War in Spain (1808–1809), where he commanded the division that besieged and won Pamplona. He fought under Viceroy Eugène de Beauharnais at the Battle of Raab in the Italian campaign and the subsequent advance to Vienna.

== Fame and high command ==
At the Battle of Wagram on 6 July 1809, Napoleon ordered Lauriston to form a grand battery to stop the surprise Austrian attack against his left flank. To provide time, the emperor directed General Étienne Marie Antoine Champion de Nansouty's heavy cavalry to charge. While Nansouty's cuirassiers and carabiniers sacrificed themselves in futile attacks on the Austrians, Lauriston assembled 112 artillery pieces for his huge battery. He gathered all 60 guns from the Imperial Guard, 24 guns from General Karl Philipp von Wrede's Bavarian division, and 38 pieces from Eugène's Army of Italy. He advanced the batteries into grapeshot range, unlimbered the guns, and opened fire. In the face of this terrific blizzard of lead, the Austrian III Armeekorps of General Johann Kollowrat halted and edged back out of the firing range. The barrage allowed time for Napoleon to organize a successful counterattack.

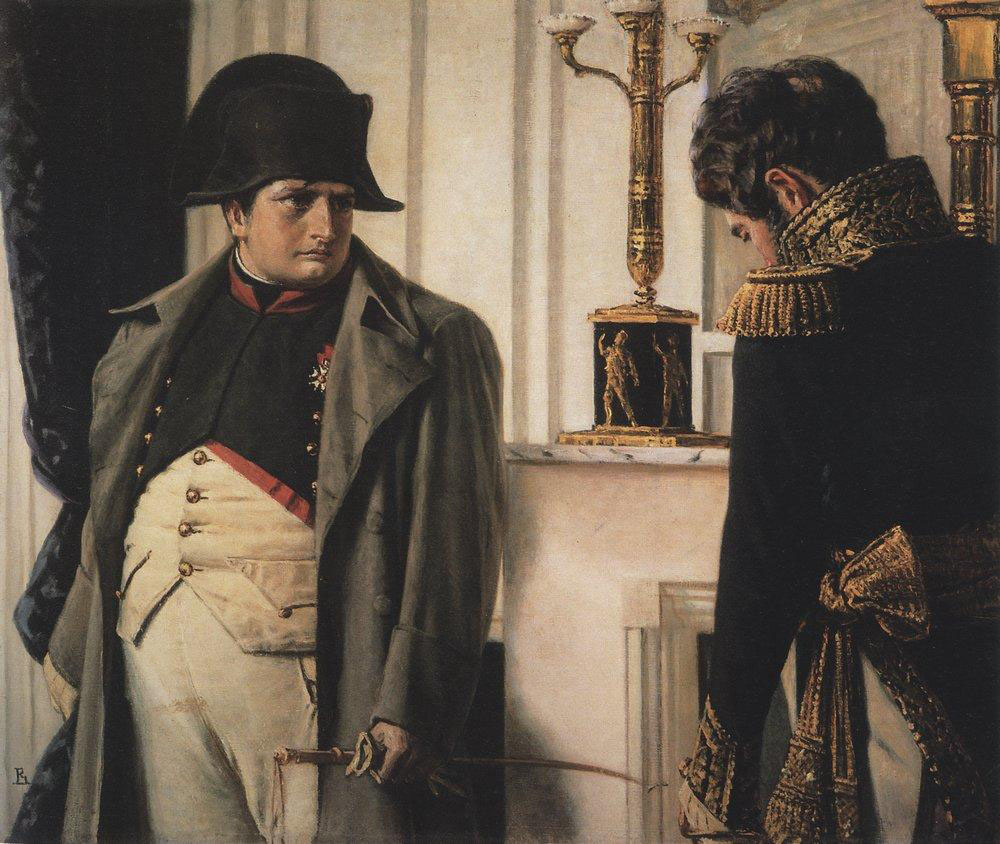
Napoleon and Lauriston in Moscow – an unflattering painting by Vasily Vereshchagin, representing a Russian point of view

In 1811, Lauriston was made ambassador to Russia. In 1812, he held a command in the Grande Armée and gained distinction through his firmness in covering the retreat from Moscow. He commanded the V Corps at Lützen and Bautzen during the German campaign, but was captured during the disastrous retreat after the Battle of Leipzig in October 1813.

Lauriston was held as a prisoner of war until the fall of the empire. He then joined King Louis XVIII of France, to whom he remained faithful during the Hundred Days. His reward was a seat in the Chamber of Peers and a command in the Royal Guard. In 1817, he was created a marquis, and became commandant supérieur of the Département du Finistère et de la place de Brest. In 1823, Lauriston was made a Marshal of France and he commanded a corps during the Spanish expedition. He died of a stroke in Paris on 11 June 1828. The name LAURISTON is inscribed on Column 13 of the Arc de Triomphe.
