= The Duke of Angoulême at the Taking of Trocadero =

Painting by Paul Delaroche

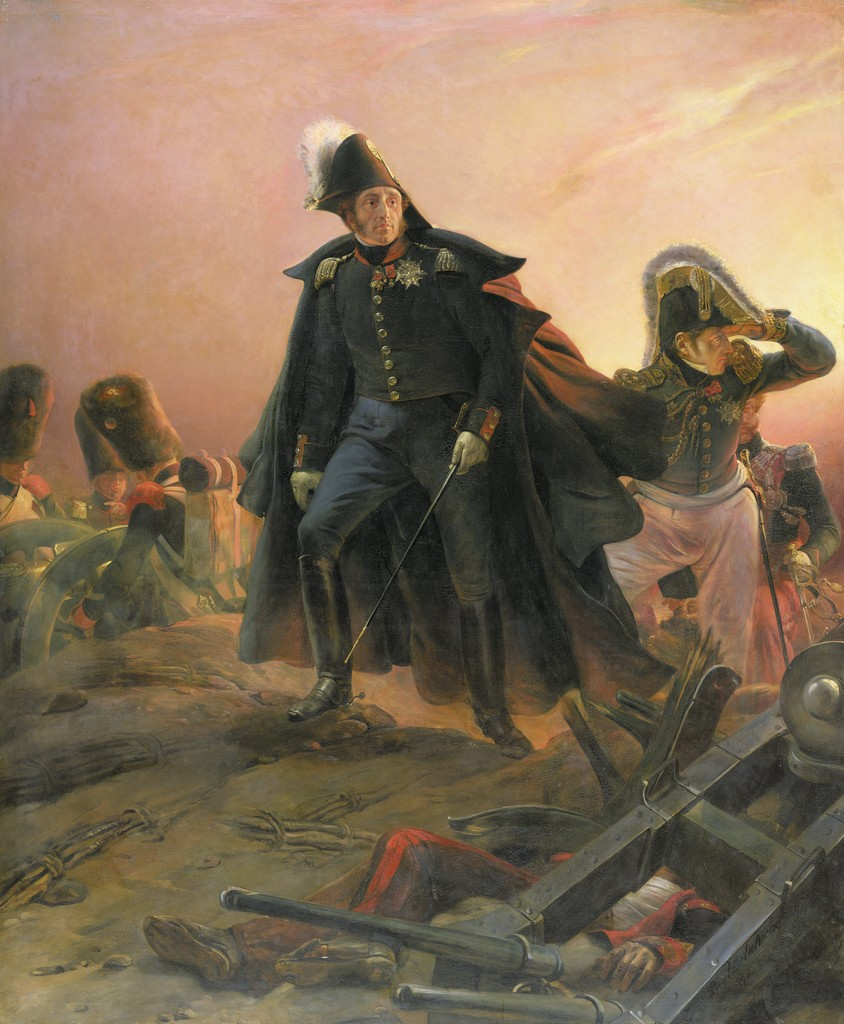
- Artist: Paul Delaroche
- Year: 1828
- Type: Oil on canvas, history painting
- Dimensions: 317.5 cm × 259 cm (125.0 in × 102 in)
- Location: Palace of Versailles, Versailles

The Duke of Angoulême at the Taking of Trocadero (French: Le Duc d'Angoulême à la prise du Trocadero) is an 1828 oil-on-canvas painting by the French painter Paul Delaroche. Combining elements of portraiture and history painting, it shows Louis Antoine, Duke of Angoulême during the Battle of Trocadero on 31 August 1823.

Angoulême was the nephew of Louis XVIII and second-in-line to the throne after his own father Charles. In 1823 he led the Hundred Thousand Sons of Saint Louis, a French military intervention in Spain to support the Ferdinand VII. Ferdinand, a fellow Bourbon monarch, had been seized and forced to implement measures he opposed by the Liberal government. Angoulême's forces made swift progress and the Spanish government retreated to the port of Cádiz with Ferdinand in its custody. Under Angoulême's command the French stormed the key fort at Trocadero. Cádiz fell a month later and the Spanish insurgents released Ferdinand to Angoulême.

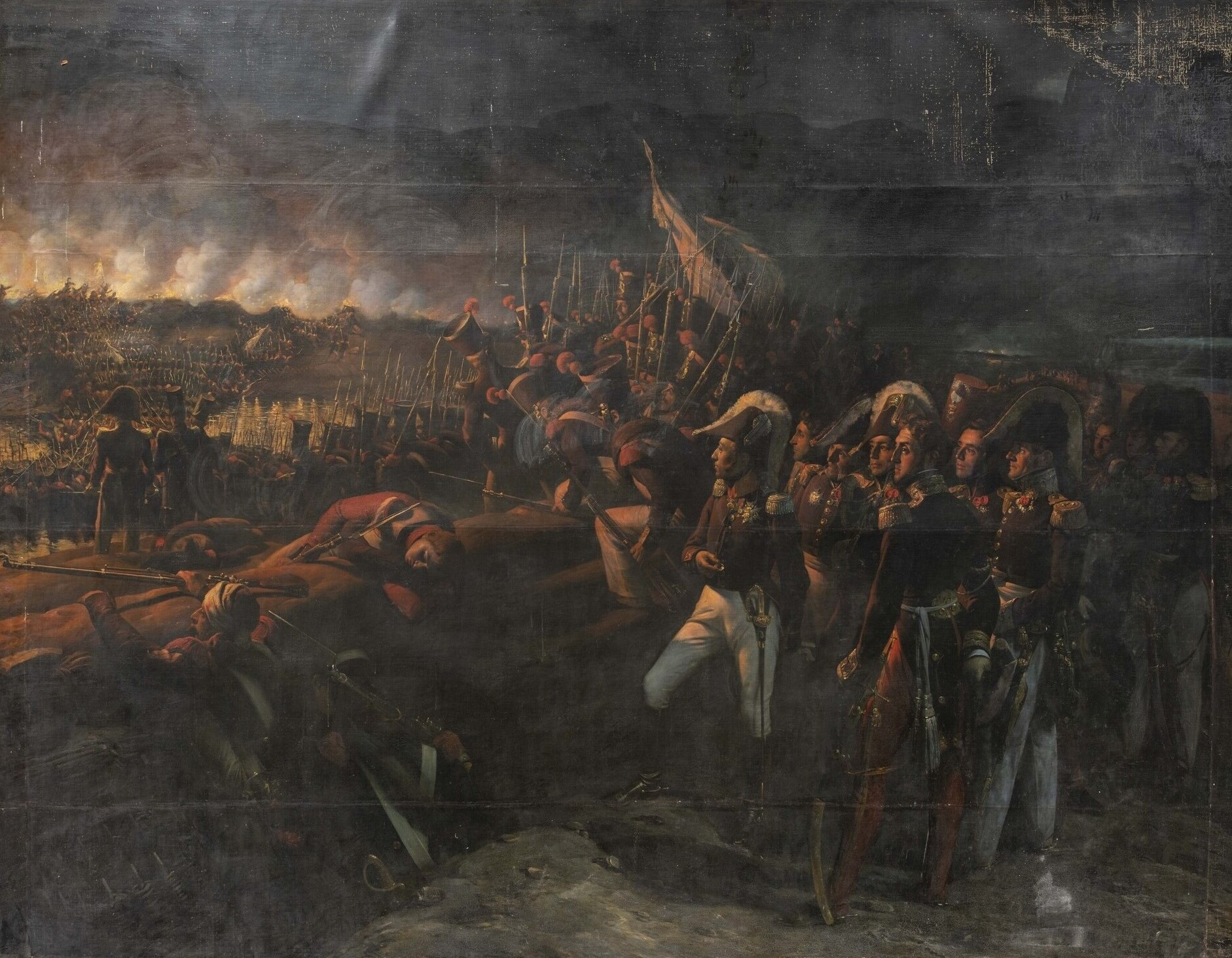
Capture of the Trocadero by Delaroche, 1826–27. The work that inspired this portrait.

Delaroche received a commission from the French government to focus on Angoulême's military success in Spain. Antoine-Jean Gros was originally selected to produce a work on the Trocadero before he was replaced by Delaroche, who he was best known for producing more distantly historical works. By the time it was completed Angoulême was Dauphin of France and heir to his father Charles X. Delaroche produced a large-scale battle scene with Angoulême and senior commanders prominent on right. It was exhibited at the Paris Salon in 1827, overshadowing other works by the artist. It led directly to the commissioning of this second large-scale work directly focusing on the Duke. It was a success, acclaimed for "achieving resemblance more happily than any other artist". The composition has some similarities to fellow artist Delacroix's Greece on the Ruins of Missolonghi. Today it is in the collection of the Palace of Versailles.

== Bibliography ==
- Bann, Stephen. Paul Delaroche: History Painted. Reaktion Books, 1997.
- Hornstein, Katie. Picturing War in France, 1792–1856. Yale University Press, 2018.
- Jarrett, Mark. The Congress of Vienna and Its Legacy: War and Great Power Diplomacy After Napoleon. I.B. Tauris, 2013.
- Potter, Matthew C. (ed) Representing the Past in the Art of the Long Nineteenth Century: Historicism, Postmodernism, and Internationalism. Taylor & Francis, 2021.
