= Isla del Trocadero =

Spanish island

Coordinates: 36°31′N 6°13′W

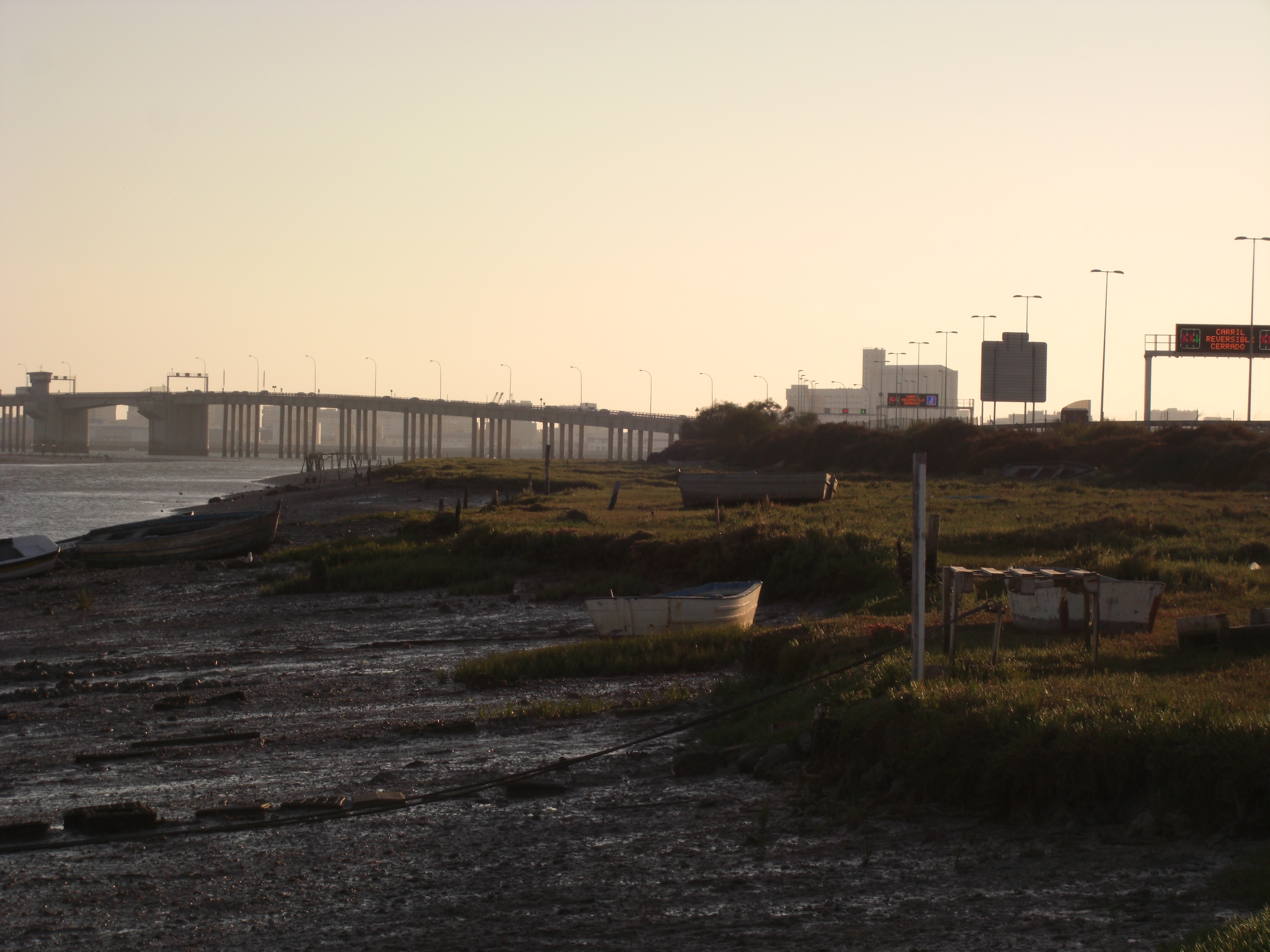
View of Trocadero Island and Carranza Bridge

Isla del Trocadero (lit. 'trader's island') is an island in the Bay of Cádiz, in Andalusia, Spain.

== Situation ==
The island has an area of 5.25 km^{2} (2.03 sq mi) and lies in the southern part of the Bay of Cádiz, southwest of Puerto Real village.

The north of the island is crossed by Spanish national highway N443, which goes from Puerto Real to Cádiz. The industrial area Polígono El Trocadero and the ramp in the national highway named El Trocadero refer to the direct proximity of the island.

== History ==
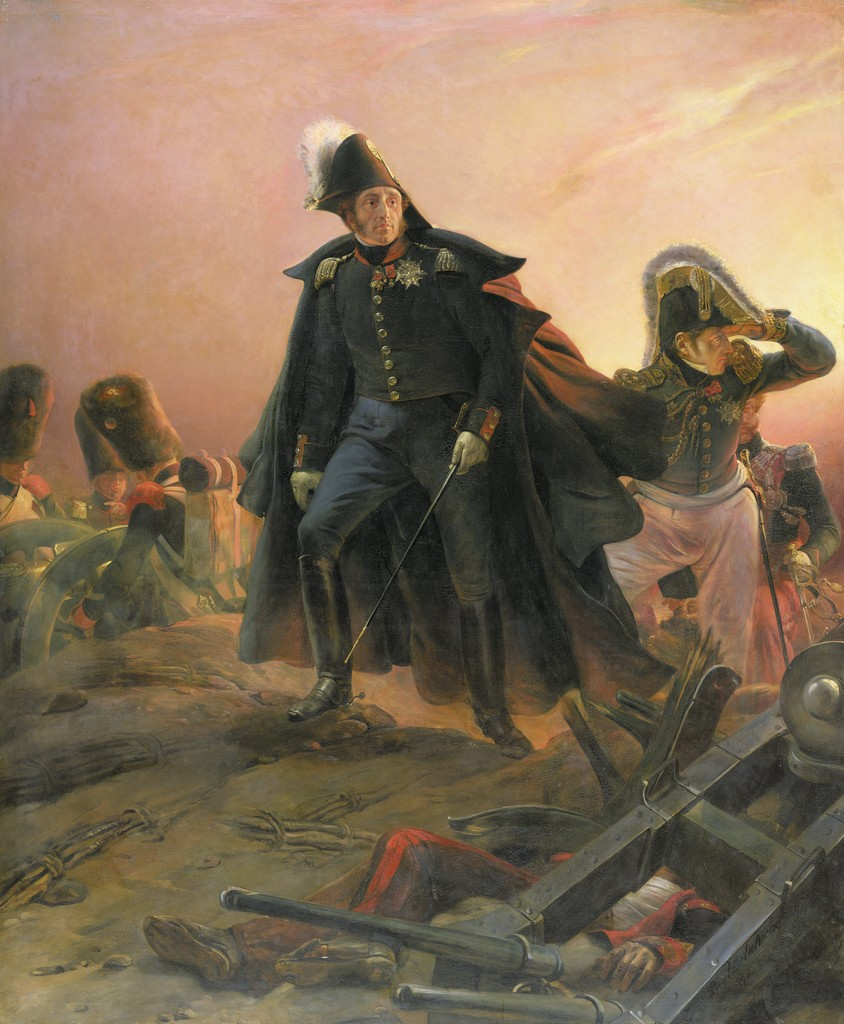
The Duke of Angoulême at the Taking of Trocadero by Paul Delaroche

The island has been an important commercial traffic point for a long time, hence its name. It was also used to repair ships. The San Luis Fort, in the Southern tip of the island, was used as part of the defences of the Bay of Cádiz.

The fort, currently in ruins, was captured by French troops during the Battle of Trocadero, on 31 August 1823. This lends name to the Trocadéro area in the 16th arrondissement of Paris, which featured the Palais du Trocadéro in the 19th century, and in celebration of which the London Trocadero was named a few years later.

== Protected area ==
The Isla del Trocadero belongs to large protected area and a natural park, with an extension of 100 km^{2} (39 sq mi). The area is an important wetland biotope and landing zone for migratory birds.

== Access to the island ==
The island can be accessed by the ports of Puerto Real and Matagorda. It is particularly interesting for bird watching.
