= Carle Vernet =

French painter (1758–1836)

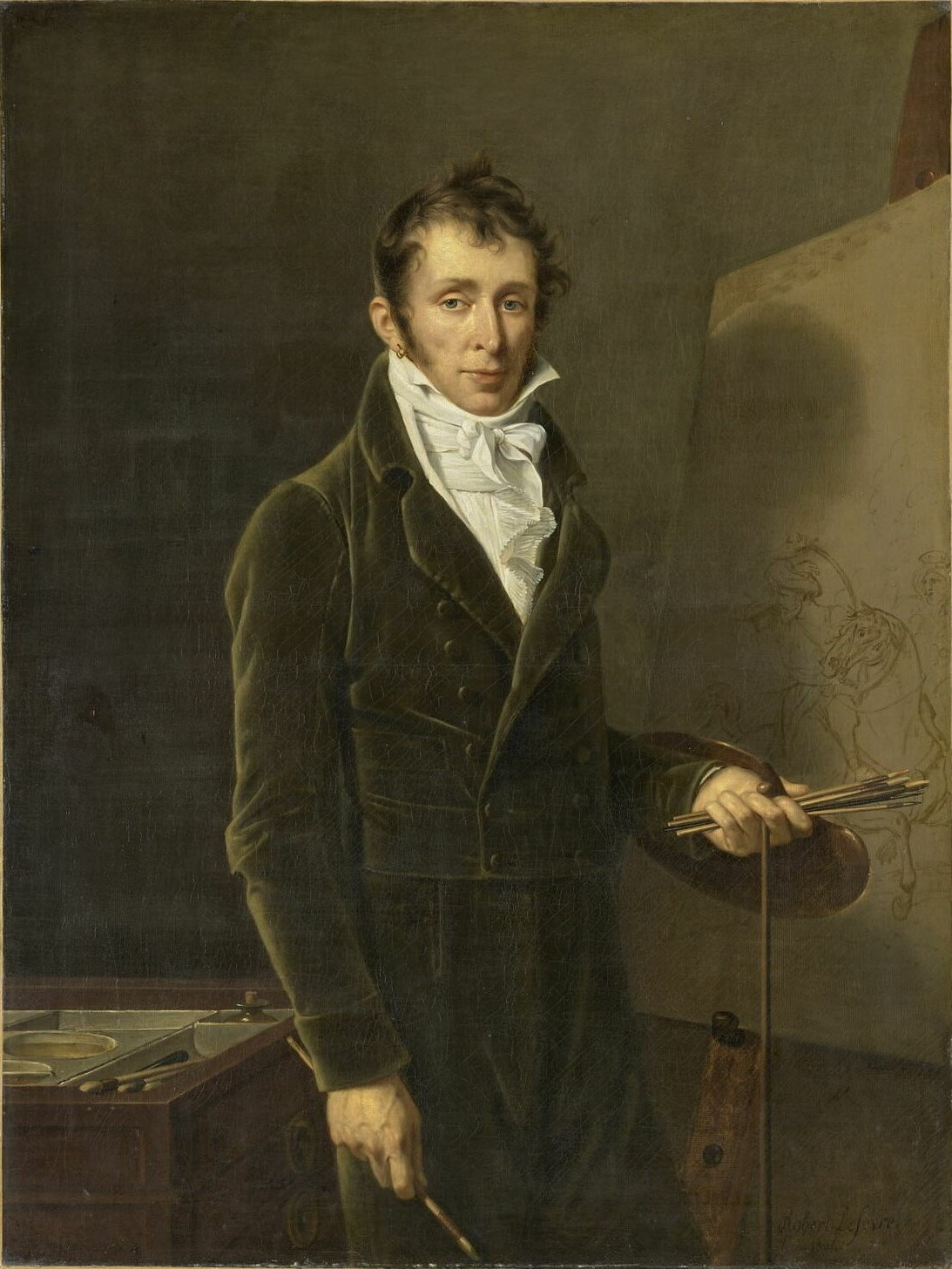
- Portrait of Carle Vernet by Robert Lefèvre, 1804
- Born: Antoine Charles Horace Vernet; 14 August 1758; Bordeaux, France
- Died: 27 November 1836 (aged 78); Paris, France
- Occupation: Painting
- Children: Horace Vernet
- Father: Claude-Joseph Vernet

Antoine Charles Horace Vernet (French pronunciation: [kaʁl vɛʁnɛ]; 14 August 1758 – 27 November 1836), better known as Carle Vernet, was a French painter, the youngest child of painter Claude-Joseph Vernet and the father of painter Horace Vernet.

== Biography ==
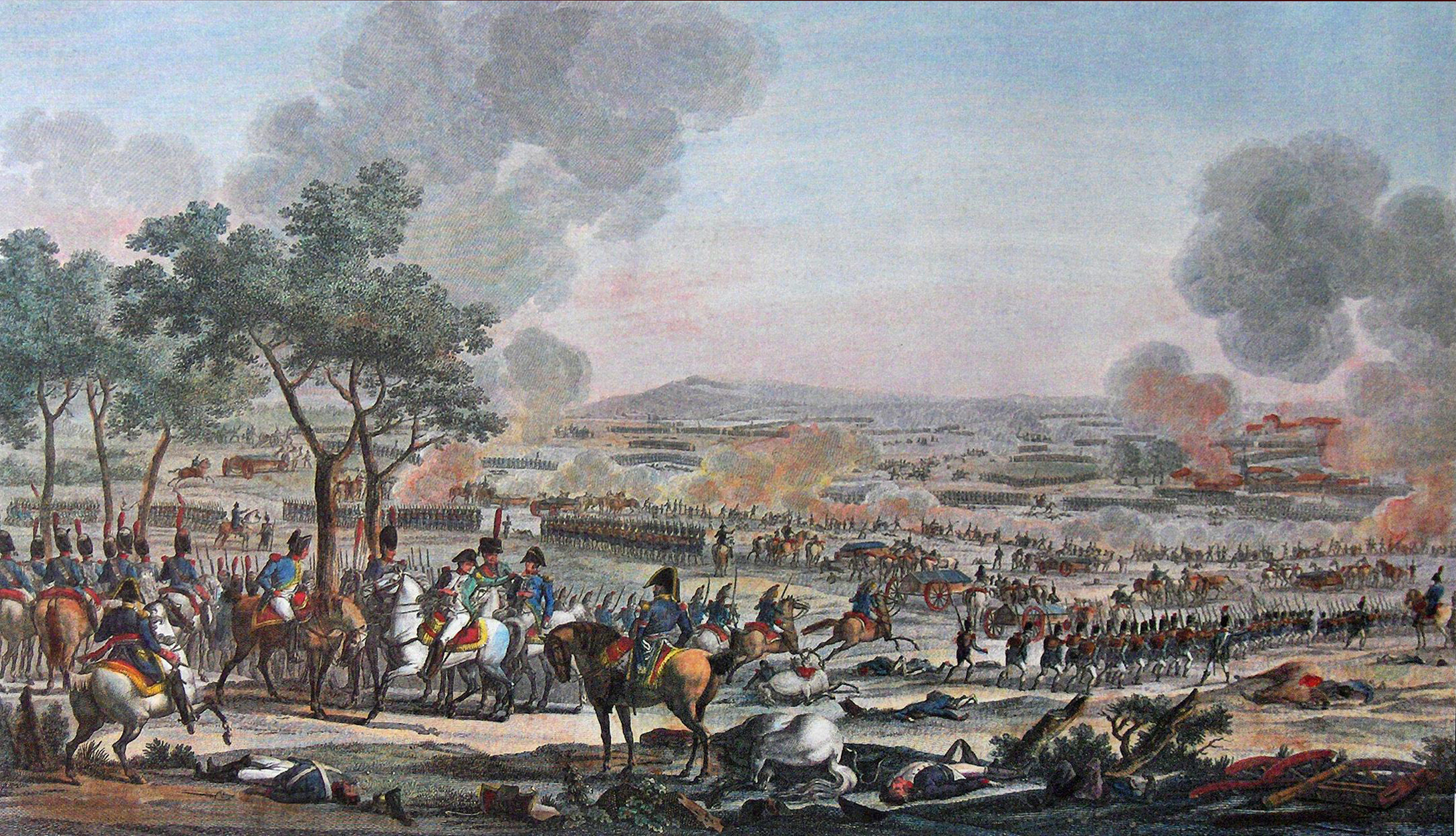
The Battle of Wagram; colored lithograph by Carle Vernet and Jacques Swebach

Vernet was born in Bordeaux. At the age of five, he showed an extraordinary passion for drawing horses, but went through the regular academic course as a pupil of his father and of Nicolas-Bernard Lépicié. Strangely, after winning the Prix de Rome (1782), he seemed to lose interest in the occupation, and his father had to recall him from Rome to prevent his entering a monastery.

In his "Triumph of Aemilius Paulus", Vernet broke with tradition and drew the horse with the forms he had learnt from nature in stables and riding schools. His hunting pieces, races, landscapes, and work as a lithographer were also very popular.

Carle's sister was executed by the guillotine during the Revolution. After this, he gave up art.

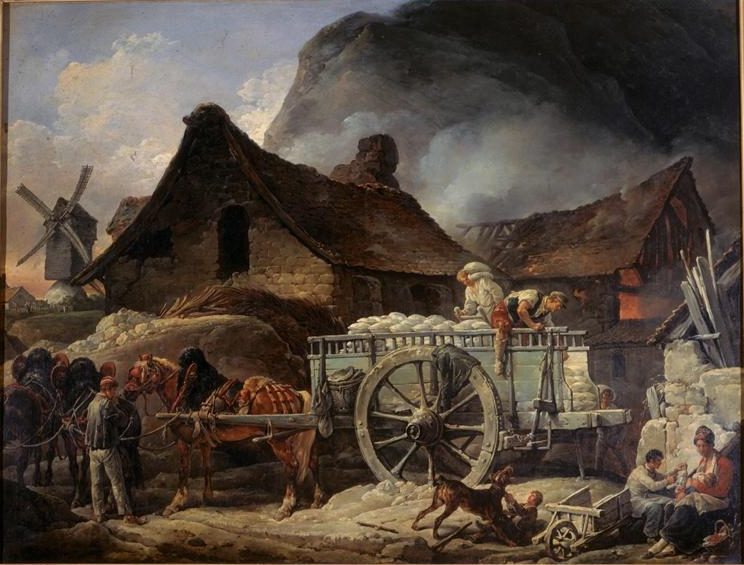
The Plaster Kiln at Montmartre

When he again began to produce under the French Directory (1795–1799), his style had changed radically. He started drawing in minute detail battles and campaigns to glorify Napoleon. His drawings of Napoleon's Italian campaign won acclaim as did the Battle of Marengo, and for his Morning of Austerlitz Napoleon awarded him the Legion of Honour, and Louis XVIII awarded him the Order of Saint Michael. Afterwards he excelled in hunting scenes and depictions of horses.

He produced a painting Capture of Pamplona celebrating the 1823 Siege of Pamplona which he exhibited at the Paris Salon of 1824.

In addition to being a painter and lithographer, Carle Vernet was an avid horseman. Just days before his death at the age of seventy-eight, he was seen racing as if he were a sprightly young man.

He died in Paris.

== Literary references ==
In Maria Wirtemberska's novel Malvina, or the Heart's Intuition (1816; English translation 2001, by Ursula Phillips), it is said that a view that is being described merits the talent of Vernet, who as the writer explains in her own footnote was a sea painter.

== Selected works ==
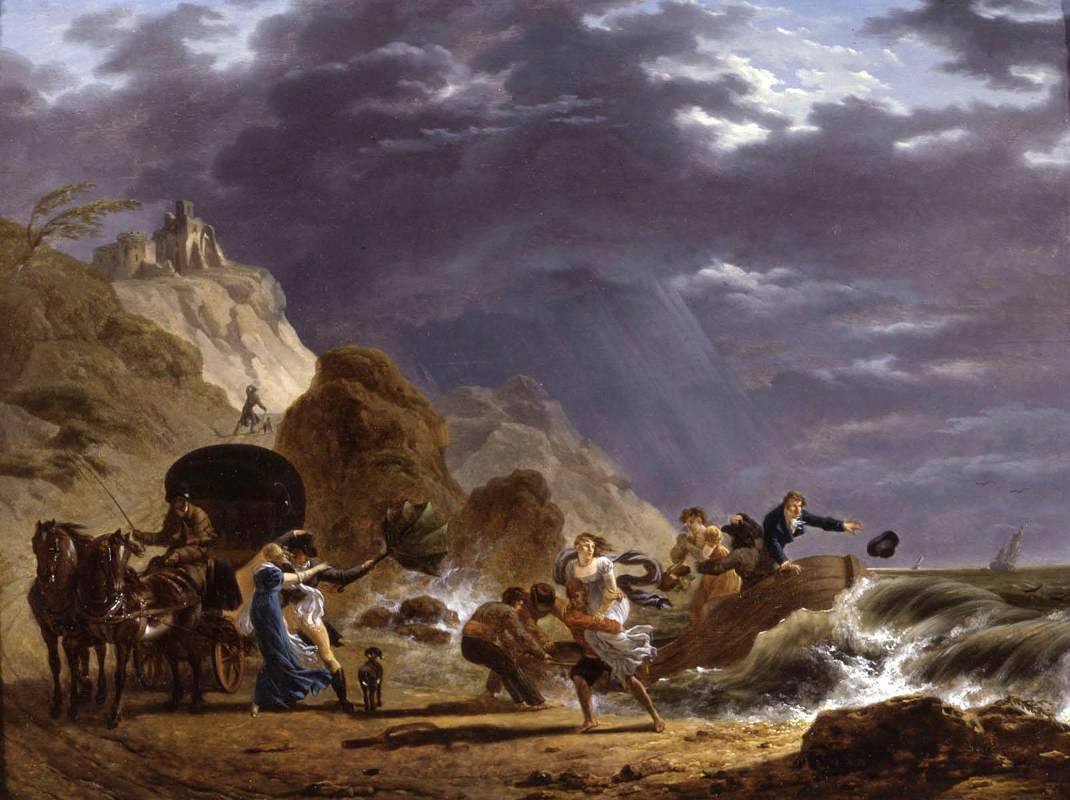
Arrival of Emigres on the French Coast with the Duchess of Berry

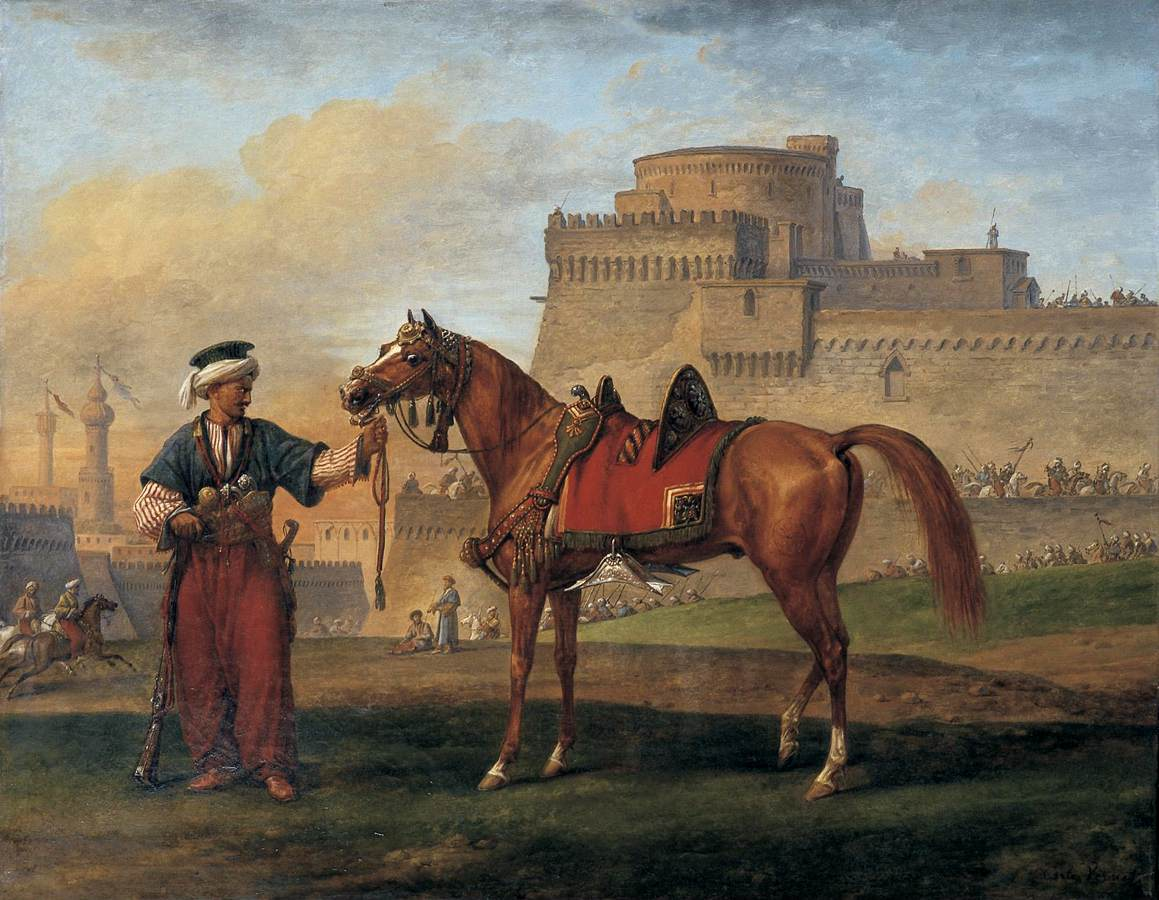
A Mameluke Leading His Horse

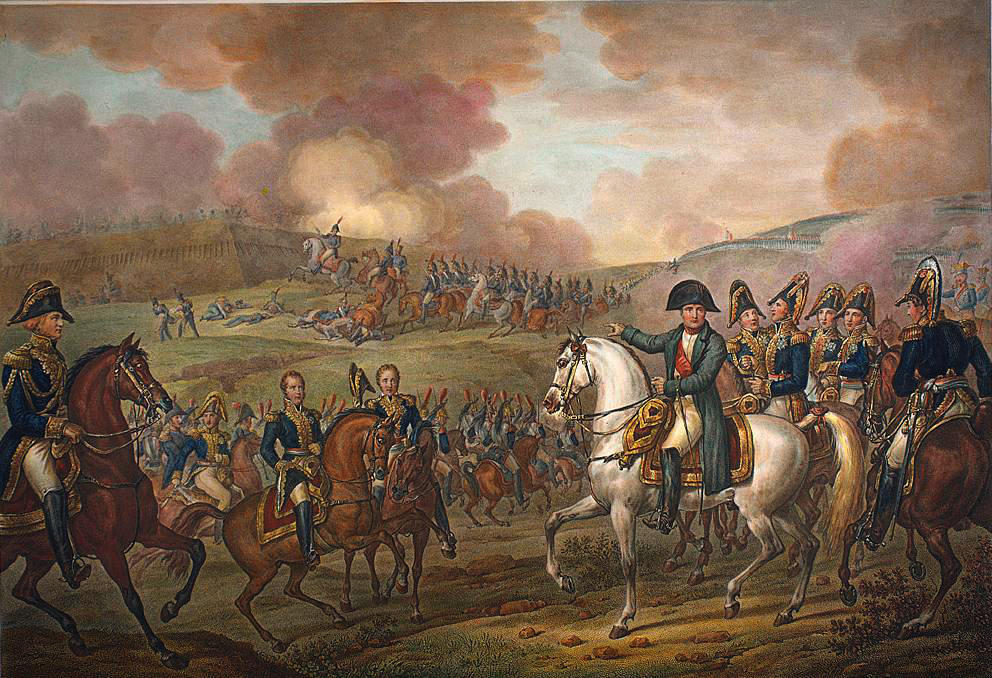
Napoleon at the Battle of Borodino

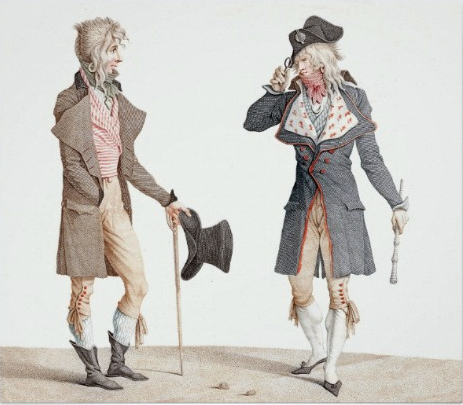
Un Incroyable, two French dandies, one bearing what may be the first recorded top hat

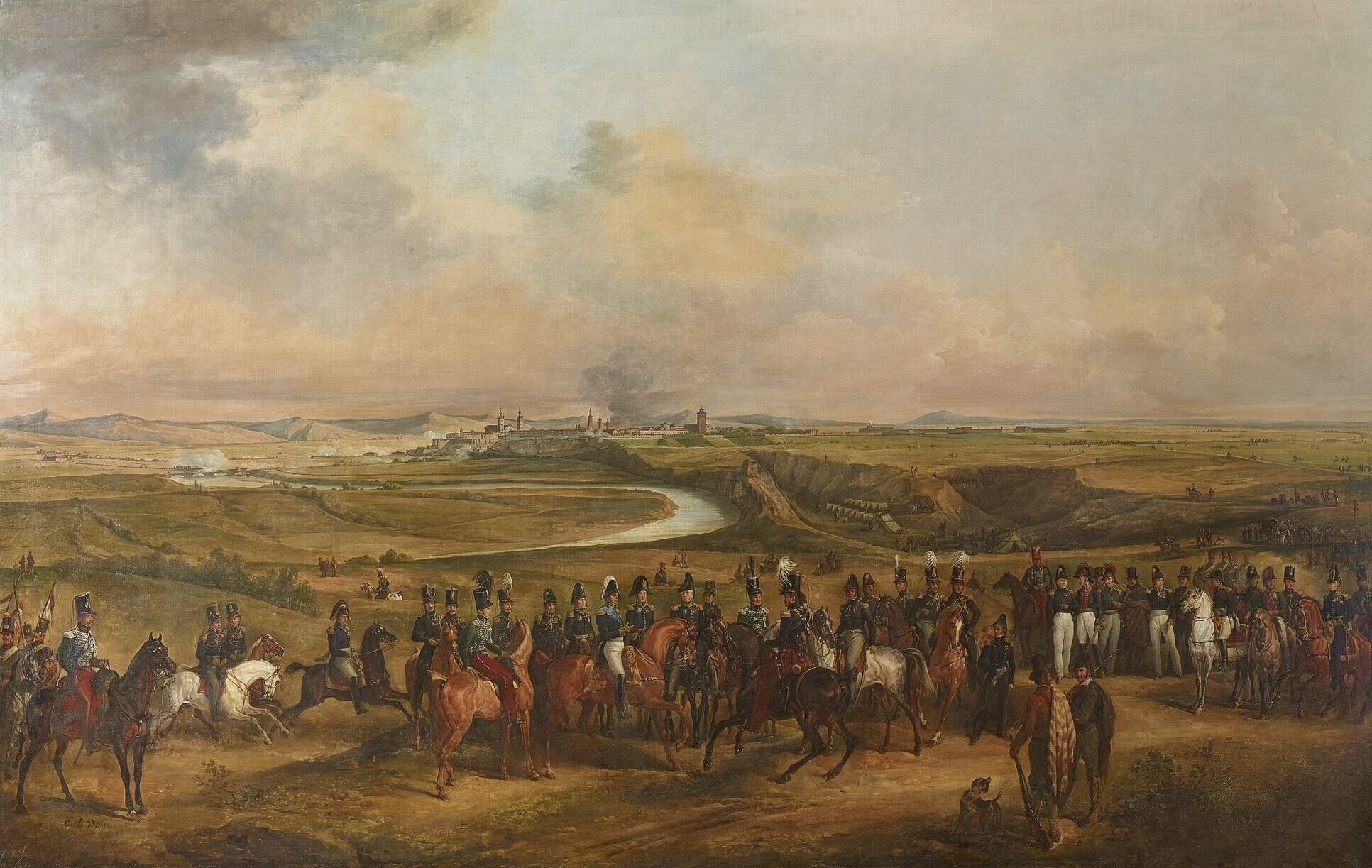
Capture of Pamplona, 17 September 1823 (1824)

== See also ==
- Les Neuf Sœurs
- Felice Cerruti Bauduc
