= Siege of Pamplona (1823) =

1823 siege of the Hundred Thousand Sons of Saint Louis

- Part of the Hundred Thousand Sons of Saint Louis
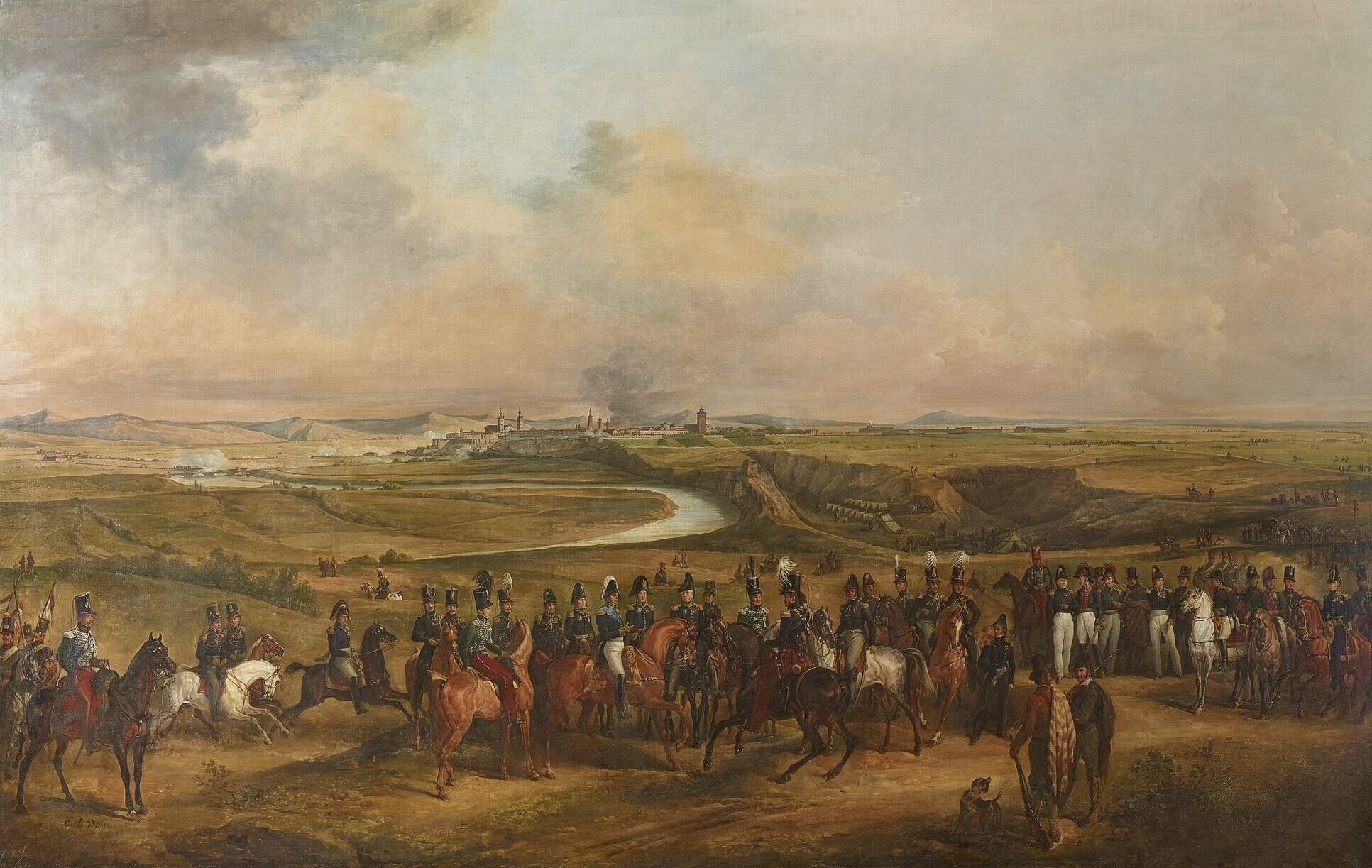
- Capture of Pamplona, 17 September 1823; Carle Vernet, 1824
Date	10 April – 17 September 1823
Location	Pamplona, Spain
Result	French victory

Belligerents
Kingdom of France (Spain) Spanish Royalists	(Spain) Supporters of the Cortes

Commanders and leaders
(Kingdom of France) Gabriel Molitor (Kingdom of France) Vincent Martel Deconchy (Kingdom of France) Jacques Lauriston	(Spain) Joaquín Romualdo de Pablo y Antón

The siege of Pamplona (French: siège de Pampelune, Spanish: asedio de Pamplona) took place in 1823 during the French invasion of Spain. The city of Pamplona in Navarre was besieged by the French Army and successfully taken. It was one of the more notable actions of the campaign along with the Battle of Trocadero.

Following a dispute between Ferdinand VII the Liberal Government the King was seized, provoking a reaction from Ferdinand's fellow Bourbon monarch Louis XVIII of France. An expeditionary force under Duke of Angoulême crossed the Bidasoa on 7 April 1823. Forces were detached to Pamplona and San Sebastián. The main force under Angoulême pressed on to Madrid and then towards Seville, but these Liberal strongholds in otherwise royalist territory needed to be taken in order to secure lines of communication.

Spanish Royalist forces began to surround Pamplona then waited for the arrival of French regulars. Initially Gabriel Molitor commanded the besiegers, but he then accompanied Infante Carlos to San Sebastian and command passed to Vincent Martel Deconchy until his death from illness. A steady bombardment from French siege artillery continued during the period. The French commander Marshal Jacques Lauriston was preparing an infantry assault on the city when the white flag was raised. The garrison who sought terms on the 16 September and surrendered formally the next day.

The surrender of Cádiz on 23 September 1823 and the release of Ferdinand VII led to the end of the war the same month. The remaining French troops gradually withdrew over the next four years. The artist Carle Vernet produced a painting The Capture of Pamplona which he exhibited at the Salon of 1824 in Paris.

== Bibliography ==
- Collins, Bruce. Wellington and the Siege of San Sebastian, 1813. Pen and Sword, 2017.
- Fremont-Barnes, Gregory. The Encyclopedia of the French Revolutionary and Napoleonic Wars: A Political, Social, and Military History. Bloomsbury Academic, 2006.
- Jarrett, Mark. The Congress of Vienna and Its Legacy: War and Great Power Diplomacy After Napoleon. I.B. Tauris, 2013.
