= Hundred Thousand Sons of Saint Louis =

1823 expedition of the Royalist War

- Part of the Royalist War
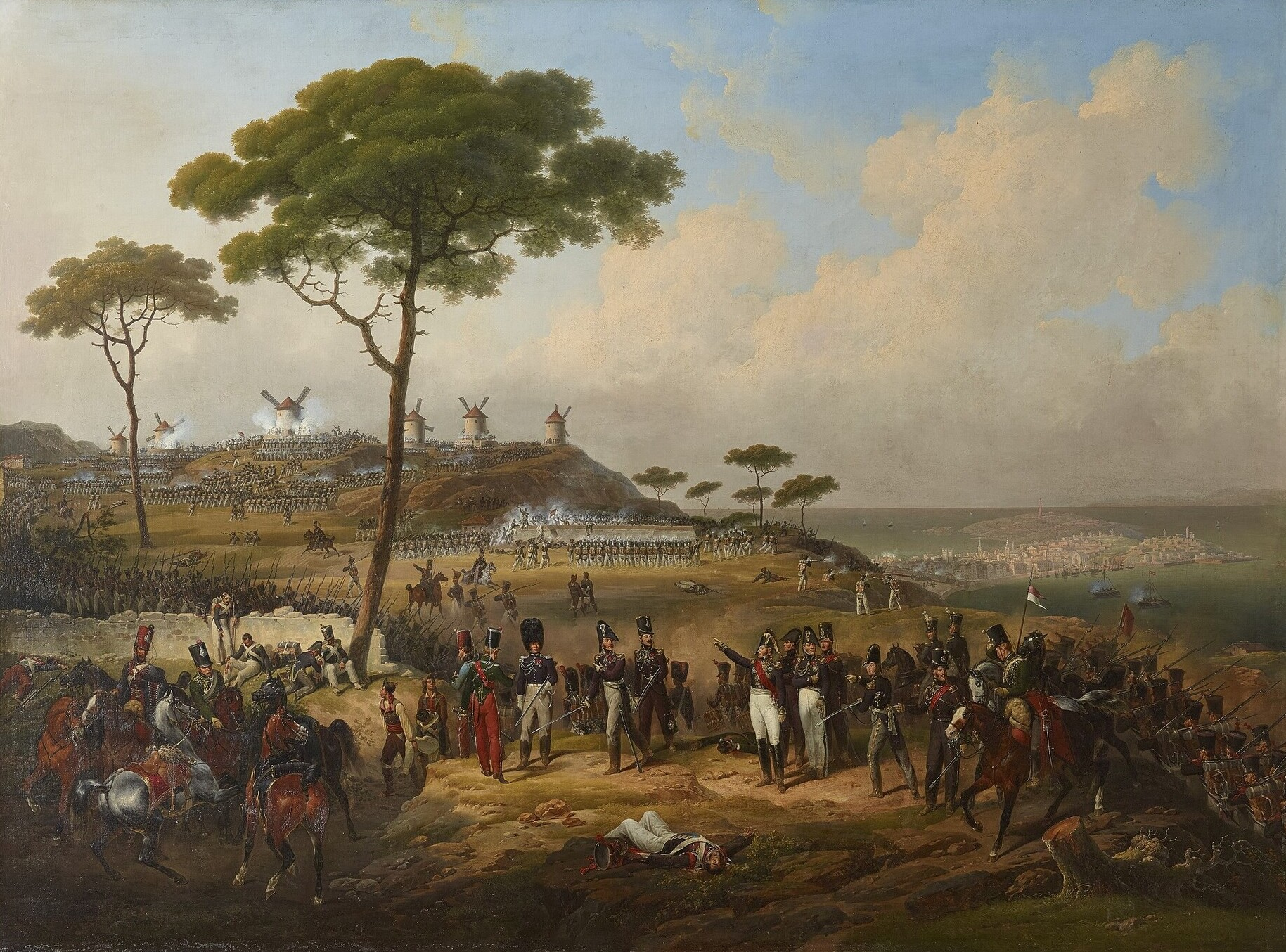
- Attack and capture of the entrenchments in front of La Coruña by Bourke's division, 15 July 1823 by Hippolyte Lecomte, 1828
Date	18 April – 23 November 1823
Location	Spain
Result	French and Spanish Royalist victory: End of the Trienio Liberal; Start of the Ominous Decade

Belligerents
France (Spain) Armée de la Foi	(Spain) Partisans of the Cortes

Commanders and leaders
(Bourbon Restoration in France) Duke of Angoulême; (Bourbon Restoration in France) Armand Guilleminot; (Bourbon Restoration in France) Nicolas Charles Oudinot; (Bourbon Restoration in France) Gabriel Molitor; (Bourbon Restoration in France) Bon-Adrien Jeannot de Moncey; (Bourbon Restoration in France) Étienne Bordesoulle; (Bourbon Restoration in France) Louis de Hohenlohe	(Spain) Rafael del Riego (executed); (Spain) Pablo Morillo; (Spain) Francisco Ballesteros; (Spain) Francisco Espoz; (Spain) Miguel de Álava; (Spain) Count of La Bisbal

Casualties and losses
France: 400 killed	600 killed

The "Hundred Thousand Sons of Saint Louis" was the popular name for a French army mobilized in 1823 by the Bourbon King of France, Louis XVIII, to help the Spanish Bourbon royalists restore King Ferdinand VII of Spain to the absolute power of which he had been deprived during the Liberal Triennium. Despite the name, the actual number of troops was between 60,000 and 90,000.

A minor campaign, the force comprised some five army corps (the bulk of the French regular army) and was led by the Duke of Angoulême, nephew of Louis XVIII and son of future King Charles X. The French name of the conflict is l'Expédition d'Espagne ("the Expedition of Spain").

== Context ==
In 1822, Ferdinand VII applied the terms of the Congress of Vienna, lobbied for the assistance of the other absolute monarchs of Europe, in the process joining the Holy Alliance formed by Russia, Prussia, Austria and France to restore absolutism. In France, the ultra-royalists pressured Louis XVIII to intervene. To temper their counter-revolutionary ardor, the Duc de Richelieu deployed troops along the Pyrenees Mountains along the France-Spain border, charging them with halting the spread of Spanish liberalism and the "yellow fever" from encroaching into France. In September 1822, this "cordon sanitaire" became an observation corps and then very quickly transformed itself into a military expedition.

== France considers intervention ==
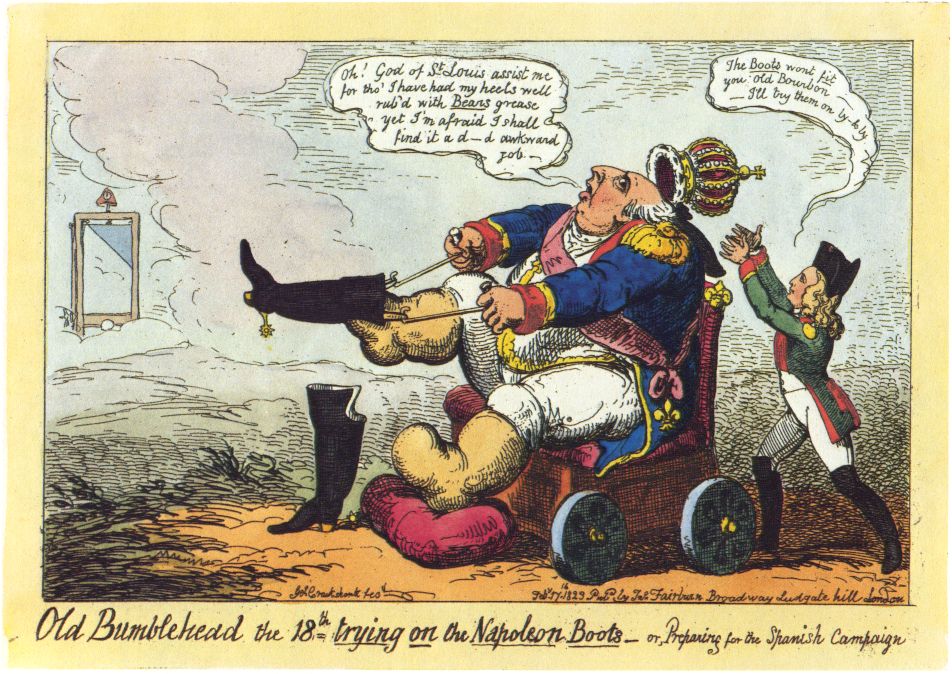
"Old Bumblehead the 18th Trying On the Napoleon Boots, or, Preparing for the Spanish Campaign". Caricature by George Cruikshank.

The Holy Alliance (Russia, Austria and Prussia) refused Ferdinand's request for help, but the Quintuple Alliance (Russia, Britain, France, Prussia and Austria) at the Congress of Verona in October 1822 gave France a mandate to intervene and restore the Spanish monarchy. Britain protested loudly but was outvoted. On 22 January 1823, a secret treaty, from which Britain was excluded, was signed at the Congress of Verona, allowing France to intervene in Spain to help restore Ferdinand VII as an absolute monarch. With the agreement from the Holy Alliance, on 28 January 1823 Louis XVIII announced that "a hundred thousand Frenchmen are ready to march, invoking the name of Saint Louis, to safeguard the throne of Spain for a grandson of Henry IV of France". At the end of February, France's Chambers voted an extraordinary grant for the expedition. Chateaubriand and the ultra-royalists rejoiced; the royal army was going to prove its bravery and devotion in the face of Spanish liberals, fighting for the glory of the Bourbon monarchy.

The new prime minister, Joseph de Villèle, intended to oppose the war. The operation's cost just for aide was excessive, the army's organisation was defective and the troops' loyalty was uncertain. The superintendent of the military was unable to assure logistic support for the expedition's 95,000 men (as counted at the end of March) concentrated in the Basses-Pyrénées and the Landes with 20,000 horses and 96 artillery pieces. To remedy his doubts, he had to consult the munitions-supplier Ouvrard, who quickly concluded that marches in Spain were as favourable to his own interests as to those of the army, even if they would be to the detriment of the public treasury.

== French force ==
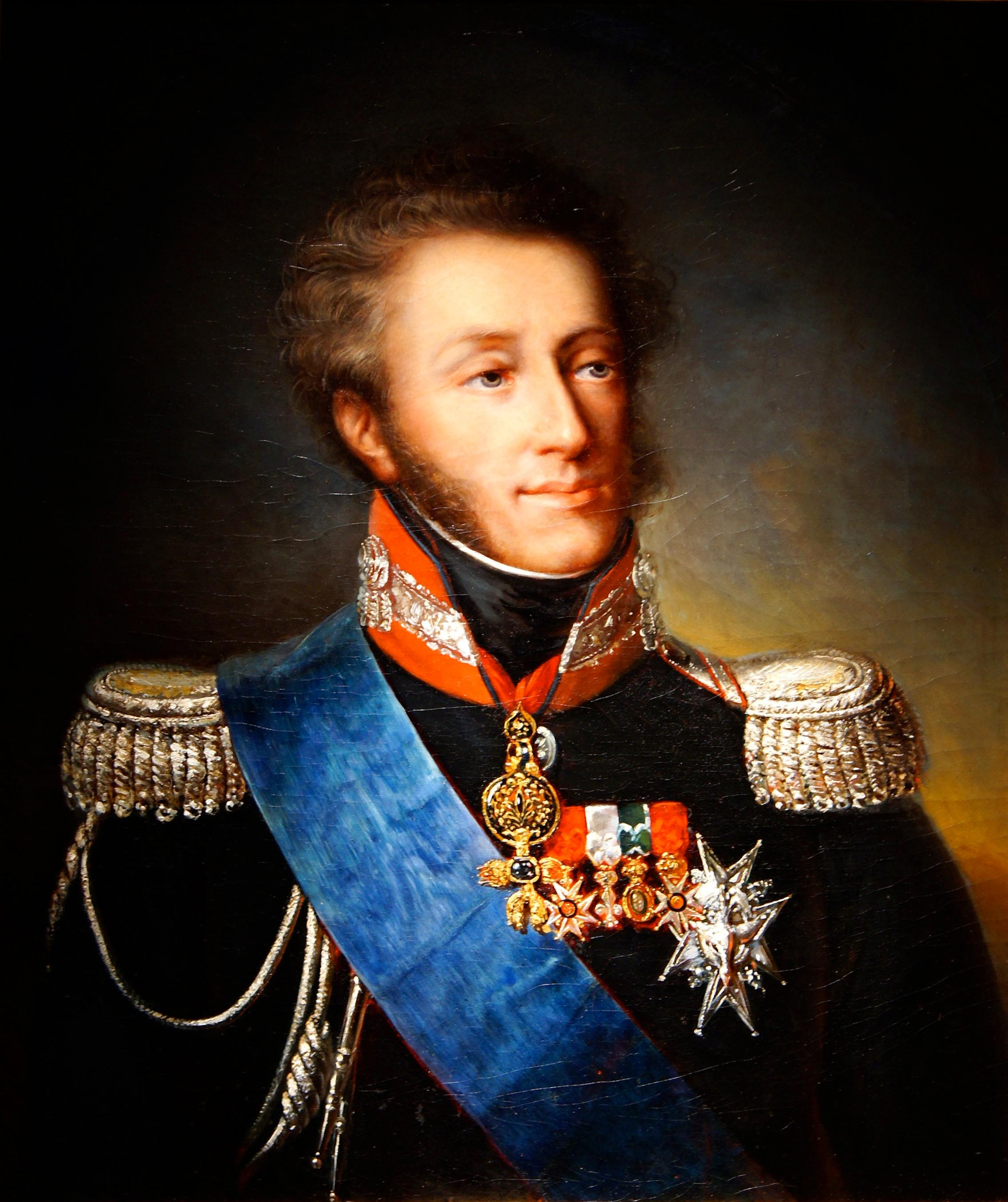
Louis Antoine d'Artois, Duke of Angoulême (1775–1844), son of the future Charles X of France, fought on behalf of Louis XVIII during the French intervention in the Spanish Civil War.

=== Command structure ===
The organisation of the expedition's command structure posed many problems. Pro-Bourbon commanders had to be given the full chance to exercise the roles they had so recently been given by the Bourbon Restoration without compromising the army's loyalty or efficiency. The solution was to give the secondary commands to royalist former émigrés and Vendéens, and the primary ones to former generals of the Revolution and First Empire. Despite his lack of military experience, the Duke of Angoulême, whose father was heir to the throne, was made commander-in-chief of the Army of the Pyrénées, but he agreed to a role overseeing only the political direction of the expedition, leaving its military direction to Major-General Armand Charles Guilleminot, a tried-and-tested general of the First Empire.

Four of the five army corps were placed under generals who had fought for Napoleon – Marshal Nicolas Charles Oudinot, Duke of Reggio; General Gabriel Jean Joseph Molitor; Marshal Bon Adrien Jeannot de Moncey, Duke of Conegliano; and General Étienne Tardif de Pommeroux de Bordesoulle. The Prince of Hohenlohe commanded the Third Corps, the least-trusted of the five, with only two divisions and 16,000 men (as opposed to three or four divisions and 20 to 27 thousand men in the other corps).

=== Loyalty ===
The expedition was made up of regiments in which many of the officers, NCOs and men had been marked by memories of the Napoleonic Wars and so were disposed more kindly towards the liberals than were the French and Spanish Bourbons. The liberals hoped to dissuade the Frenchmen from fighting "for monks, against liberty". Villèle was worried at their propaganda in bars and billets, as a song by Béranger spread throughout March and April inciting the French soldiers to mutiny:

Brav' soldats, v'la l'ord' du jour:
Point de victoire
Où n'y a point de gloire.
Brav' soldats, v'la l'ord' du jour:
Gard' à vous! Demi-tour!

Translation:

Brave soldiers, this is the order of the day:
There is no victory
Where there is no glory.
Brave soldiers, this is the order of the day:
Attention! About face!

== Course ==
=== Outbreak ===
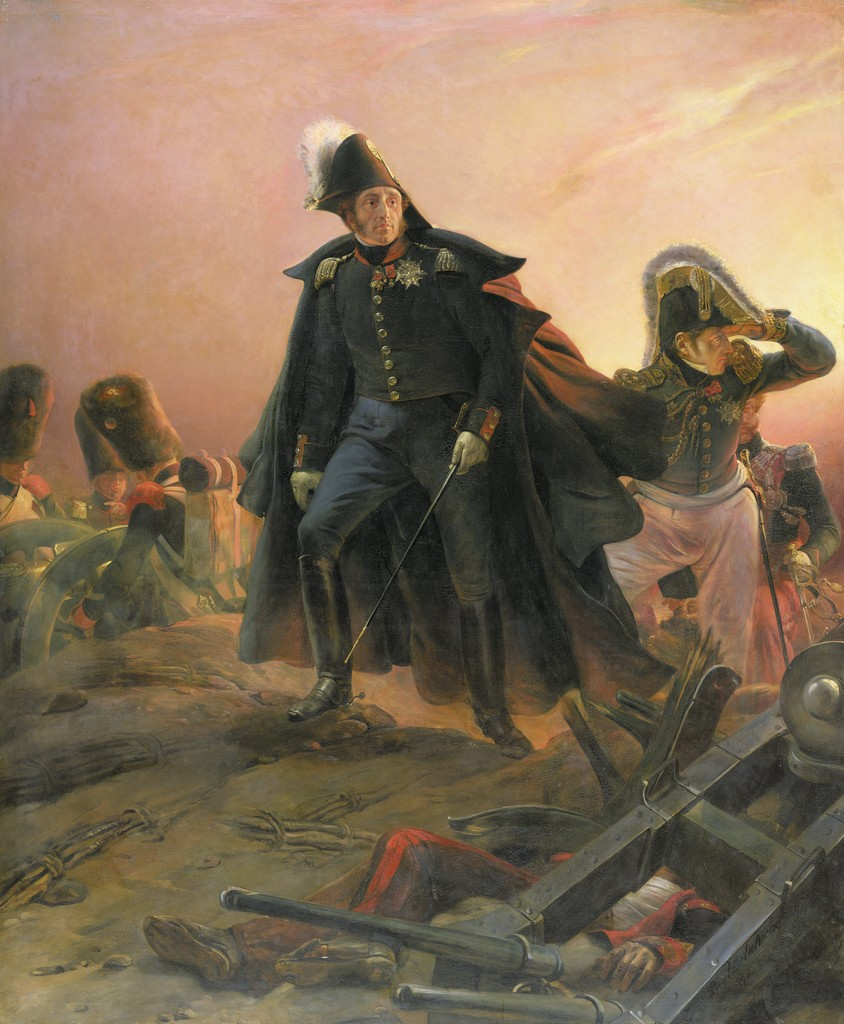
The Duke of Angoulême at the Taking of Trocadero by Paul Delaroche, 1828.

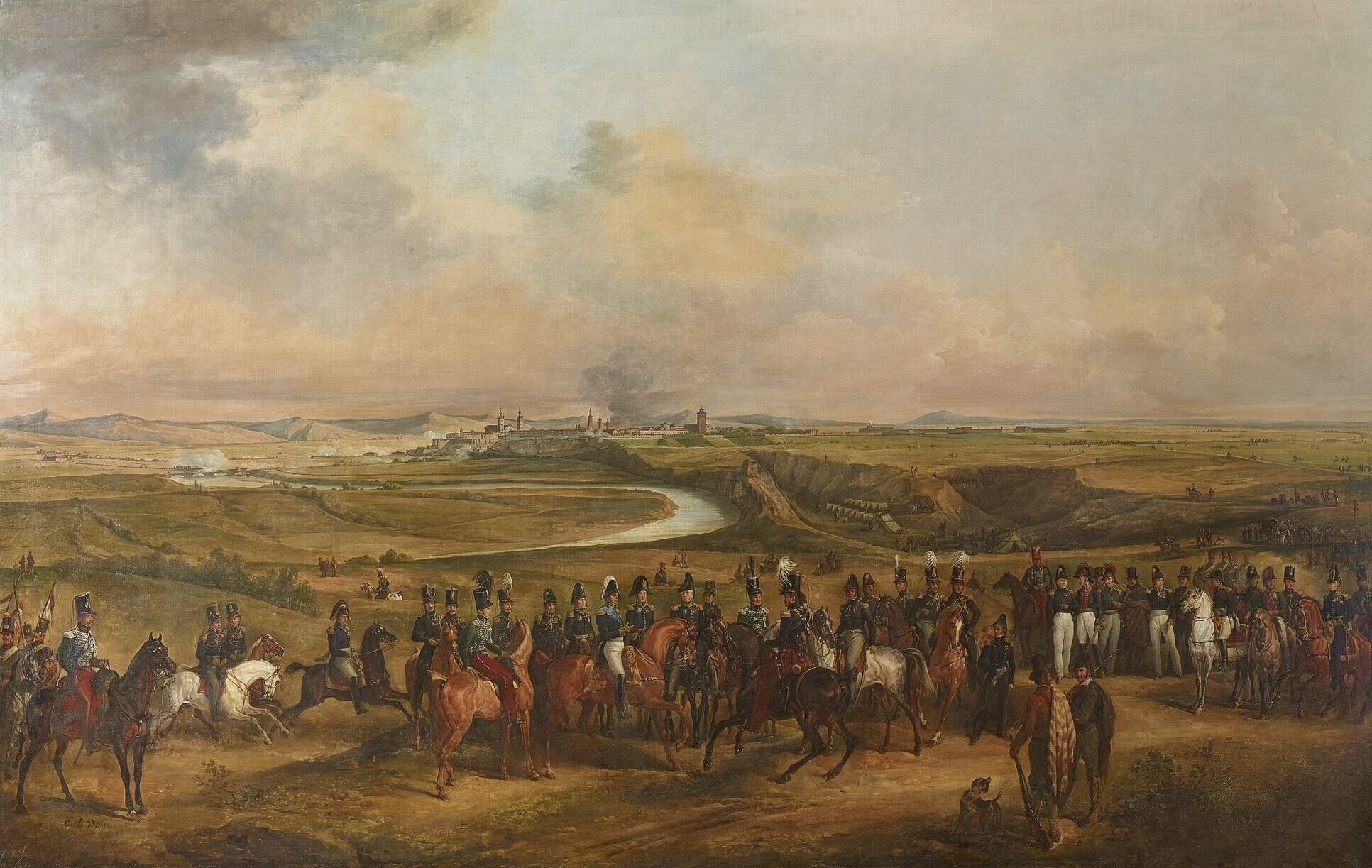
Painting by Carle Vernet depicting the successful French siege of Pamplona

On 6 April, the doubts of some and the illusions of others dispersed. On the banks of the Bidassoa, 500 liberal French and Piedmontese men faced off against the forward positions of the 9th Light Infantry Regiment. Brandishing a French Tricolour flag and singing La Marseillaise, they incited the soldiers not to cross the frontier. The King's infantrymen hesitated until General Louis Vallin rushed to them and ordered them to open fire. Several of the demonstrators were killed and the others dispersed. Many of them joined Englishmen under Colonel Robert Wilson, Belgians under Jan Willem Janssens and other French or Italian volunteers to form a liberal legion and a squadron of "liberty lancers" to fight beside the Spanish constitutional forces. The following day, on 7 April, the "100,000 Sons of Saint Louis" under the Duke of Angoulême entered Spain without opposition from the constitutional government's forces and with the support of the middle classes and part of the urban population.

=== French advance ===
In the north, Hohenlohe's 3rd Corps (reinforced in July by Lauriston's 5th Corps) forced General Morillo to retreat before rallying his troops. The French were left in control of the rural parts of Navarre, Asturias and Galicia; however, lacking siege equipment, they were unable to blockade the towns, where the liberals continued to resist for several more months. The city of A Coruña surrendered on 21 August, Pamplona on 16 September, and San Sebastián on 27 September. To the east and the southeast, General Molitor pushed back General Francisco Ballesteros into Aragon, pursuing him as far as Murcia and Granada, winning an engagement at Campillo de Arenas on 28 July and forcing his surrender on 4 August. At Jaén, he defeated the final columns of Rafael Riego, who was captured by the Absolutists on 15 September and hanged in Madrid on 7 November, two days before the fall of Alicante. In Catalonia, Moncey managed to quell General Mina's regular and guerrilla forces, with Barcelona surrendering only on 2 November.

=== Andalusian front ===
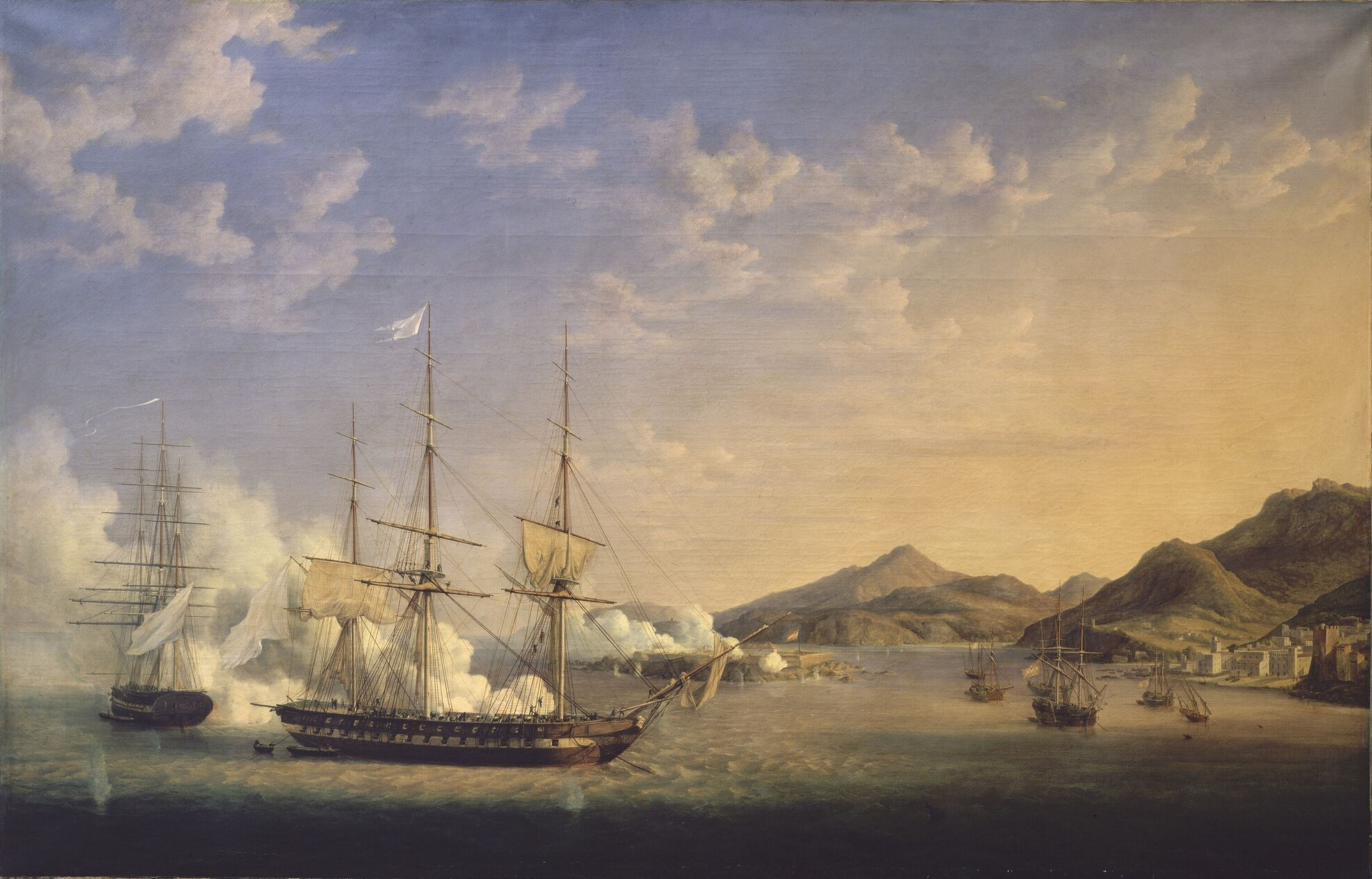
The French frigates Guerrière and Galathée attacking Spanish batteries in the Bay of Gibraltar on 13 August 1823

More decisive operations spread across Andalusia, since it was the site of Cádiz, transformed into the Constitutionalists' provisional capital and thus the French force's main strategic objective. It contained the Cortes and the imprisoned king and was defended by a garrison of 14,000 men. At first Riego, then Generals Henry Joseph O'Donnell, Count of La Bisbal, Quiroga and Miguel de Álava led the action. Access to the city was protected by the batteries of Fort Santa Catalina and Fort San Sebastian to the west, Fort Santi-Pietri to the east and above all by the fortified peninsula of Fort de Trocadéro, where Colonel Garcés positioned 1700 men and 50 guns.

Under the command of General Étienne Tardif de Pommeroux de Bordesoulle, soon joined by the Duke of Angoulême and Guilleminot, the infantry of generals Bourmont, Obert and Goujeon, the cavalry of Foissac-Latour, the artillery of Louis Tirlet and the engineers under Guillaume Dode de la Brunerie took up positions before Cádiz from mid-July. Forced to use several naval divisions for surveillance of Spain's Atlantic and Mediterranean ports and coasts (held by the Constitutionalists), the French navy was able to spare only a small squadron of 10 ships under Counter-Admiral Jacques Félix Emmanuel Hamelin to blockade the city. That proved too small a force for Hamelin to succeed in this mission and so on 27 August he was replaced by Counter-Admiral des Rotours, then by Duperré, who arrived only on 17 September, with meagre reinforcements.

=== Conclusion ===
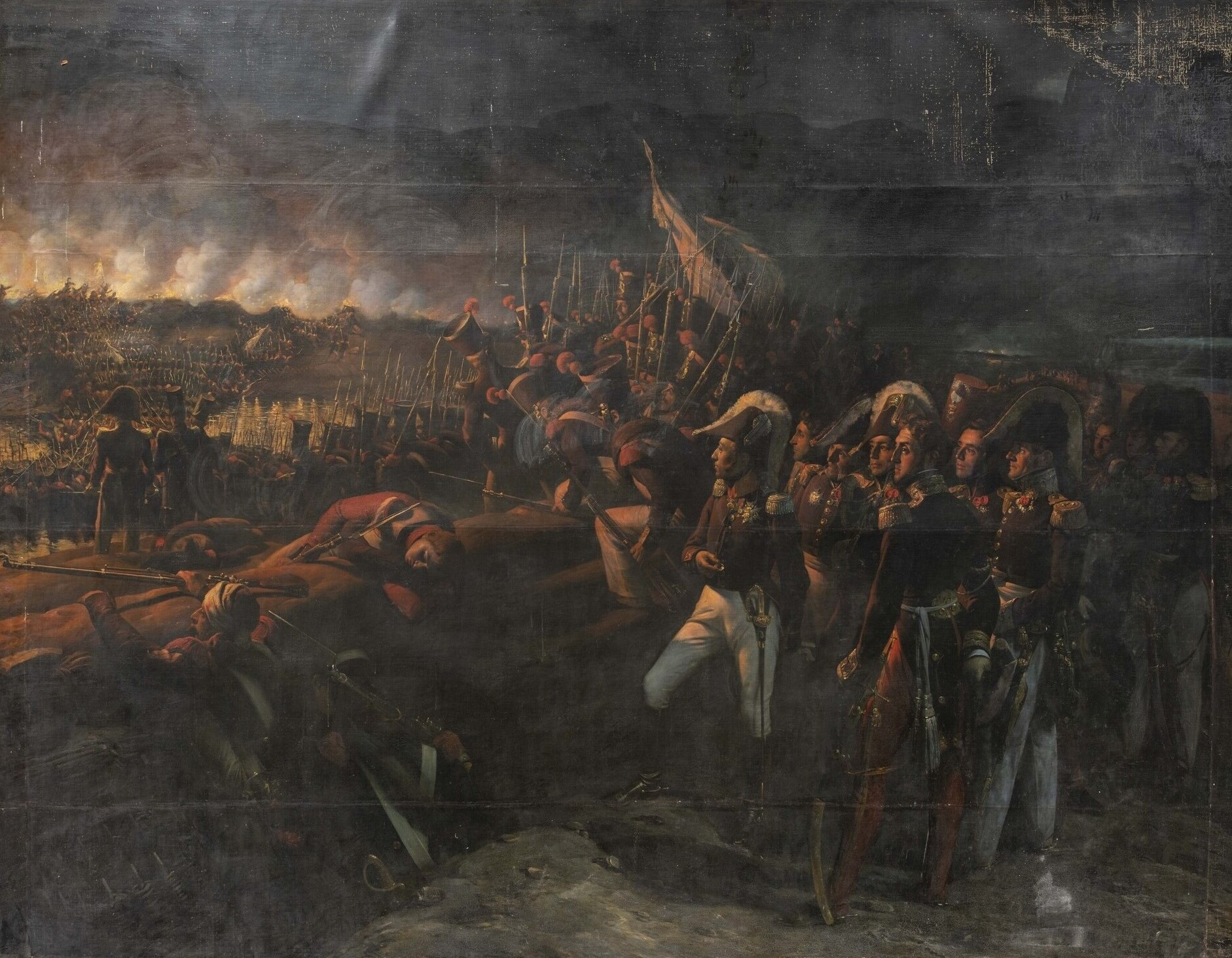
French troops besieging the fort of Trocadero

On 31 August the French infantry assaulted Fort de Trocadero and successfully captured it at the cost of 35 killed, 110 wounded (with 150 dead, 300 wounded, 1,100 captured among the garrison), turning its powerful guns towards Cádiz. On 20 September, Fort Sancti-Petri fell in its turn in a combined army–navy operation. On 23 September, the guns of the Sancti-Petri and Trocadero forts and of Duperré's fleet bombarded the town and on 28 the constitutionalists adjudged the town lost. Thus, the Cortes decided to dissolve itself, give back absolute power to Ferdinand VII and hand him over to the French. On 30 September Cádiz surrendered and on 3 October more than 4,600 French troops landed at its port. The French army fired its last shots in Spain at the start of November. On 5 November, the Duke of Angoulême left Madrid and re-entered France on 23 November, leaving behind an occupying force of 45,000 men under the command of Bourmont. Spain was then progressively evacuated, but the French withdrawal was fully completed only in 1828.

== Consequences ==
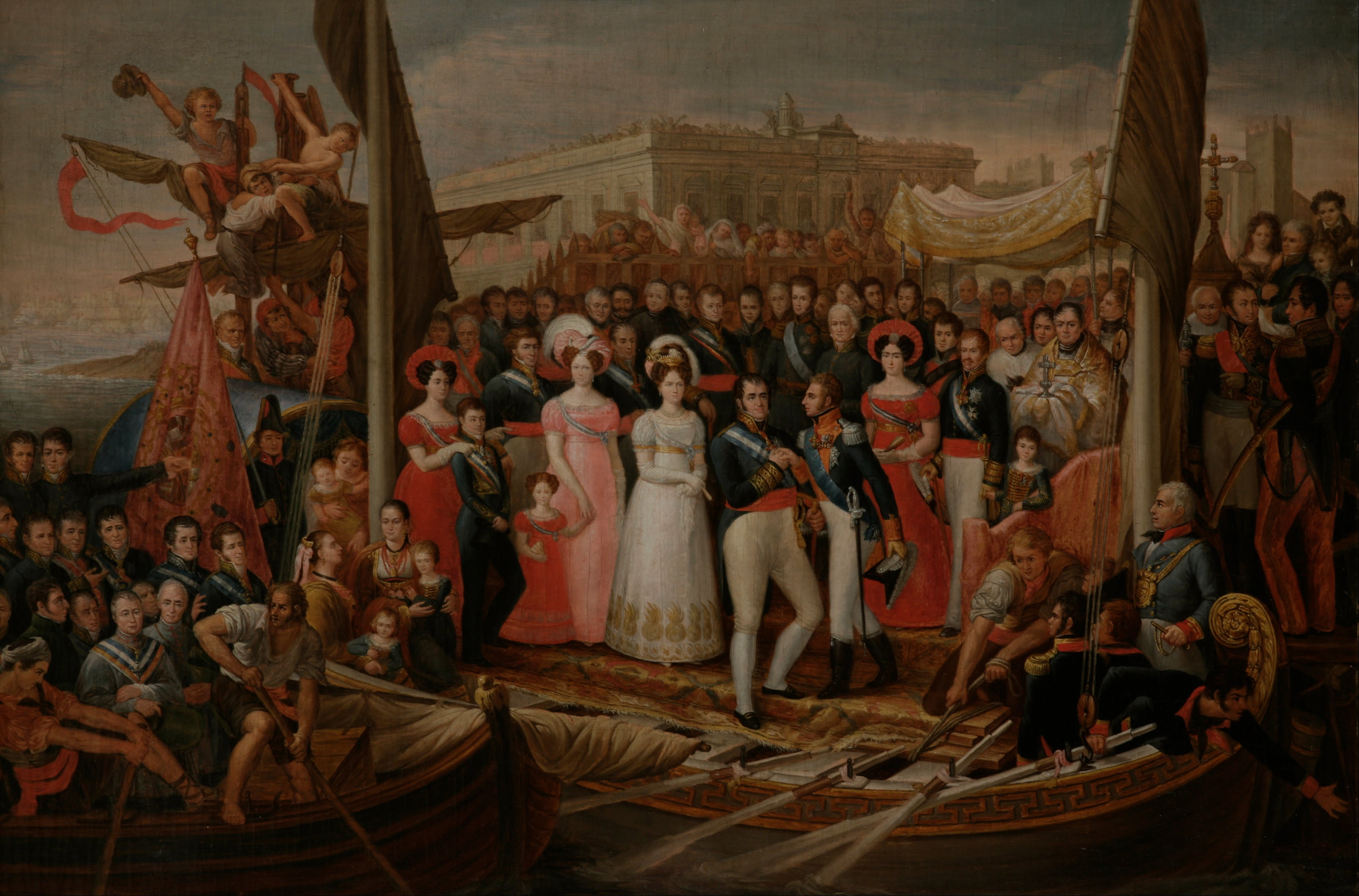
The Landing of Ferdinand VII in El Puerto de Santa María by José Aparicio, 1828. The newly-released Ferdinand VII is show meeting with Angloumene and other French commanders.

France's role in aiding to Ferdinand was key. The liberals thus negotiated their return in exchange for Ferdinand's oath to respect the Spanish laws. However, on 1 October 1823, feeling bolstered by French forces, Ferdinand broke his oath and again repealed the Constitution of Cádiz and declared null and void all the acts and measures of the liberal government.

The war also seriously disturbed Spanish efforts to crush the independence struggles in Hispanic America. The last Spanish forces in mainland South America were defeated in the Battle of Ayacucho in 1824.

Although the goals of the military campaigns in Spain were completely different, François-René de Chateaubriand, foreign minister in France's Villèle government (from 28 December 1822 to 6 June 1824), contrasted the expedition's successful aid in restoring the Spanish royalist with Napoleon's failure of subjugating and conquering Spain in the Peninsular War:

Striding across the Spains, succeeding where Bonaparte had failed, triumphing on the same soil where a great man's arms had suffered setbacks, doing in six months what he was unable to do in seven years, was a true miracle!

== Allusion ==
During the Spanish Civil War in the 1930s, the carabineros of Republican Spain were nicknamed "The Hundred Thousand Sons of Negrín".

== Bibliography ==
=== In French ===
- Encyclopédie Universalis, Paris, Volume 18, 2000
- Larousse, tome 1, 2, 3, Paris, 1998
- Caron, Jean-Claude, La France de 1815 à 1848, Paris, Armand Colin, coll. Cursus, 2004, 193 p.
- Corvisier, André, Histoire militaire de la France, de 1715 à 1871, tome 2, Paris, Presses universitaires de France, "Quadrige" collection, 1998, 627 p.
- Demier, Francis, La France du XIXe 1814–1914, Seuil, 2000, 606 p.
- Dulphy, Anne, Histoire de l'Espagne de 1814 à nos jours, le défi de la modernisation, Paris, Armand Colin, "128" collection, 2005, 127 p.
- Duroselle, Jean-Baptiste, L'Europe de 1815 à nos jours : vie politique et relation internationale, Paris, Presses Universitaires de France, "Nouvelle clio" collection, 1967, 363 p.
- Garrigues, Jean, Lacombrade, Philippe, La France au 19e siècle, 1814-1914, Paris, Armand Colin, "Campus" collection, 2004, 191 p.
- Lever, Evelyne, Louis XVIII, Paris, Fayard, 1998, 597 p.
- Jean Sarrailh, Un homme d'état espagnol: Martínez de la Rosa (1787–1862) (Paris, 1930)

=== In Spanish ===
- Miguel Artola Gallego, La España de Fernando VII (Madrid, 1968)
- Jonathan Harris, "Los escritos de codificación de Jeremy Bentham y su recepción en el primer liberalismo español", Télos. Revista Iberoamericana de Estudios Utilitaristas 8 (1999), 9–29
- W. Ramírez de Villa-Urrutia, Fernando VII, rey constitucional. Historia diplomática de España de 1820 a 1823 (Madrid, 1922)

=== In English ===
- Raymond Carr, Spain 1808–1975 (Oxford, 1982, 2nd ed.)
- Charles W. Fehrenbach, "Moderados and Exaltados: the liberal opposition to Ferdinand VII, 1814–1823", Hispanic American Historical Review 50 (1970), 52-69
- Jonathan Harris, "An English utilitarian looks at Spanish American independence: Jeremy Bentham's Rid Yourselves of Ultramaria", The Americas 53 (1996), 217-33
- Ralph Weaver, The Hundred Thousand Sons of St Louis. The French Campaign in Spain April to October 1823, Helion & Company Limited 2018, ISBN 978-1-912174-09-6.

== See also ==
- Concert of Europe
- Congress of Verona
- Holy Alliance
- Ominous Decade
- Peninsular War
