= François Pouqueville =

French diplomat, writer, explorer, physician and historian

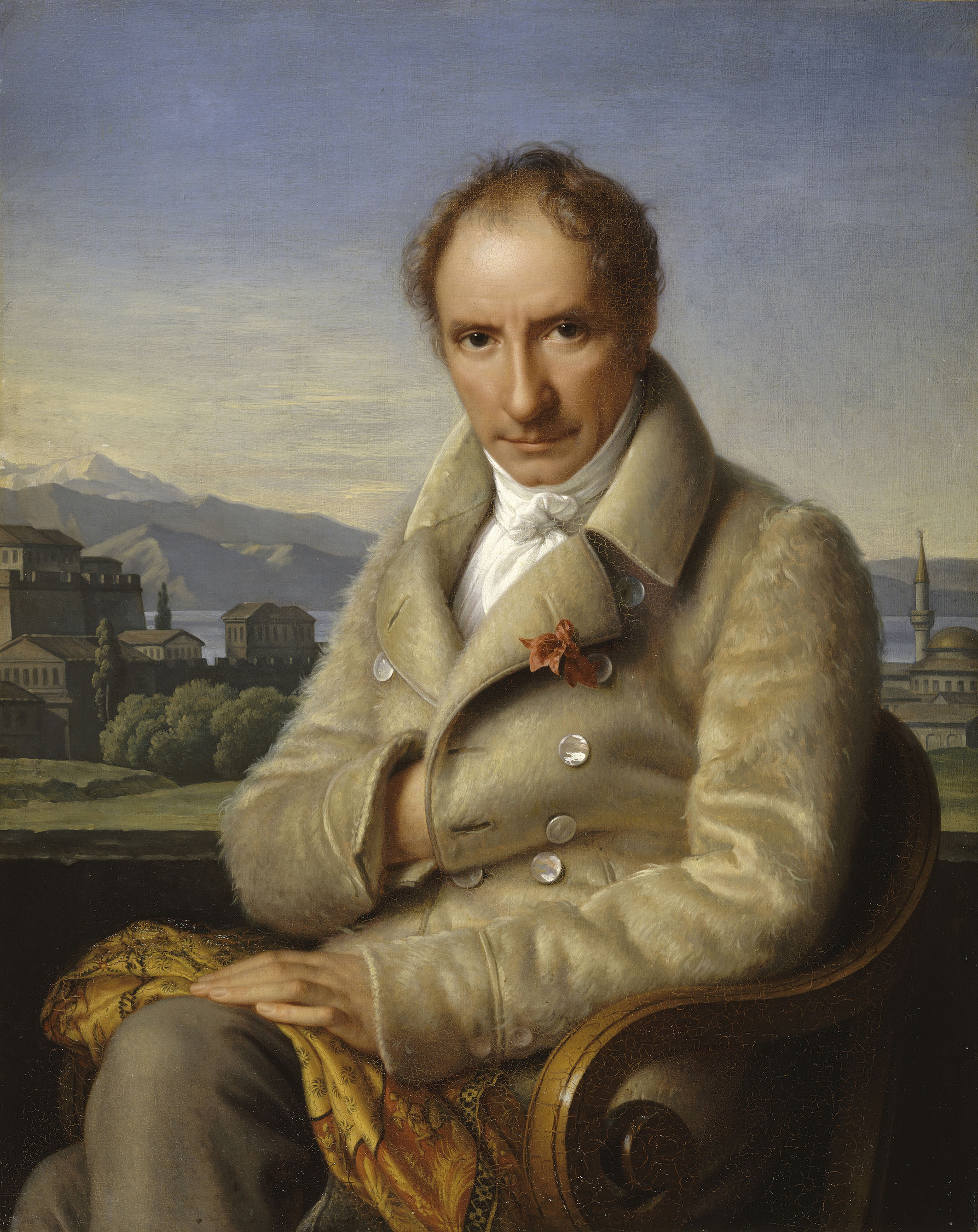
- Portrait by Henriette Lorimier, 1830
- Born: 4 November 1770; Le Merlerault, Normandy, France
- Died: 20 December 1838 (aged 68); Paris, France
- Occupations: Academician, diplomat, writer, medical doctor, historian, archaeologist
- Known for: His influential diplomacy and writings

François Charles Hugues Laurent Pouqueville (French: [pukvil]; 4 November 1770 – 20 December 1838) was a French diplomat, writer, explorer, physician and historian, and member of the Institut de France.

He traveled extensively throughout Ottoman-occupied Greece from 1798 to 1820; first as the Turkish sultan's hostage, then as Napoleon Bonaparte's general consul at the court of Ali Pasha of Ioannina.

Through his diplomacy and writings, he became a prominent architect of the Philhellenism movement throughout Europe and contributed to the liberation of the Greeks and the rebirth of the Greek nation.

== Youth: minister and revolutionary ==
His uncommon talent as a writer revealed itself early in a lifelong correspondence with his younger brother, Hugues, and their sister, Adèle.

His detailed letters to his siblings are still a source of knowledge on the life of a world traveler, explorer, and diplomat during the French Revolution, the Napoleonic Empire, and the restoration of the French monarchy at the turn of the 19th century.

Pouqueville studied at the college of Caen before joining the Lisieux. He became a deacon and was ordained at 21. He then was vicar in his native Montmarcé.

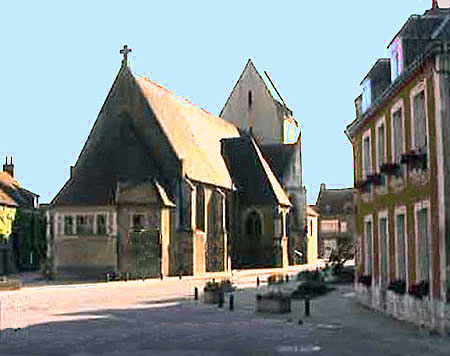
Le Merlerault church

Initially known as a young Royalist minister, he was protected and saved by his congregation from the massacres of aristocrats by revolutionary mobs in the Reign of Terror.

Like many young French aristocrats, he supported the rising democratic movement. When Le Merlerault adopted the new Constitution on 14 July 1793 (year 2 of the French Republic), Pouqueville was secretary of the assemblée primaire that approved it.

In 1793, he was assistant to the mayor; finding his vocation with the events of the French Revolution, he resigned from the clergy to become a teacher (1794) and a municipal assistant at Le Merlereault (1795). He remained a fervent Christian all his life.

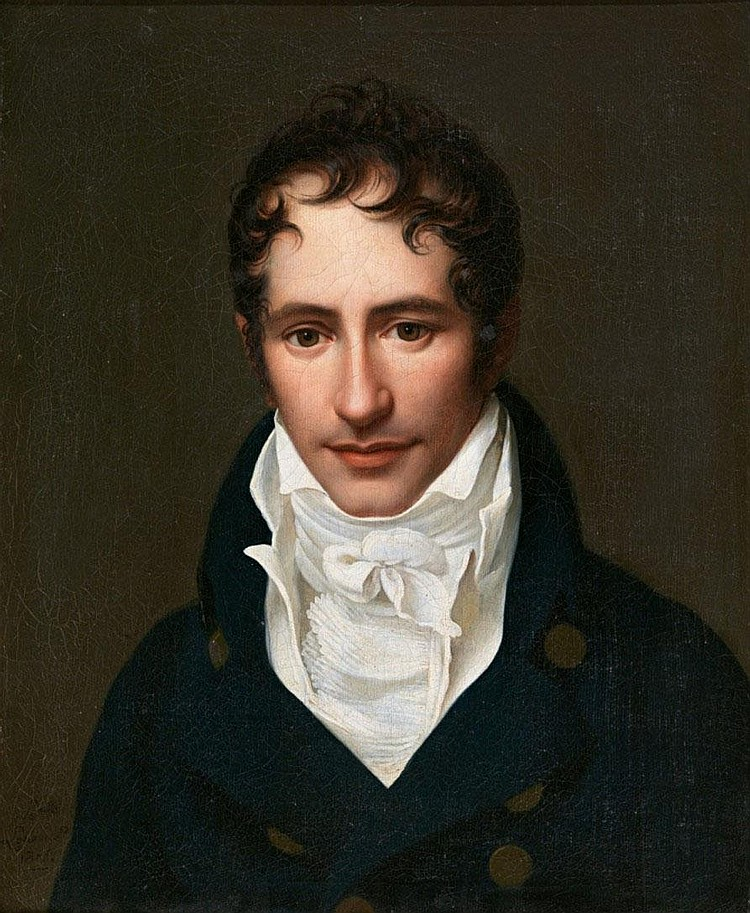
François Pouqueville 1805

However, his renunciation of the cloth, Republican speeches, and open criticism of the papacy made him the target of resurgent royalists in Normandy. He went into hiding (probably in Caen) until the defeat in Quiberon by the army of the Republic led by Lazare Hoche of the royalist forces joined by Charette's chouans), as Bonaparte (nicknamed Captain Cannon) did at the Siege of Toulon, and later in Paris.

When Pouqueville returned to Le Merlerault, the town's physician, Dr. Cochin, who had been his colleague at the college of Caen, took him on as student-surgeon. He then introduced him to his friend, professor Antoine Dubois of the Faculty of Medicine in Paris. Dubois was later the Empress Marie-Louise's doctor when she gave birth to Napoleon's only son, Napoleon II in 1811.

In 1797, Pouqueville left Le Merlerault for Paris. The following year, Pouqueville was one of the surgeons who accompanied then-general Bonaparte's expedition to Egypt. This was a crucial decision that affected the rest of his life.

Pouqueville embarked at Toulon with the ill-fated French Fleet under the command of Général Bonaparte as it sailed towards Egypt. On the way, he witnessed the taking of Malta, and he spent the days of the crossing to Alexandria teaching the French soldiers and sailors the vibrant lyrics of La Marseillaise, the new French national anthem.

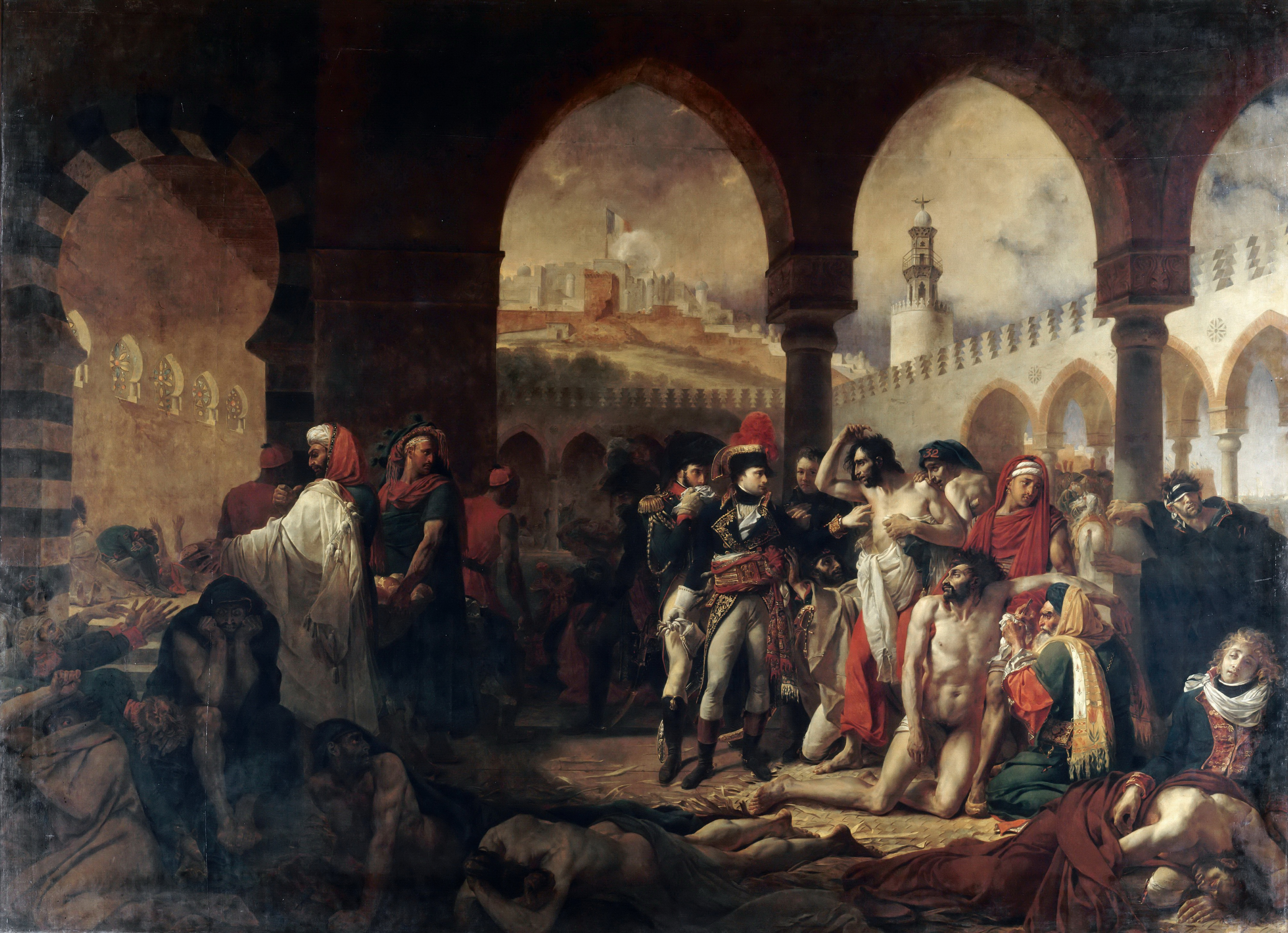
Bonaparte Visiting the Plague Victims of Jaffa (Antoine-Jean Gros, 1804)

== Egypt: Bonaparte, Nelson and pirates ==
After the first battle of Aboukir in 1798, General Kleber entrusted Pouqueville with the negotiations for the exchange of prisoners with Admiral Nelson.

While meeting with leaders of the British Admiralty, he quickly developed a great respect for William Sidney Smith who spoke perfect French and proved to be courteous, human, and a man of honor. Conversely, his encounters with Nelson filled him with repugnance, for the Admiral's treatment of the French officers was both brutal and cruel. From that point, Pouqueville would only mention Nelson under the epithet "blood-thirsty cyclops."

Having caught a bad fever that prevented him from continuing his scientific researches, Pouqueville was advised by Kleber to return to France to receive better medical attention.

He boarded the Italian merchant ship La madonna di Montenegro in Alexandria. En route to Italy, the ship was attacked by Barbary Coast pirates near Calabria. Pouqueville was among those taken prisoner.

== Prisoner of the Turkish sultan ==
=== Peloponnese: Pasha and physician ===
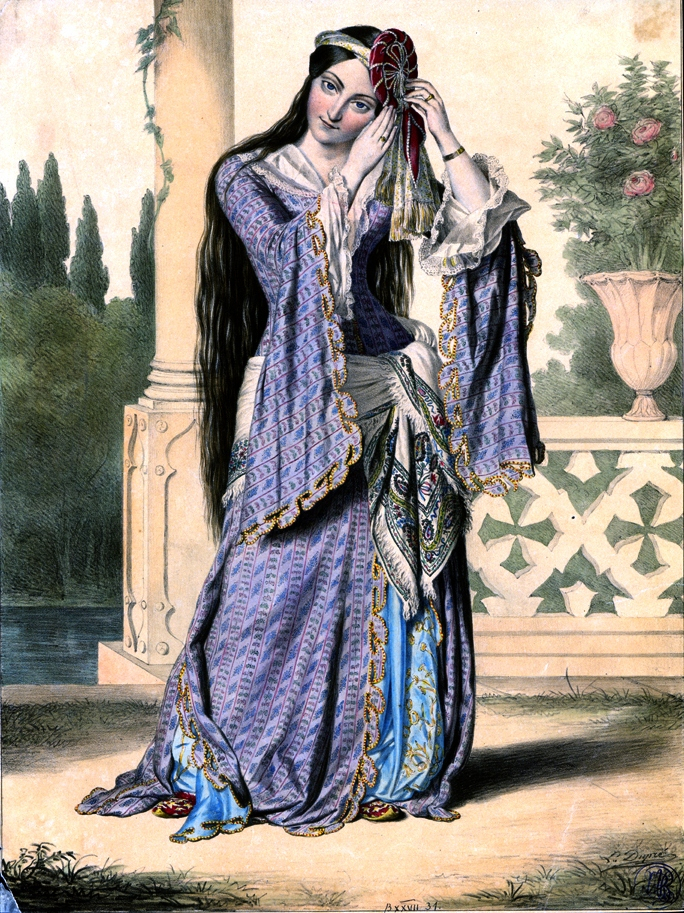
"Greek beauty": The princess Helena Soutzos by Louis Dupré, 1820

Pouqueville was first brought to Navarino and then to Tripolitza, the capital of the Peloponnese. The Ottoman Empire was at war with France at the time. He was remanded to the custody of the pasha of Morea, Moustapha.

Moustapha received him with some indifference, but he gave him decent lodging and protected him against the brutalities of the Albanian soldiers who guarded him.

Soon after, Moustapha was deposed and replaced by Achmet Pacha.

Having learned that Pouqueville practiced medicine, the new pacha treated him well and, after seeing how successful Pouqueville was when healing some members of his entourage, named him official physician of his pashalic.

Pouqueville took advantage of his new situation by exploring the surrounding regions and by researching the sites of ancient Greece. He remained in Tripolitza through the harsh 1798 winter.

=== Constantinople: prisons and harems ===
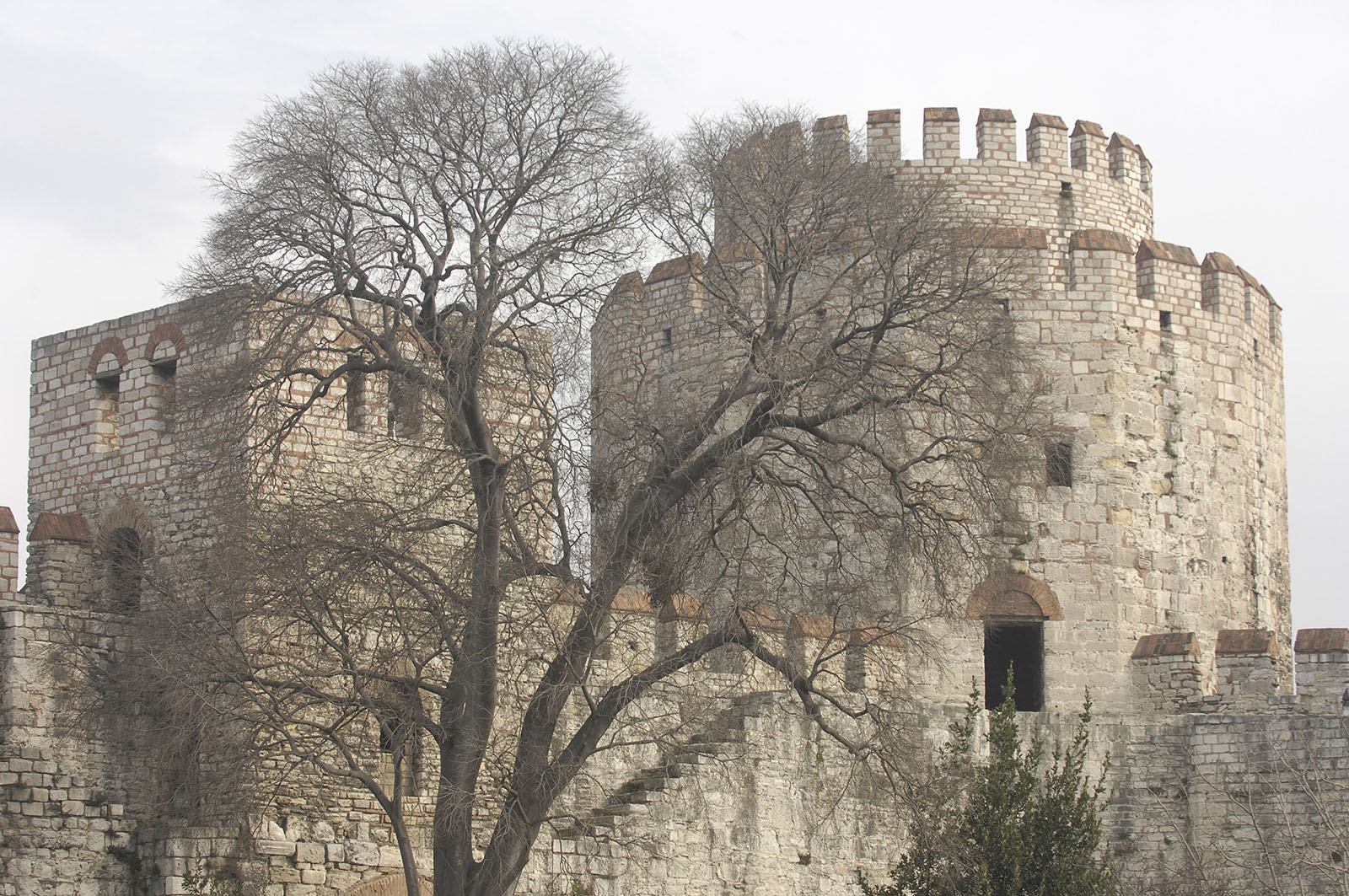
The Yedikule today

In the spring, the Sultan ordered that he be transferred with his co-prisoners to Constantinople, where they were incarcerated for two years in the Fortress of Seven Towers, Yedikule.

While living in abject conditions, Pouqueville wrote that they encountered members of the French embassy to whom the Sultan, under pressure from the British who had appropriated the embassy, had refused the usual diplomatic nicety of being confined in the French embassy palace.

Pouqueville tried saving the life of the dying Adjutant-general Rose, but it was too late. Rose had been France's representative in Epirus and had fallen victim to Ali Pasha of Ioannina's cruel perfidy. A few years later, he would be replaced by Pouqueville himself in Ioannina.

While imprisoned, Pouqueville befriended French diplomat Pierre Ruffin who had been held prisoner since the expedition of Egypt. Pouqueville attended to Ruffin's health, nicknaming him the Nestor of the Orient, with whom he perfected his knowledge of orientalism. The two men continued their correspondence long after their release until Ruffin's death.

Soon after arriving in Constantinople, Pouqueville gained some liberty of movement, as his jailers had learned about his medical skills. He succeeded in exploring the surroundings of the fortress, including the Sultan's private gardens at the Topkapı Palace. With the help of the Sultan's gardener, whom he had befriended, he even explored the garden of the Sultan's harem.

On occasions, he convinced his guards to let him travel through the City of Constantinople and along the Bosphorus all the way to the Black Sea. He sought to attend to other French prisoners who were gravely ill and held in a distant jail. At the time, the plague was still prevalent in the eastern Mediterranean region. Pouqueville was determined to find the proper medical method to fight the terrible disease. His thesis on his plague observations were later published in Paris upon his return and were highly regarded.

Pouqueville's written accounts of his time abroad were the first detailed description by a westerner of the Turkish megalopolis, its diverse inhabitants, and way of life, customs, and habits. These were received in Europe with great astonishment and curiosity because "The Gate of Asia" had previously remained practically unexplored by westerners since the Fall of Constantinople in 1453.

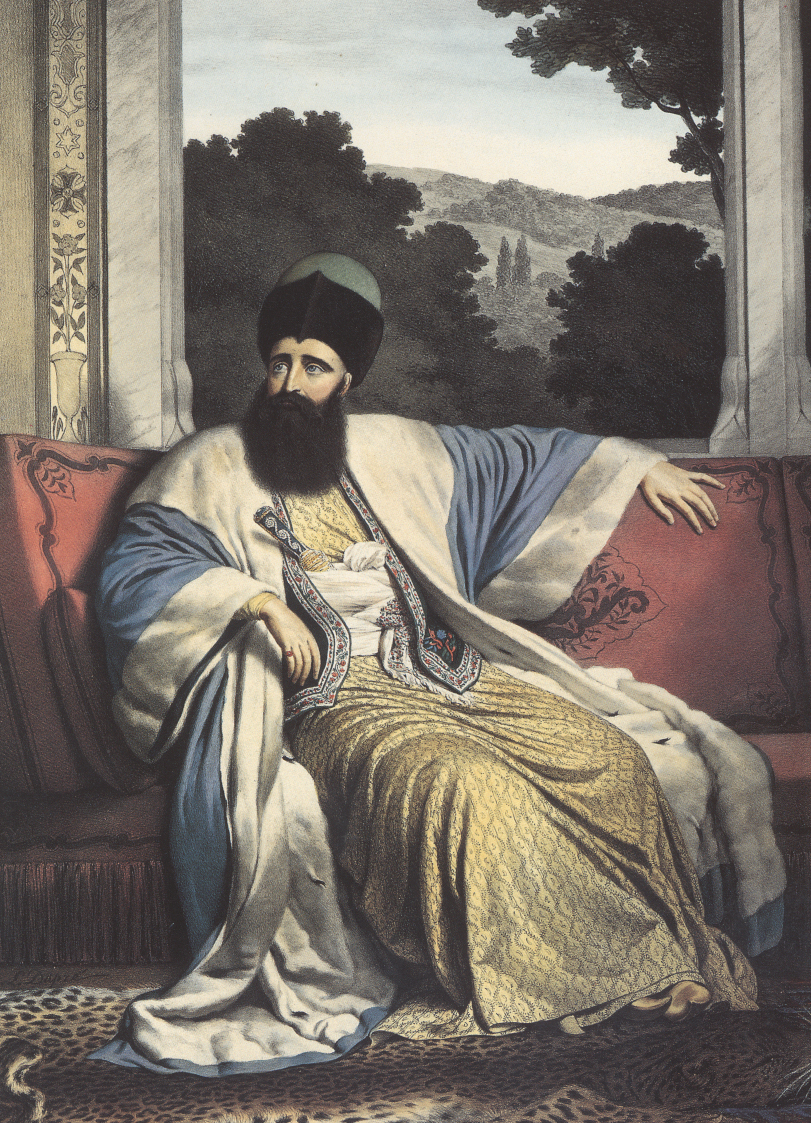
"Pasha" by Louis Dupré (1825)

While in jail, Pouqueville studied modern Greek and translated Anacreon. He wrote several oriental pieces like: The Pariah, a short humorous poem, La Gueuseade in four chants and in sestets, and a few lighter poems dedicated to Rose Ruffin.

Throughout his captivity, Pouqueville kept a journal written in a secret code that he had devised. He managed to keep it hidden from his guards, leading them instead to find and confiscate unimportant writings on their occasional searches of his cell. It is from this journal that he was able to write the first two parts of his book (nearly 600 pages) that he published in 1805.

His writings brought him fame and fortune. Part three of his book (about 300 pages) was devoted to the astonishing adventures that his friends and brothers in arms encountered before and after their release from the fortress of seven towers. Those friends included future baron and general Jean Poitevin, future general Charbonnel, and future consul-general Julien Bessières.

=== The emergence of Philhellenism ===
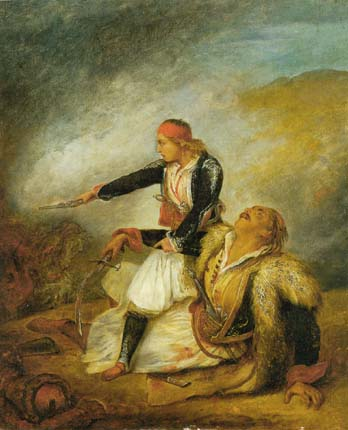
Greek boy defending his wounded father by Ary Scheffer, a French painter(1795–1858)

As a hostage of the Turks in Ottoman Greece in 1798, Pouqueville was uneasy with the Greeks who were among his Ottoman guards. Not unlike Lord Byron, who at his death in 1824 also became a symbol of philhellenism, Pouqueville felt at first unsure of the Greeks' sincerity.

However, during his work as the pashalic's physician in Tripolitza, he had fewer Turkish escorts. His more frequent contacts with Greeks made him see their rich culture in a new light. Even as it was being suppressed by the seven generations-long occupation by their Ottoman rulers, Greek social identity appeared to be very much alive to Pouqueville.

As a believer in the French revolution's humanism, he soon came to appreciate the Greek resurgence.

His condition as a prisoner of the Turkish Sultan prevented him from doing more than providing medical attention to the oppressed population, but his writings already showed both intellectual and emotional support.

His survey of Greece as early as 1798 is an early manifestation of the philhellene movement. This impulse soon spread throughout Europe with the publication of his books, motivating the greatest minds of the time to follow his steps across the newly revealed land of Greece.

As part of the broader break-up of the Ottoman Empire, the ancient nation's rebirth followed over subsequent decades with its war of independence and its liberation.

In 1801, twenty five months after being jailed in Constantinople, at the insistence of the French government and with the help from the Russian diplomats in Turkey, François Pouqueville was set free. He returned to Paris.

== Diplomat and archaeologist ==
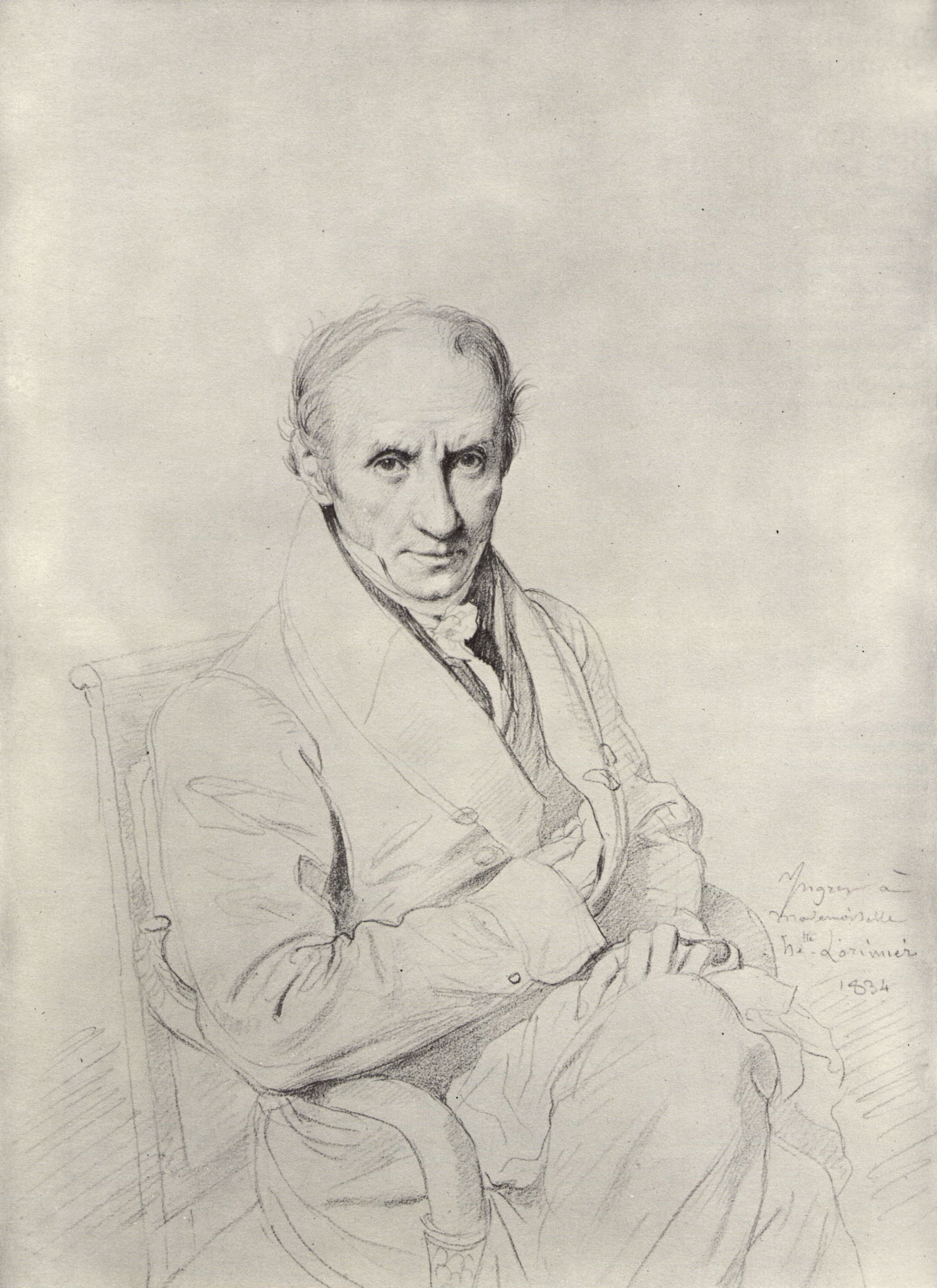
Portrait of François Pouqueville by Ingres (1834)

Upon his return, he submitted his doctorate thesis De febre adeno-nevrosa seu de peste orientali a work on the oriental plague that caused him to be nominated for the awards for the prizes of the decade.

However, his interests for literature and archaeology were now for Pouqueville as strong as his passion for medicine.

The publication of his first book "Travel to Epirus, to Constantinople, to Albania and to several other parts of the Ottoman Empire", dedicated to the Emperor Napoleon I and published in 1805, was a huge literary success internationally and also resulted in his nomination as Napoleon's consul general to the court of Ali Pasha of Ioannina.

His knowledge of the region and of the local languages made him the ideal diplomatic agent for Napoleon and his foreign minister Talleyrand.

Pouqueville accepted the post that would also enable him to pursue his studies of Greece.

=== Increasing conflict with Ali Pasha of Ioannina ===
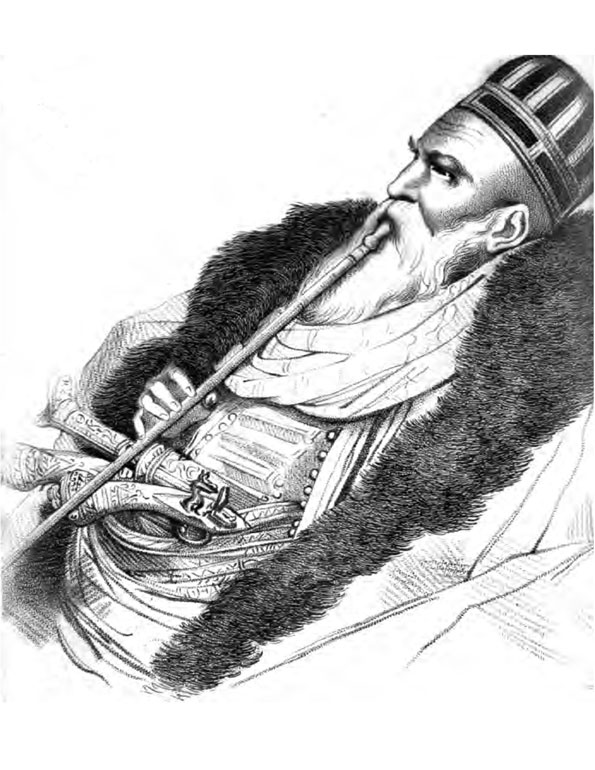
Ali Pasha after Louis Dupré, 1820

At first, he was welcomed by the famous pasha whom he accompanied on several of his excursions and who helped him discover his native Albania.

For a time, he was also accompanied by the British agent William Martin Leake in the course of several archeological surveys across Greece. Together, they reported many forgotten or previously unknown antique sites.

His diplomatic status enabled Pouqueville to explore Greece in its entirety; he traveled as far as Macedonia and Thrace.

He kept a detailed journal describing his observations and discoveries made in the course his numerous explorations of Greece and the Balkans during his 15 years of diplomatic service in Ioannina and in Patras.

In 1811, joined by his brother Hugues who had also been named consul in Greece, they researched and recorded the remains of no fewer than 65 antique cities in Epirus alone.

In 1813, he discovered in Actium a stone slab with Acarnanian inscriptions which he deciphered. It pertained to the time when the Roman armies appeared in Greece (c. 197 BC) and was a decree of the Senate and of the people of Acarnania proclaiming the brothers Publius and Lucius Acilius as their friends and benefactors.

In Ioannina, the court of Ali Pasha was increasingly the seat of political intrigues between the European powers and they were encouraged by the pasha himself. In this setting, Pouqueville was for years the target of disparaging and acrimonious critics from English visitors to Ioannina. These included Lord Byron with Hobhouse, and Cockerell, as they allowed themselves to be corrupted by the depraved lifestyle of the Court of Ioannina when Pouqueville instead demonstrated rectitude and firmness against Ali Pasha's criminal abuses of power.

Moreover, the literary and political fame he had acquired with the international success of his first book — dedicated to the Emperor Napoléon and positioning him, as early as 1805, as the spearhead of the emerging Greek revival movement — was evidently a cause for resentment on the part of the English.

However, after his visit to Ioannina, the distinguished Reverend T.S. Hugues wrote that he (unlike Byron and Hobhouse) "found him very polite, generous and humane, and thought him a scholar and man of the world, nor did that contest in which our respective countries were engaged, in the slightest degree repress his hospitality and attentions — an instance of good manners which would be surprising in the hate-ridden world of today."

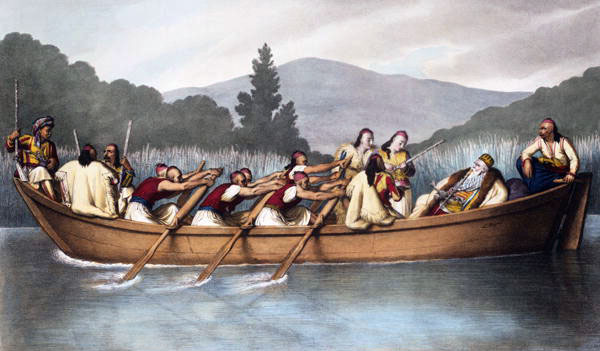
Ali Pasha hunting on the lake by Louis Dupré (1825)

However, after Napoleon's 1807 treaty of Tilsitt, which foreshadowed of the dismantling of the Ottoman Empire, Ali Pasha renounced his alliance with France and yielded to British pressures.

Pouqueville's frequent Philhellene positions and his constant opposition to Ali's rule made Pouqueville's situation progressively more dangerous. After Pouqueville had ordered French troops to join the Greeks of Parga in their successful defense against Ali's murderous hordes, he often had to remain in his house lest Ali Pasha would have him assassinated.

Thereafter, whenever he had an official communication for Ali, his brother Hugues (himself French consul in nearby Arta), had to bring it for him to the pasha whose atrocities he also witnessed throughout Epirus . In his memoirs, François Pouqueville concluded: "It was in this manner that the Turks, through their own excesses, prepared and fomented the Greek insurrection."

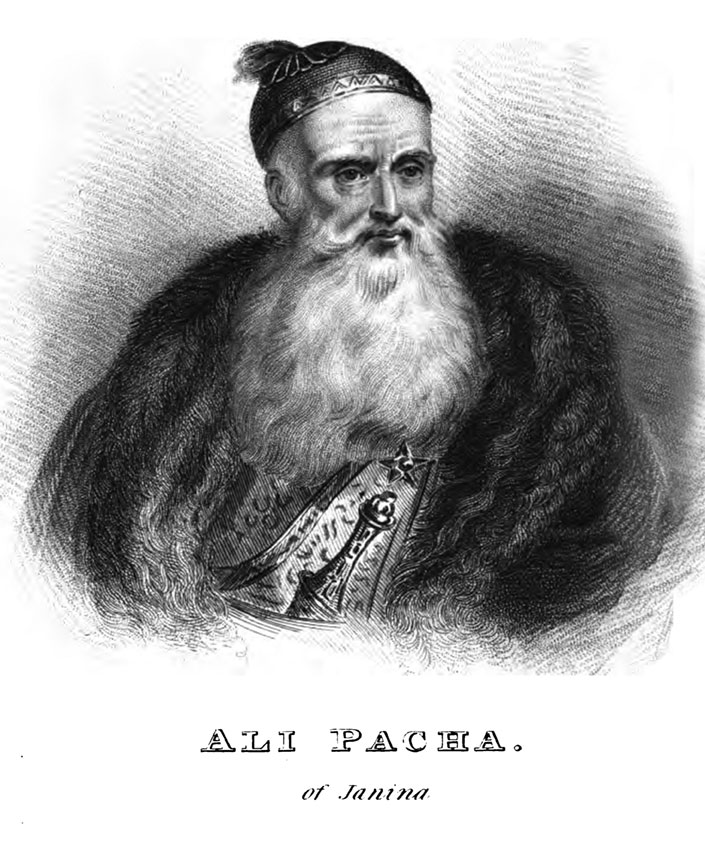
Ali Pasha

Finally, against Britain's continuous attempts to maintain and reinforce the Turks' brutal oppression of the Greeks, the brothers Pouqueville's consistent diplomatic skills succeeded in achieving the desired chasm between the Sultan and Ali Pacha, thus provoking the beginning of the dismantlement of the Ottoman Empire that would enable the regeneration of free Greek nationalism.

Soon, Ali Pacha would be disposed of by the Turkish emissaries from Constantinople and his severed head brought back to the Sultan.

With remarkable foresight due to his in-depth knowledge of the region, François Pouqueville already predicted the recurrent troubles that would subsequently divide the Balkans: "I will tell how Ali Tebelen Zade – Ali Pasha – after having created for himself one of these horrible reputations that will resound in the future, fell from power leaving to Epirus, his homeland, the fateful inheritance of anarchy, unfathomable damages to the Ottoman dynasty, the hope of freedom for the Greeks, and perhaps extended causes of conflict for Europe." (Histoire de la régénération de la Grèce, tome I, chapter 1.)

=== Patras and the Greek War of Independence ===
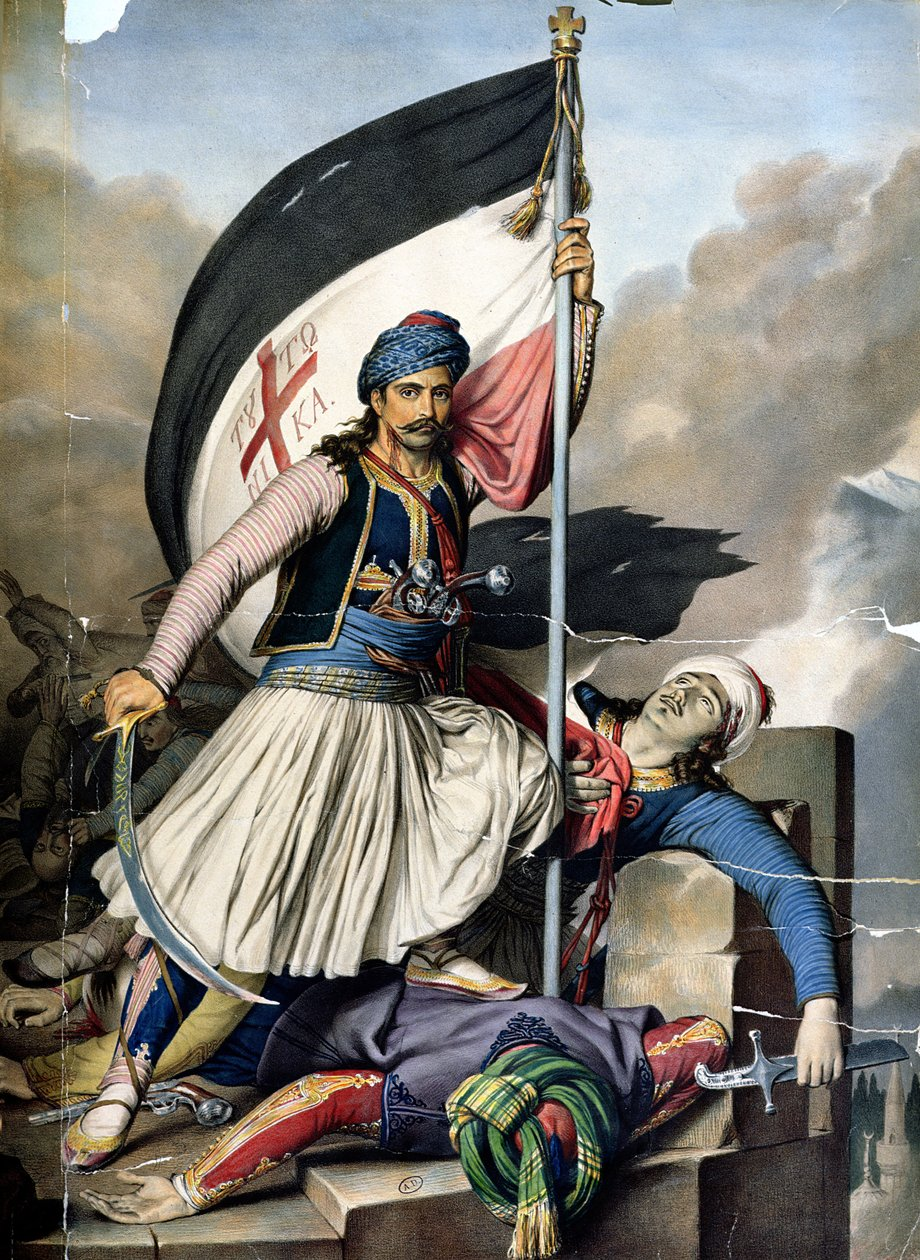
Uprising of Salona 1821, by Louis Dupré(1825)

After Napoleon's abdication in 1815, François Pouqueville left Ioannina and was sent as French consul to Patras until 1816, soon followed by his brother Hugues Pouqueville who replaced him as Consul.

They pursued their increasing contacts with the growing Greek rebellion, which culminated in the Greek War of Independence, declared on 25 March 1821 in the Agios Georgios chapel in Patras.

Unlike the British consul Green who refused to help the Greeks and collaborated with the Turks, the French consul Hugues Pouqueville gave shelter to many refugees of any side in the French consulate while the Turkish repression was raging.

His reports described these events as well as the destruction, which he qualified as devastating.(In his memoirs, Duke Pasquier, Chancellor of France, (1767–1862) wrote: "All the Greeks who were unable to escape from Patras were mercilessly slaughtered, regardless of sex or age. Only a few of the unfortunate victims could find refuge in the house of the consul of France, Mr Pouqueville. He saved them at the peril of his own life. This was the first example of the courageous self-sacrifice with which the French consuls fulfilled their duties.")

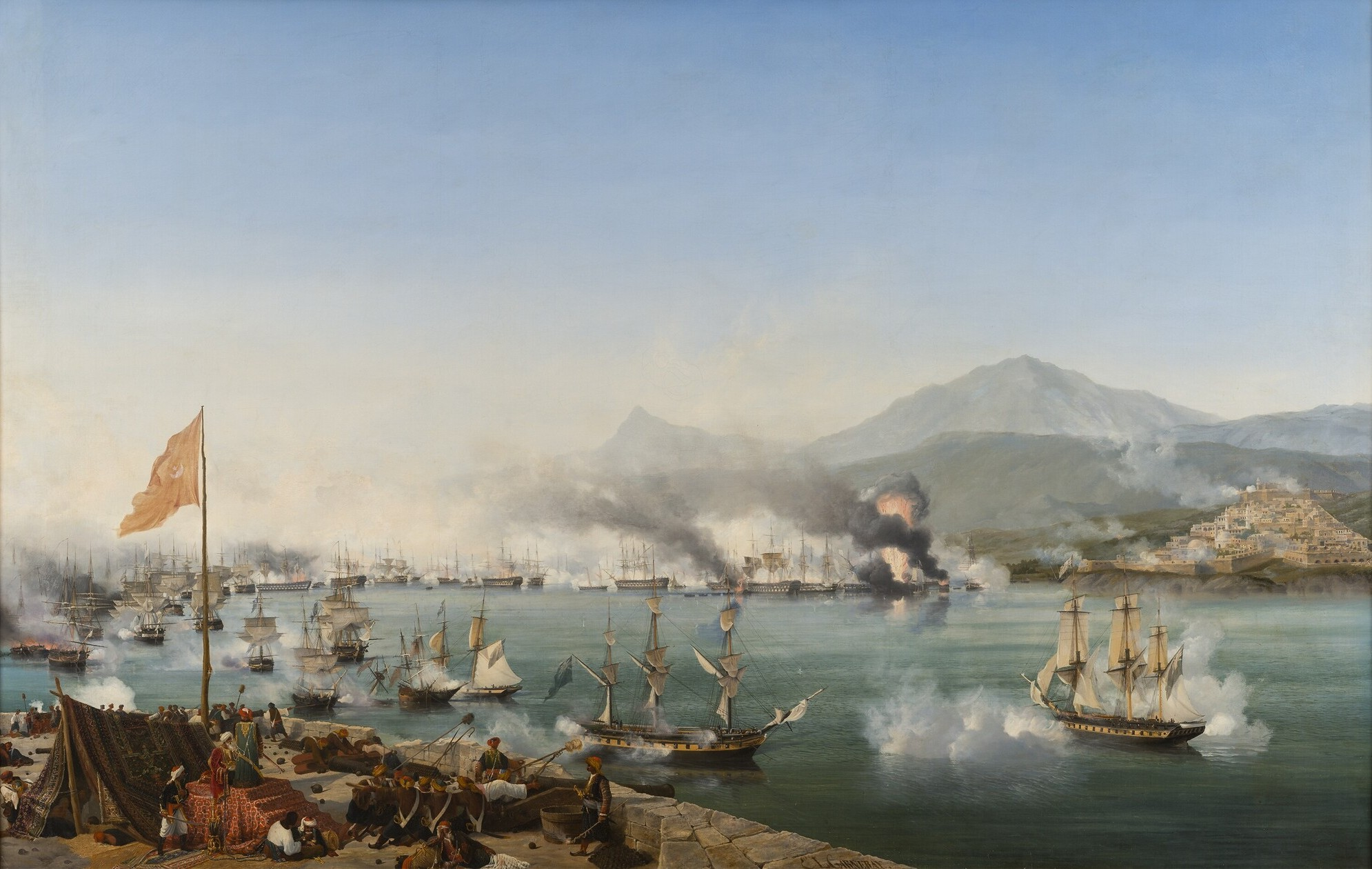
1827 Naval battle of Navarino by Garneray

In the end, the foreign legations who had been supportive of the Greeks were forced to leave the country, and Pouqueville returned to France.

While enjoying his retirement from international diplomacy, François Pouqueville saw his support for the Greek war of independence provide some of the impetus for the French navy taking part in the Battle of Navarino on 20 October 1827. This naval victory sealed the fate of 360 years of Turkish occupation of Greece. In 1828, French troops expelled the Turkish garrison that had been holding the Patras citadel. This occurred on the shores of Navarino, where, 30 years before, Pouqueville had been put in chains, to be imprisoned by the Turks, and where he took his first steps on Greek land.

As to the fate of the pirate Orouchs –who had seized Pouqueville and sold him as a slave– he later boasted about his capture to Ali Pasha when Pouqueville was still in residence in Ioanina. At first, he was well rewarded with the command of one of Ali's ships; but later, and although Pouqueville had granted him his pardon, the pasha found an excuse to have the pirate impaled.

== Return to Parisian life ==
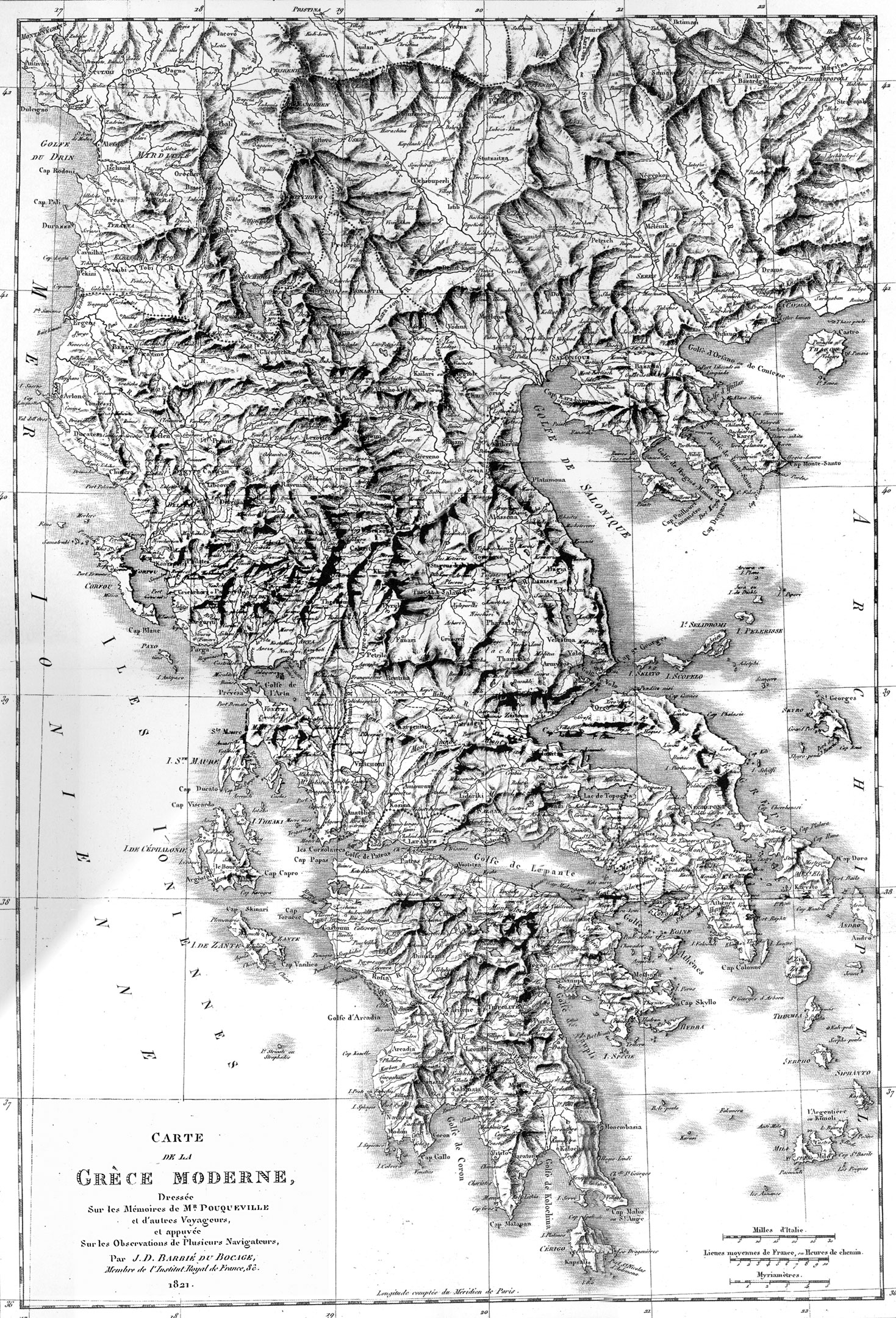
map of Greece made by Barbié du Bocage (1821)

=== Honors ===
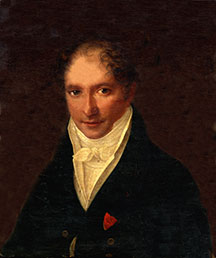
François de Pouqueville c.1811

Upon his return to France, François Pouqueville was awarded a seat at the Academie des Inscriptions et Belles Lettres.

He was elected member of the Institut d'Égypte, honorary member of the Paris' Academy of Medicine, associate member of the Royal Academy of Marseille, member of the Ionian Academy of Corcyre , member of the Society of Sciences of Bonn, and Knight of the Legion of Honor.

=== Writer of the regeneration of Greece ===
While writing about antique Greece in the numerous major works and articles he published from this moment, François Pouqueville mostly applied himself in denouncing the state of oppression crushing the Greeks under Turkish domination, and more specifically stood as witness of "the crimes and abominations perpetrated by Ali Pacha and his bands of assassins with the complicity of the Turkish Sultan and his allies."

All along, he described the daily life, the usages and customs, and the traditions of the Greeks of the Peloponnese surviving under their appalling economic and political conditions.

His observations became a powerful support for the cause of the Greek rebellion and its dramatic events, which he reported faithfully in substantial books that were quickly published and translated in several languages.

They had a considerable influence throughout Europe as it was gained by the ideas of the French Revolution.

His books also gave a precise and detailed description of the geography, archaeology, topography, and geology of the areas he traveled through, visited, or heard of and his observations were highly regarded by later explorers and by the geographer Jean-Denis Barbié du Bocage, author of a fine atlas attached to Barthelemy's Voyage du jeune Anarcharsis en Grèce dans le milieu du quatrième siècle avant l'ère vulgaire, and who was a founder of the Société de Géographie in 1821.

He is now generally considered as unreliable, because of his habit of mixing his own observations and mere hearsay, and his fictionalized treatment of history; William John Woodhouse notes that he transforms "history into childish fable".

For his services to their Country, the Greeks honored him with the award of the Order of the Savior.

"To M. Pouqueville" were the dedications by prominent French poet Casimir Delavigne of two of his Messeiennes, odes to the combats for freedom.

The epitaph engraved in the marble of François Pouqueville's grave proclaims, in French and in Greek: "With his writings he contributed powerfully to the return of their antique nationality to the oppressed Greeks"

=== Intellectual and artistic social life ===
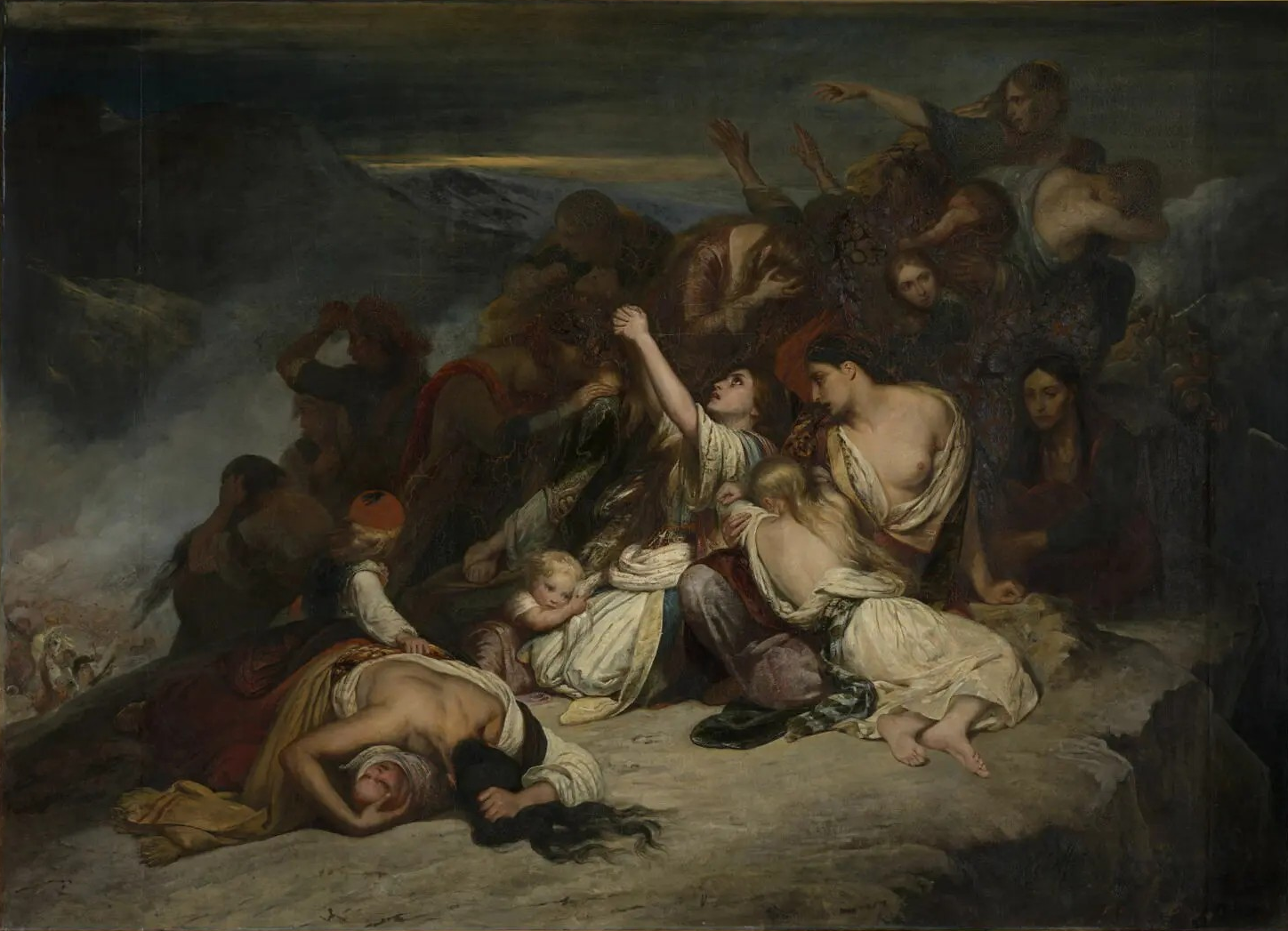
The Women of Souli by Ary Scheffer (1827)

He became a member of the Parisian gentry and was a regular at many salons, such as Countess of Ségur's, who portrayed him in one of her best sellers Quel amour d'enfant! as the affectionate and humoristic character, Monsieur Tocambel.

He befriended many artists and intellectuals such as Chateaubriand, whom he inspired and guided, as early as 1805, to visit Greece and Egypt. He also frequented physicists Arago and Ampère, and the novelist, Alexandre Dumas, who paid him homage in the book he wrote about Ali Pasha.

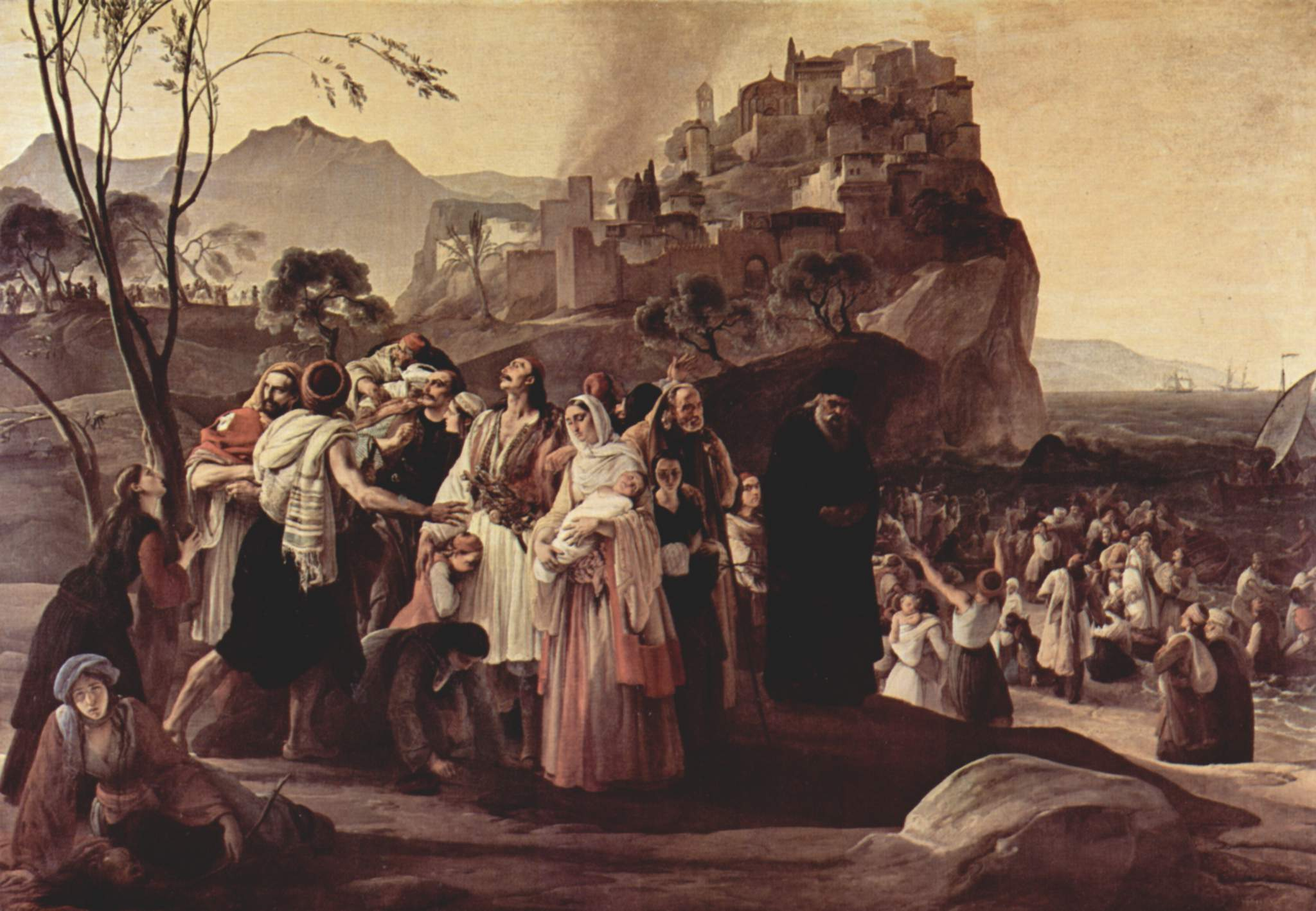
the Parga betrayal by Francesco Hayez

The chapter he wrote about the massacre of the Souliots perpetrated by Ali Pacha in 1804 and published in his book History of Greece's regeneration (1824) inspired playwright Népomucène Lemercier to write "The martyrs of Souli or the modern Epirus" a tragedy in five acts (Paris, 1825), and Romantic painter Ary Scheffer to paint The Women of Souli (1827).

His writings on the outrages inflicted upon the inhabitants of Parga when the city was abandoned by the British to Ali Pacha's cruelty in 1818 also inspired a major painting by Italian romantic painter Francesco Hayez (1791–1882).

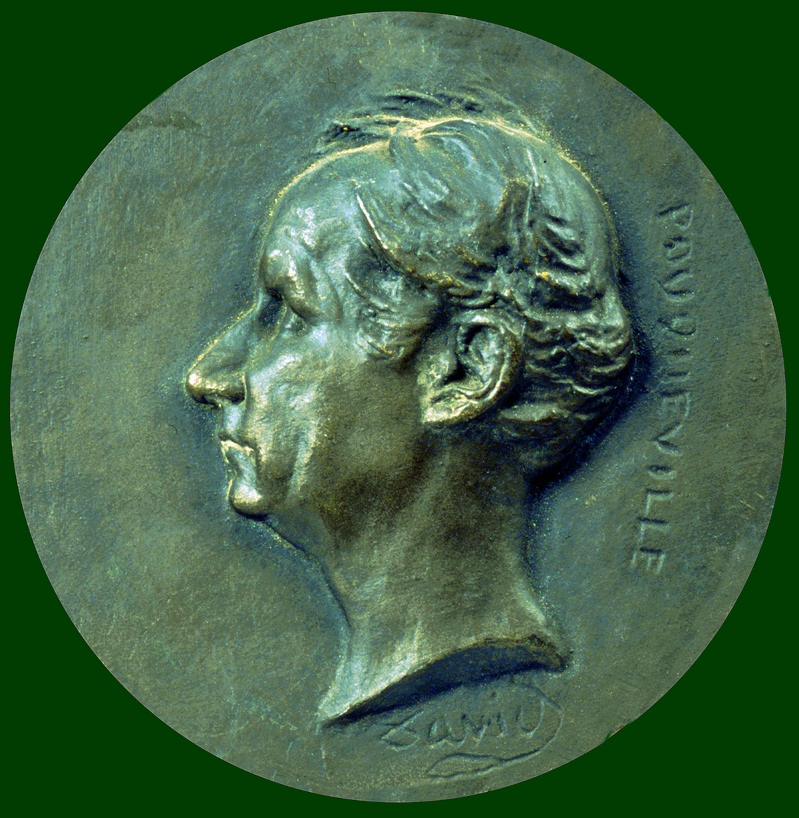
bronze sculpture of Pouqueville by David d'Angers

== Final years and death ==
François Pouqueville's life companion was the popular painter-portraitist Henriette Lorimier. Master painter Ingres, who was one of their friends, also painted his portrait in 1834.

Pouqueville, aged 68, died peacefully at their residence at 3, rue de l'Abbaye in Paris on 20 December 1838. His grave at the Montparnasse cemetery is ornamented with an effigy made by one of his closest friends, the sculptor David d'Angers.

== Works ==
- Voyage en Morée, à Constantinople, en Albanie, et dans plusieurs autres parties de l'Empire Ottoman (Paris, 1805, 3 vol. in-8°), translated in English, German, Greek, Italian, Swedish, etc. available on line at Gallica
- Travels in Epirus, Albania, Macedonia, and Thessaly (London: Printed for Sir Richard Phillips and Co, 1820), an English denatured and truncated edition available on line
- Prisonnier ches les Turcs & Le Tigre de Janina Romans et Aventures Célèbres – Edition Illustrée – La Librairie Illustrée, Paris 8 c. 1820
- Voyage de la Grèce (Paris, 1820–1822, 5 vol. in-8°; deuxième édit., 1826–1827, 6 vol. in-8°), his capital work
- Histoire de la régénération de la Grèce (Paris, 1824, 4 vol. in-8°), translated in many languages. French original edition available on Google books
- Mémoire historique et diplomatique sur le commerce et les établissements français au Levant, depuis l'an 500 jusqu’à la fin du XVII siècle, (Paris, 1833, in-8°)
- La Grèce, dans l'Univers pittoresque (1835, in-8°) available on line at Gallica
- Trois Mémoires sur l'Illyrie
- Mémoire sur les colonies valaques établies dans les montagnes de la Grèce, depuis Fienne jusque dans la Morée
- Notice sur la fin tragique d'Ali-Tébélen (1822, in-8°)

== Sources ==
- Monmerqué, Biographie universelle Michaud
- Jules Auguste Lair, La Captivité de François Pouqueville en Morée, Recueil des publications diverses de l'Institut de France, Paris, 1902
- Jules Auguste Lair, La Captivité de François Pouqueville à Constantinople, 1800–1801 : (9 prairial, an VII −16 ventôse, an IX), H. Delesques, Bulletin de la Société des Antiquaires de Normandie, Caen, 1904;
- Tobias George Smollett, The Critical Review, Or, Annals of Literature ~ online:
- J. Rombault, François Pouqueville, membre de l'Institut, Bulletin de la Société historique et archéologique de l'Orne, 1887
- Auguste Boppe, L'Albanie et Napoléon, 1914
- Henri Dehérain, Revue de l'histoire des colonies françaises, une correspondence inédite de François Pouqueville, Edouard Champion Publisher, Paris 1921
- New York Graphic Society, INGRES Centennial Exhibition 1867–1967, Greenwich, Connecticut, 1967
