= Henriette Lorimier =

French artist (1775–1854)

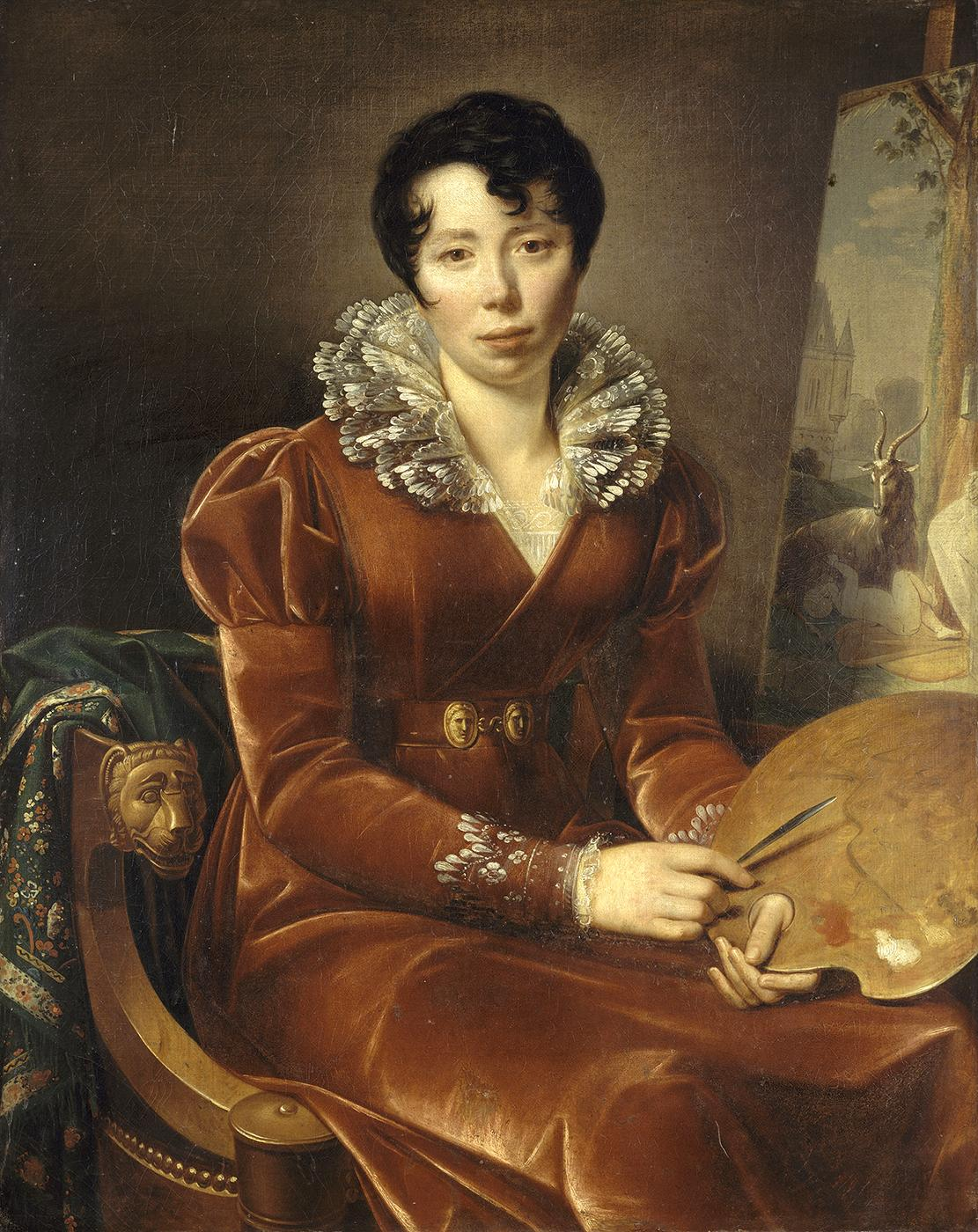
- Self-Portrait (1807); Museum of Dijon
- Born: 7 August 1775; Paris, France
- Died: 1 April 1854 (aged 78); Paris, France
- Occupation: Painter - Portraitist

Elisabeth Henriette Marthe Lorimier (7 August 1775, Paris – 1 April 1854) was a popular portraitist in Paris at the beginning of Romanticism.

She lived with the French diplomat and philhellene writer Francois Pouqueville (1770–1838).

== Education and inspiration ==
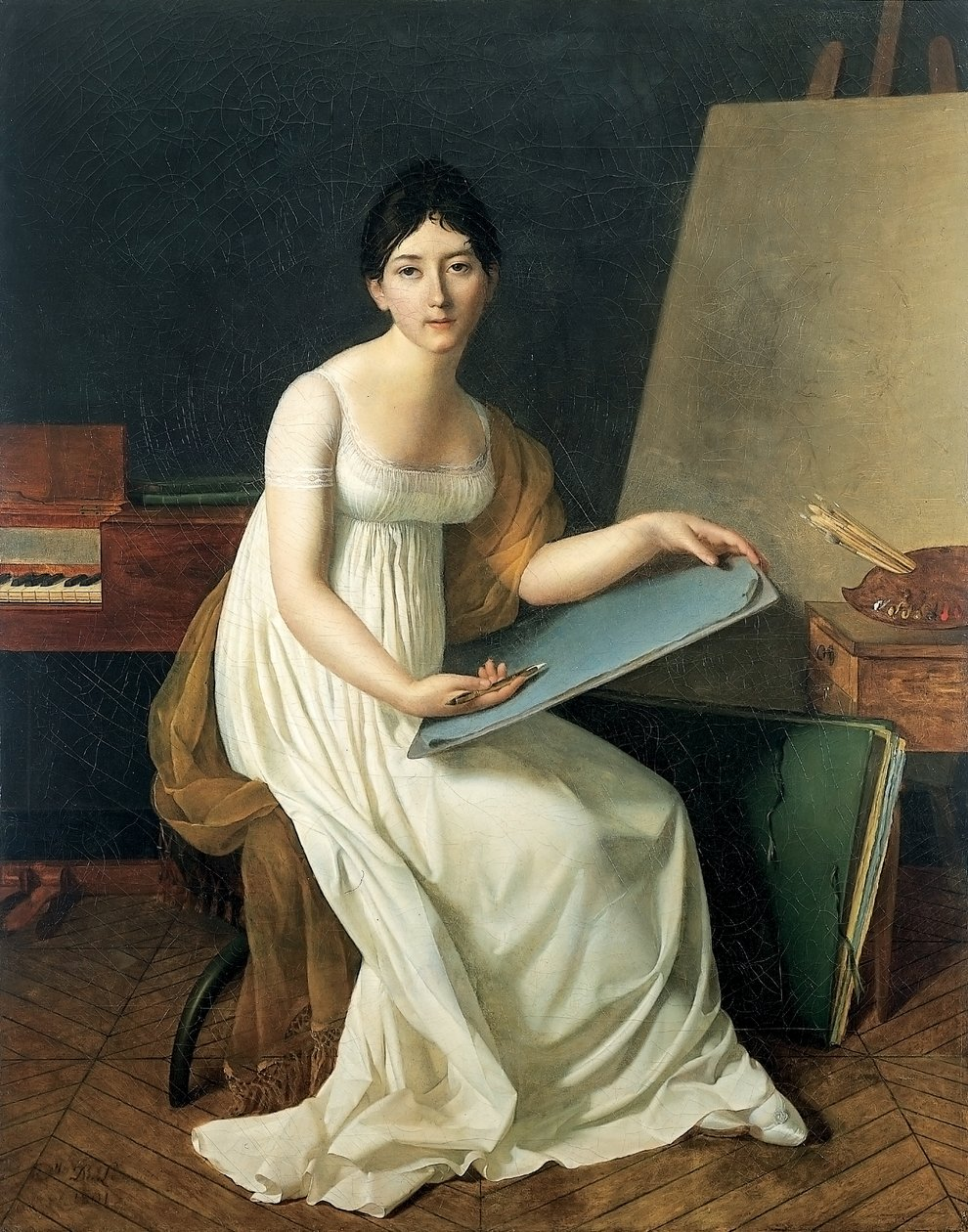
Autoportrait, 1801

A student of the history painter Jean-Baptiste Regnault, she soon exhibited fine portraits and genre paintings at the Paris' Salons from 1800 to 1806 and from 1810 to 1814.

In 1805 Princess Caroline Murat-Bonaparte, a sister of the Emperor, purchased "La Chèvre Nourricière" a painting exhibited at the 1804 Salon and at the 1806 Salon Henriette Lorimier was awarded a First Class Medal for her painting of "Jeanne de Navarre" which was then purchased by the Empress Josephine de Beauharnais, consort of the Emperor Napoleon Ier. The painting is still displayed at Josephine's Chateau de la Malmaison to this day.

== Parisian celebrity ==
=== Jeanne de Navarre ===
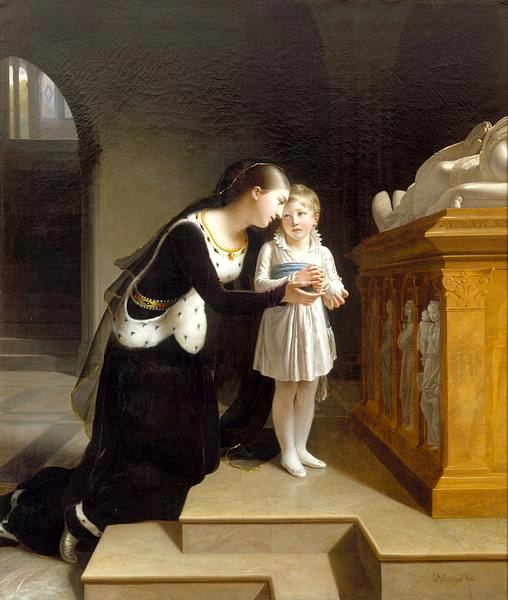
Jeanne de Navarre and her son, 1806

The painting depicts Jeanne of Évreux-Navarre, daughter of Charles II (King of Navarre) and widow of Jean V of Montfort Duke of Brittany who died in 1399 and whose third spouse she was. She is here with her second son, Arthur, future Duke of Brittany. It is considered as exemplifying the mother, inasmuch as the Duchess fulfills her educational duty towards her son and teaches him filial piety.

Exhibited at the 1806 Salon, this painting gained an immense success. Empress Joséphine purchased it outright for her paintings gallery at the Malmaison castle where it remained until her death in 1814. It is now on permanent display in the Empress' music room.

It is one of the first examples of the painting style known as 'Troubadour' which was brought to fashion by Alexandre Lenoir who created in 1795 the Museum of the French Monuments where were shown in a chronological order the statues and French monuments saved from the destructions of the Revolution. Thousands of visitors went dreaming there in front of the tombs of the great people of the past gathered in just one place, until 1816 when the museum was closed on order of Louis XVIII.

Although it was a historical subject, Jeanne de Navarre did not demonstrate the "noblesse de style" required of a history painting, and thus did not threaten the status quo. "Jeanne de Navarre" was described as a lesson for all mothers because the Duchess is shown fulfilling the duty of instructing her son in filial piety. For many critics this painting was an example of the success that a woman could obtain within the confines of genre painting. The author of a Salon review that appeared in Mercure de France commended Henriette Lorimier for not departing from the graceful subjects in which her sex had the advantage.

An article published in l'Atheneum, however, confirmed the necessity of her remaining in the domain of genre painting: "We venture to promise her still greater success if she wants to confine herself to painting the sweet emotions of the soul, tender and delicate sentiments, in short, to represent scenes of domestic life, and leave to men historical subjects."

=== La chèvre nourricière ===
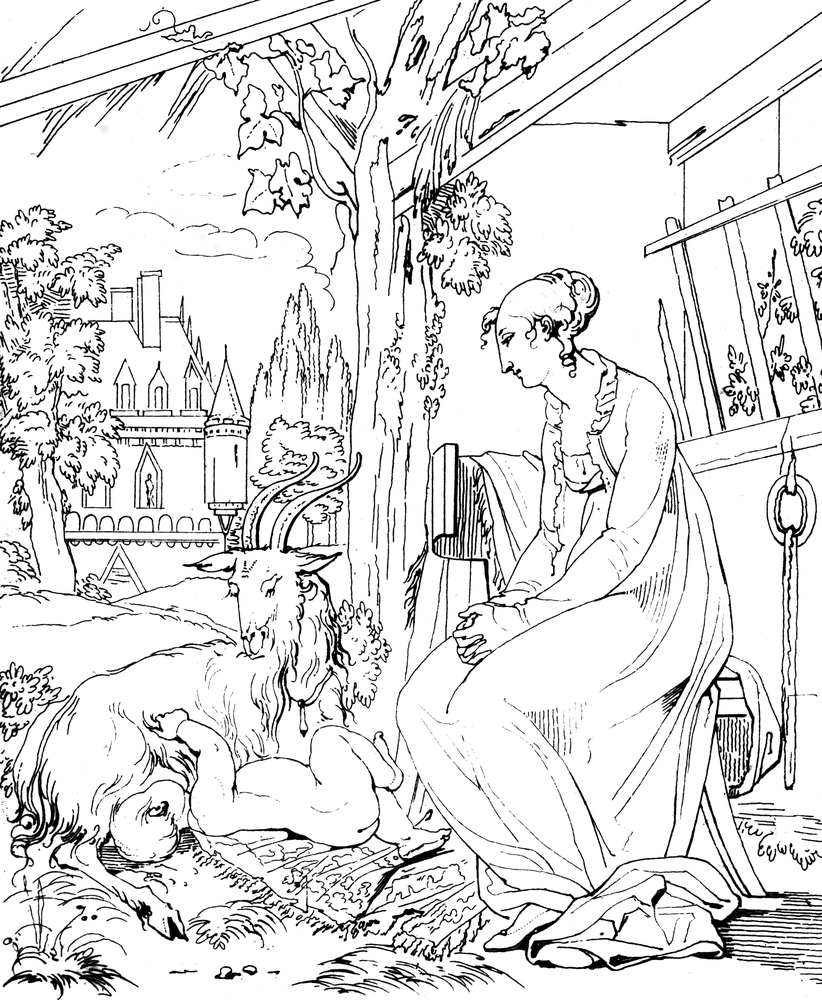
La Chèvre Nourricière (The Nursing Goat), print after Lorimier's painting

However, her first painting that was commented upon was La Chèvre Nourricière (The Nursing Goat) which represents a young mother who is unable to nurse her child, sadly watching a goat performing this service (partly visible in the background of her autoportrait on the top right). Critics claimed that this scene of maternal love and regret could only have been painted by a woman and confirmed the appropriateness of such subjects for women painters. This praise has to be considered in its context in 1804 and with the fact that the painting was purchased in 1805 by Caroline Bonaparte, wife of Prince Murat, and that, obviously, Henriette Lorimier and her paintings were projected in the limelight of Paris at the time of l'Empire.

This rise in celebrity culminated with the purchase of her second major painting by the Empress herself in 1807.

== Artistic and intellectual social life ==
Francois Pouqueville at Ioannina (Chateau de Versailles)

At that time, Henriette Lorimier met Francois Pouqueville who had just returned from his adventures as a prisoner of the Ottoman Empire, and she concentrated on studying and perfecting her painting technique until she felt ready again to exhibit her newer work by 1810. They lived together until his death in 1838.

The couple was frequently seen in the various "salons" where the intellectual and artistic gentry of Paris was meeting, notably at the Comtesse de Segur's salon. They befriended many influential figures of the Empire and of the Restoration, such as Chateaubriand, Alexandre Dumas, Ingres, Arago, and David d'Angers, to name but a few.

== Works (partial) ==
- Autoportrait, 1801,
- Une jeune fille, près d'une fenêtre, pleurant sur un passage d'Atala, 1802,
- La Chèvre nourrice, 1804,
- Autoportrait, 1805,
- Portrait de Sophie Regnault, 1805,
- Jeanne de Navarre, 1806,
- Portrait de Madame Desmaret, 1807,
- L'Enfant reconnaissant (The Grateful child), 1810, Consulate General of France, New York City (in the Pink Room)
- Portrait de feu M. Joseph Delaleu, 1812,
- Portrait de la marquise de Reinepont, 1816,
- Portrait de Nicolas Lupot, Luthier,
- Portrait de Madame de Margolis,
- Portrait de François-Charles-Hugues-Laurent Pouqueville, 1830,
- Portrait de Céleste Buisson de Lavigne, vicomtesse de Chateaubriand, 1840.

=== Some portraits by Henriette Lorimier ===
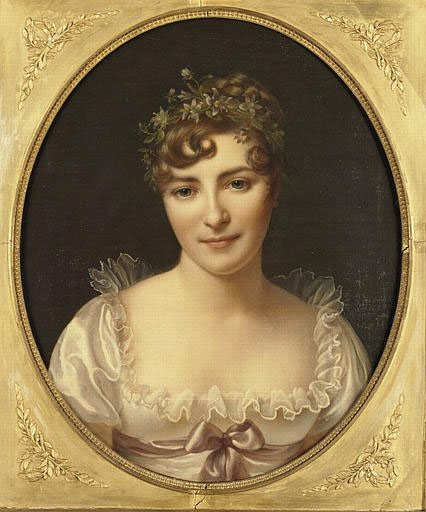
Mme de Margolis, Museum of Grenoble

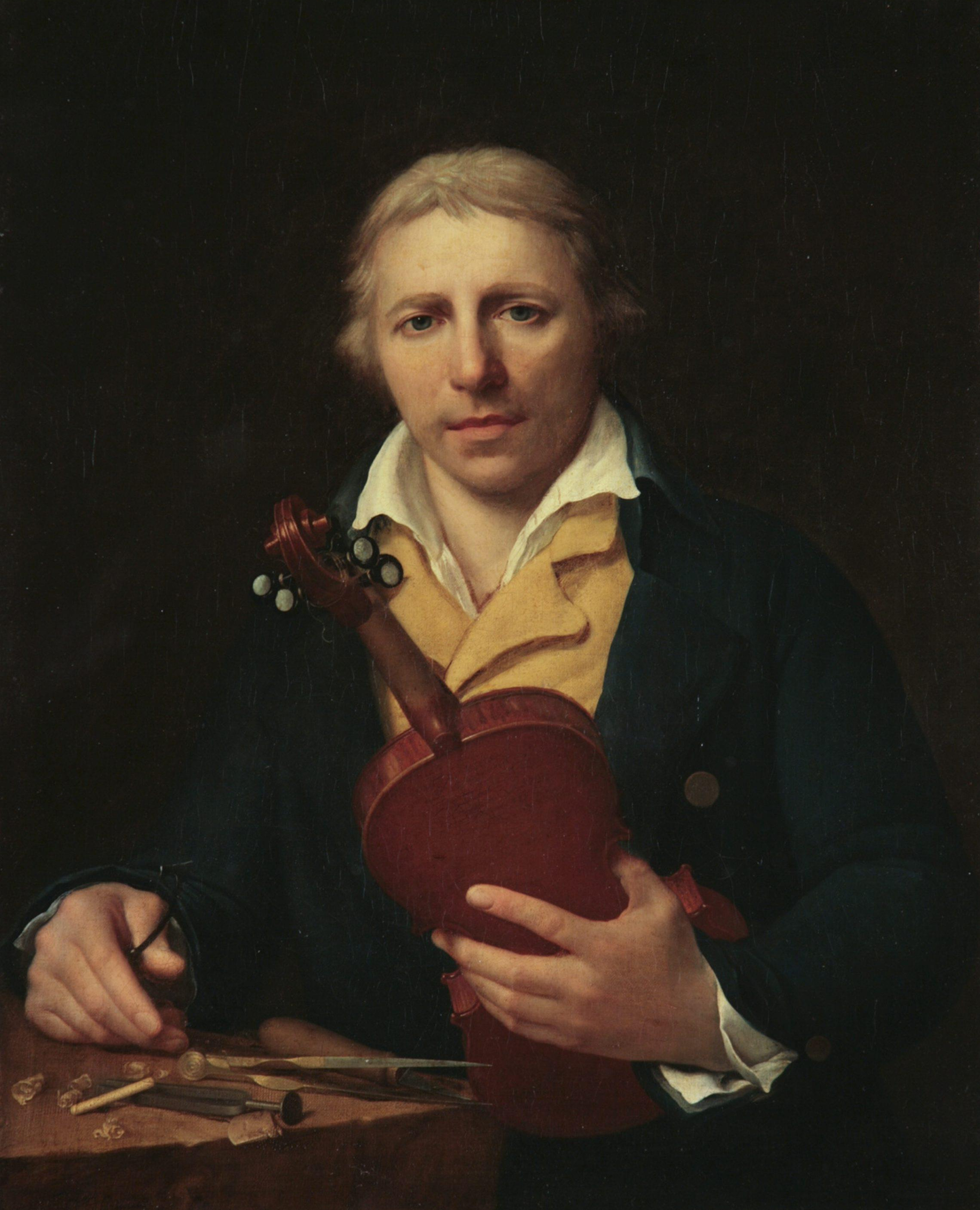
Luthier Nicolas Lupot, musée de la musique

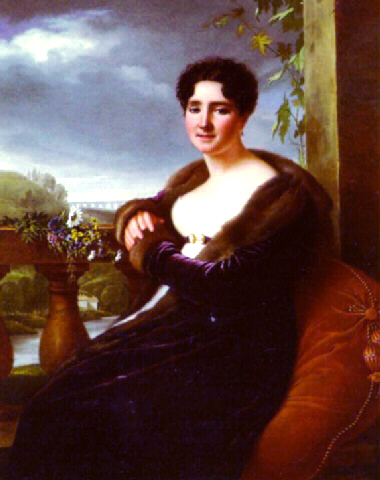
Marquise de Reinepont, 1817

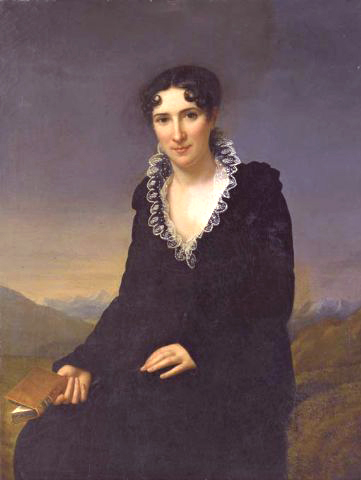
Madame Desmarets, 1807

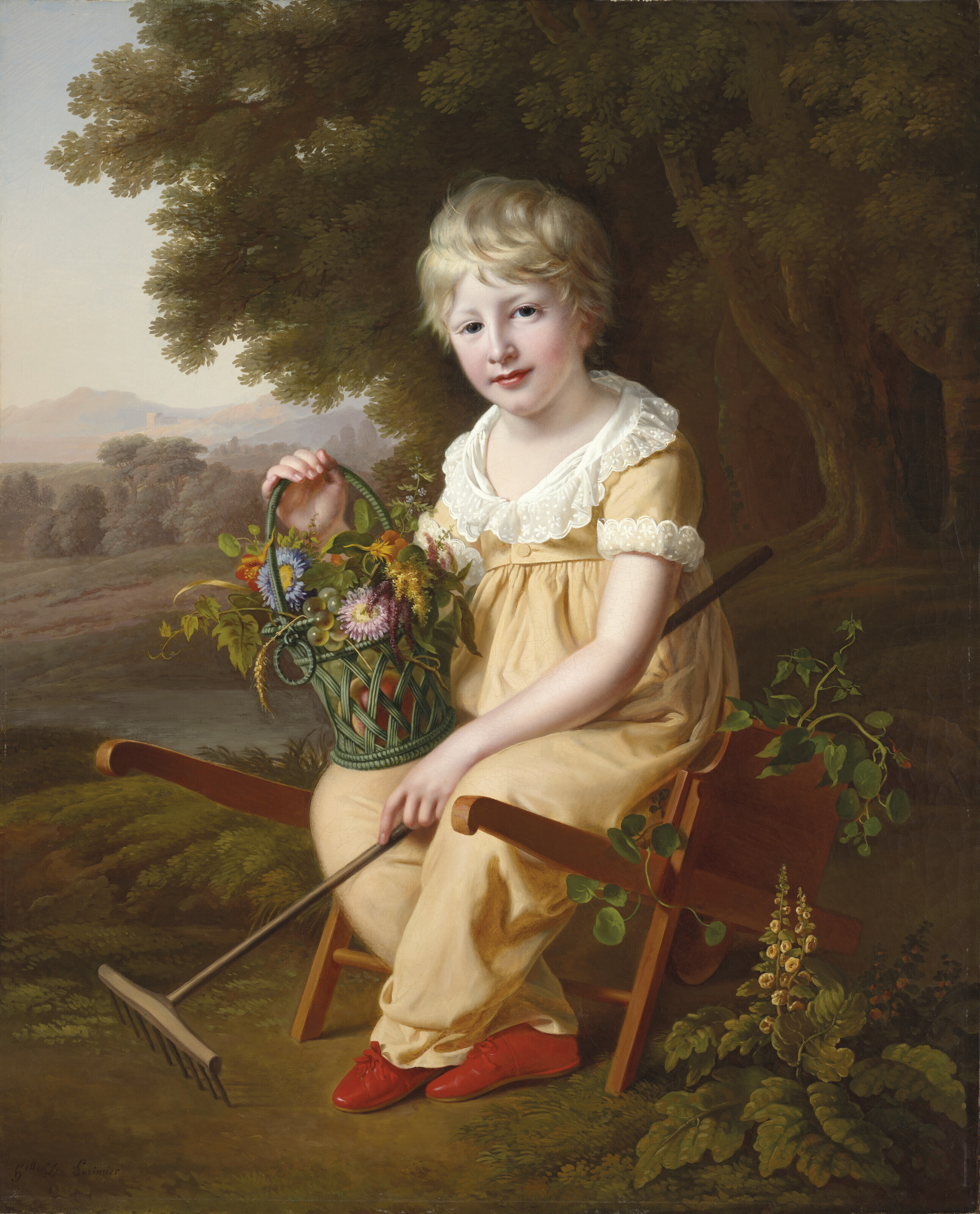
Portrait of Émile Alexandre César Le Fébure de Sancy de Parabère (1800-1863), as a little gardener, 1808

== Bibliography ==
- Magnin, Musée Magnin. Peintures et dessins de l'école française, Dijon, 1938 (n° 498 (attribué à Haudebourg-Lescot)
- F. Pupil, Le style troubadour, Nancy, 1985 (p. 501 (H. Lorimier)
- A. Pougetoux, Peinture troubadour, histoire et littérature : autour de deux tableaux des collections de l'Impératrice Joséphine, Revue du Louvre, n° 2, 1994, p. 51-60 (p. 53, fig. 2 (H. Lorimier)
- A. Pougetoux, Un autoportrait d'Henriette Lorimier, Bulletin de la société des amis des musées de Dijon, n° 1, 1995, p. 47-51" (p. 47-51, fig. 1 (H. Lorimier)
- I. Julia et J. Lacambre, in cat. exp. Les années romantiques, Nantes, Paris, Plaisance, 1995-1996 (p. 468 (répertoire Haudebourg-Lescot)
- L. Starcky, Les Peintures françaises, catalogue sommaire illustré, Dijon musée Magnin, foreword by Emmanuel Starcky, with the participation of Hélène Isnard, Paris 2000 (n° 340, p. 134 repr. (H. Lorimier)
- Denton, Margaret, A Woman's Place: The gendering of genre in post-revolutionary French Painting, History, 21, 1998, p. 219-246
- Gabet, Charles, Dictionnaire des artistes de l'école française au XIXe siècle, Paris, 1831, p. 457
- Oppenheimer, Margaret, Women Artists in Paris: 1791-1814, Ph. D. dissertation, Institute of Fine Arts, New York,199
- Les Chefs-d'œuvre du Musée de Grenoble
