= History of Patras =

History of the Peloponnesian city

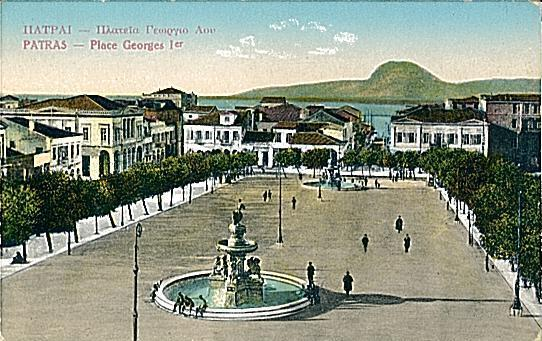
The central square of Patras, Plateia Georgiou I as it was at the beginning of the 20th century.

The city of Patras has an important history of four thousand years. Patras has been inhabited since the prehistoric age and constituted an important centre of the Mycenean era. In antiquity it was a leading member of the Achaean League. Patras reached the peak of its power in the Roman era, when an imperial colony was founded there by Augustus. In the Byzantine period it remained a commercial city. The town experienced repeated conquests from Franks, Venice, Byzantines and finally the Ottomans. Later on, it played a leading part in the Greek revolution of 1821, the first revolt of which in Greece, broke out in Patras. In 19th century Greece, it was the indisputable centre of the Peloponnese, an important export harbour, and a cradle of the emerging Greek middle class. In the 20th century the city developed as a commercial and industrial hub and in spite of its overshadowing by Athens, it is now the third city of Greece and the most significant economic pole of Peloponnese and West Greece.

== Antiquity ==
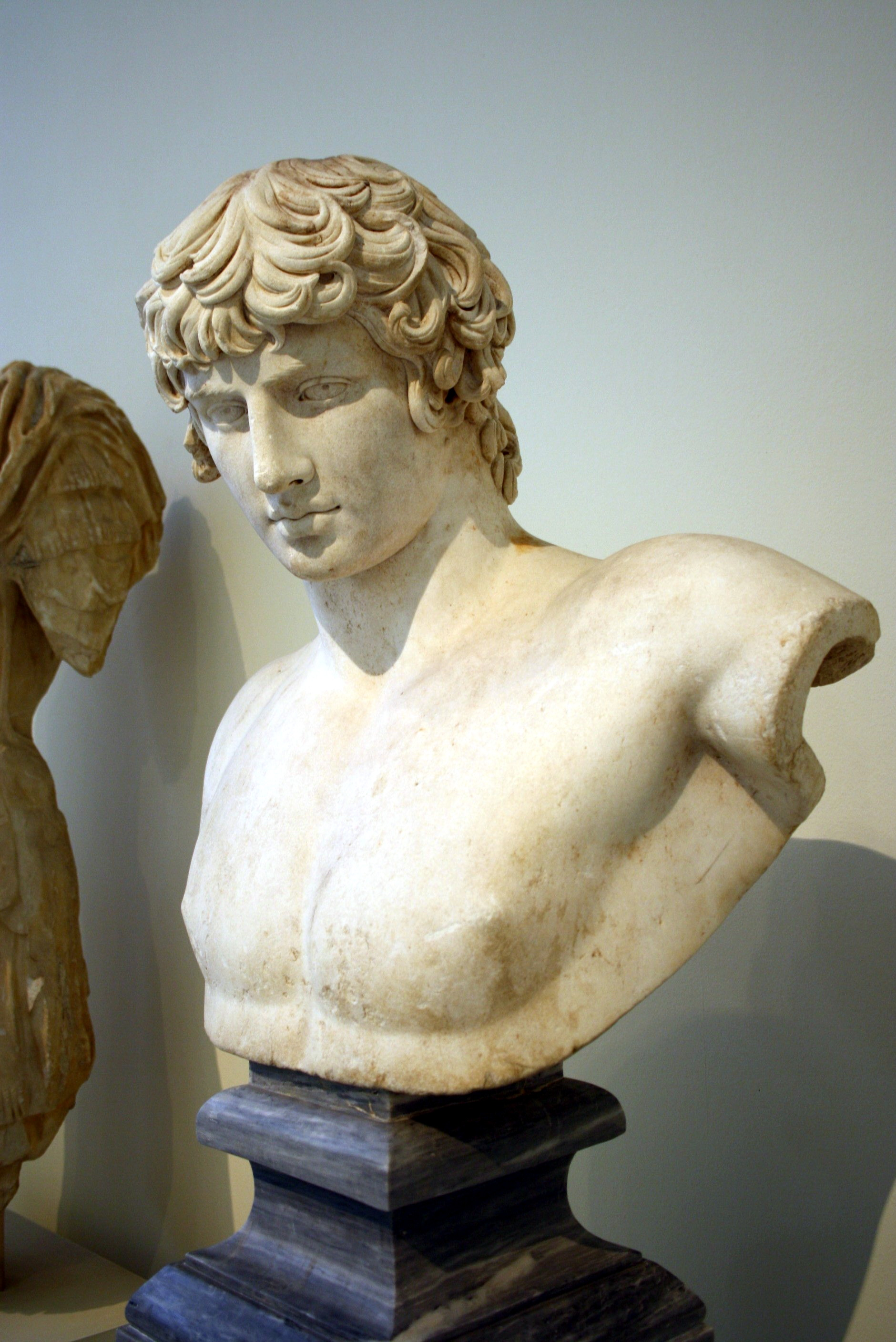
A bust of Antinous found in Patras (130-138 CE). It is kept in the National Archaeological Museum of Athens.

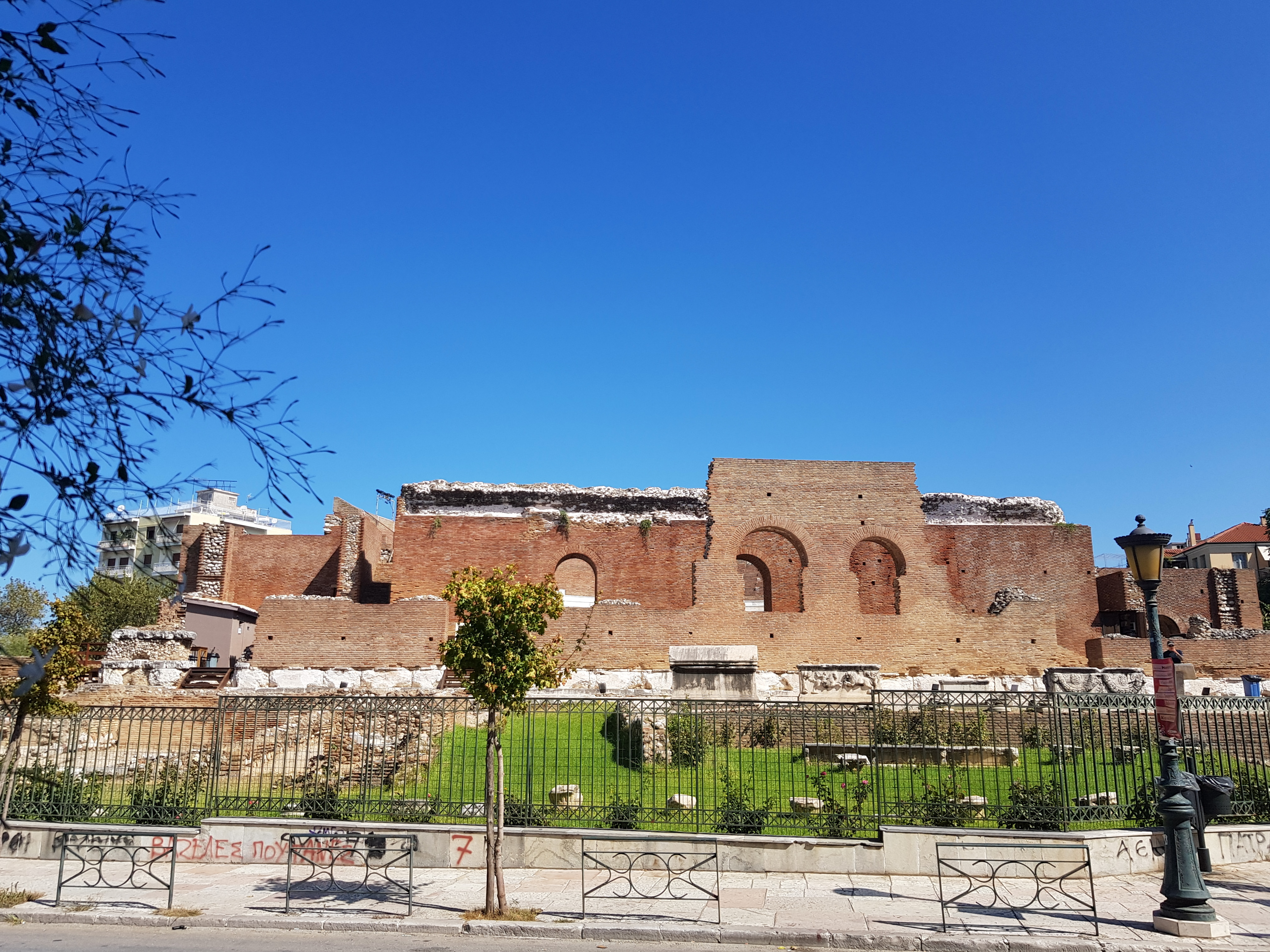
The Roman Odeon of Patras

The first traces of settlement in Patras date to the 3rd millennium BC, in modern Aroe. During the Middle Helladic period (the first half of the 2nd millennium BC) another settlement was founded in the region.

=== Late Bronze Age ===
Patras flourished for the first time during the Post-Helladic or Mycenean period (1580–1100 BC). Ancient Patras was formed by the unification of three Mycenaean villages located in modern Aroe, Antheia and Mesatis. The foundation of Patras goes back to prehistoric times, the legendary account being that Eumelus, having been taught by Triptolemus how to grow grain in the rich soil of the Glaucus valley, established three townships, Aroe (i.e. "ploughland"), Antheia ("the flowery"), and Mesatis ("the middle settlement") united by the common worship of Artemis Triclaria at her shrine on the river Meilichus.

=== Iron Age ===
Mythology further tells us that after the Dorian invasion, a group of Achaeans from Laconia, led by the eponymous Patreus, established a colony. The Achaeans, having strengthened and enlarged Aroe, called it Patrae, as the exclusive residence of the ruling families, and it was recognized as one of the twelve Achaean cities.

=== Classical Age ===
During antiquity, Patras remained a farming region but in Classical times it became an important port. In 419 BC the town was, on the advice of Alcibiades, connected with its harbour by long walls in imitation of those at Athens.

=== Roman era ===
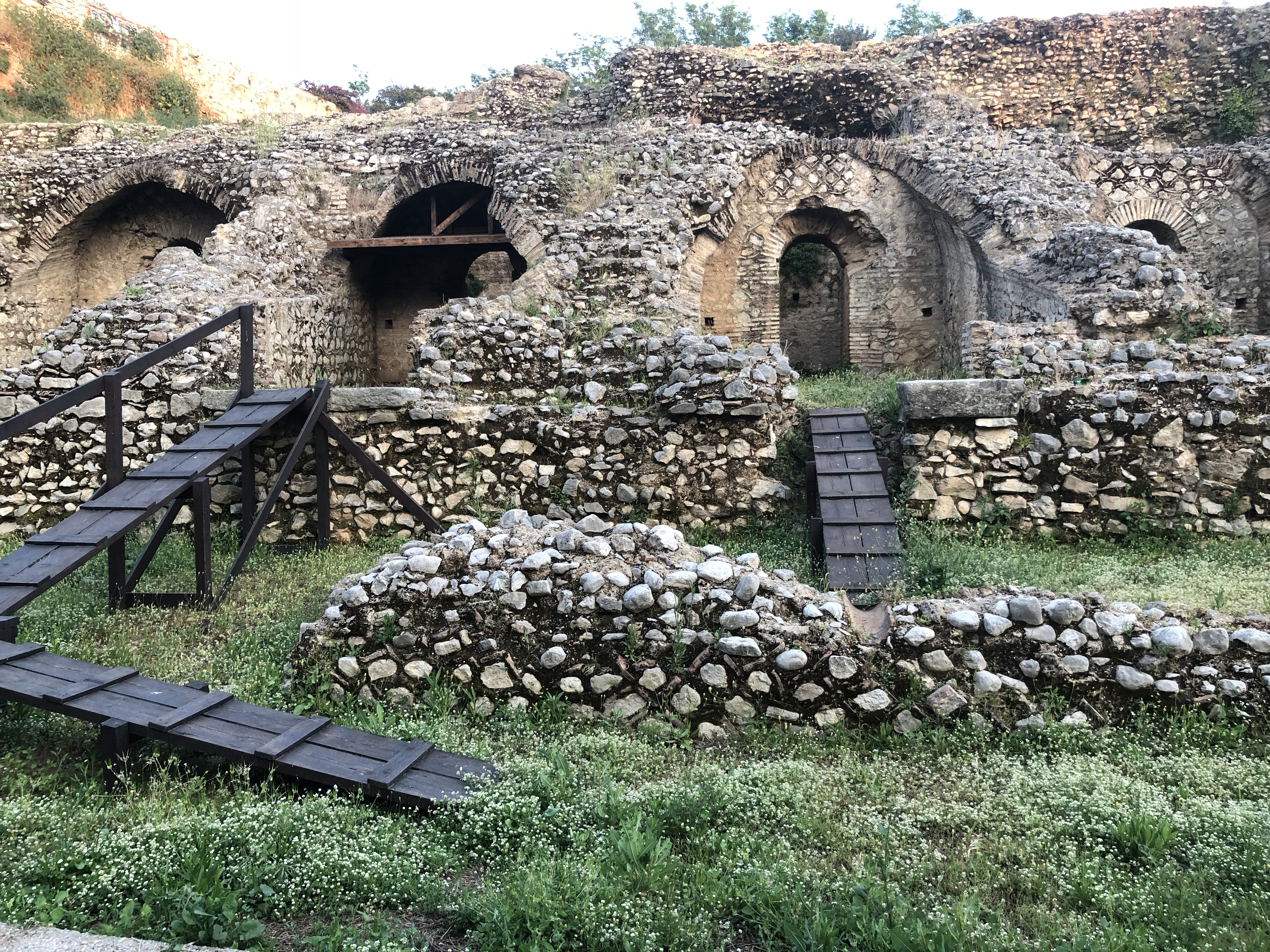
Ruins of the Roman stadium

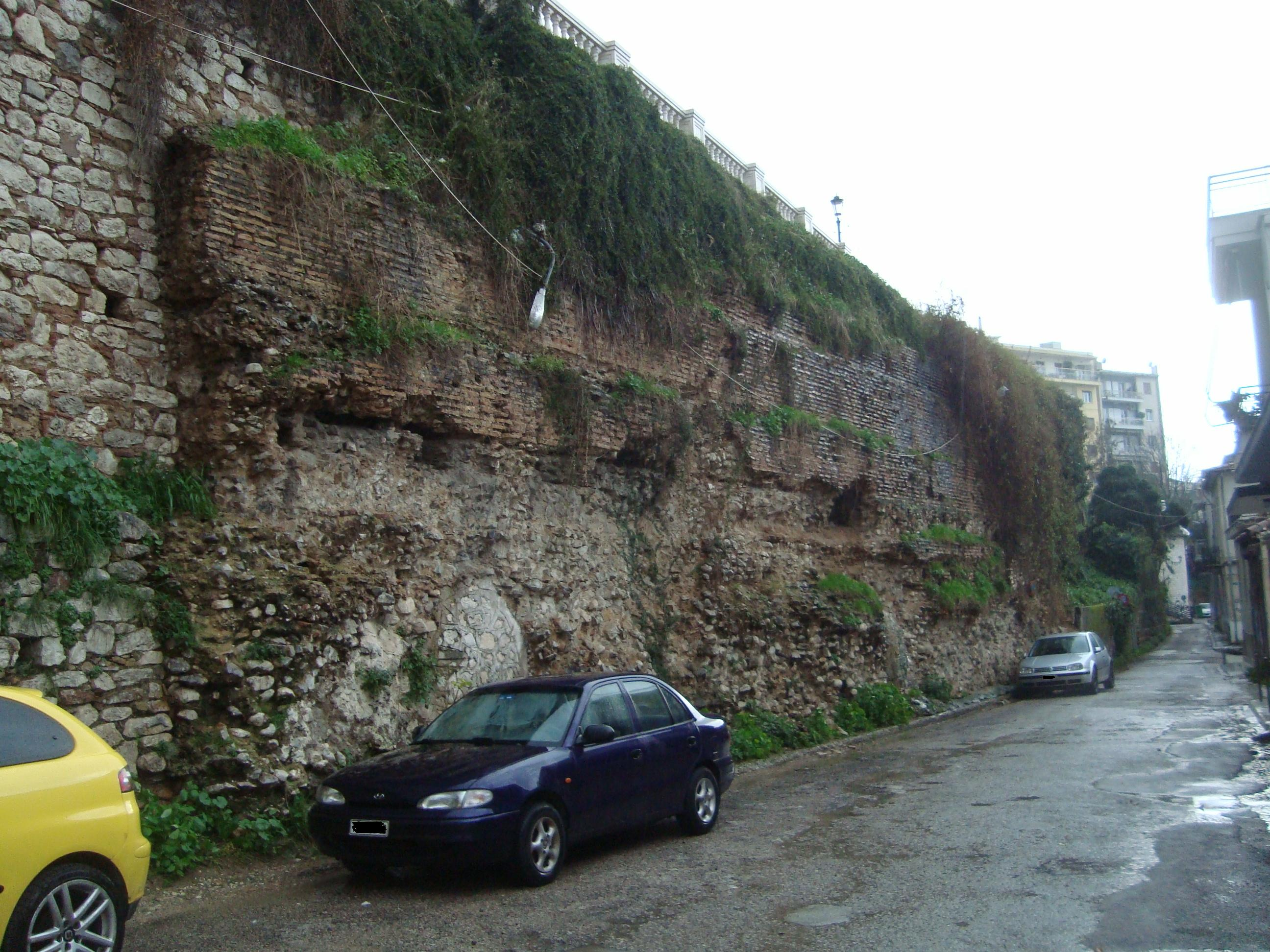
Roman retaining wall, Tsamadou street

After 280 BC, and prior to the Roman occupation of Greece, Patras played a significant role in the foundation of the second "Achaean League" (Achaike Sympoliteia) together with the cities Dyme, Triteia and Pharai. As a consequence, the initiative of political developments was transferred for the first time to western Achaea. However, the League's armed force was destroyed by Quintus Caecilius Metellus Macedonicus after the defeat of the Achaeans at Scarpheia in 146 BC, and many of the remaining inhabitants forsook the city. After the Battle of Actium Augustus restored the ancient name Aroe, established a military colony of veterans from the 10th and 12th legions (not, as is usually said, the 22nd), and bestowed the rights of colonists on the inhabitants of Rhypae and Dyme, and all the Locri Ozolae except those of Amphissa.

Colonia Augusta Achaica Patrensis (CAAP) became one of the most populous of all the towns of Greece, and acquired a cosmopolitan character. Its colonial coinage extends from Augustus to Gordian III. A cadastral map was drawn up, privileges were granted and foreign religions introduced, and crafts were created, the most important being that of earthen oil lamps which were exported almost to the whole world of that time. Patras built new temples and two industrial zones, and paved its streets with flagstones. New roads rendered the city a communication center.

The Golden Ass of Lucius Apuleius, one of the most well-known works of Latin literature, was said to be adapted from a lost Greek original by a Lucius of Patrae - of whom little is known, but who presumably lived at the city in this period.

At the end of the 3rd century AD, the city fell into decline, probably because of a strong earthquake that struck the whole of northeastern Peloponnese in AD 300.

==== Saint Andrew ====
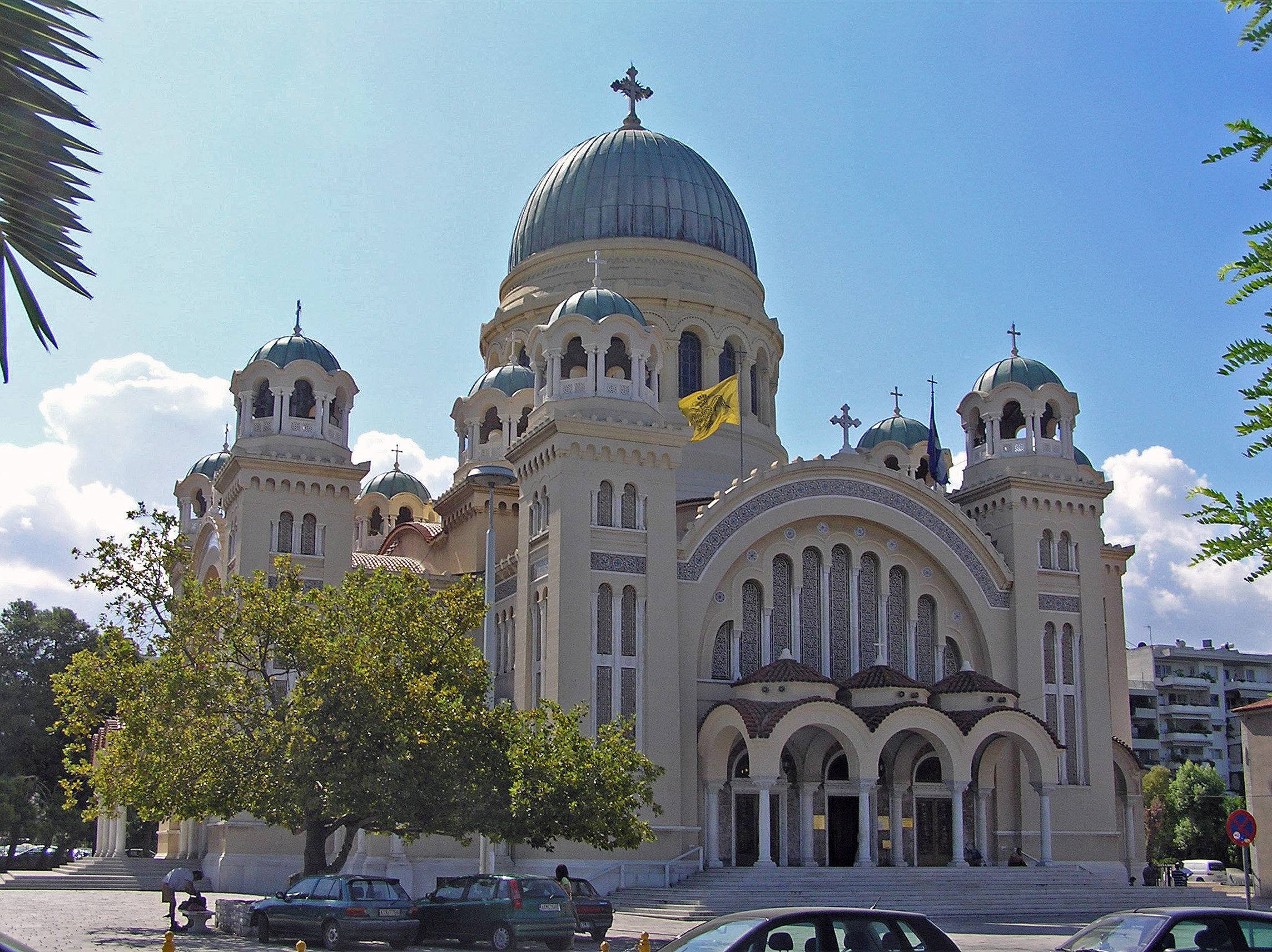
Saint Andrew of Patras

According to the Christian tradition, Saint Andrew came to Patras to preach Christianity during the reign of Emperor Nero and was crucified as a martyr. He is ever since considered to be the patron saint of the city. Two temples built in his honor, an old Byzantine-style basilica and a new monumental church, completed in the 1970s, mark the traditional place of his crucifixion. The new Saint Andrew Church is also the largest Orthodox church in the Balkans. Like Corinth, it was an early and effective centre of Christianity; its archbishop is mentioned in the lists of the Council of Sardica in 347.

== Byzantine era ==
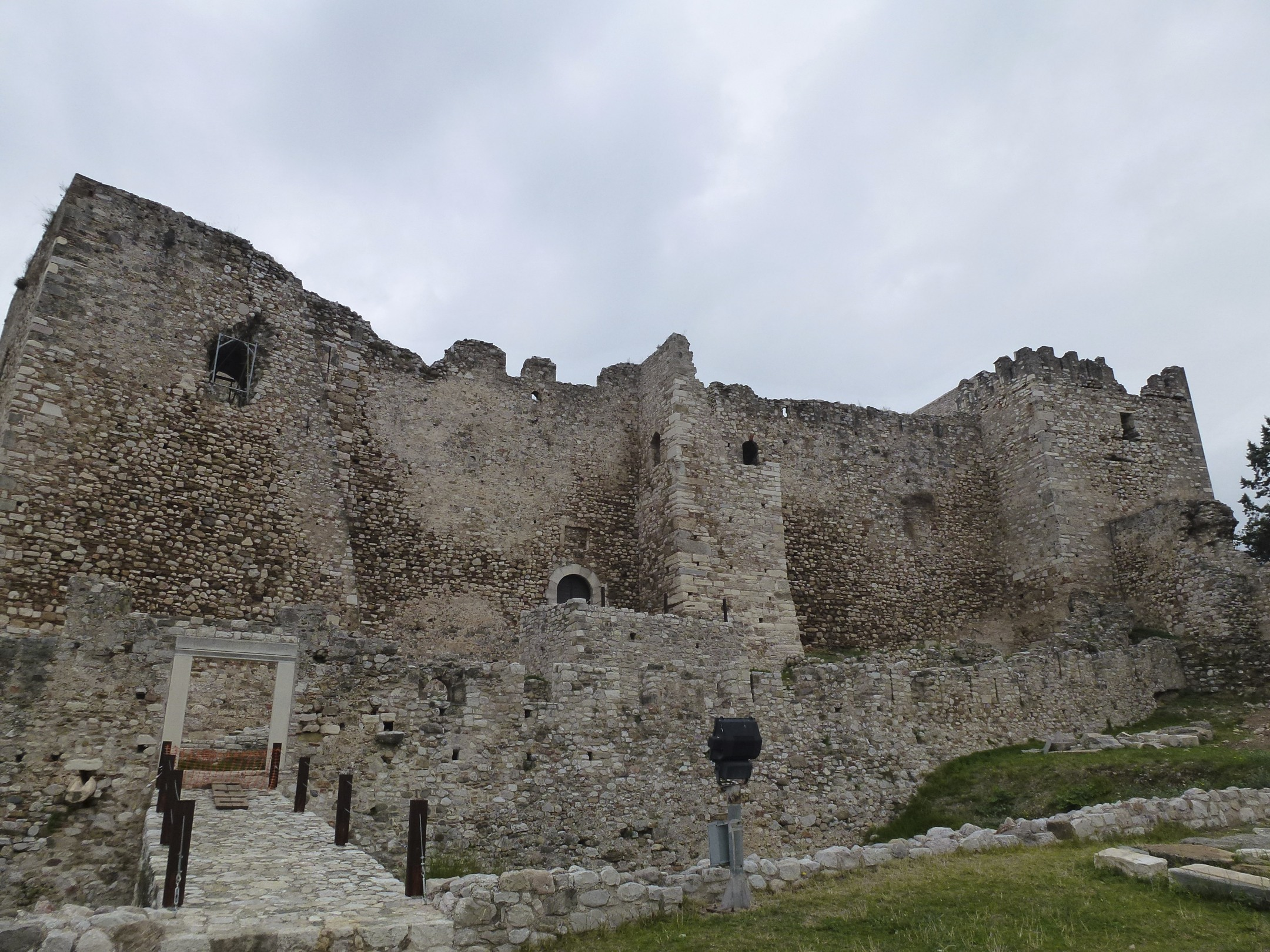
View of the Byzantine Patras Castle.

During the Byzantine times Patras continued to be an important port as well as an industrial center. In 551 AD it was laid in ruins by an earthquake. In 807 AD it was able without external assistance to repulse a Slavonian siege, though most of the credit of the victory was assigned to St Andrew, whose church was enriched by the imperial share of the spoils, and whose archbishop was made superior of the bishops of Methone, Lacedaemon and Corone. Besides, one of the most scholarly philosophers and theologians of the time, Arethas of Caesarea was born at Patras, at around 860. In the 9th century there is a sign that the city was prosperous: the widow Danielis from Patras had accumulated immense wealth in land ownership, carpet and textile industry and offered critical support in the ascent of Basil I to the Byzantine throne.

== Latin/Frankish era ==
Captured in 1205 by William of Champlitte and Geoffrey I of Villehardouin, the city became part of the Principality of Achaea, the seat of the Barony of Patras and of a Latin archbishop. In 1408, the city became Venetian. At the close of the 15th century the city was governed by the Latin archbishop in the name of the Pope; in 1428 the joint despots of the Morea, Constantine and Theodore, sons of Emperor Manuel II Palaiologos, managed to get possession of it for a time. It was seized again by the Despotate of the Morea in 1430, which was immediately contested by the Ottoman Empire.

== Ottoman era ==
The church of Pantocrator as a mosque during the Ottoman rule. Engraving by Edward Finden.

In 1458 Patras was conquered by Sultan Mehmed II. Under the Ottomans, it was called Baliabadra (Greek: Παλαιά Πάτρα, the old town, as opposed to Νέα Πάτρα, the fortress). Though Mehmet granted the city special privileges and tax reductions, it never became a major center of commerce. Venice and Genoa attacked and captured Patras several times during the 15th and 16th centuries, but never re-established their rule effectively.

On 7 October 1571, the Ottoman fleet on the one side, and the fleet of the Christian Holy League on the other, clashed in the Gulf of Patras in the Battle of Lepanto. The Ottomans were defeated, but the Holy League did not seize the city of Patras. The news of the Ottoman defeat were celebrated in Patras, but a revolt organized by five of the elders of the town and metropolitan Germanos I of Old Patras (1561–1572) was put down and its instigators were executed. The Venetians captured Patras from the Turks in 1687 during the Morean War and made it the seat of one of the seven fiscal boards into which they divided the Morea, but the Turks recaptured it, with the rest of the "Kingdom of the Morea", in a swift campaign in 1715. Generally, the first period of Turkish rule (1460–1687) was miserable, but from 1715 and on there was a revival of commerce, and so in the 18th century Patras became again an economically prosperous town, based on agriculture and trade.

It has been noted that during and in the aftermath of the suppressed 1770 Orlov revolt "when the Greeks got the upper hand they settled old scores; when the Turks and Albanians reasserted themselves they were merciless: recapturing Patras, they left scarcely anyone alive."

== Greek War of Independence ==
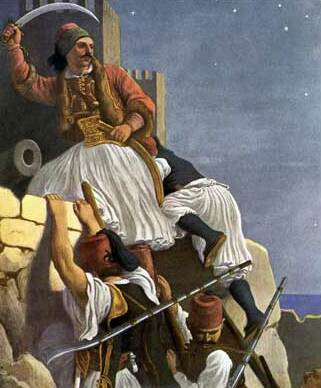
Athanasios Kanakaris during the Siege of Patras by Peter von Hess.

Patras played a crucial role in the Greek War of Independence against the Ottomans (1821–29). The town was the first seat of the revolution along with the rest of Achaea and Mani. Patras was at the time the biggest and most prosperous town of the Peloponnese. An overwhelming, 2/3 majority of the town's 18.000 inhabitants where Greeks, and a small number of them was engaged in commerce, constituting the precursors of a middle class. Moreover, due to the town's commercial importance, some wealthy merchants of Patras had been appointed consuls of the major European states. The consul of Russia Vlassopoulos was also a member of the Filiki Eteria. The atmosphere in Patras had been tense since the mid-February 1821, when the Greeks refused to pay heavy taxes for the equipment of the Ottoman Army which was fighting against Ali Pasha. In the same period, members of the Filiki Etairia were preparing the field for a revolt in Patras, accumulating munition, money and equipment for their struggle. Odysseas Androutsos was hiding in Patras and Makryiannis arrived there trying to bring in contact the protagonists of the incoming revolts and coordinate the revolutionary effort. The Turks, who grew suspicious of these movements, transferred their belongings to the fortress on February 28, and their families on March 18 and fortified themselves in it. On March 23 the Turks launched sporadic attacks towards the town, trying to set certain houses on fire, which resulted on the destruction of some districts, while the revolutionaries, led by the freedom warrior Panagiotis Karatzas and using guns drove them back to the fortress. Makryiannis referred to the scene in his memoirs:
Σε δυο ημέρες χτύπησε ντουφέκι ’στην Πάτρα. Οι Tούρκοι κάμαν κατά το κάστρο και οι Ρωμαίγοι την θάλασσα.
Shooting broke out two days later in Patras. The Turks had seized the fortress, and the Greeks had taken the seashore.

On March 25 the revolutionaries declared the Revolution in the square of Agios Georgios in Patras. Therefore, it was at Patras that the Revolution is held to have officially began on March 25, 1821 in the chapel of Agios Georgios. The Orthodox metropolitan of Patras and member of the Filiki Etairia Germanos, who was absent from Patras, returned to the town and blessed the freedom warriors. On the next day the leaders of the Revolution in Achaia sent a document to the foreign consulates explaining the reasons of the Revolution. However, some three hundred Turkish forces, mainly cavalry, under the command of Yussuf Pasha, heading from Ioannina to Euboea changed their direction and landed in Patras on April 3. The reinforcements joined the Turks of the castle, ransacked and destroyed the town. The consuls of the foreign powers who had been supportive of the revolt, namely those of Sweden, Prussia and Russia and the French consul Pouqueville who had given refuge to Greek revolutionaries, evacuated the town. The English consul Green who had kept a neutral stance refusing to accept Greeks in his consulate, and the French consul Pouqueville, in their written accounts describe the events and the extent of destruction as horrific. The irregular and unequipped revolutionary mob could not risk serious resistance. A possible exception was Panagiotis Karatzas, a local shoe-maker, who along with his men thwarted Turkish attacks on nearby settlements. Finally, the Turks, confined to the citadel, held out until being stormed by the French troops in 1828.

== Modern times ==
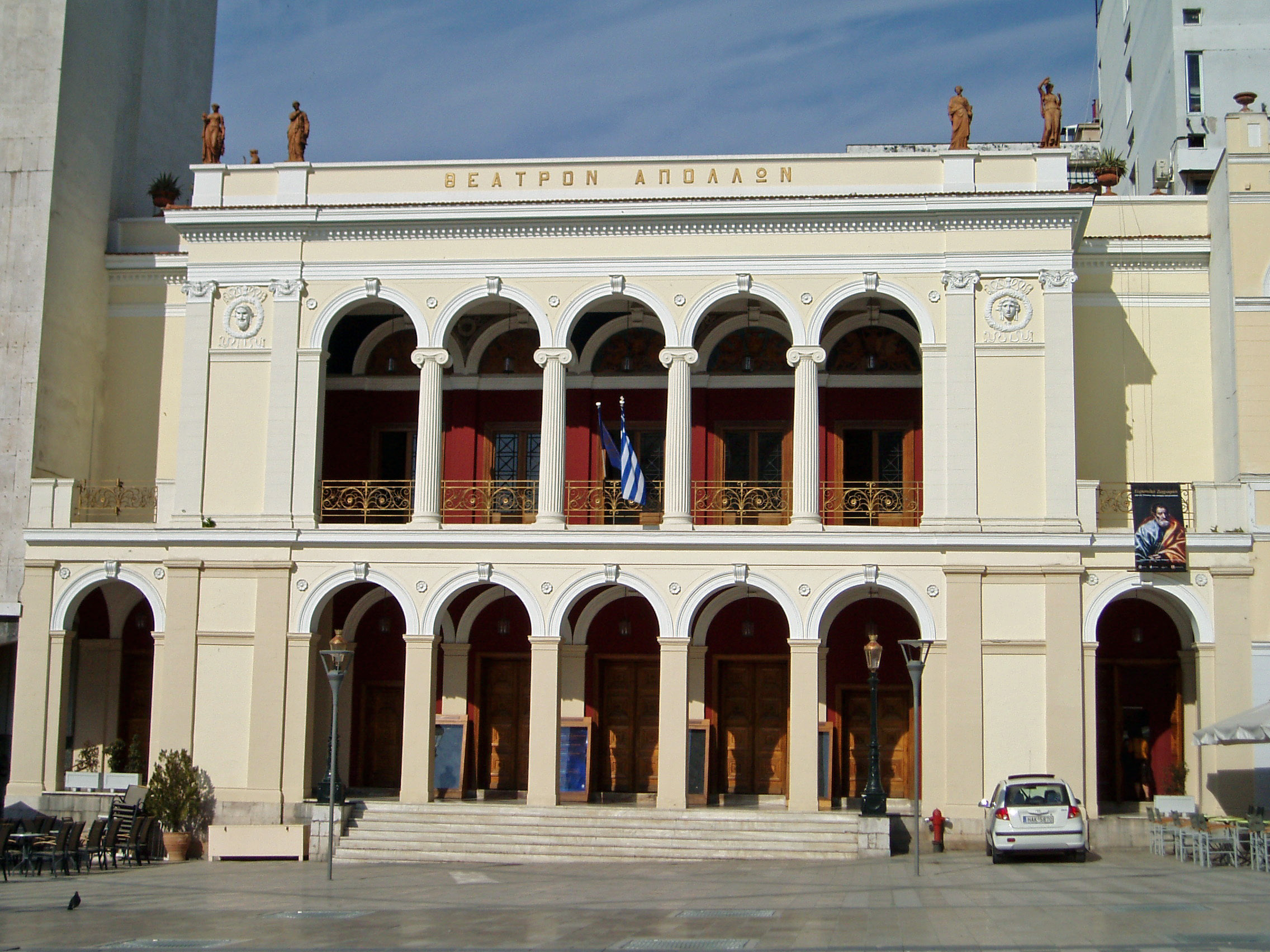
The Apollo Theatre in Georgiou I Square, a work of the architect Ernst Ziller, built with the contributions of the thriving 19th century commercial class

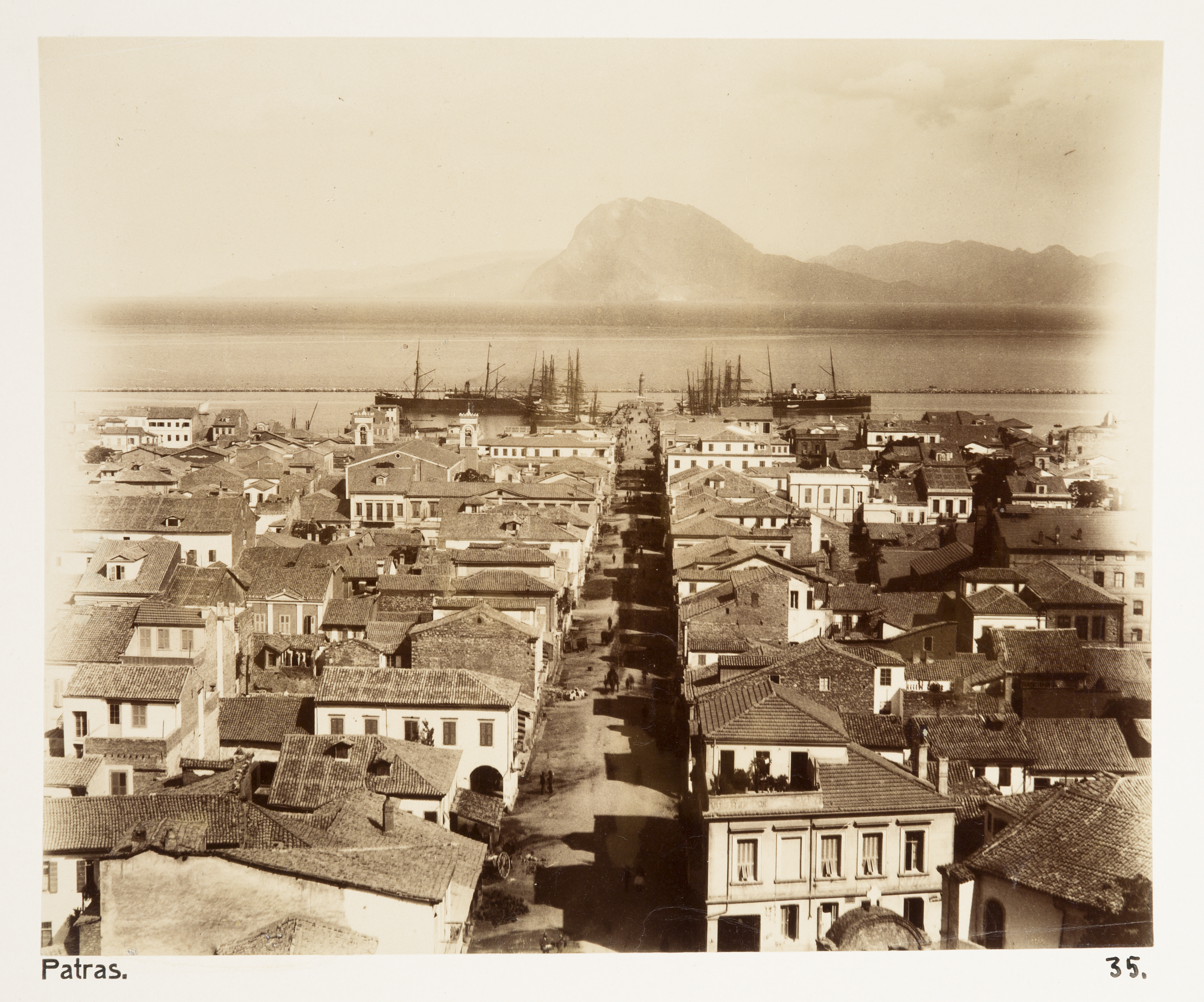
Patras in 1896

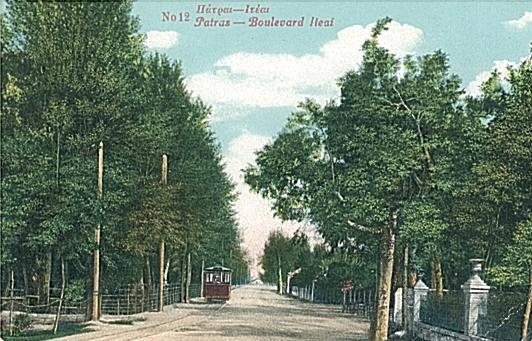
The tram in Patras, early 20th century

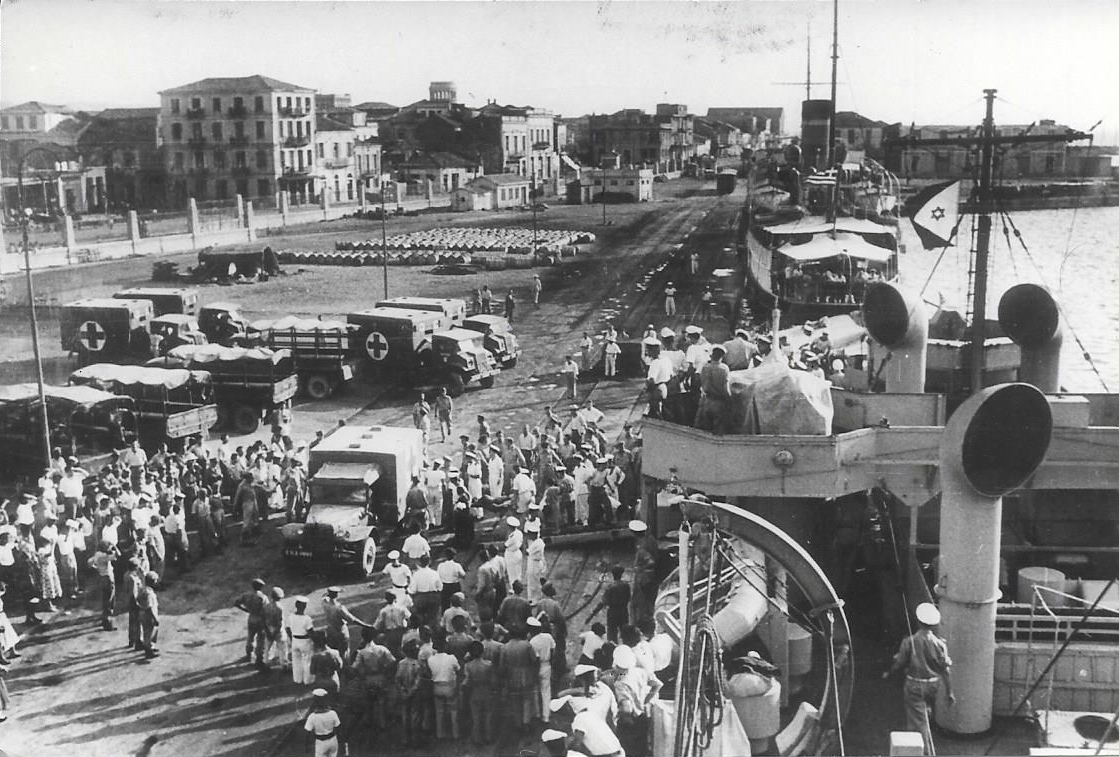
The port in 1953

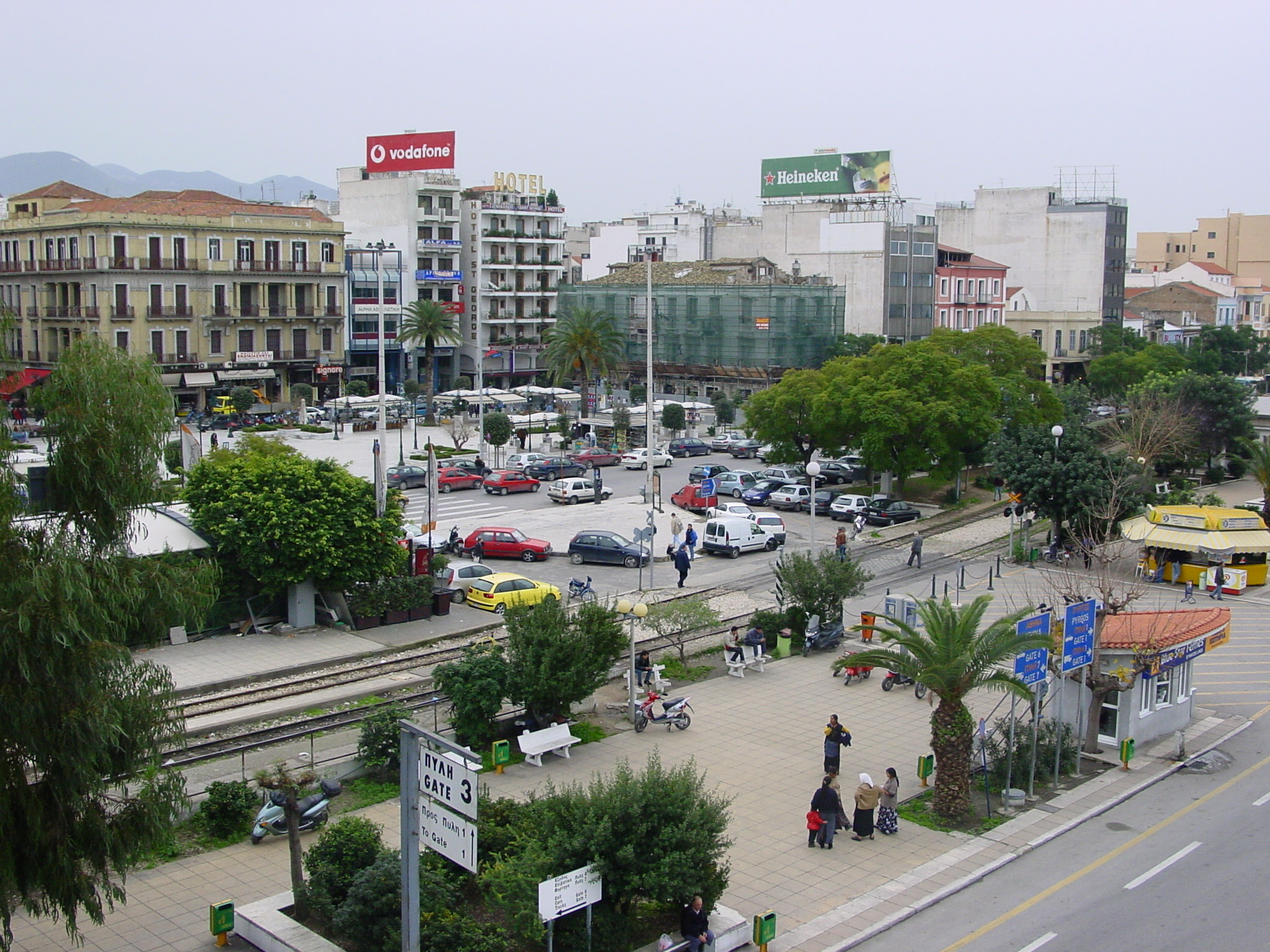
Trion Symmachon Square

Patras was liberated on 7 October 1828 by the French expeditionary force in the Peloponnese, under the command of General Maison. In 1829 the then Governor of Greece, Ioannis Kapodistrias approved a very ambitious new urban plan for the city - which was still in ruins - presented to him by the French army engineer Stamatis Voulgaris. The plan was not carried out until the mid-19th century and then only with great adaptations conforming to the interests of powerful land owners. Patras developed as the second largest urban centre in late 19th century Greece after Athens.

The city benefited from its role as the main export port for the agricultural produce of the Peloponnese. It was the main centre for the organisation of production of raisin, offering warehouse, banking and insurance services. However, this early era of prosperity was short lived; the completion of the Corinth Canal in 1893 challenged the predominance of its port. Besides, in 1894 raisin export prices in the international markets began to plummet, due to overproduction and international circumstances, which triggered a prolonged crisis with deep financial, political and social repercussions, known as the Great raisin crisis. Trade with western Europe, mainly Britain, France and Italy, did much to shape the city's early identity as a significant port and cosmopolitan urban centre in early 20th century Greece.

In the early 20th century, Patras developed fast and became the first Greek city to introduce public streetlights and electrified tramways. The war effort of World War I hampered the city's development and also created uncontrollable urban sprawl with the influx of Greek refugees from Asia Minor. During World War II, Patras was a major target of Italian air raids. At the time of the Axis occupation, a German military command was established and German and Italian troops were stationed in the city. On 13 December 1943, in the nearby town of Kalavryta, the German troops executed all the male population and set the town ablaze. After the liberation in October 1944, the city grew fast to recover, but in later years was increasingly overshadowed by the urban pole of Athens.
