= Charbonnel =

Charbonnel is a surname. Notable people with the surname include:

- Armand-François-Marie de Charbonnel OFM Cap (1802–1891), the Bishop of Toronto from 1847 to 1860
- Jean Charbonnel (1927–2014), French politician
- Jean-Michel Charbonnel (born 1952), French long-distance runner
- Marie Charbonnel (1880–1969), French contralto opera singer

== See also ==
- 269243 Charbonnel, minor planet
- Pointe de Charbonnel, mountain of Savoie, France
- École secondaire catholique Monseigneur-de-Charbonnel, French-language Catholic school in Toronto, Canada
- Charbonnel et Walker, British firm of chocolate makers
- Carbonnel (disambiguation)
