= Carbonnel =

Carbonnel may refer to:

- Delillers Carbonnel, governor of the Bank of England from 1740 to 1741.
- Villers-Carbonnel, commune in the Somme department in Hauts-de-France in northern France.
- Moulins-le-Carbonnel, commune in the Sarthe department in the region of Pays-de-la-Loire in north-western France.
