= Dimitrios Votsis =

Greek politician

Dimitrios Votsis Δημήτριος Βότσης 16th Mayor of Patras
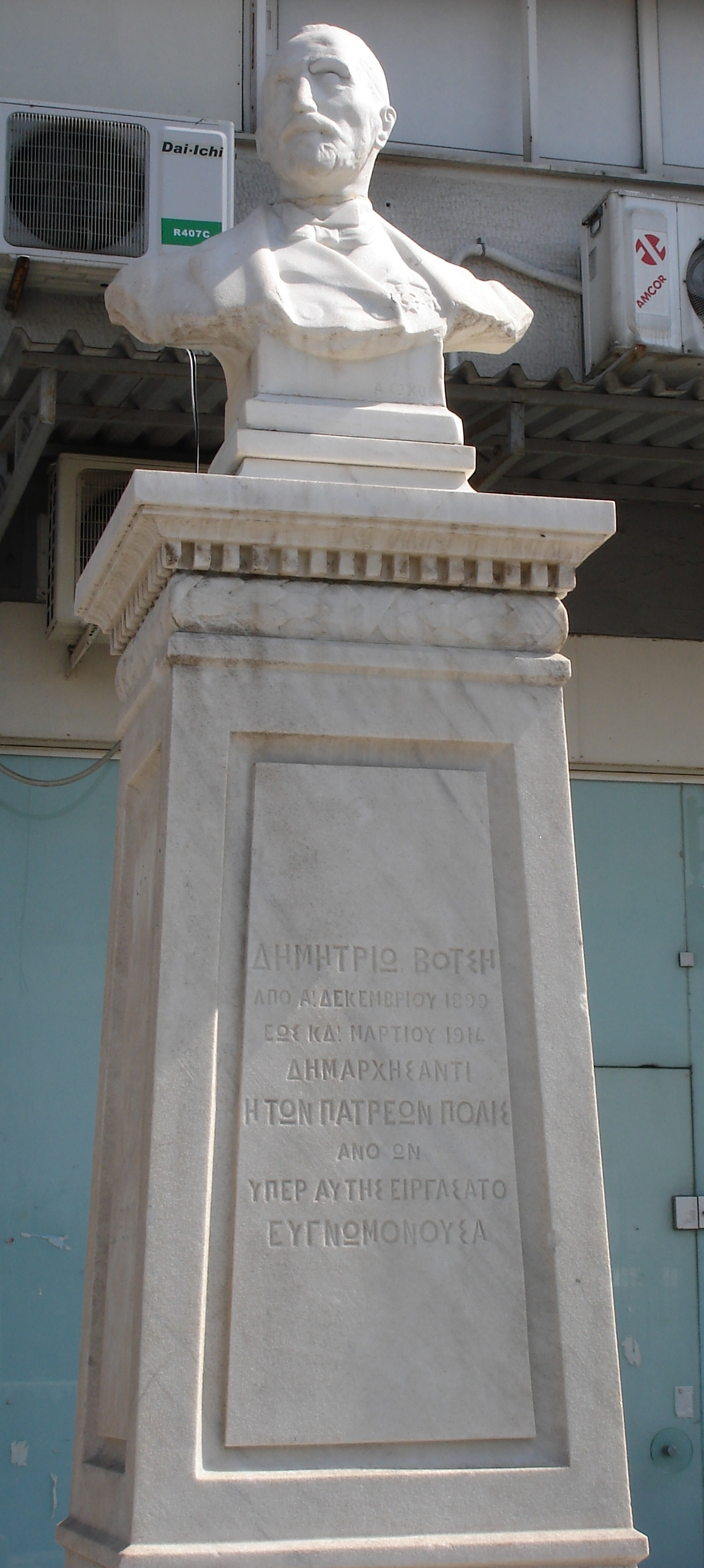
- Born: 1847; Patras, Greece
- Died: 1917 (aged 69–70); Greece
- Occupations: Politician, Mayor of Patras

Dimitrios Votsis (Greek: Δημήτριος Βότσης; 1847–1917) was a Greek politician and served as the mayor of Patras. His family hailed from Paramythia in Thesprotia, Epirus. Son of Athanasios and Eleni Votsi, who were among the first settlers of the city after their struggle for an independent Greece in Epirus was unsuccessful. Votsis pursued a legal education and later practiced law while also working as a judge in Patras.

== Career ==
Dimitrios Votsis began his political career in 1891 when he was elected to the municipal council of Patras and assumed the position of council president. Four years later, in 1895, he formed a political alliance with Achilleas Gerokostopoulos and was re-elected. He went on to serve as the mayor of Patras in 1899, and he was subsequently re-elected in the following two elections (1903 and 1907). His last term as mayor began in 1914, during the Balkan Wars. After the completion of this term, Votsis chose not to seek re-election.

== Accomplishments ==
During Dimitrios Votsis' tenure as mayor of Patras, several important projects and initiatives were undertaken. Among his most notable achievements was the initiation of the construction of the Cathedral of Saint Andrew. As a Member of Parliament, Votsis proposed the project, and in 1908, it was officially founded in the presence of King George I.

Votsis also initiated the establishment of public butcheries along Akti Dymaion and secured the purchase of the modern municipal council building for 121,000 drachmas. He actively managed the poorhouse in Akti Dymaion and played a key role in the development of new neighborhoods throughout the city. Additionally, he oversaw the construction of a new water tank in Kastro, which is still in use today, as well as a 12-kilometer-long water tower that significantly improved the city’s infrastructure.

Under Votsis' leadership, Patras saw the implementation of several major infrastructure projects. He acquired military barracks in the Synora district, structures that still stand today, maintained and enhanced the city’s tree-lined squares, and oversaw the paving of previously unpaved roads, including those leading to Olga Square. Notably, he introduced electricity to the city in 1902 and established a gaslight factory in Krya Ition, installing the city's first streetlamps in Georgiou I Square and Maizonos Street. Votsis also introduced trams to Patras, connecting them to the railroad, although the tram system was discontinued after World War II.

Votsis was widely recognized for his commitment to social welfare, implementing a policy that ensured access to water for the poor at a reduced price. During his tenure, the government attempted to impose restrictions on entry into the city of Patras, but Votsis strongly opposed this move. He continued to advocate for the city's interests, maintaining his commitment even after World War I.

== Legacy ==
Dimitrios Votsis died on 28 October 1917, leaving behind a legacy of significant contributions to the development of Patras. In honor of his service, a street in the city, Votsi Street, was named after him. The street stretches from Karaiskakis Street to the west, leading to Othonos-Amalias Avenue. As a further tribute, a statue of Votsis was erected in 2000 at the end of the street near Othonos-Amalias Avenue. The statue stands as a reminder of his remarkable achievements and enduring impact on the city of Patras.

Preceded by Athanasios Kanakaris-Roufos	Mayor of Patras; September 6, 1899 - February 9, 1914	Succeeded by Dimitrios Andrikopoulos-Boukaouris
