= Aristomenis Kontogouris =

Greek politician

Aristomenis Kontogouris Αριστομένης Κοντογούρης
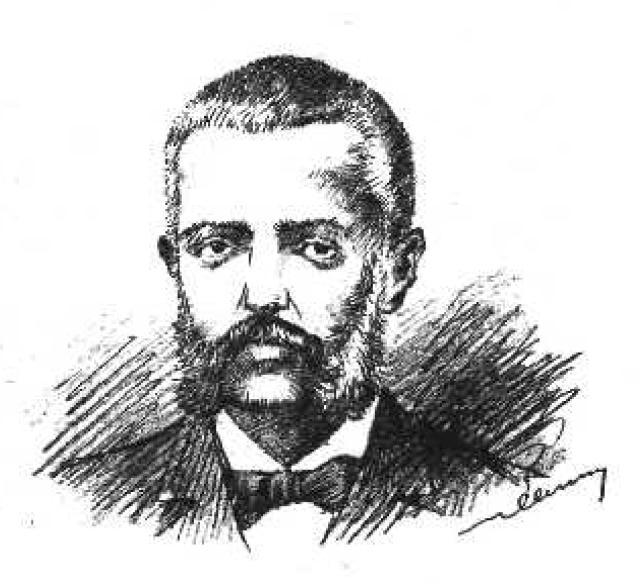
- Born: c. 1841; Patras, Greece
- Died: 1903; Greece
- Occupations: politician, 15th mayor of Patras

Aristomenis Kontogouris (Greek: Αριστομένης Κοντογούρης; c. 1841–1904) was a Greek MP for Achaia and a mayor of Patras.

Kontogouris was born in Patras and was the son of Stylianos Kontogouris, relative of the famous rich family in Patras. He studied law in Athens, Berlin, and in Paris. He was elected MP in 1873, 1879, 1881, and 1885 and he was also a Minister of Justice. He became mayor of Patras from 1891 until 1895. He was a mayoral candidate but lost the 1888 election, he was supported by Achilleas Gerokostopoulos in the 1890 elections and he defeated the industrialist Gerasimos Kogkos. In his years in the military, he ran the city's philharmonic company. He had a wife, Viktoria Sisini, daughter of Chrysanthos Sisinis. Kontogouris died in 1904.

Preceded by Georgios Roufos	Mayor of Patras; July 8, 1891 - September 11, 1895	Succeeded by Athanasios Kanakaris-Roufos
