= Rouphos =

Rouphos or Roufos or Rufus (Greek: Ρούφος) is an ancient Greek name and modern Greek surname. It may refer to the following persons:

- Rufus of Ephesus, an ancient Greek physician
- Rufus of Thebes, was a bishop of Thebes
- Athanasios Kanakaris-Roufos (1830–1902), mayor of Patras
- Benizelos Roufos (1795–1868), prime minister of Greece
- Angelos Roufos (1852–?), Greek politician
- Georgios Roufos (1841–1891), mayor of Patras
- Ioannis Roufos (1870–1908), Greek politician
- Loukas Kanakaris-Roufos (1878–1949), Greek politician
- Vasileios Roufos (1880–1960), mayor of Patras

== See also ==
- Rufus
