= Kanakaris =

Kanakaris (Greek: Κανακάρης) may refer to the following persons:

- Athanasios Kanakaris (1760–1823), a Greek revolutionary and politician
- Athanasios Kanakaris-Roufos (1830–1902), a Greek politician
- Loukas Kanakaris-Roufos (1878–1949), a Greek politician
- Rodis Kanakaris-Roufos (1924–1972), a Greek diplomat and writer
