= Angelos Roufos =

Greek politician

Angelos Roufos (Greek: Άγγελος Ρούφος, born c. 1852) was a Greek politician from Achaea.

He was born in about 1852 in Patras to Benizelos Roufos, the scion of a well-established local political family. He was elected three times to the Greek Parliament. In 1899, he stood for election as mayor of Patras but lost because the family vote was divided between him and his brother Athanasios Kanakaris-Roufos.
