= Georgios Roufos =

Greek politician

Georgios Roufos Γεώργιος Ρούφος 11th mayor of Patras
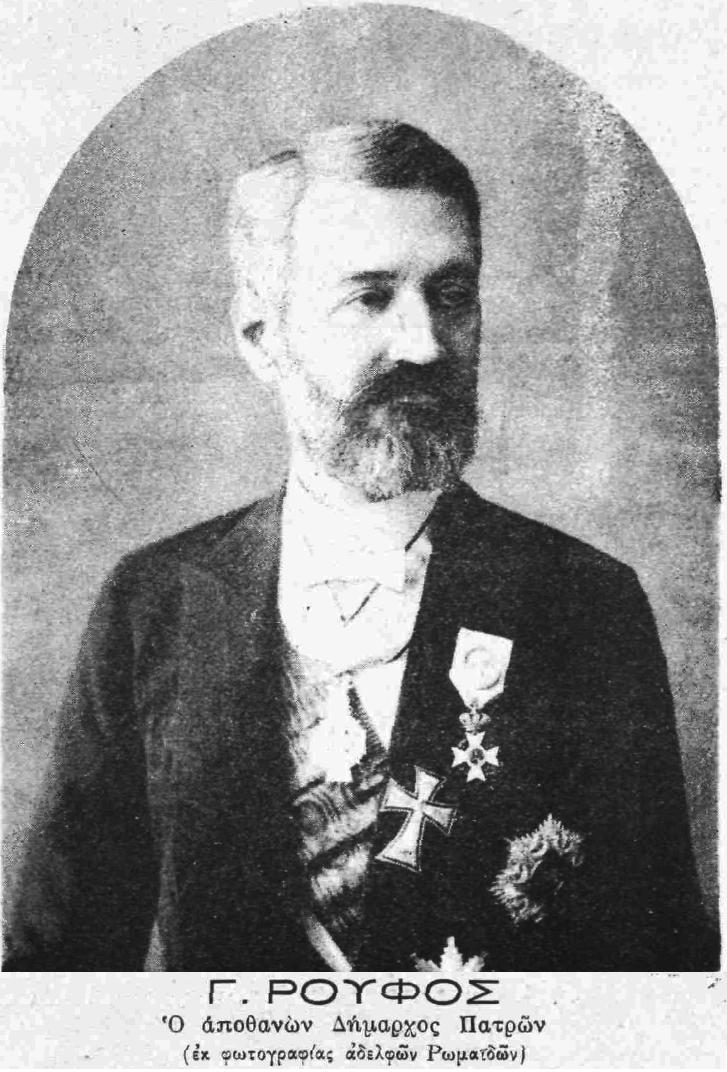
- Born: 1841; Patras, Greece
- Died: 1891; Patras, Greece
- Occupation: politician

Georgios Roufos (Greek: Γεώργιος Ρούφος, 1841–1891) was a Greek politician and Mayor of Patras for three terms, 1870–1874, 1874–1875 and 1887–1891. He was the 11th mayor of Patras.

He was the son of Benizelos Roufos, a Prime Minister of Greece and Mayor of Patras, he is descended from the Rouphos-Kanakaris families with many generations of politicians and descended from southern Italy.

He studied law in Athens and northwest to Paris. He married Roxani Mavromichali (Ρωξάνη Μαυρομιχάλη) and raised a son Ioannis Roufos. In 1864, he was attorney at the national assembly. During his mayoral run, he constructed and opened the Apollo Theatre, opened a public hospital, began the construction of wave braker at the Port of Patras, localized the opening of Georgiou I Square and ran the gaslight factory 1 km south-southwest of downtown. It cost 1,000,000 drachmas of that time and loan payments. In his second term in 1977, it had a lot of rascals and troublemakers between the Rouphic and the Antirouphics. In that situation, he tore down the castle at the spot where the theater was constructed, bakery and several buildings. He was elected repeatedly in 1883 to the Trikoupi government, he was a naval minister.

In 1891, a large fire destroyed his homes and the archives of the Rouphos family. He gave 800 volumes from the library in Patras before his death and gave the municipality his home in which today is part of the Roufeio (or Roufio) Public School. He was later honoured and a street in Patras was named after him. He had a second house in now suburban Roitika.

Preceded by Periklis Kalamogdartis	Mayor of Patras (1870-April 5, 1875)	Succeeded by P. Roupakiotis

Preceded by Dimitrios Patrinos	Mayor of Patras (October 4, 1887-July 7, 1891)	Succeeded by Aristomenis Kontogouris
