= Stamatis Voulgaris =

Greek painter and urban planner

- Born: 1774; Lefkimmi (Corfu, Venetian Ionian Islands)
- Died: 1842 (aged 67–68); Lefkimmi (Corfu, United States of the Ionian Islands)
- Education: Collège des Quatre-Nations; Atelier of Jacques-Louis David
- Occupations: Military officer Urbanist; Architect; Painter
- Known for: Morea expedition (1828); First urban plan of the city of Patras, Greece (1829)
- Title: Lieutenant colonel of the French Army
- Honours: Knight of the Legion of Honour; Knight of the Order of Saint Louis

Stamatis Voulgaris or Stamati Bulgari (Greek: Σταμάτης Βούλγαρης), was a Greek painter, architect and the first urban planner of modern Greece. He was born in Lefkimmi in the island of Corfu, Venetian Ionian Islands in 1774, and died in 1842. He was also an officer in the French army and had been also granted French nationality.

== Life ==
=== Youth ===
Stamatis Voulgaris was born in Lefkimmi, on the island of Corfu in the Ionian Islands (then a Venetian possession), in 1774. His parents were Alexandros Voulgaris of Aloysios and Loukia Pandis. From the age of seven, he attended school at St. Justine's monastery in Garitsa, where he learned his first letters. There, he was a classmate of Ioannis Kapodistrias, the future governor of Greece. An interesting incident led him to his decision to become an urban planner. During the Russian-Turkish siege of 1798–1799, while in the vicinity of the San Giacomo theater in Corfu, a cannon ball fired from a Russian vessel fell beside young Voulgaris without immediately exploding. He immediately grabbed the fuse and then neutralized it, thus saving the theater and a whole French military detachment which passed nearby with heavy weapons and ammunition. French General Louis François Jean Chabot, a friend of Napoleon, to honor his bravery, enlisted him in the French army. When the French left, the young man followed them to Paris, where he studied urban planning in a military academy.

In 1808, he was appointed lieutenant of the Engineers. At the same time, he studied at the Collège des Quatre-Nations (which now houses the headquarters of the Institut de France). He became an engineer geographer and an extraordinary designer in the service of the ministry's Dépôt de la Guerre (a depository of maps and archives). He participated in several military missions, notably between 1810 and 1814, as an employee at the General Staff of the governor of the Ionian Islands (now again under French rule), General François-Xavier Donzelot. After the French surrendered the Islands in 1814, he was arrested by the English and imprisoned in Malta. When he was released, he undertook a new special mission in Epirus and Albania, then was recalled to France to fight at the Battle of Waterloo on 18 June 1815. After Napoleon's defeat, he was removed from the army by the Bourbon Restoration, then was reinstated and raised to the rank of captain of the General Staff. On 30 January 1817, he was officially naturalized as a French citizen by order of King Louis XVIII.

=== Barbizon School ===
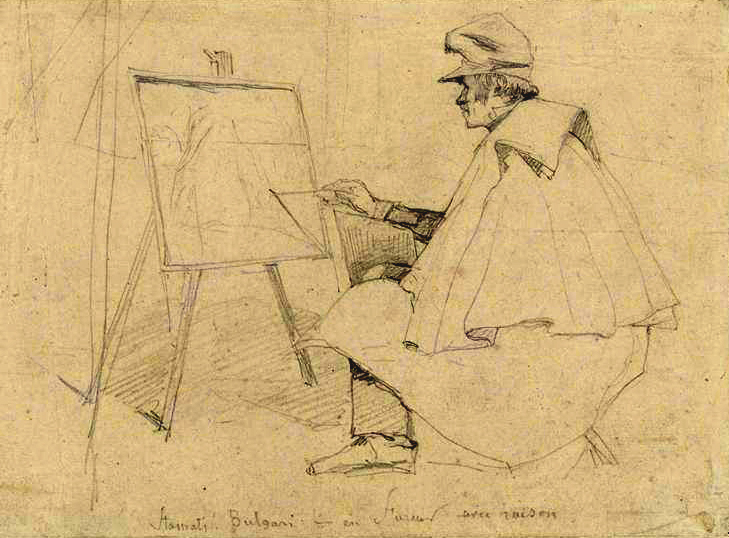
Portrait of Stamati Bulgari, seated in front of his easel (by Camille Corot who wrotes down: "Stamati Bulgari in rage with reason")

Voulgaris followed several painting courses in parallel with his studies, in particular in the atelier of the renown painter Jacques-Louis David. He then became part, with his fellow student, the famous painter Jean-Baptiste Camille Corot, of the first members of a whole new generation of young neo-classical painters from the 1820s, in David's suite, later called the School of Barbizon. This colony of landscape artists (called the "open airists"), grouping painters such as Charles-François Daubigny, Théodore Rousseau, Jean-François Millet or Gustave Courbet, were coming together a few kilometers from Paris to work in the forest of Fontainebleau which was for them a source of inspiration.

Voulgaris and Corot thus lived together in the village of Chailly-en-Bière from July 1821. Corot drew several portraits of Voulgaris, "in his bed" or "sitting in front of his easel" (he wrote at the bottom of the latter with a graphite stylus: "Stamati Bulgari in rage with reason"). Voulgaris also painted in 1821, in his Souvenirs (published in 1835), a literary painting of this forest of Fontainebleau which used to inspire him with a "meditative and religious feeling". This description is considered to be the very first known of this colony of artists.

=== Spain expedition and travel to the Antilles ===
In 1823 he fought in the 3rd Corps of the Pyrenees Army during the Spanish military expedition led by France against the Spanish liberals to restore King Ferdinand VII to his throne. On the occasion of this campaign, he wrote two chapters in his Souvenirs from the Alhambra Palace in Granada. In December 1825, he requested to be attached to the staff of Lieutenant-General Henri Baudrand to accompany him for an inspection of the engineering service in French Guiana, in Barbados and in Martinique, where he met again General Donzelot (the former governor of the Ionian Islands), now governor of the island. Voulgaris twice suffered from tropical fever. He returned to France in August 1826 and devoted a chapter of his Souvenirs to this journey.

=== Morea expedition and urban planning in Greece ===
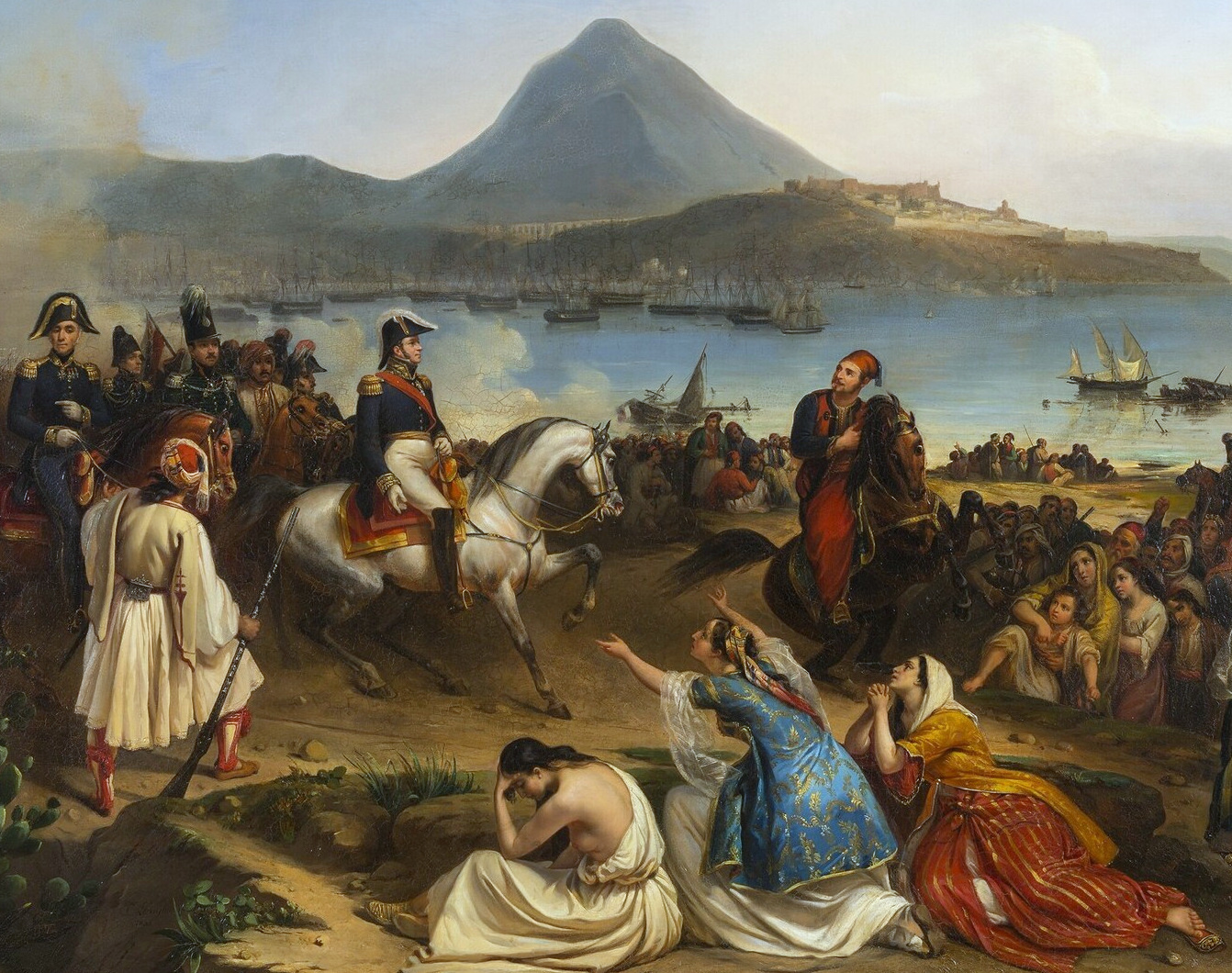
General Maison, commander of the French expedition of the Morea, meeting Ibrahim Pasha of Egypt at Navarino in 1828 (by Jean-Charles Langlois)

Since 1821, the Greek War of Independence was raging in Greece, which had not left Voulgaris indifferent: in 1825 he wrote in his Souvenirs: "Grecs, aux armes! aux armes!", after learning of Lord Byron's death at Missolonghi. In October 1827, Ioannis Kapodistrias, recently elected as the first governor of independent Greece, went to Paris to ask the French government for advisers and French army officers to organise the army of the new Greek state. On the recommendation of the French Ministry of War, Voulgaris and three other officers (the captains of artillery Jean-Henri-Pierre-Augustin Pauzié, of the topographic service Pierre Peytier, and of the engineers Auguste-Théodore Garnot) were sent to Greece in 1828 to train young Greek military engineers. They were all four attached to the general staff of General Maison, commander-in-chief of the Morea military expedition, whose mission was to liberate the Peloponnese from the Turkish-Egyptian occupation troops of Ibrahim Pasha. The artillery captain Pauzié founded the Artillery School (Σχoλή Πυρoβoλικoύ) and then the Central Military Academy of the Evelpides (Κεντρική Στρατιωτική Σχολή Ευελπίδων) in 1828 on the model of the French École Polytechnique. Captain Peytier drew the first modern map of the Peloponnese.

Kapodistrias appreciated the expertise of Voulgaris. The two men met first in Italy in Ancona, and then embarked together aboard the frigate HMS Warspite for Nafplio in Greece, where they arrived on 7 January 1828. Kapodistrias asked Voulgaris to conduct a study on the search for a suitable location in the city to build a colony for war refugees. Allocation of other urban plans followed, such as the urban planning of the cities of Nafplio (historic center and suburb of Prónoia), Tripoli, Pylos and Argos, in collaboration with Captain Garnot.

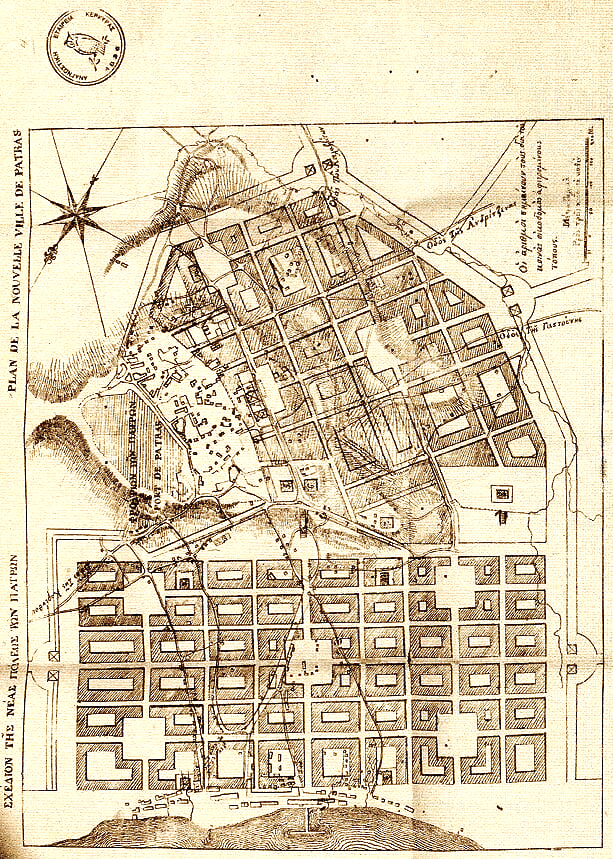
The original first urban plan of Patras, drawn up in 1829 by Stamatis Voulgaris and Auguste-Théodore Garnot, captains of the Morea expedition

Yet, the most important urban planning mission of Voulgaris was the planning of the city of Patras in 1829, on Kapodistrias' order. He arrived there on 5 December 1828 accompanied by Captain Auguste-Théodore Garnot. The Turkish-Egyptian troops of Ibrahim Pasha had left only ruins in Patras. They had destroyed the houses, burned the gardens, uprooted all the trees and demolished the ramparts of the city fortress. Voulgaris specifically proposed to erect the modern city on the seaside, which was then a freer and more extensive area. The city, with a geometric composition, took the form of a large parallelogram bordering the coastal area and of a second ending at the periphery of the old town. Seventeen vertical and wide uphill streets intersected, at right angles, eight other horizontal streets, thus dividing the city into a hundred large blocks of buildings. He also planned to build nine symmetrical public squares, quays, vast and long boulevards or avenues bordered by trees and perfectly ventilated, fountains, arcades, green areas round the Patras Castle and three main doors which would open on the roads to Gastouni, Kalavryta and Corinth. Voulgaris also wanted to cover out of his own pocket the financial costs for tree planting in Patras.

However, the original plan was not fully implemented, because on the one hand the kodjabashis (notables and primates) and the local property owners put Governor Kapodistrias under pressure to prevent any change, and on the other hand state finances were not sufficient to achieve Voulgaris' visionary plan: in 1830, the 5 symmetrical squares he had designed in the parallelogram bordering the coastal area were reduced to 2 only, including the central square dedicated to democracy (currently Vasileos Georgiou I Square) and concord (currently Vasilissis Olgas Square).

After handing over the city's plans to Governor Kapodistrias, Voulgaris joined the troops of the regular Greek army, then commanded by the governor's brother, Augustinos Kapodistrias, commander-in-chief for Continental Greece. Captain Voulgaris was responsible in particular for drawing the plan of the siege of Lepanto (Nafpaktos) and the direction of its works. In April 1829 the siege ended and the city was taken over from the Turks. Voulgaris indicated in his Souvenirs that "this important conquest brought that of Missolonghi (in May), where ended, with this Greek expedition, my military career."

=== Last years in Corfu ===
In August 1830, Voulgaris, sick, returned to France and was raised in 1831 to the rank of chef de bataillon. In 1838, he retired to his native Corfu, in the village of Potamos near Lefkimmi, where he died in 1842. In his will, he left money to various friends and relatives, and, moreover, to the French Consulate to distribute to the French indigents of Corfu.

== Decorations ==
- Knight of the Legion of Honour.
- Knight of the Order of Saint-Louis.

== Publications ==
- Stamatis Voulgaris, Examen moral des principaux tableaux de la galerie du Luxembourg en 1818, et considérations sur l'état actuel de la peinture en France, par M. Stamati Bulgari, (Gallica – BnF), Paris, 1827.
- Stamatis Voulgaris, Notice sur le comte Jean Capodistrias, Président de la Grèce, suivie d'un extrait de sa correspondance; par Stamati Bulgari, Chef de bataillon au Corps Royal d’État-major, Delaunay, Paris, 1832.
- Stamatis Voulgaris, Souvenirs de Stamati Bulgari, Chef de bataillon au Corps Royal d'État-major, en retraite, (Gallica – BnF), A. Pihan de La Forest, Paris, 1835.
