= Dikos Vyzantios =

Greek painter

Konstantinos "Dikos" Vyzantios (Greek: Κωνσταντίνος Βυζάντιος; 1924 in Athens – 10 August 2007 in Majorca, Spain), also known as Constantin Byzantios, was a prominent Greek painter and a representative of the School of Paris.

== Family background ==
Born in Athens, Dikos Vyzantios was the son of Periklis Vyzantios, a well-known painter of his time, and Evfropsini Skoumbourdi. His given name was Konstantinos. On his father's side, he descended from an old Phanariot family, while his mother's lineage traced back to the Kountouriotis family. Specifically, he was the great-grandson of Dimitrios Patrinos, mayor of Patras and a member of parliament, the great-great-grandson of Dimitrios Voulgaris, a Prime Minister of Greece, and the great-great-great-grandson of Lazaros Kountouriotis, a senator and shipowner.

== Career ==
Vyzantios received his initial painting lessons from his father, Perikles Vyzantios. At a young age, he was admitted to the Athens School of Fine Arts and in 1945, he was sent to Paris on a scholarship from the French Institute to continue his studies. There, he mingled and collaborated with notable figures in the artistic and intellectual world. He worked with painter Demetrios Galanis, artist Aron, and the renowned sculptor Alberto Giacometti, with whom he developed a close friendship.

His artistic talent was recognized early in France, receiving positive reviews. His works were sold to museums worldwide, including the Luxembourg Museum, the Dallas Contemporary, the National Gallery "Alexandros Soutsos" in Greece, and the Benaki Museum. His work is divided into three periods: Abstraction (1945 - 1972), which concluded with a retrospective exhibition at the Palais Galliera introduced by Eugène Ionesco; Sketches (1972 - 1981), commented on by Michel Foucault; and Forms (1981 - 2007), featuring anthropocentric compositions and still lifes. His early career was marked by abstract painting, while his later work returned to representational art in black and white drawings. The third phase was characterized by neo-representational tendencies focusing on still life.

Throughout his life, Vyzantios received numerous accolades. In 1989, he was honored by the French Republic (under the ministry of Jack Lang) as a Knight of Ordre des Arts et des Lettres. In 1990, the French government awarded him Officier des Arts et des Lettres. In 1997, a major retrospective exhibition was organized by the French government at the Espace des Arts, Chalon-sur-Saône. His works are also displayed at the Lazaros Kountouriotis Mansion, donated by his sister, Marilena Liakopoulou. A documentary titled Dikos Vyzantios – In the Footsteps of the Lost Gaze, directed by Pandora Mouriki, is dedicated to his life. Since 1946, he had been a permanent resident of Paris. He died in Mallorca, Spain, on 7 August 2007 and was married to the poet Marie-Laure David.
