= Apollon Theatre (Patras) =

- Θέατρο Απόλλων
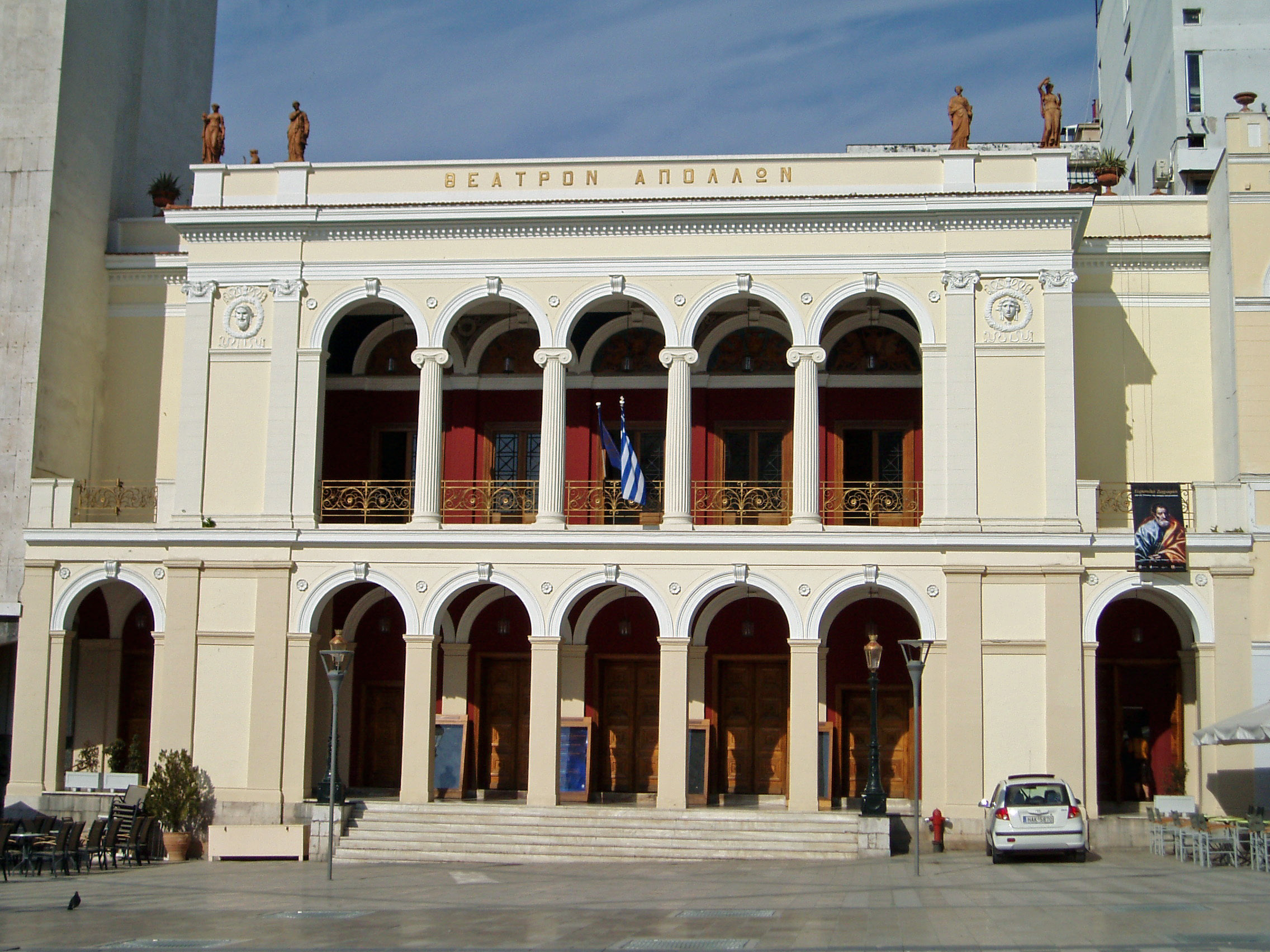
- Apollon Theatre

- Location within Patras

General information
- Type: Opera house
- Architectural style: Neoclassical
- Location: Patras, Othonos-Amalias Avenue 6 Patras, Greece
- Coordinates: 38.2466°N 21.7356°E
- Construction started: February 11, 1871; 155 years ago
- Completed: 10 October 1872
- Inaugurated: 10 October 1872
- Client: Municipality of Patras
- Owner: City of Patras

Technical details
- Floor count: 2

Design and construction
- Architect: Ernst Ziller

Other information
- Seating capacity: 108

Website
- http://www.dipethepatras.gr

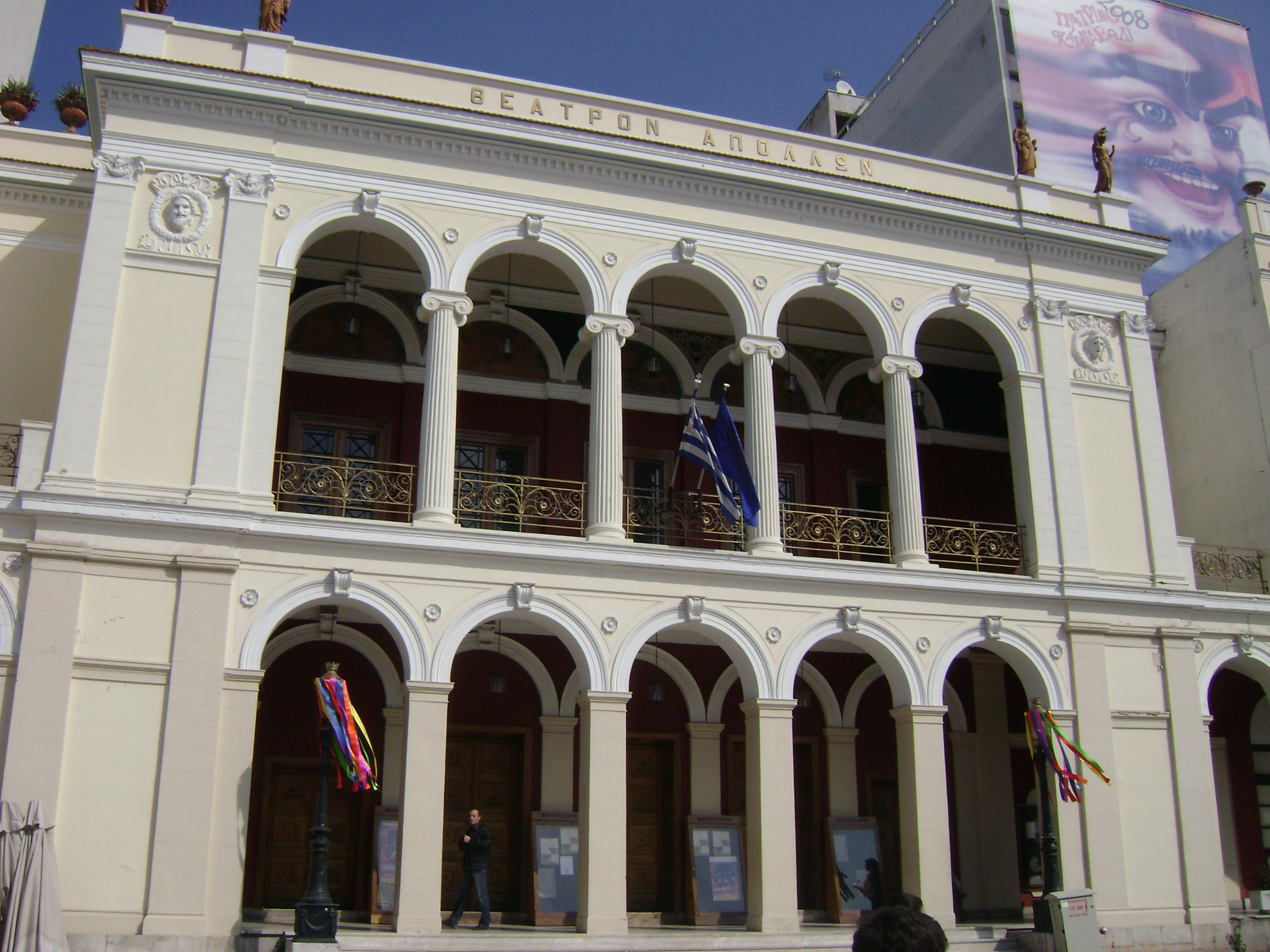
Apollon Theatre

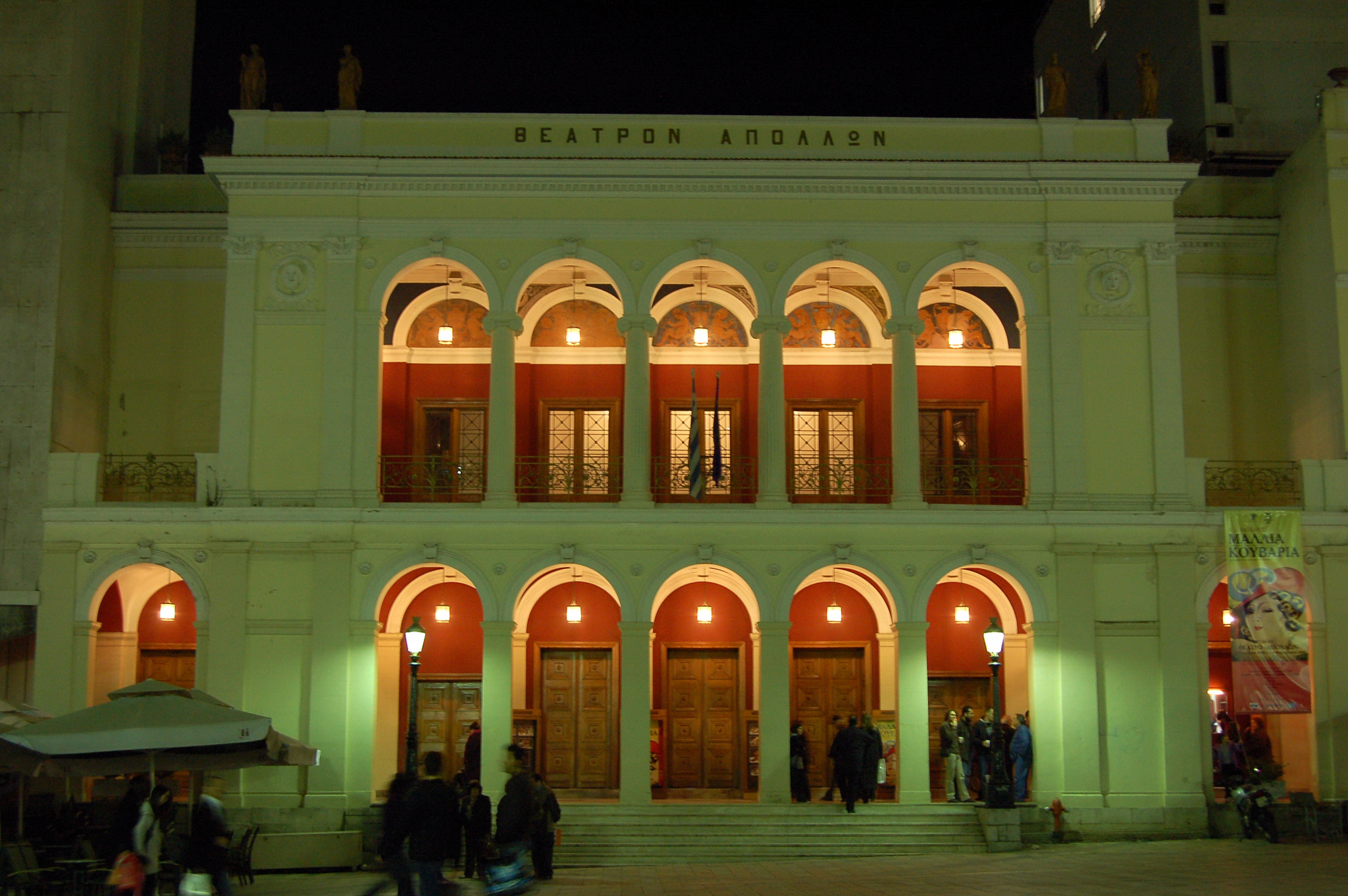
View by night

The Apollon Theatre (Greek: Θέατρο "Απόλλων", Theatro Apollon) is a theatre in Patras, Greece. Designed by the famous German architect Ernst Ziller, it was completed in 1872. The Apollon is located east of Georgiou I Square, one of Patras' popular squares. The theatre is a micrograph of the La Scala in Milan and is the oldest existing enclosed theatre of the same era. The Apollon Theatre has been the main stage of the Patras Municipal and Regional Theatre since 1988, and can hold up to 300 people.

== History ==
The Apollon Theatre began construction on February 11, 1871, and opened on October 10, 1872. The construction was paid for by various residents of Patras. The main erection committee included Theodor Hamburger (president), Dimitrios Patrinos, K. Lappas and A. Chrysanthis.

Other sponsors included the then-mayor of Patras, Georgios Roufos, Gustavos Clauss, Hamburger, Langouras, the Triantis Brothers, Panagiotis Brothers, father of Dimitrios Gounaris, Epameinondas Maximos, father of Dimitrios Maximos

The Apollon Theatre is one of only four neoclassic theatres that survive in Greece (the other three are the Malliaropouleio Theatre in Tripoli, which opened in 1910, the Apollo Theatre in Syros, opened in 1864 and the Piraeus Municipal Theatre in Piraeus, opened in 1895).

== See also ==
- Patras
- Georgiou I Square
- Saint Andrew of Patras
- Archaeological Museum of Patras

== Bibliography ==
- Lefkoma "Patra: apo tin archaiotita eos simera (Λεύκωμα "ΠΑΤΡΑ: από την αρχαιότητα έως σήμερα = Lefkoma: Patra: From Antiquity To Today) - Kotinos S.A. Publishers (from the source of the 2006 Cultural Capital of Europe)
