= Patras Municipal and Regional Theatre =

The Patras Municipal and Regional Theatre is located in Patras, Greece was founded in June 1988 as Patras Municipal Theatre and is the largest theatre organisation in southwest Greece. Its main stage is the landmark Apollon Theatre.

== History ==
Logo of Patras Municipal and Regional Theatre

The first play was "Madame de Sade" by Yukio Mishima, directed by Maya Liberopoulou. On June 29, 1989 the theatre took its present name Patras Municipal and Regional Theatre (DIPETHE) and its first artistic directors were Maya Liberopoulou and Viktor Arditis. The first, but also critically acclaimed play of the DIPETHE was Tennessee Williams's Glass Menagerie, followed by Maxim Gorky's "Petit-Bourgeois", and Carlo Goldoni's trilogy of Holidays. Subsequent artistic directors were Nikos Armaos, Giorgos Kimoulis, Themis Moumoulidis (1999–2007). Its current artistic director is the actress and director Lydia Koniordou. The theatre is regularly subsidized by the Municipality of Patras and the Ministry of Culture. A local demand which is yet to be materialised has been the transformation of the theatre into a National Theatre of Southern Greece. Nonetheless the theatre faces long-term economic problems, in part due to the non granting of agreed subsidies from the Ministry of Culture, while its second stage the "Epikentro" was demolished in view of the Patras 2006 Cultural Capital of Europe, without being replaced by a new theatre.
