= Dimitrios Andrikopoulos-Boukaouris =

Greek politician

Dimitrios Andrikopoulos-Boukaouris Δημήτριος Ανδρικόπουλος-Μπουκαούρης
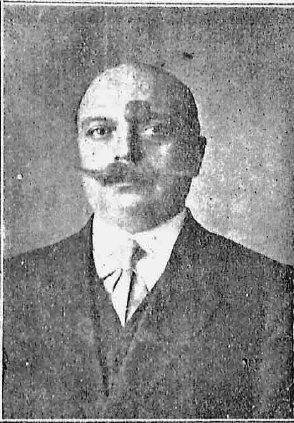
- Dimitrios Andrikopoulos-Boukaouris in 1918
- Born: 1867; Patras, Greece
- Died: 1948 (aged 80–81); Patras, Greece
- Occupations: politician, mayor of Patras
- Known for: 16th Mayor of Patras; 1883–1887

Dimitrios Andrikopoulos-Boukaouris (Greek: Δημήτριος Ανδρικόπουλος-Μπουκαούρης; 1867–1948) was a Greek politician in Achaea and a mayor of Patras.

He was born in Patras. His mother came from a historic political family and so he kept her name 'Boukaouris' in his own surname. He studied law and taught with politicals as a judge.

He was first elected as mayor in 1914 in the first elections that happened with the voting system, he remained mayor until 1925, he did not run from August 1 until . He brought electricity to the city and knew the municipal uses while World War I eased the factory work and closed the municipal electric and manufacturing factories. In the continuation of electricity, it brought the same industrialists from their rights to electric power that they had in their factory. It brought the exploitation of the Glafkos River in 1922 and finished in 1925 with many obstacles and many political changes. The main proposal happened and was accepted by Eleftherios Venizelos, later by Dimitrios Gounaris and finally by Andreas Michalakopoulos, which concluded new funding and the agreement that started the construction of the project and the maintenance of electric power. In the tenders, a Greek and twelve foreign companies bid. The hiring was made by the raising of the Insanity Refuge.

He died in Patras in 1948.

Preceded by Dimitrios Votsis	Mayor of Patras; February 10, 1914 - August 1, 1920	Succeeded by Georgios Triantis
Preceded by Georgios Topalis	Mayor of Patras; November 6, 1920 - December 1, 1925	Succeeded by Ioannis Vlachos
