= Loukas Kanakaris-Roufos =

Greek politician

Loukas Kanakaris-Roufos Λουκάς Κανακάρης-Ρούφος
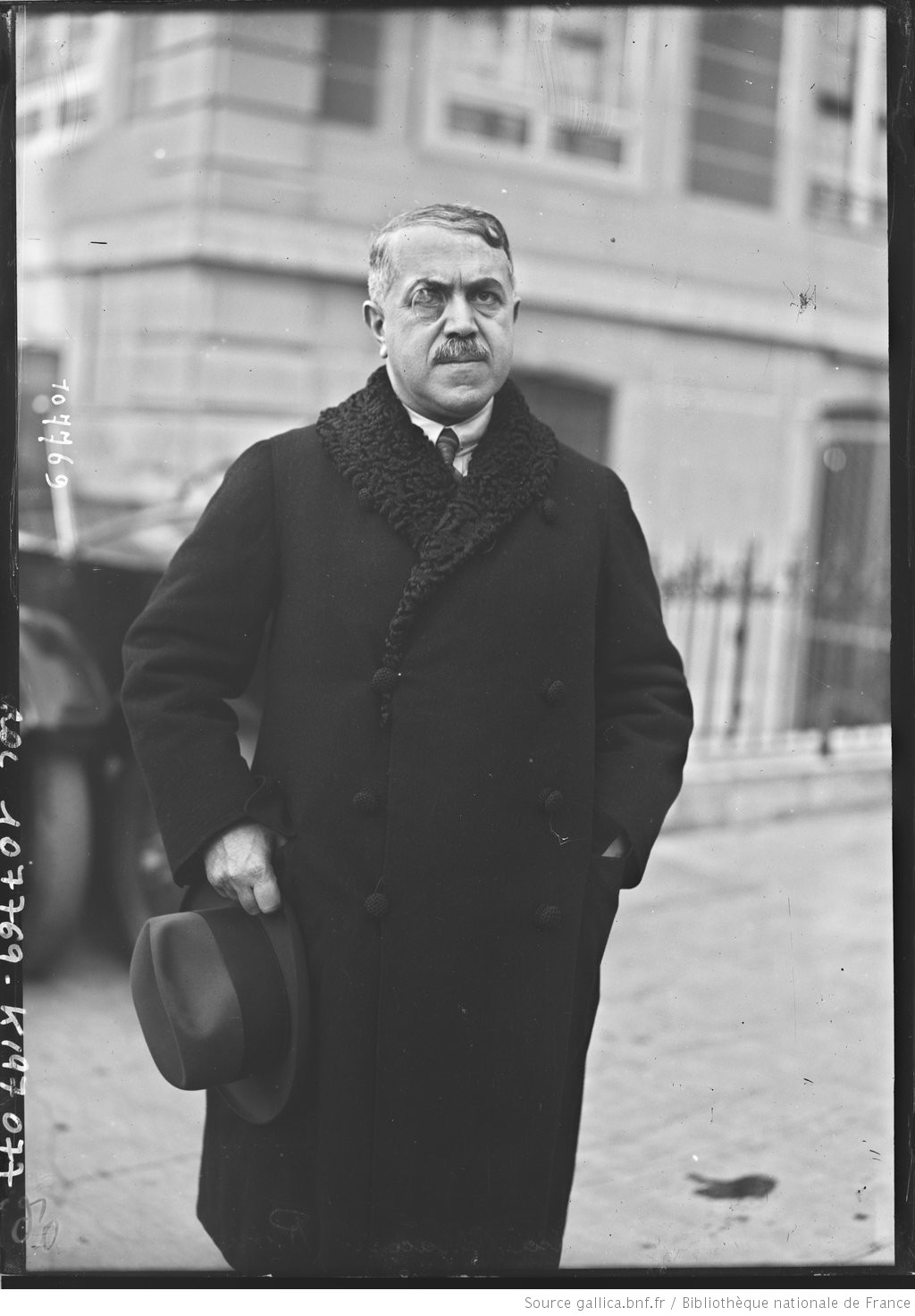
- Loukas Kanakaris-Roufos at a League of Nations congress in Geneva, 1926
- Born: 23 August 1878; Patras, Greece
- Died: 11 November 1949 (aged 71); Athens, Greece
- Occupation: politician

Loukas Kanakaris-Roufos (Greek: Λουκάς Κανακάρης-Ρούφος, 23 August 1878 – 11 November 1949) was a Greek politician.

He was the son of Athanasios Kanakaris-Roufos and a member of the Rouphos family. In the 1905 elections he became a member of the Greek Parliament but failed to be re-elected in 1906. In 1908 however, he succeeded his brother Ioannis Roufos in his parliament seat after his death. In 1913, he resigned his seat and became Governor-General of Crete, a post he held during the island's official union with Greece in December 1913 and until April 1915. Soon after he was re-elected into Parliament, and in September 1916 he became Minister for the Interior. Despite his friendship with Eleftherios Venizelos, he sided with King Constantine I during the National Schism. Following Venizelos' victory in 1917, he was imprisoned until 1920. In the 1920 elections he was again elected to Parliament. In 1922 he served twice briefly as Minister for National Economy, in March–April and from May until the outbreak of the 1922 Revolution in September. In between, he headed the Greek delegation to the talks at Genoa aimed at resolving the ongoing Greco-Turkish War.

On 20 September 1925, he was appointed Minister for National Education and Religious Affairs in the dictatorial government of Theodoros Pangalos, and on 6 November he became Foreign Minister. He failed to be elected in the 1932 elections, but succeeded again in the 1936 elections, the last before the Metaxas dictatorship and World War II. He died at Athens on 11 November 1949.

He was married to Eleni Papageorgakopoulou and had a son, the diplomat and writer Rodis Kanakaris-Roufos.
