= Ioannis Roufos =

Greek politician

Ioannis Roufos Ιωάννης Ρούφος
- Born: 1870; Patras, Greece
- Died: 1908; Athens, Greece
- Occupation: politician

Ioannis Roufos (Greek: Ιωάννης Ρούφος, 1870-1908) was a Greek politician.

He was the son of Georgios Rouphos, a politician and the 11th Mayor of Patras and a grandson of Benizelos Roufos, a Prime Minister of Greece and Mayor of Patras, he is descended from the Rouphos-Kanakaris families with many generations of politicians and descended from southern Italy.

He was a politician of Achaea in 1899, he died early in 1908. The newspaper Neologos wrote on his death in which the Public Council in it did not receive voting condolescences.
