= Achilleas Gerokostopoulos =

Greek politician

Achilleas Gerokostopoulos Αχιλλέας Γεροκωστόπουλος
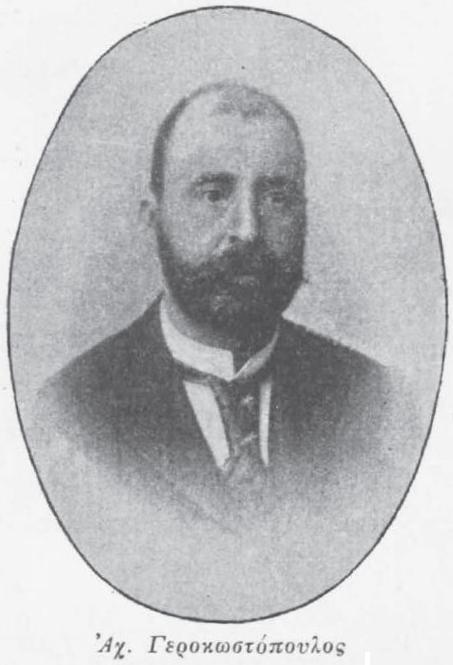
- Born: c. 1850; Patero, Greece
- Died: 1900; Patras, Greece
- Occupations: politician, minister of Education

Achilleas Gerokostopoulos (Greek: Αχιλλέας Γεροκωστόπουλος, c. 1850–1900) was a Greek politician, a member of the Greek parliament and a Minister of Education (1890–1892). He was born in the village Patero, one of the Katsanochoria villages, near Ioannina, and grew up in Patras. He studied law and political sciences in Athens, Paris and Rome.

A partner of Theodoros Deligiannis, he was elected member of the Greek Parliament for Achaea in 1885, 1887 and 1890. During his ministry of education all the regional gymnasiums and athletic gyms in Greece were funded, constructed or reorganized.

He died on the 15 February 1900. He donated a large part of his fortune to the municipality of Patras. He was honoured with a street name (Gerokostopoulou Street) that runs from Karaiskaki Street west to Othonos-Amalias Avenue via the Georgiou I Square with a 150 m gap. The gap has been sealed to traffic since 2004.
