= Rodis Kanakaris-Roufos =

Greek diplomat and writer

Rodis Kanakaris-Roufos Ρόδης Κανακάρης-Ρούφος
- Born: 1924; Patras, Greece
- Died: 1972 (aged 47–48); Kolonaki, Athens, Greece
- Occupation: Writer

Rodis Kanakaris-Roufos (Greek: Ρόδης Κανακάρης-Ρούφος, 1924–1972) was a Greek diplomat and writer.

== Biography ==
He was the son of Loukas Kanakaris-Roufos and a member of the Rouphos family that descended from Sicily and the rest of southern Italy and were politicians from Patras and Achaea. He studied law at the University of Athens in 1949 and also became a foreign minister. He made diplomatic representations in Vienna in Nicosia and in Paris. He took part in the Greek resistance but in 1967 with the arrival of the Regime of the Colonels that took power until 1974, Rodis Kanakaris lost his place.

He had been awarded the Twelve Awards in which along with the National Novel Awards. After his novel Poreia sto skotadi (Πορεία στο σκοτάδι), he was awarded the Kostas Ouranis Award.

He died in Kolonaki in Athens in 1972 and had two sons, including Loukas (1949- ) who became a lawyer, and Athanassios (1952- ) who is a musician.

== Bibliography ==
During his lifetime, he wrote several works with his pseudonym Rodis Provelengios or Proveleggios (Ρόδης Προβελέγγιος). Some of his works include:

| Year | Title | Greek title | English title | Volumes |
|---|---|---|---|---|
| 1954-1958 | Ta chroniuka mias stavroforias | Τα χρονικά μιας σταυροφορίας | The Chronicles Of A Crusade | three volumes |
| 1954 | Poreia sto skotadi | Πορεία στο σκοτάδι | A Route To Darkness | - |
| 1959 | Chalkini epochi | Χάλκινη εποχή | Bronze Age | - |
| 1957 | I imera tis krisis | Η ημέρα της κρίσης | The Day Of The Crisis | - |
| 1967 | I Griakyloi | Οι Γραικύλοι | - | - |
| 1970 | I metamorfoseis tou Alarichou | Οι μεταμορφώσεις του Αλάριχου | Alaric's Metamorphosis | - |
| 1974 | Epoligi 1 | Επιλογή 1 | Epilogue 1 | - |
