= Cathedral of Saint Andrew, Patras =

Greek Orthodox cathedral in Patras

Cathedral of Saint Andrew Patras
- Greek: Καθεδρικός Ναός Αγίου Ανδρέα
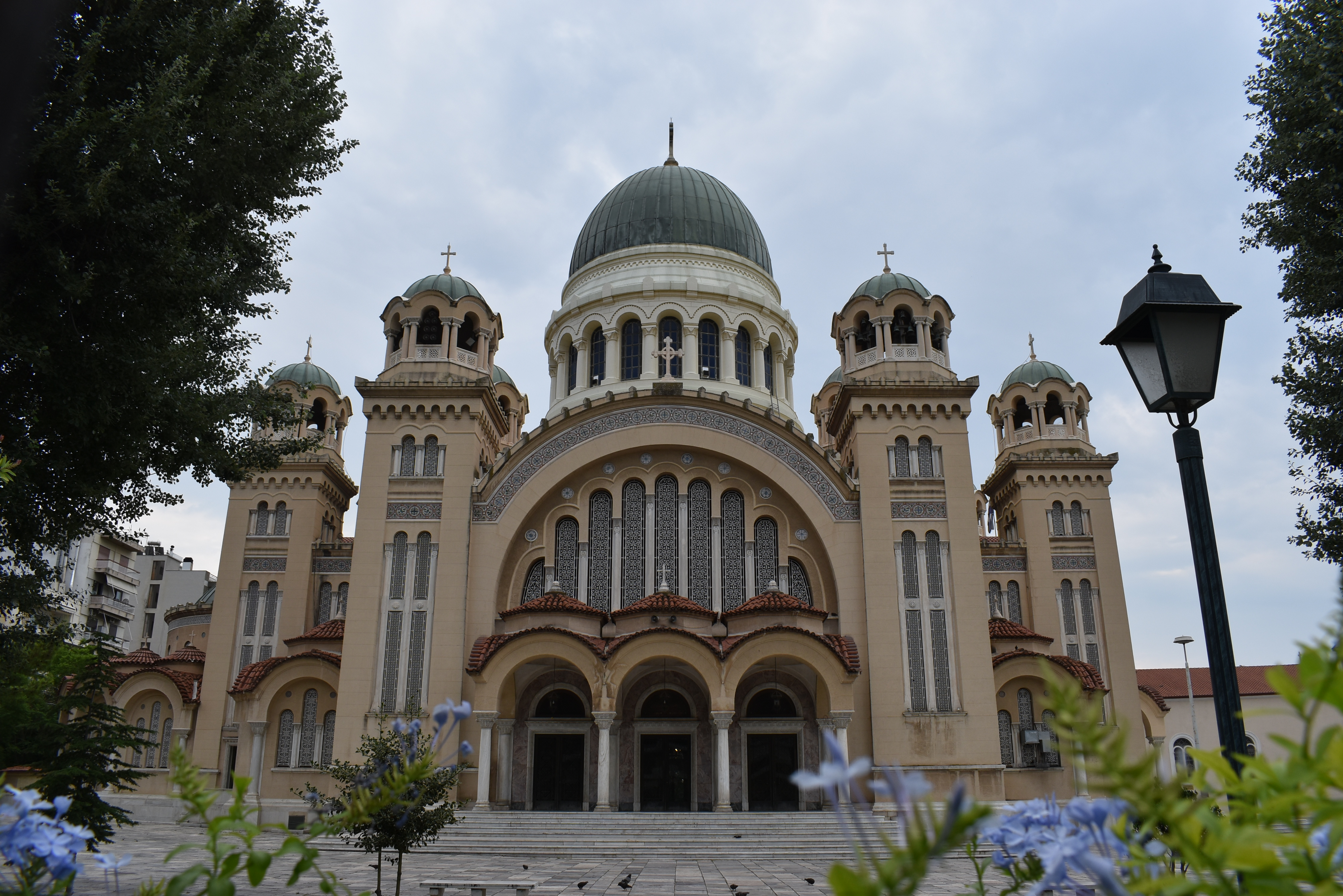
- Cathedral of Saint Andrew; Patras
- 38.2425°N 21.728056°E
- Location: Patras
- Country: Greece
- Denomination: Greek Orthodox
- Website: Saint Andrew's Cathedral

History
- Status: Cathedral
- Dedication: Andrew the Apostle

Architecture
- Functional status: Active
- Architect(s): Anastasios Metaxas; Georgios Nomikos
- Style: Byzantine architecture/Neo-Byzantine
- Groundbreaking: 1908
- Completed: 1974

Specifications
- Capacity: 1,900 m^{2} (area); 7,000 worshipers
- Length: 59.8 metres (196 ft)
- Width: 51.8 metres (170 ft)

Administration
- Metropolis: Patras

The Cathedral of Saint Andrew also called Cathedral Church of Saint Andrew (Greek: Ιερός Ναός Αγίου Ανδρέου) or simply Hagios Andreas is a Greek Orthodox basilica in the west side of the city center of Patras in Greece. Along with the nearby old church of St. Andrew (Greek: Παλαιός Ιερός Ναός Αγίου Ανδρέου), it constitutes a place of pilgrimage for Christians from all over the world. It is dedicated to the First-called Apostle of Christ, Saint Andrew.

== History ==
Construction of the Greek Byzantine-style church began in 1908 under the supervision of the architect Anastasios Metaxas, followed by Georgios Nomikos. It was inaugurated 66 years later, in 1974. According to University of Patras professor Charis Alk. Apostolopoulos who has extensively studied the church building, the church has a surface area of 1,900 m^{2} on the ground floor and additionally 700 m^{2} on the first level (used as a gynaeconitis). The church has a length of ~60 m, width ~52 m and has a capacity of 7,000 people. Other sources give similar numbers for the size of the surface area (there are different numbers depending on the inclusion or not of the first level).

It is considered the largest Orthodox church in Greece and the third largest Byzantine-style church in the Balkans, after the Cathedral of Saint Sava in Belgrade and Alexander Nevsky Cathedral in Sofia. Other sources consider Church of St. Panteleimon of Acharnai as the largest one in Greece. Over the central dome there is a 5-meter-long, gold-plated cross and over the other domes, there are 12 smaller crosses. These crosses symbolize Jesus and His apostles. The interior of the church is decorated with Byzantine-style wall paintings and mosaics.

== Relics ==
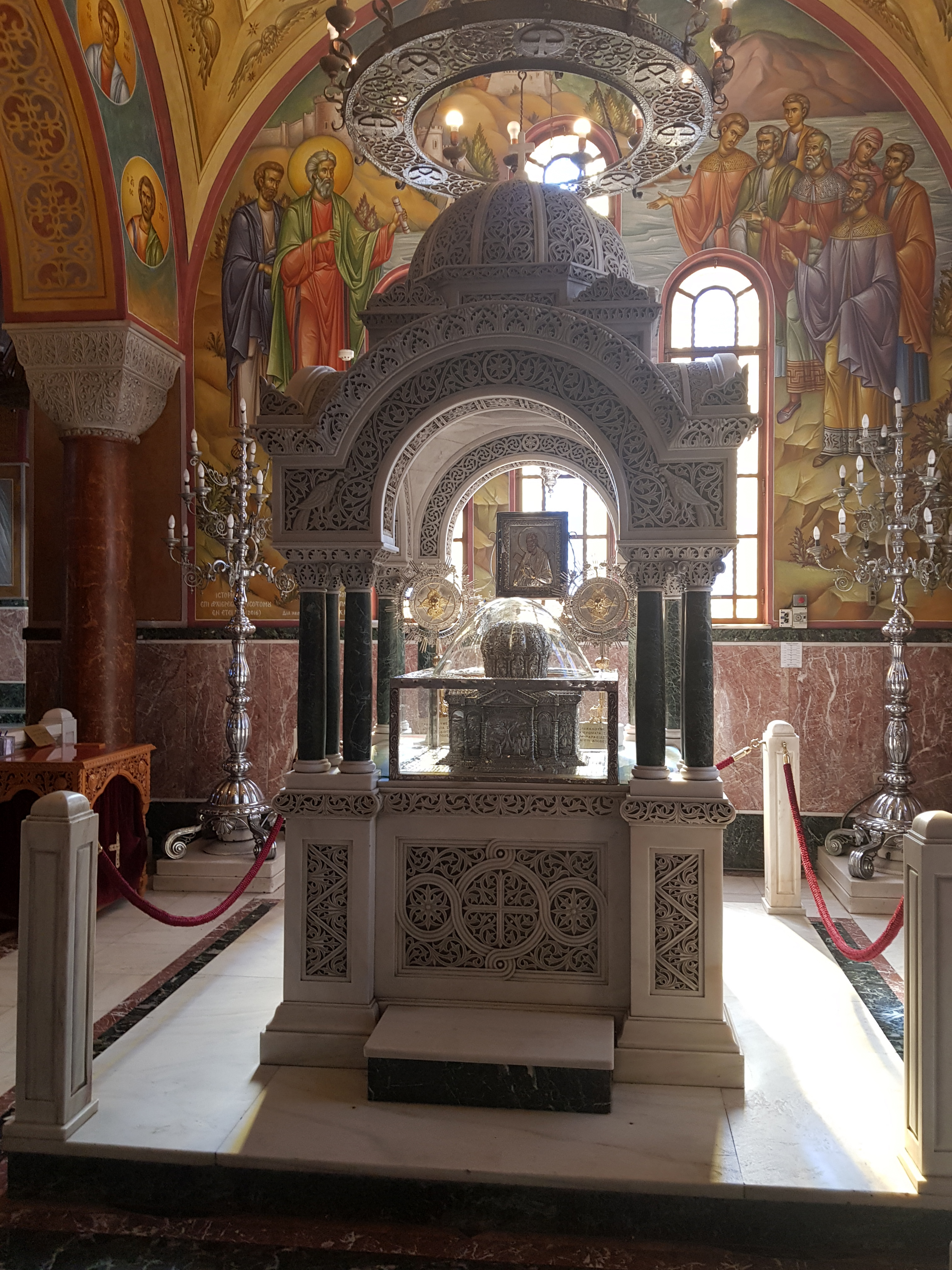
Relics of St Andrew, a donation by the Catholic Church in 1964

Relics of the apostle Saint Andrew are stored in the church. They consist of the little finger, part of the top of the cranium of the Apostle, and small portions of the cross on which he was martyred, all kept in a special shrine. The holy skull of the Apostle was sent there from St. Peter's Basilica, Rome in September 1964, on the orders of Pope Paul VI. Cardinal Bea led the party of 15 cardinals that presented the relic to Bishop Constantine of Patras on 24 September 1964. Thousands of people (among them Prime Minister Georgios Papandreou) and many Greek Orthodox bishops participated in the reception ceremony for the skull. After a procession through the streets of Patras, the skull was placed in a special silver miter inside the church. The cross of St. Andrew was taken from Greece during the Crusades by the Duke of Burgundy, and parts were kept in the Abbey of St. Victor in Marseille since the Middle Ages. These were returned to Patras on 19 January 1980, presented to the Bishop Nicodemus of Patras by a Roman Catholic delegation led by Cardinal Roger Etchegaray.

== Gallery ==
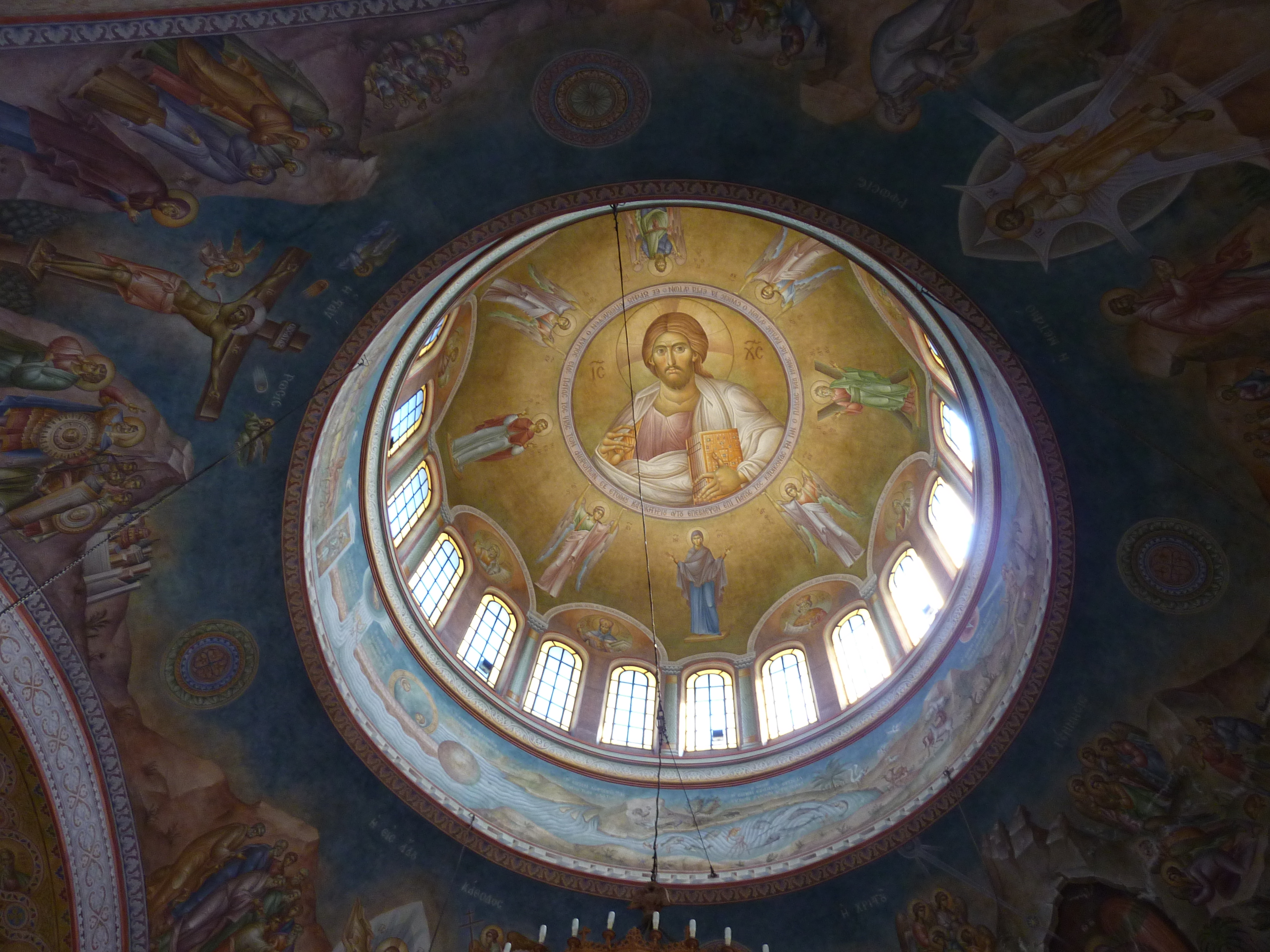
The dome of Saint Andrew cathedral depicting Christ Pantocrator

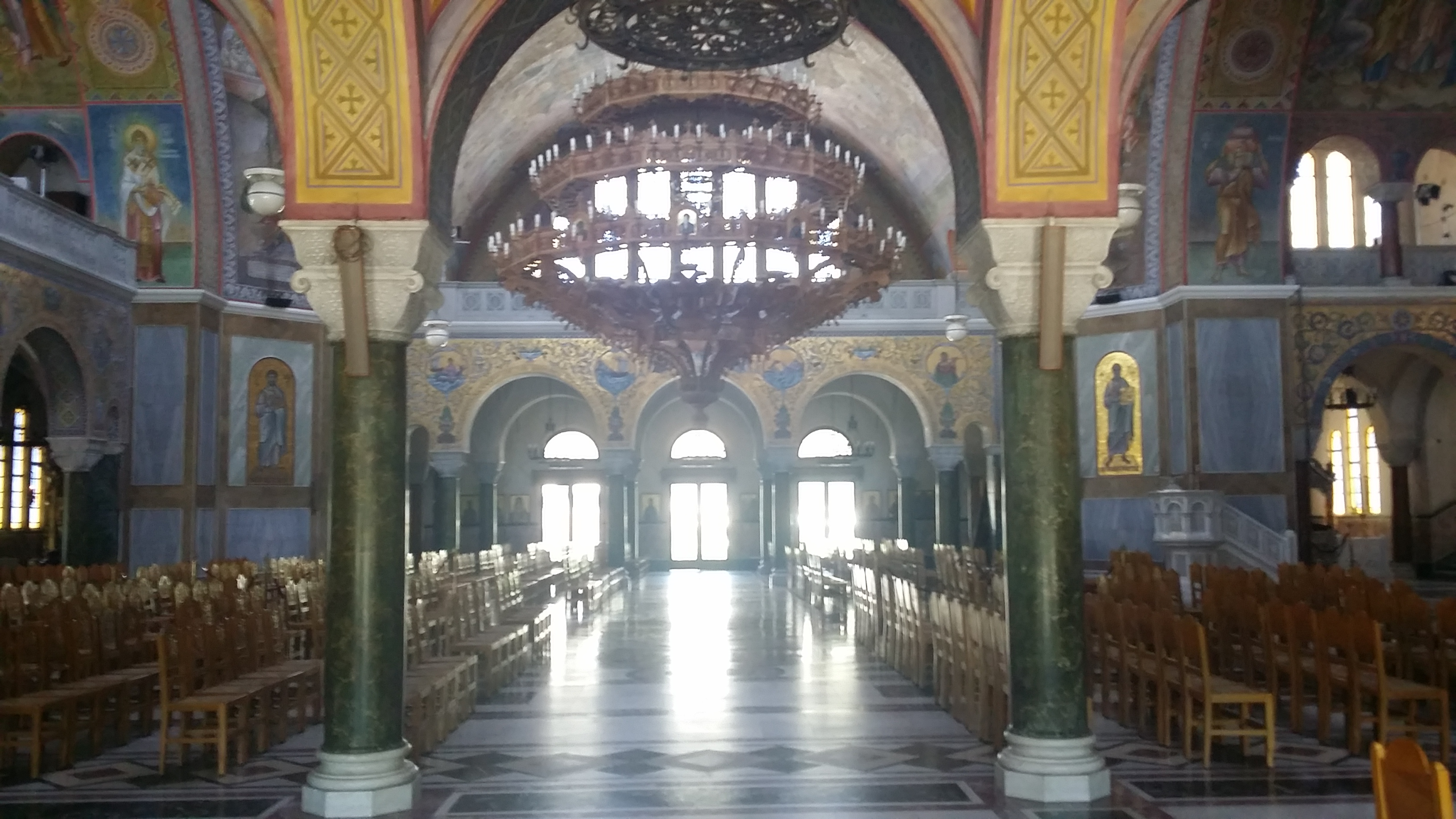
Interior

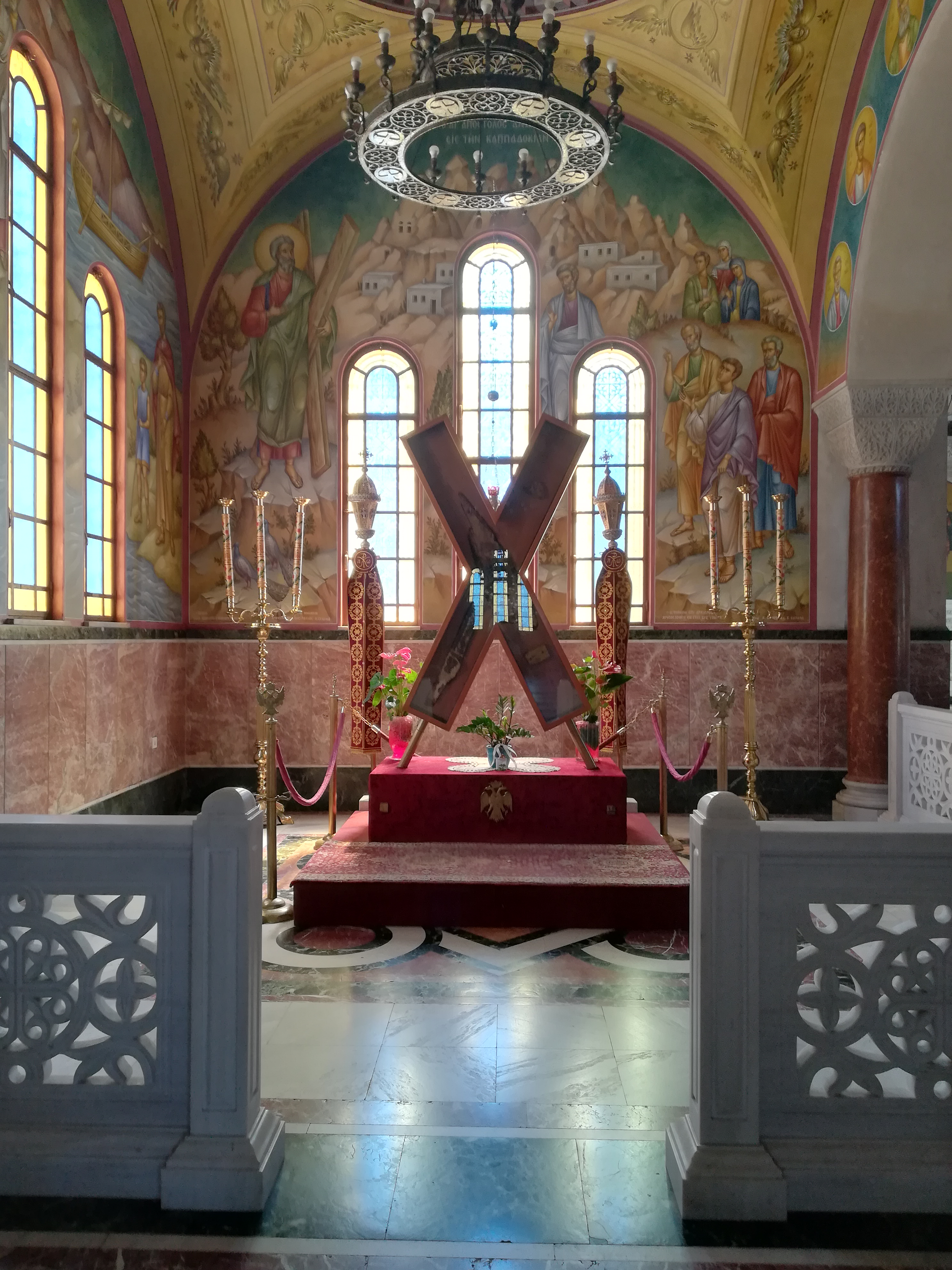
Interior

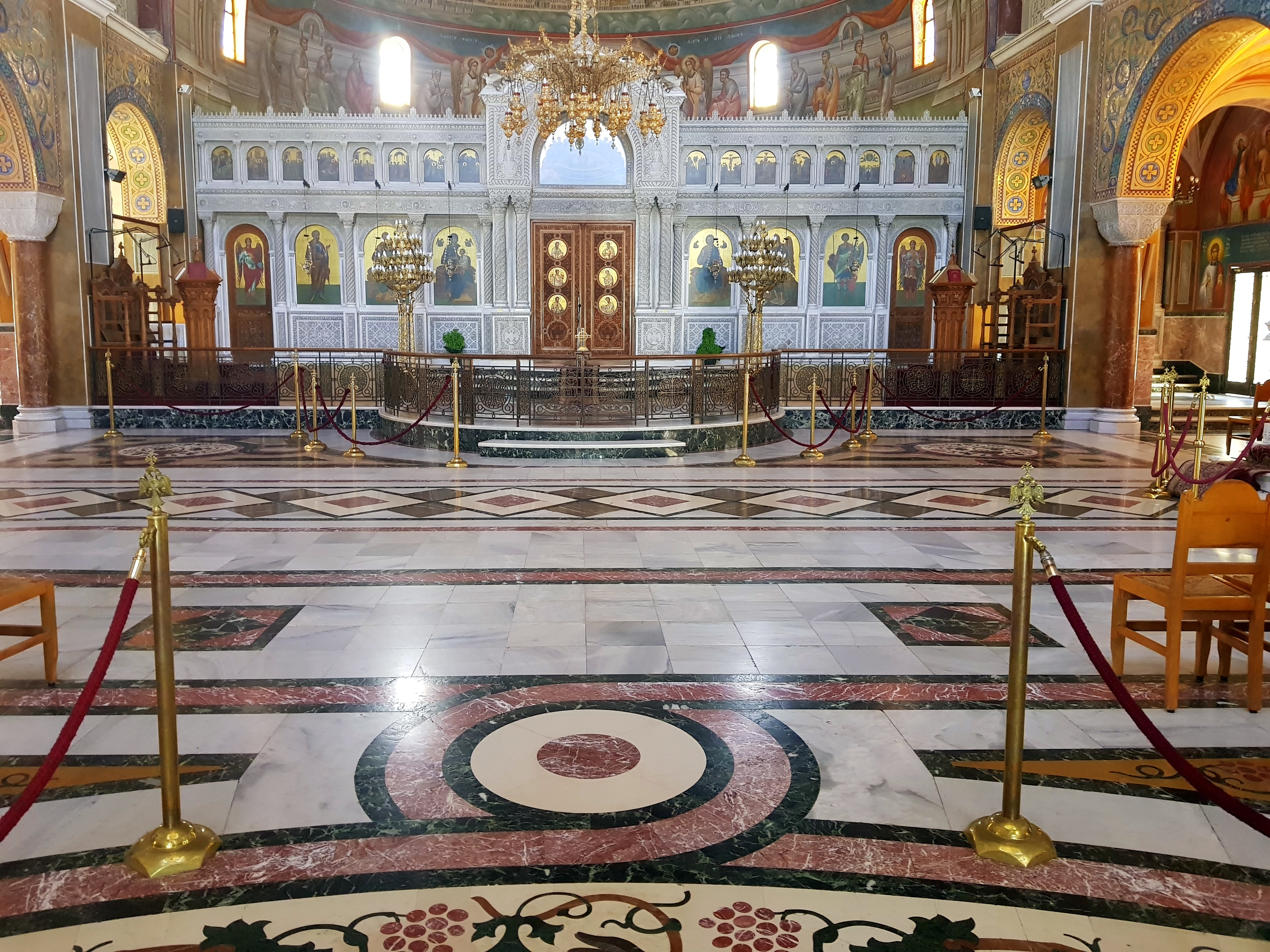
Interior

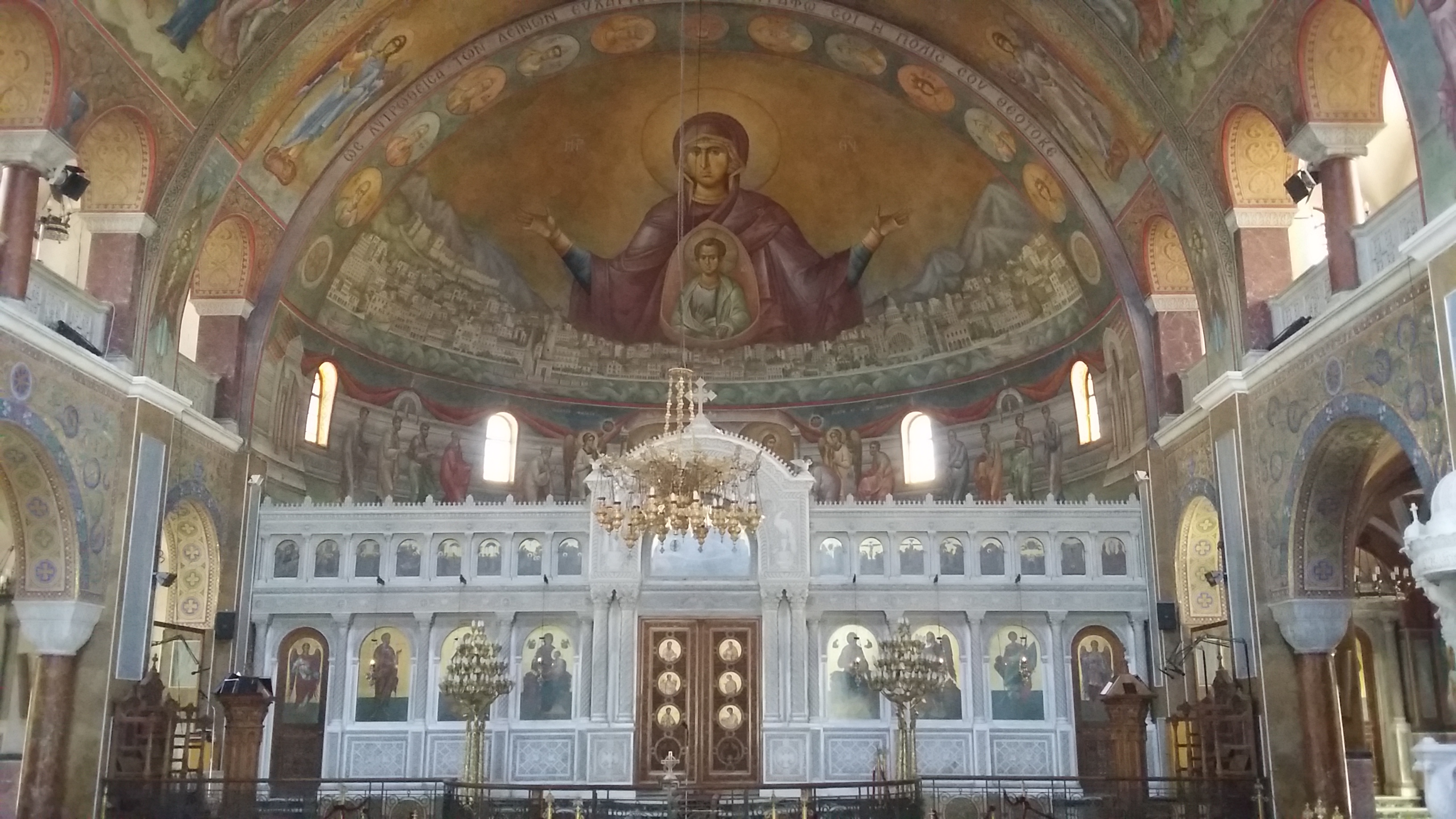
View of the marble Templon and the mural paintings depicting Panagia protecting the city of Patras

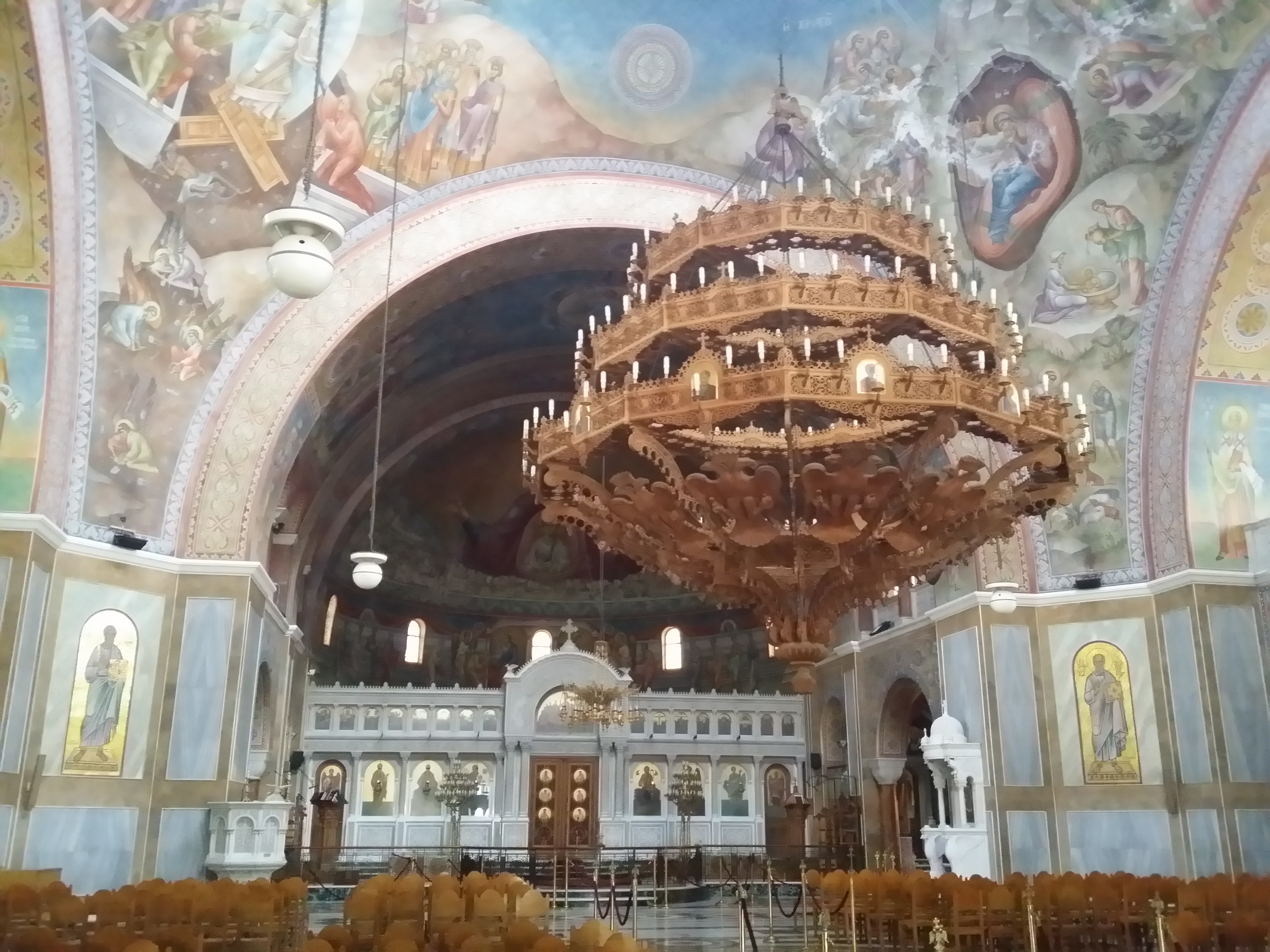
Interior view of the church. Beneath the dome hangs the central circular chandelier with depictions of the saints and apostles which in traditional Greek orthodox churches is called the horos.

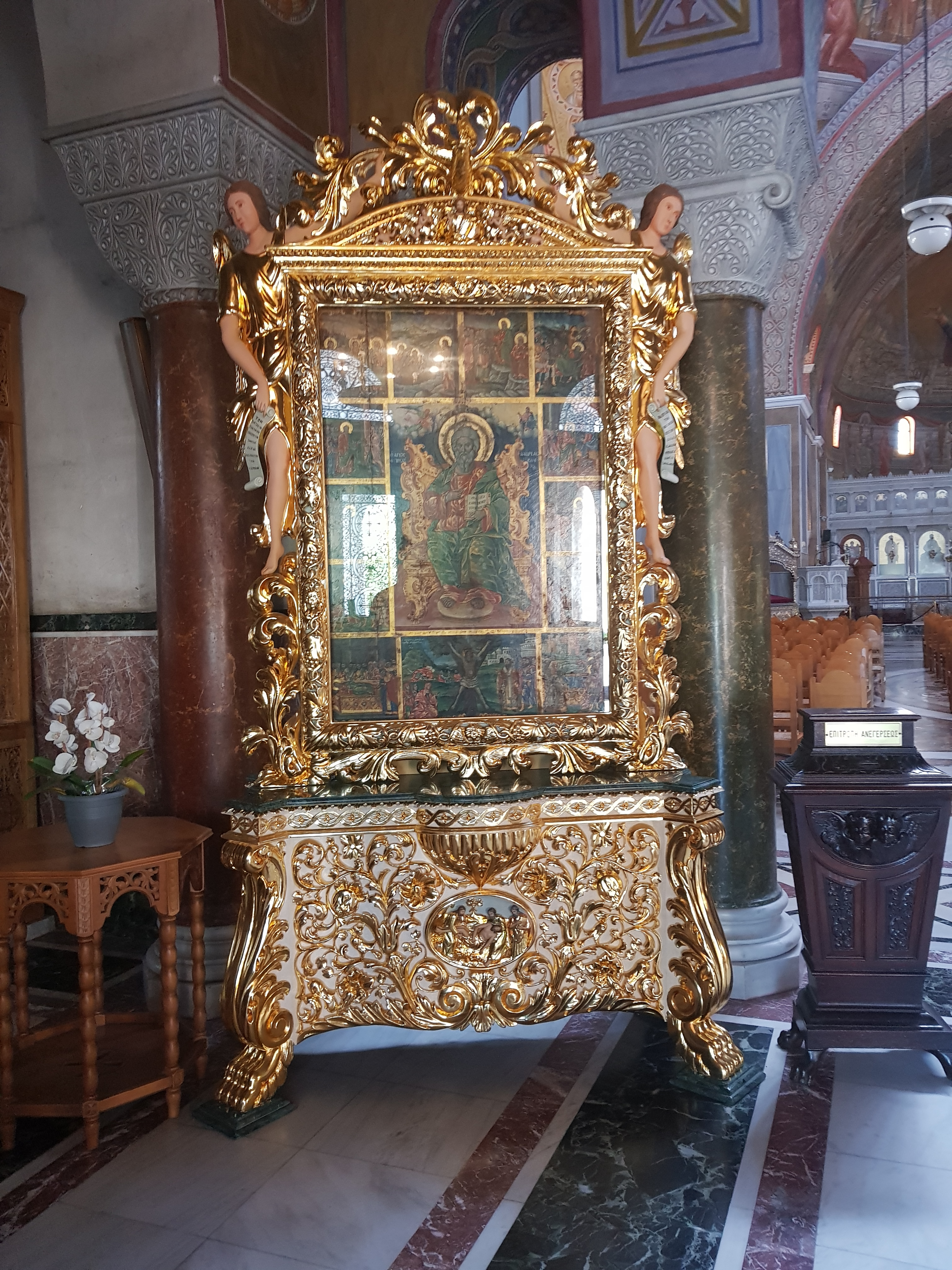
Icon of Saint Andrew

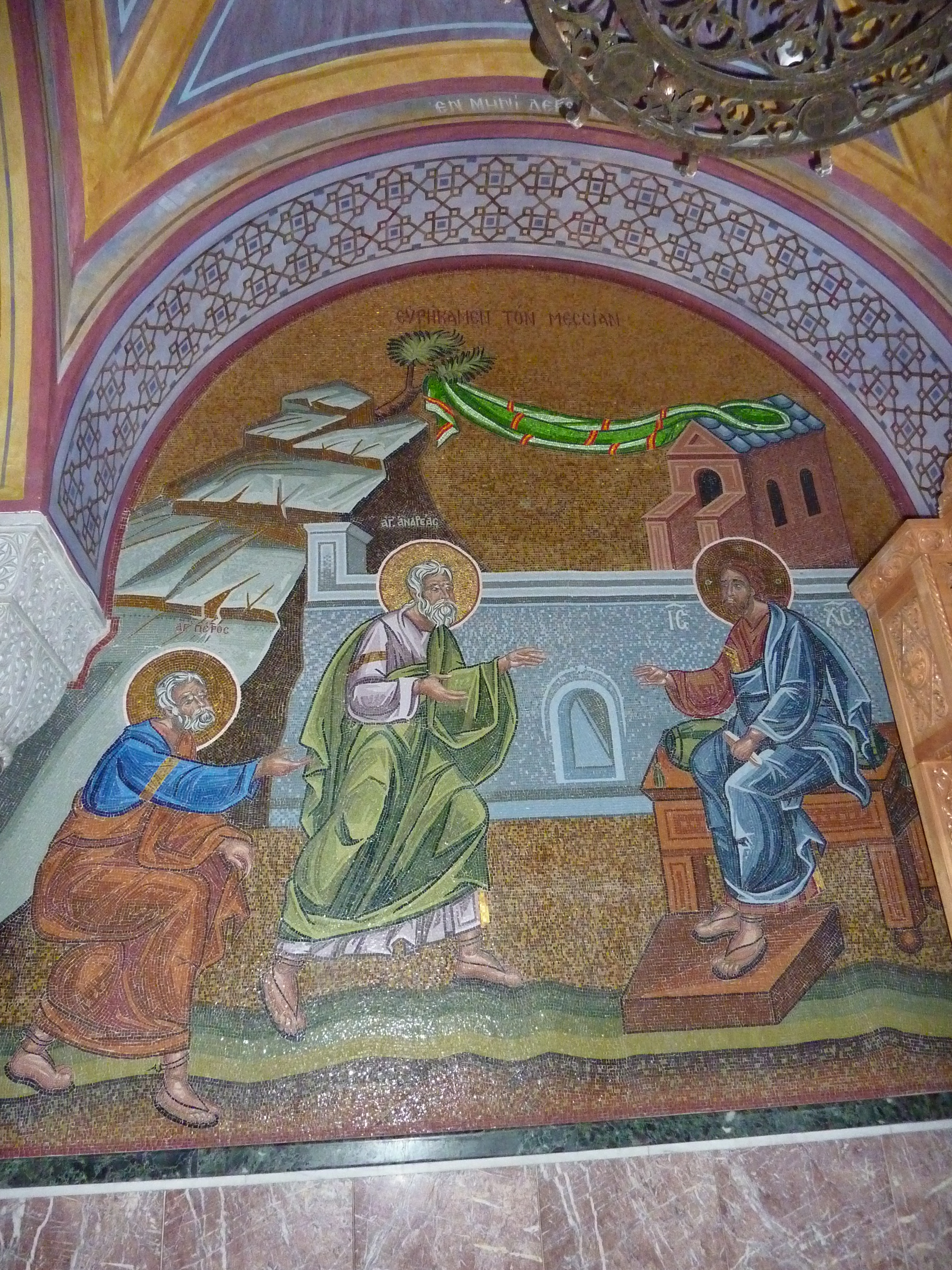
Mural depicting the meeting of Saint Apostole Andrew and Saint Peter with Jesus Christ. We read the inscription in Greek "Εὑρήκαμεν τὸν Μεσσίαν" ("We have found the Messiah”, John 1:41)

== The old Temple ==
The older, much smaller, cathedral of St Andrew is located beside the current one. It was designed by Lysandros Kaftanzoglou in the late 19th century.

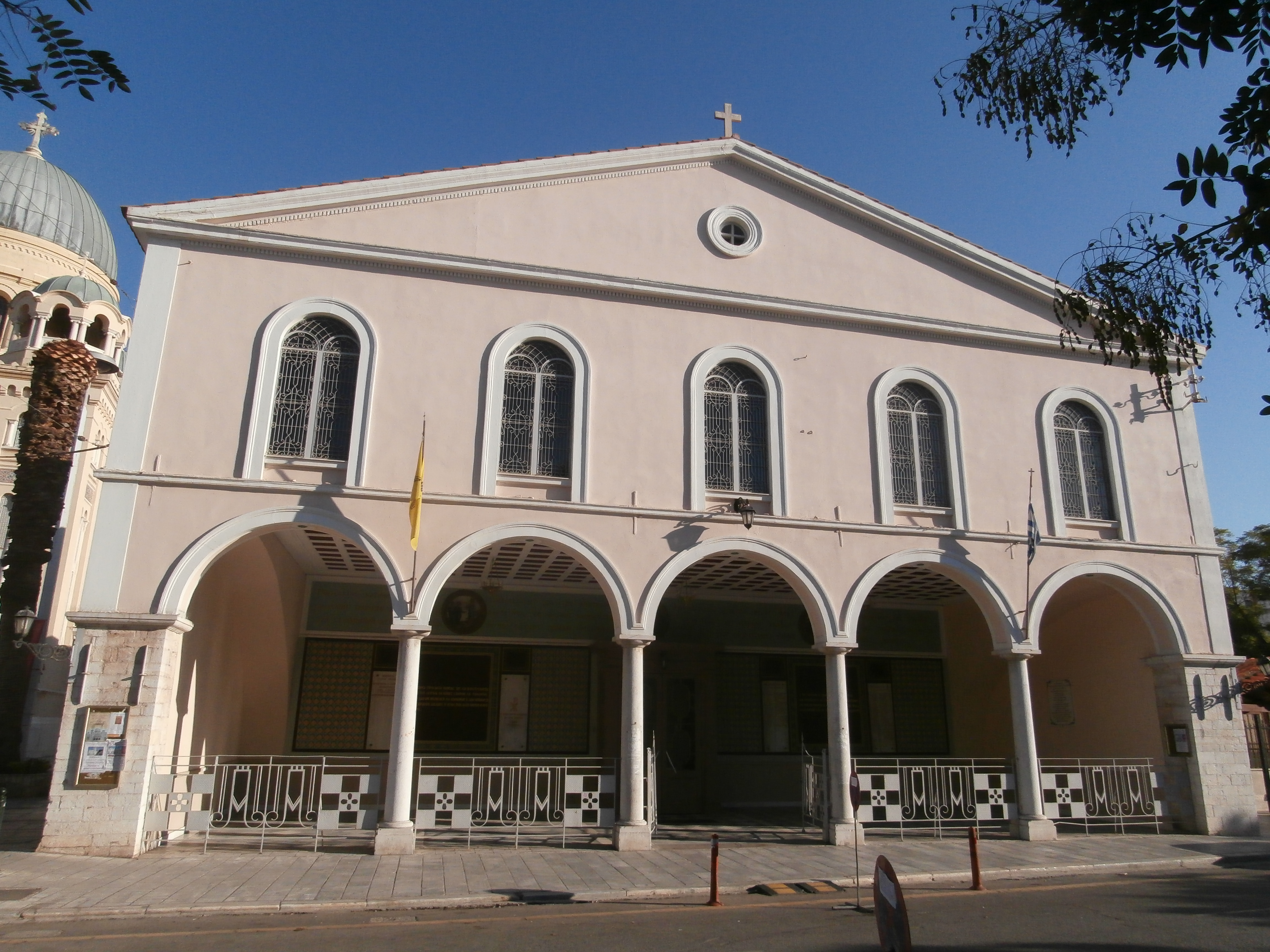
View

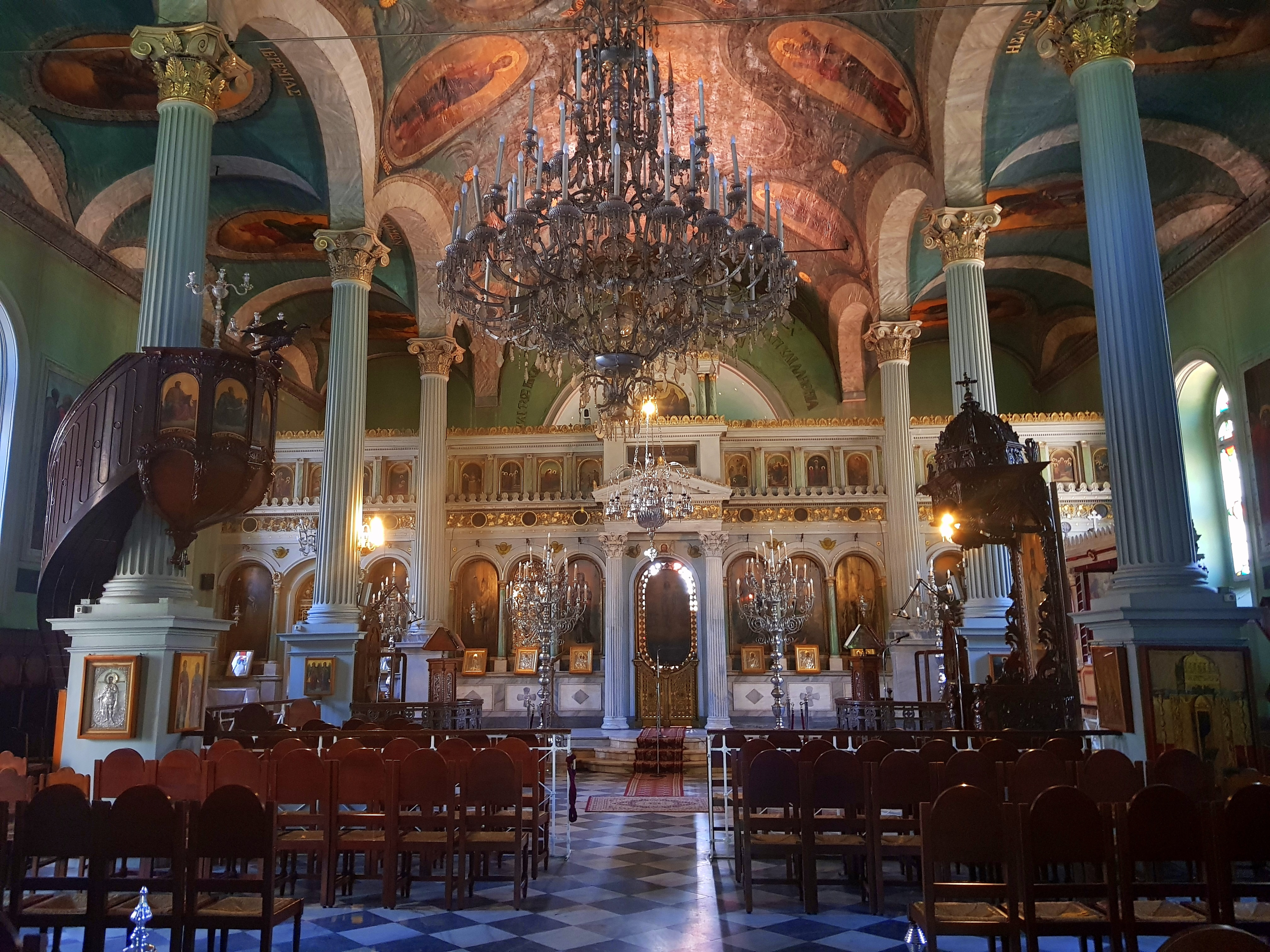
Interior

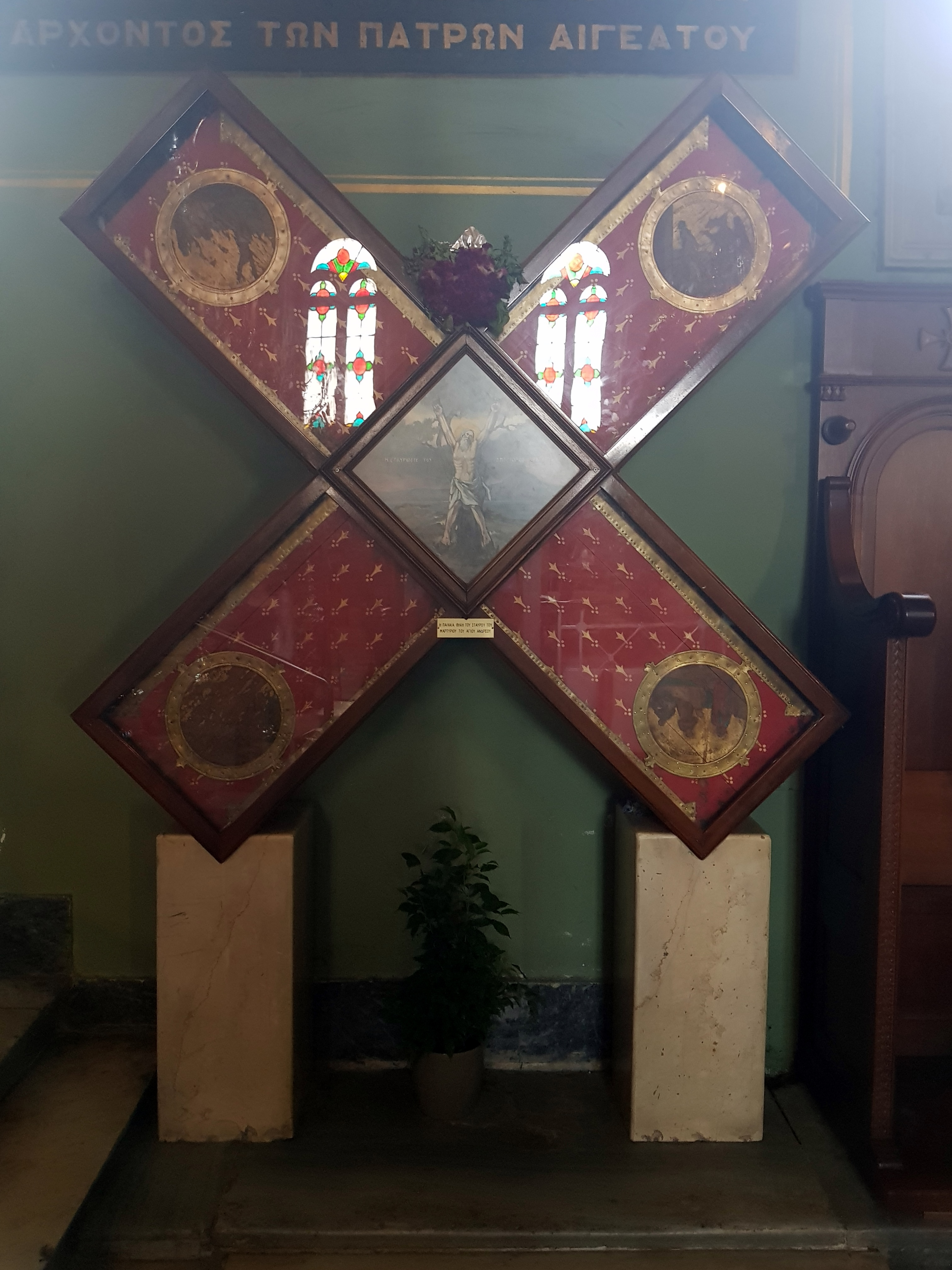
Interior

== See also ==
- Apollon Theatre (Patras)
- Archaeological Museum of Patras
- Rio-Antirio Bridge
- List of largest Eastern Orthodox church buildings

== Sources ==
- Μ. Λεφαντζής, «Ο μεγάλος ναοδόμος Γεώργιος Νομικός», Περιοδικό Αρχιτέκτονες, Τεύχος 39, Μάιος-Ιούνιος 2003
- Χ. Αποστολόπουλος, «Ιστορικά Στοιχεία από την Ανέγερση-Βλάβες στη Δομή του Νέου Ναού του Αγίου Ανδρέα Πατρών», 3ο Εθνικό Συνέδριο, Ήπιες Επεμβάσεις για την Προστασία των Ιστορικών Κατασκευών, Νέες Τάσεις Σχεδιασμού, 9–11 Απριλίου 2009 Θεσσαλονίκη, σελ. 441–450.
- Κώστας Τριαντάφυλλου. «0 νέος μεγάλος ναός στην Πάτρα του Πολιούχου της Αγίου Ανδρέα», Πελοποννησιακή Πρωτοχρονιά (1962) 306-3
