= Ethnikis Antistaseos Square (Patras) =

Square in Patras, Greece

Coordinates: 38.2492°N 21.7375°E

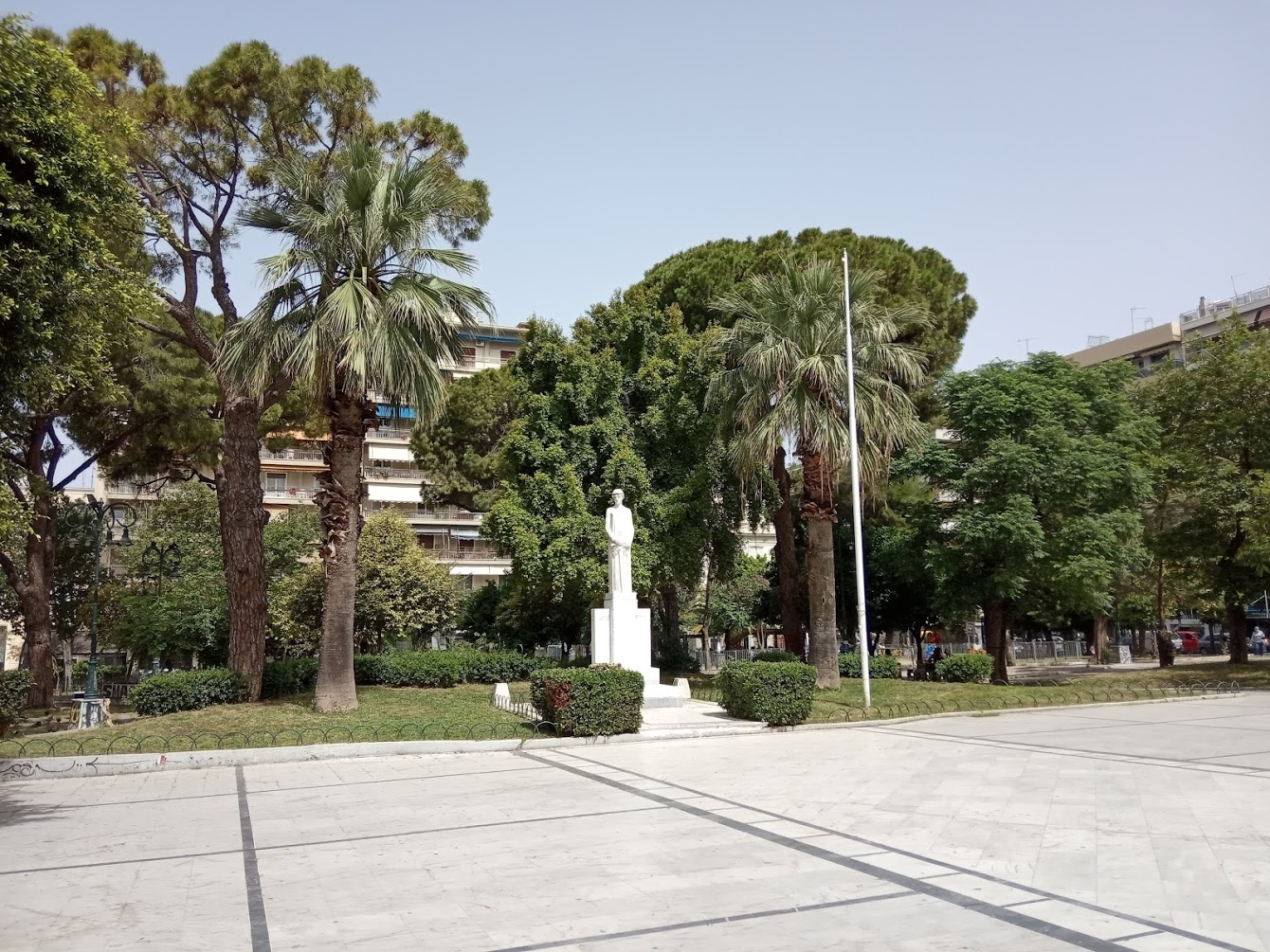
Ethnikis Antistaseos Square, view from Maizonos Street.

Ethnikis Antistaseos Square (Greek: Πλατεία Εθνικής Αντιστάσεως) is a central square in the city of Patras, Greece.

== Location and history ==
The square is defined by the Aratou Street in the northeast, Maizonos Street in the southeast, Kolokotroni Street in the southwest and Riga Feraiou Street in the northwest. Originally the square was intended as a market, but it was planted with trees and became a public square known as "the Queen's garden" («της βασίλισσας το περιβόλι»). Its original name was Omonoia Square (Πλατεία Ομονοίας, "Concord Square"), but it was renamed after Queen Olga of Greece – the city's other major central square, Georgiou I Square, is named after Queen Olga's husband, King George I of Greece.

After the fall of the Greek monarchy in 1974, the square was officially renamed to Ethnikis Antistaseos ("National Resistance Square") after the Greek Resistance against the Axis Occupation of Greece during World War II. A marble monument to the Resistance forms a centerpiece of the square. The square is lined with cafes and restaurants, making it very popular especially during the summer months.

== Gallery ==
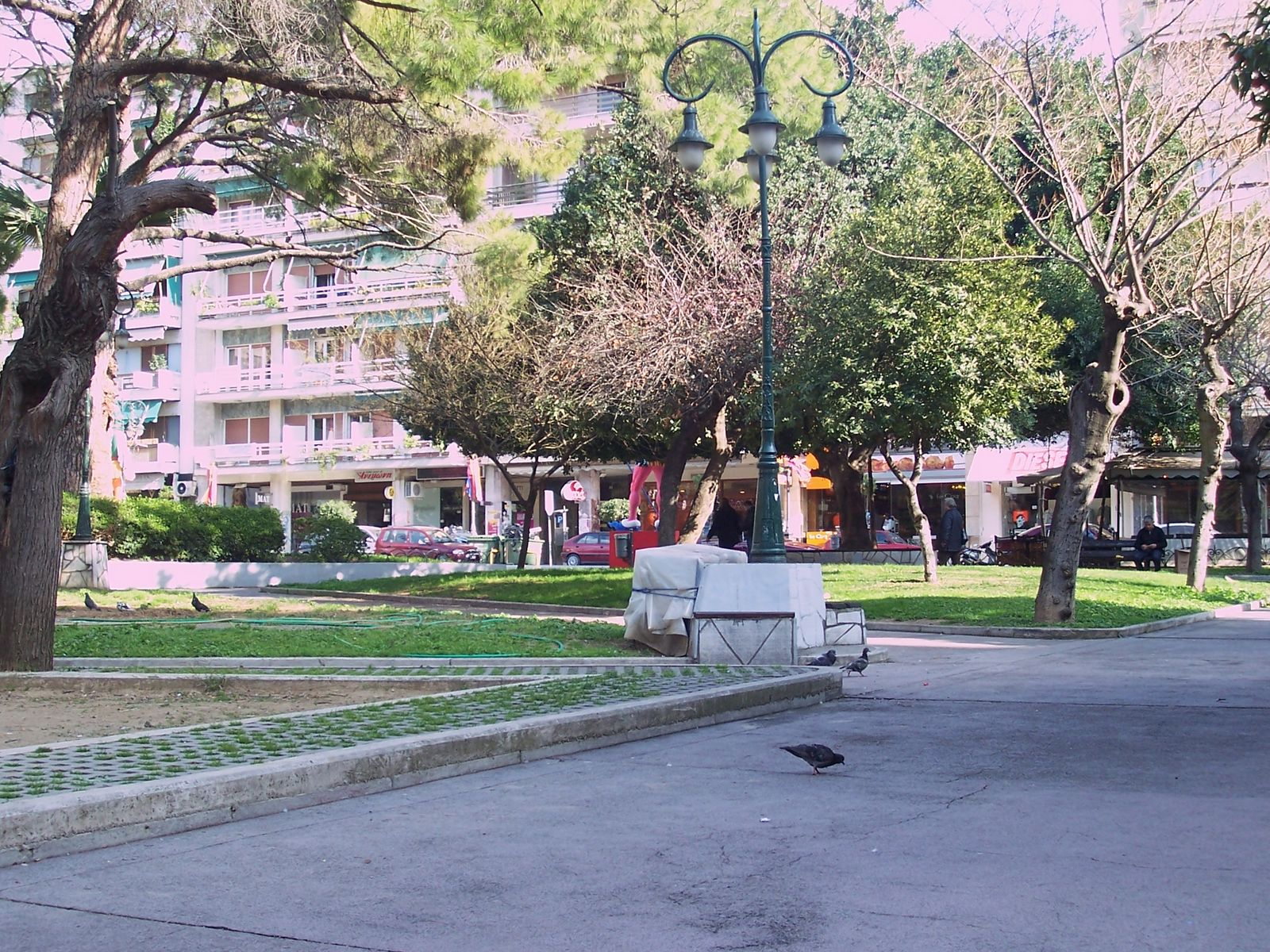
A view of Ethnikis Antistaseos square

== Sources ==
- "Ethnikis Antistaseos Square (Olga's)". Patras Municipality. Archived from the original on 23 June 2012.
