= Dimitrios Patrinos =

Greek politician

Dimitrios Patrinos Δημήτριος Πατρινός 14th Mayor of Patras 1883-1887
- Born: Unknown; Patras, Greece
- Died: 1903; Greece
- Occupations: politician, mayor of Patras

Dimitrios Patrinos (Greek: Δημήτριος Πατρινός, died 1903) was a Greek MP for Achaia and a mayor of Patras.

Patrinos was born in Patras and was the only son of merchant and politician Panagiotis Patrinos. He was first elected MP in 1868.

He became mayor of the city of Patras where he served from 1883 until 1887. He took over the municipality with 400,000 drachmas in debt. During his tenure he caused a lot of backlash for his insistence on establishing a municipal secret police.

He died in 1903. He survived with his wife which she was a relative of the prime minister Dimitrios Voulgaris.

Preceded by Athanasios Kanakaris-Roufos	Mayor of Patras; July 3, 1883 - September 30, 1887	Succeeded by Georgios Roufos
