= Athanasios Kanakaris-Roufos =

Greek politician

Athanasios Kanakaris-Roufos Αθανάσιος Κανακάρης-Ρούφος
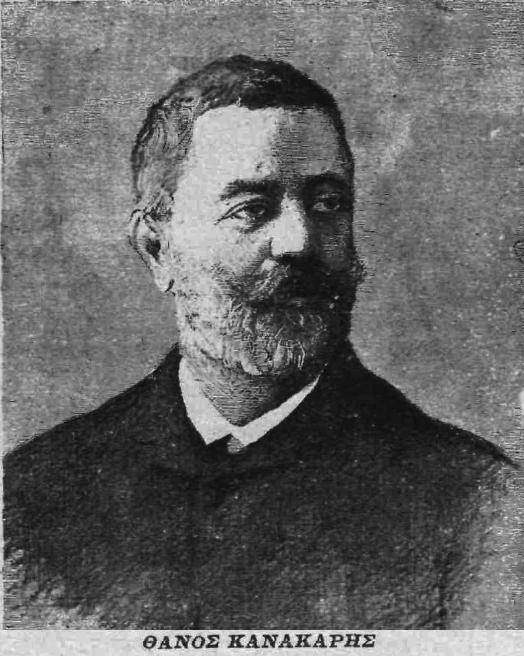
- Born: 1830; Patras, Greece
- Died: 1902 (aged 71–72); Patras, Greece
- Occupations: politician, 13th Mayor of Patras

Athanasios Kanakaris-Roufos (Greek: Αθανάσιος Κανακάρης-Ρούφος, 1830–1902) was a Greek politician from Achaea. He was mayor of the city of Patras from 1879 to 1883.

He was the son of Benizelos Roufos and brother of Georgios Roufos. Together with his brother, he helped with the reformation of Patras. During his time as mayor he ran a gaslight company in Krya Itea, planted olives southwest of downtown, opened roads, constructed Omonoia Square, ran public schools, the Markato market and constructed the race track. He died in 1902. He raised two sons Loukas Kanakaris-Roufos and Vasileios Roufos.

Preceded by Periklis Kalamogdartis	Mayor of Patras; September 6, April 8, 1879 - July 2, 1883	Succeeded by Dimitrios Patrinos
Preceded by Aristomenis Kontogouris	Mayor of Patras; September 12, 1895 - September 5, 1899	Succeeded by Dimitrios Votsis
