= Georgiou I Square =

Square in Patras, Greece

George I Square
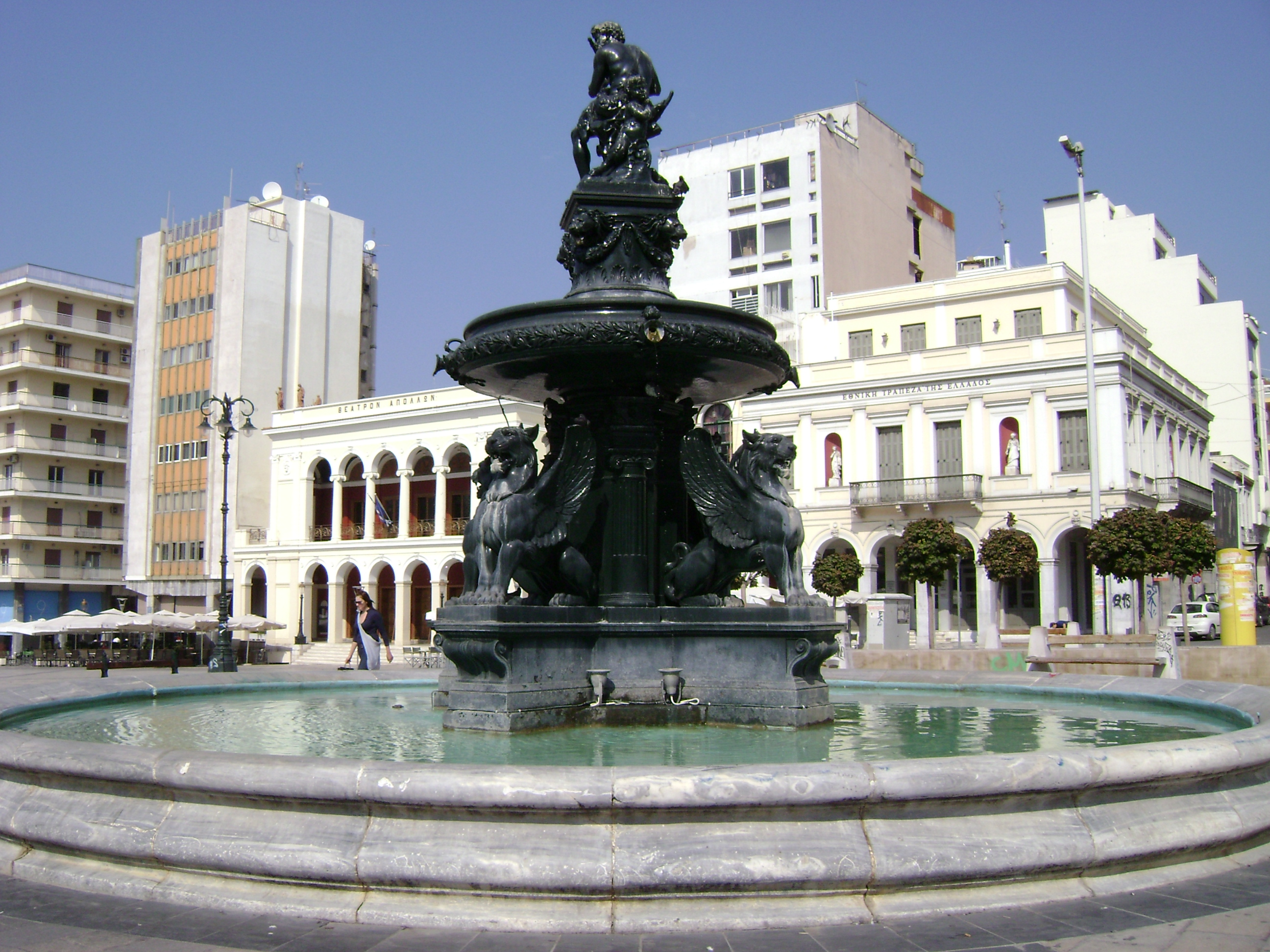
- View of the square

- Location within Patras
- Namesake: George I of Greece
- Maintained by: Municipality of Patras
- Location: Patras, Greece
- Coordinates: 38.2462°N 21.7351°E

Construction
- Completion: 1829

Other
- Designer: Stamatis Voulgaris

Georgiou I Square (Greek: Πλατεία Γεωργίου Αʹ) is the central square of Patras, Greece. The square is named after King George I of Greece. It is crossed by Maizonos, Korinthou and Gerokostopoulou streets. The neoclassical Apollon Theatre is situated on the northeast side of the square.

== History ==
Georgiou I Square was built under the Kapodistrias government as a part of the 1829 plans by Stamatis Voulgaris to rebuild the devastated centre of Patras after the Greek War of Independence. Unlike the old city, the new city was built according to a grid plan with several large squares.

The square has been renamed several times: Dimokratias at first, then Kalamogdarti, Othonos, Kentriki, Thomopoulou, Ethniki, Palligenesias and since 1863 Georgiou I. In the square there are two fountains, constructed in Denmark.

== Gallery ==
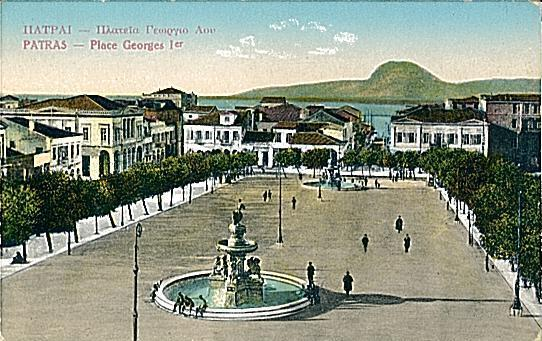
Georgiou I Square in the early 20th century

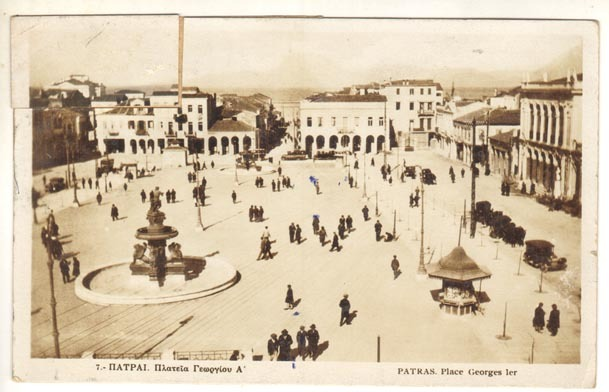
The square in 1910

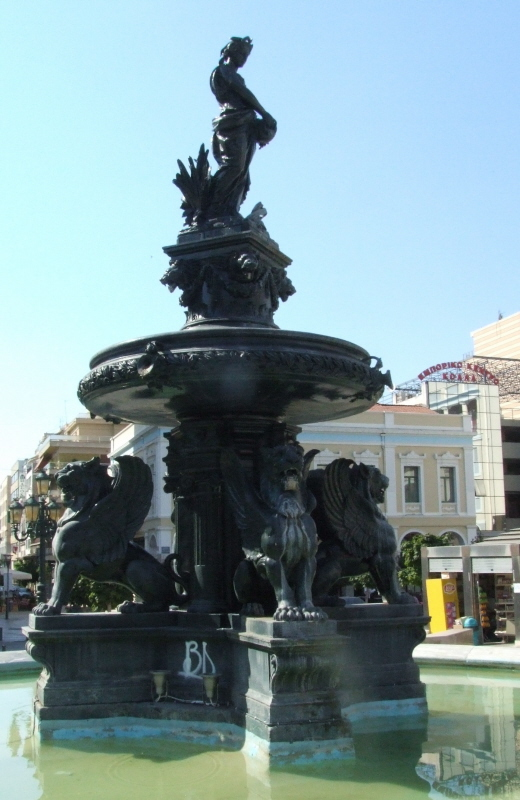
Detail of the one fountain

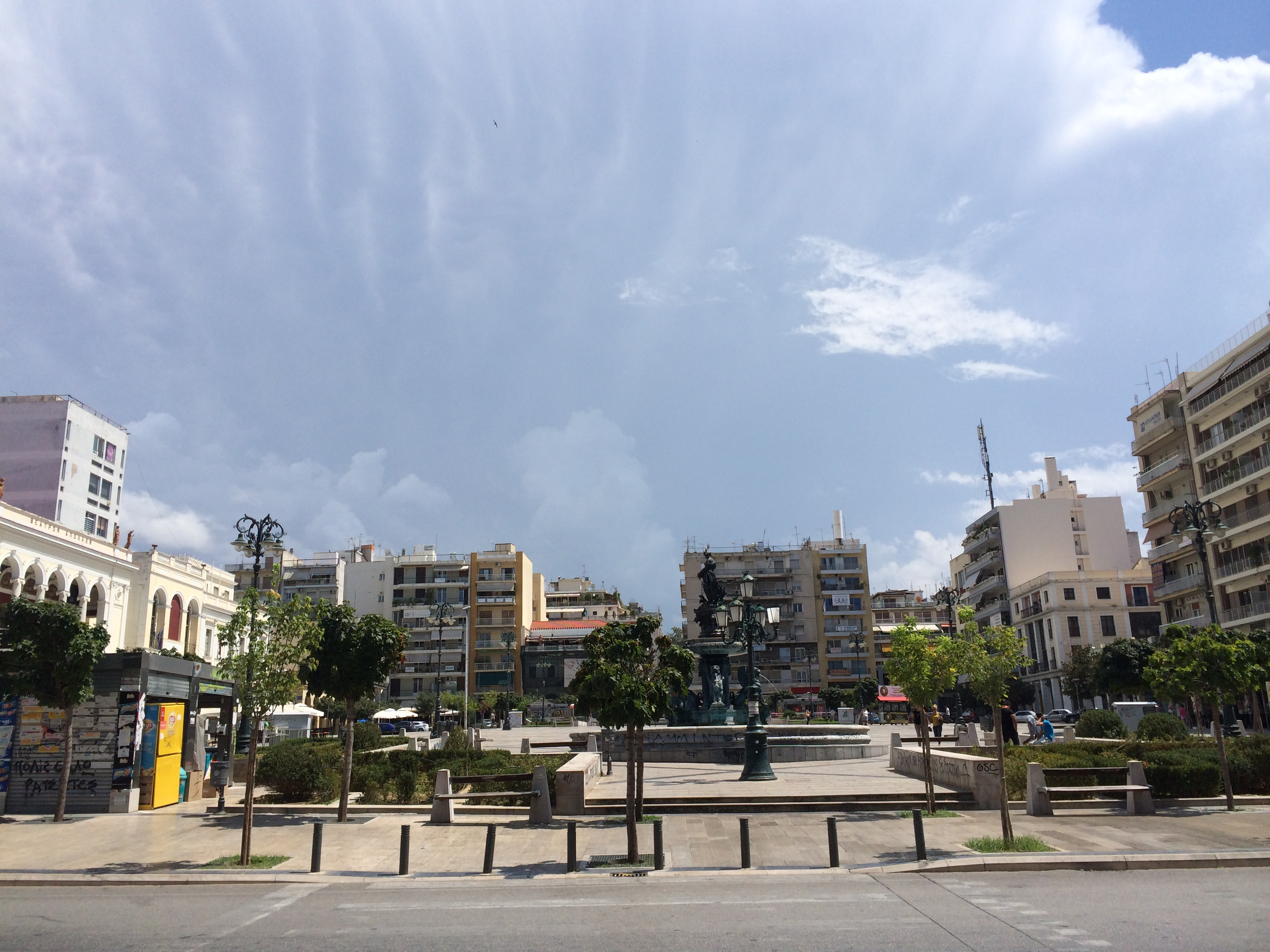
A view

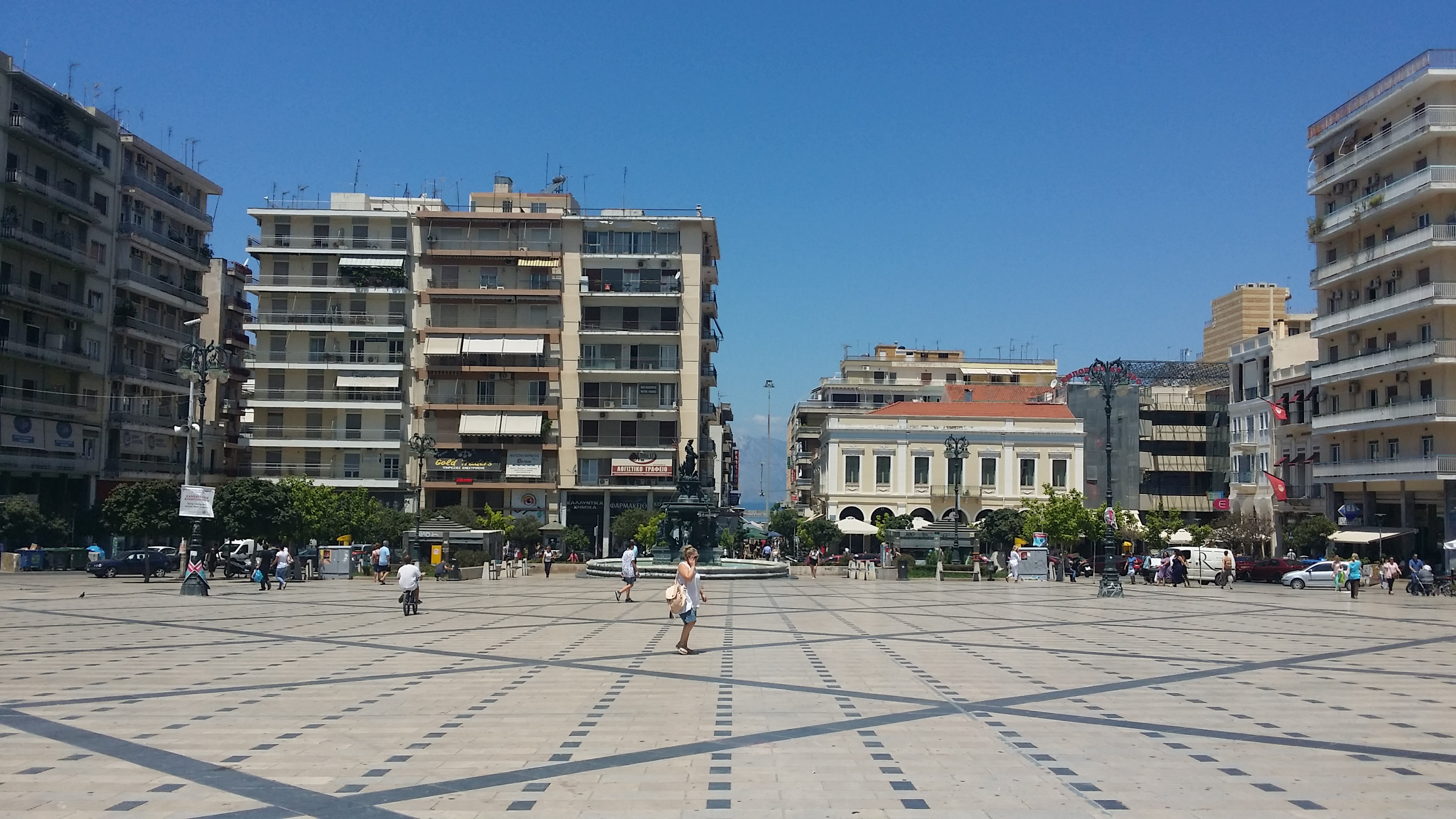
View

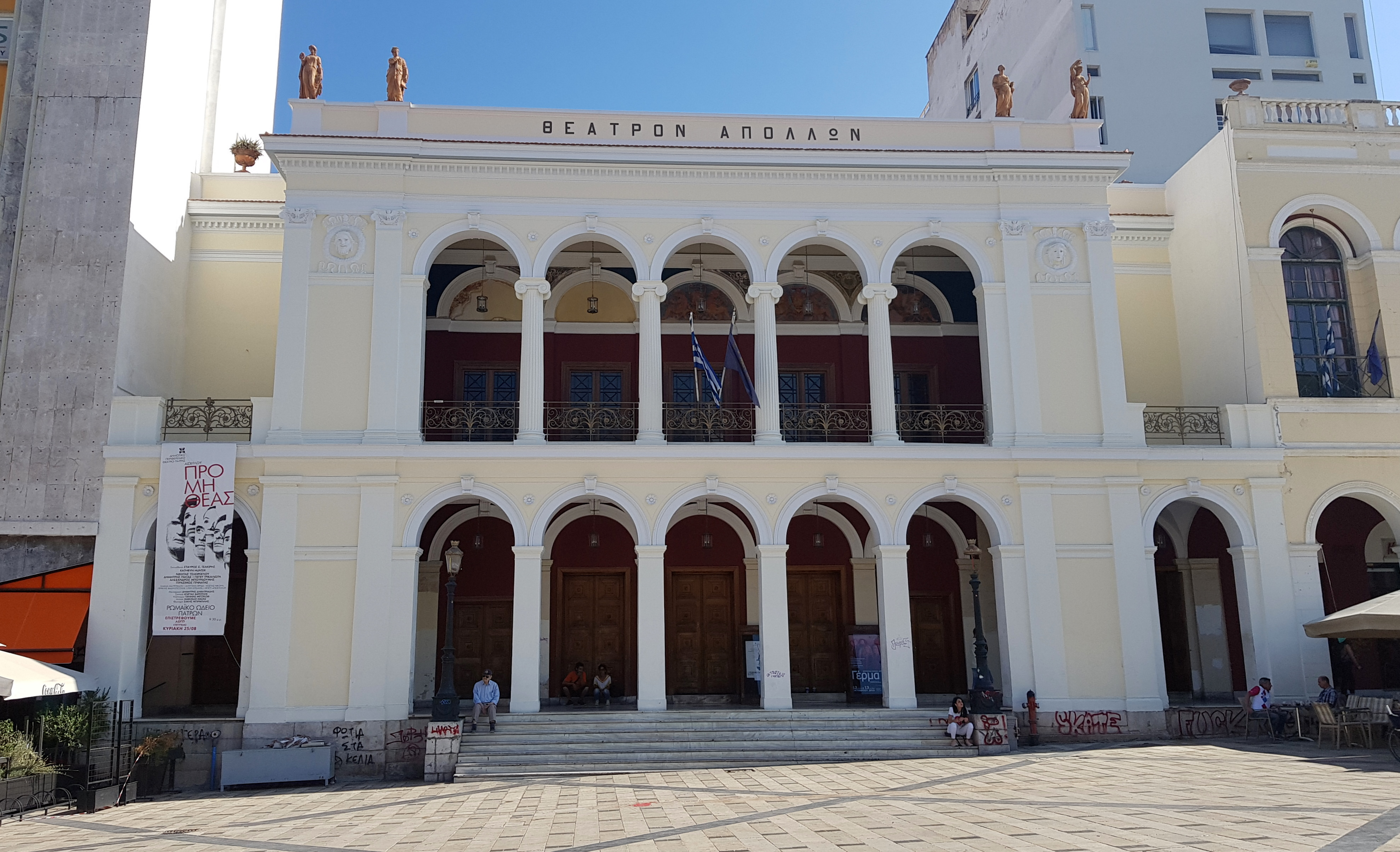
Apollon Theatre
