= Achaea =

Achaea Περιφερειακή ενότητα Αχαΐας
- Regional unit
- Municipalities of Achaea

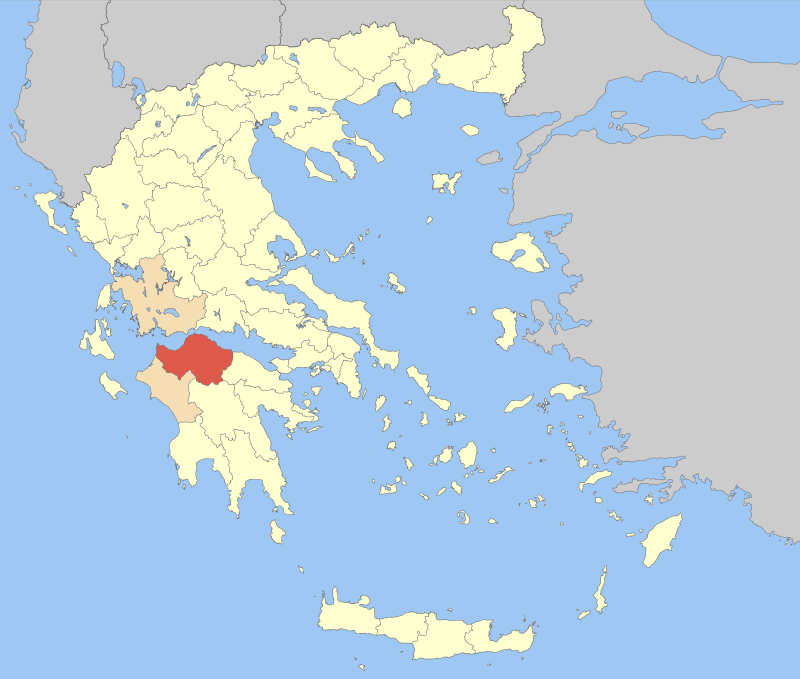
- Achaea within Greece

- Location within Greece
- Coordinates: 38°05′N 21°50′E
- Country: Greece
- Administrative region: Western Greece
- Seat: Patras

Area
  - Total: 3,272 km^{2} (1,263 sq mi)

Population (2021)
  - Total: 305,979
  - Density: 93.51/km^{2} (242.2/sq mi)
- Time zone: UTC+2 (EET)
  - Summer (DST): UTC+3 (EEST)
- Postal code: 25x xx, 26x xx
- Area code: 261, 269x
- Vehicle registration: ΑΖ, AX
- Website: www.achaia.gr

Achaea (/əˈkiːə/) or Achaia (/əˈkaɪə/), sometimes transliterated from Greek as Akhaia (Αχαΐα, Akhaḯa, Greek: [axaˈia]), is one of the regional units of Greece. It is part of the region of Western Greece and is situated in the northwestern part of the Peloponnese peninsula. The capital is Patras which is the third largest city in Greece.

== Geography ==
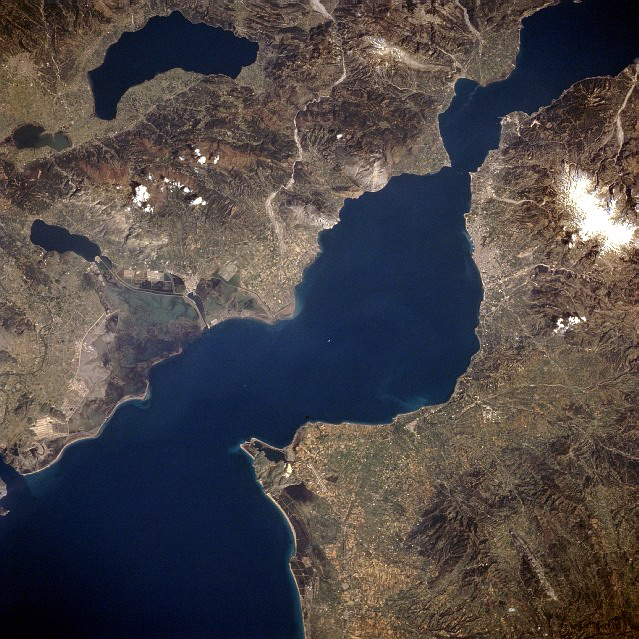
Gulf of Patras

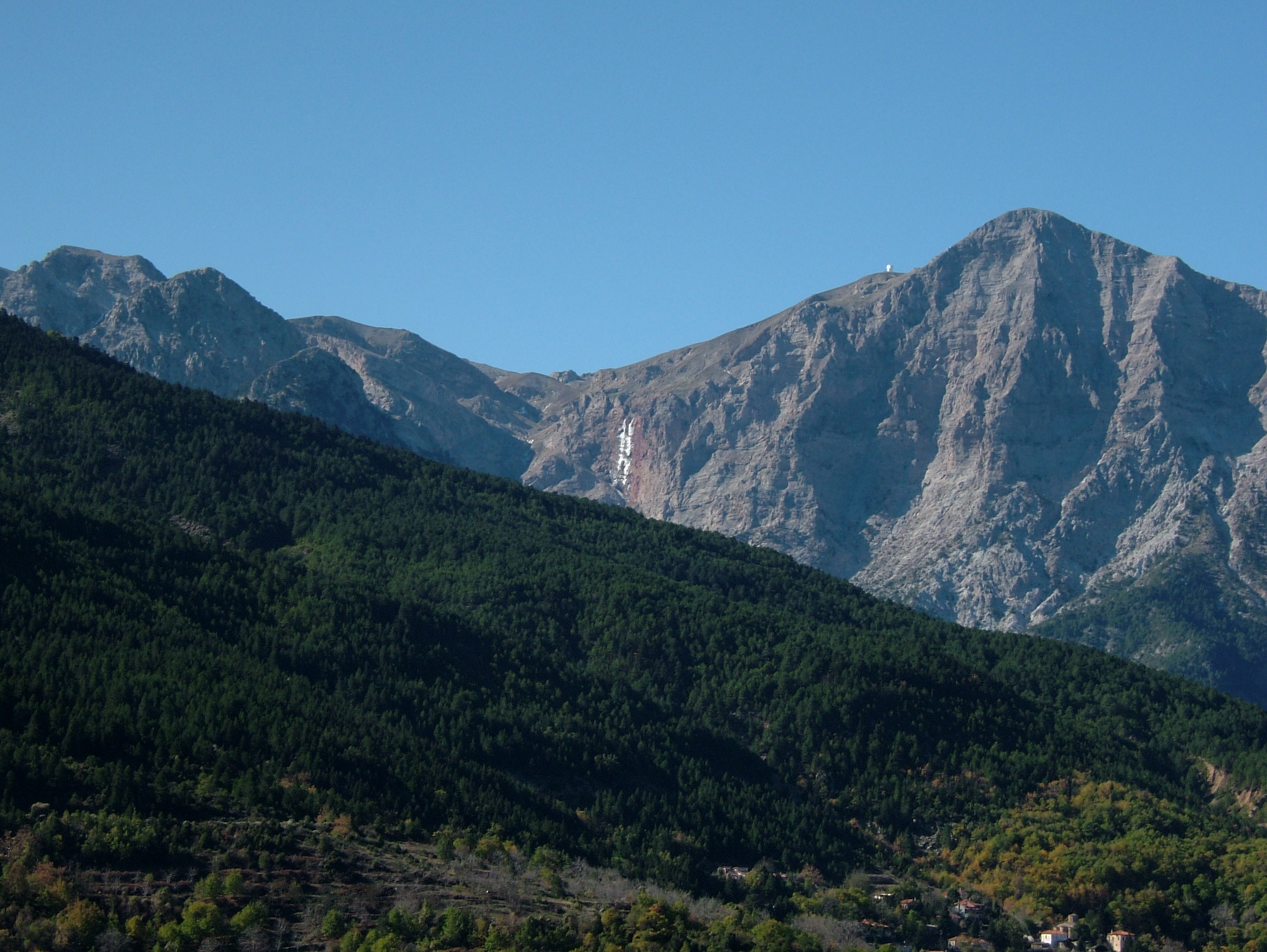
Mount Aroania or Chelmos.

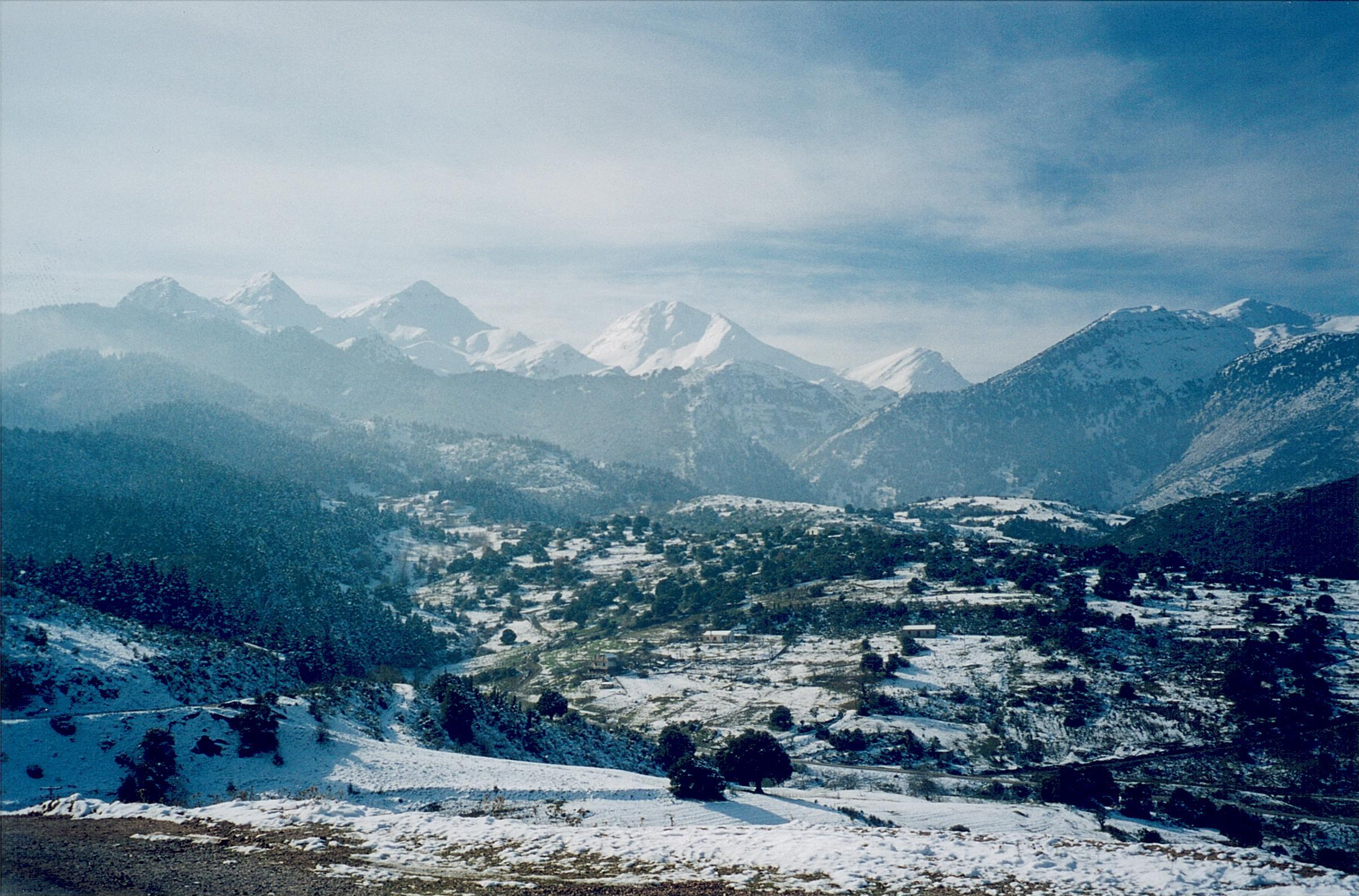
Mount Erymanthos

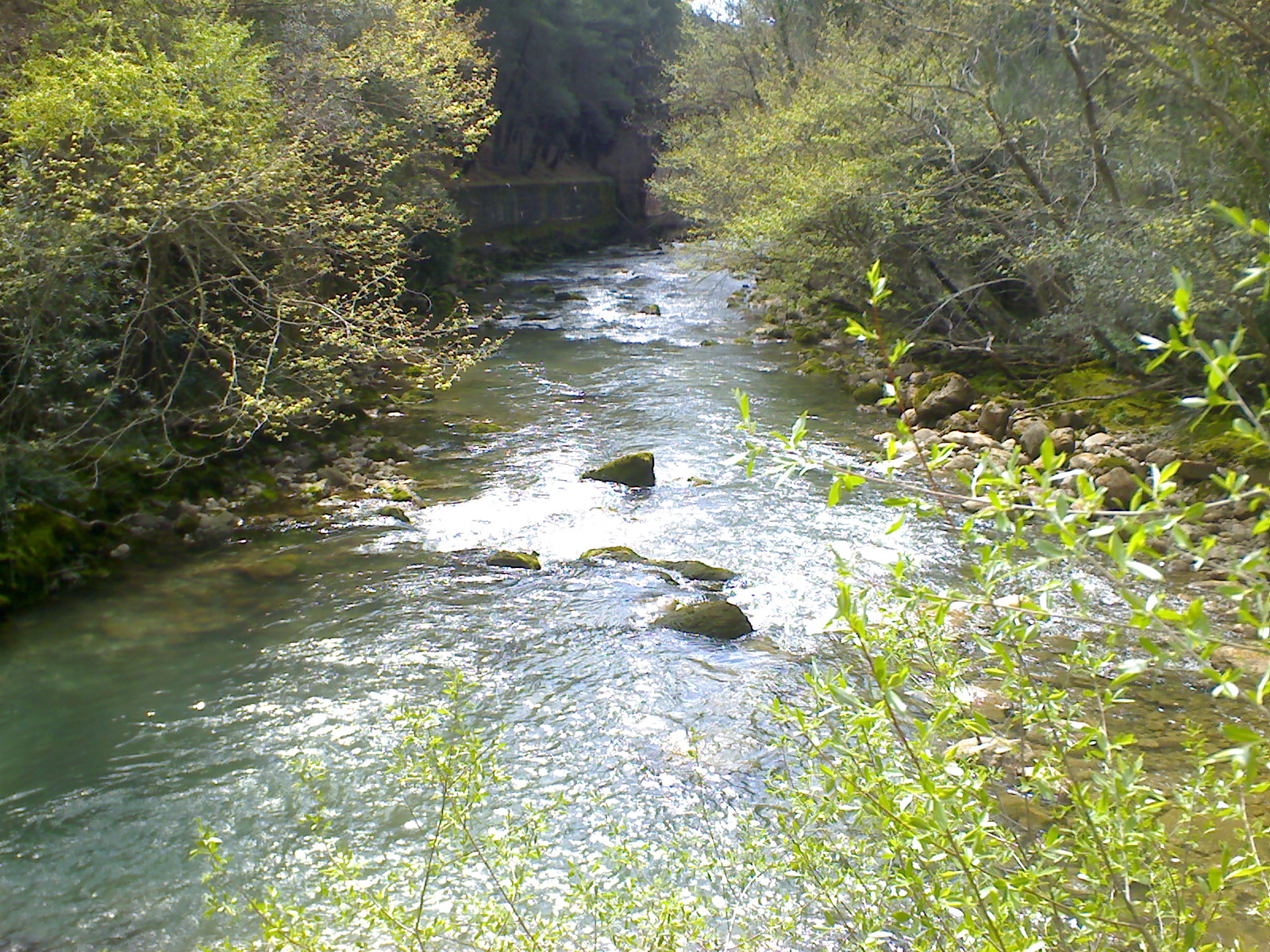
River Ladon

Achaea is bordered by Elis to the west and southwest, Arcadia to the south, and Corinthia to the east and southeast. The Gulf of Corinth lies to its northeast, and the Gulf of Patras to its northwest. The mountain Panachaiko (1926 m), though not the highest of Achaea, dominates the coastal area near Patras. Higher mountains are found in the south, such as Aroania (2341 m) and Erymanthos (2224 m). Other mountain ranges in Achaea are Skollis, Omplos, Kombovouni and Movri. Its main rivers ordered from west to east are the Larissos, Tytheus, Peiros, Charadros, Selinountas and Vouraikos. Most of the forests are in the mountain ranges, though several are in the plains including the extreme west. There are grasslands around the mid-elevation areas and barren lands in the highest areas.

== Climate ==
Achaea has hot summers and mild winters. Sunny days dominate during the summer months in areas near the coast, while the summer can be cloudy and rainy in the mountains. Snow is very common during the winter in the mountains of Erymanthos, Panachaiko and Aroania. Winter high temperatures are around the 10 °C mark throughout the low-lying areas.

== Administration ==
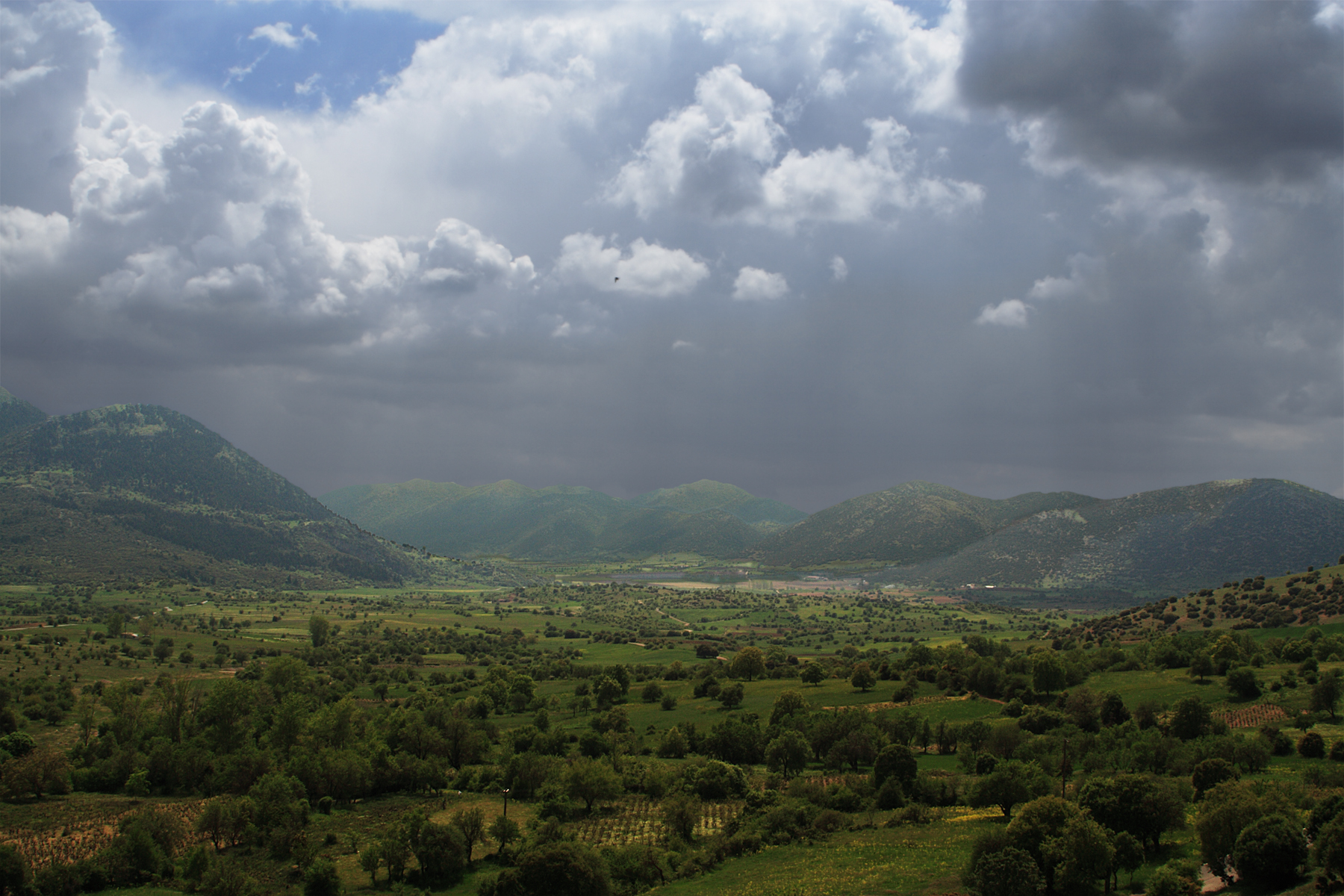
Karst depression (=Polje) near Kato Lousi village (Άνω_Λουσοί_Αχαΐας), north of Kastria

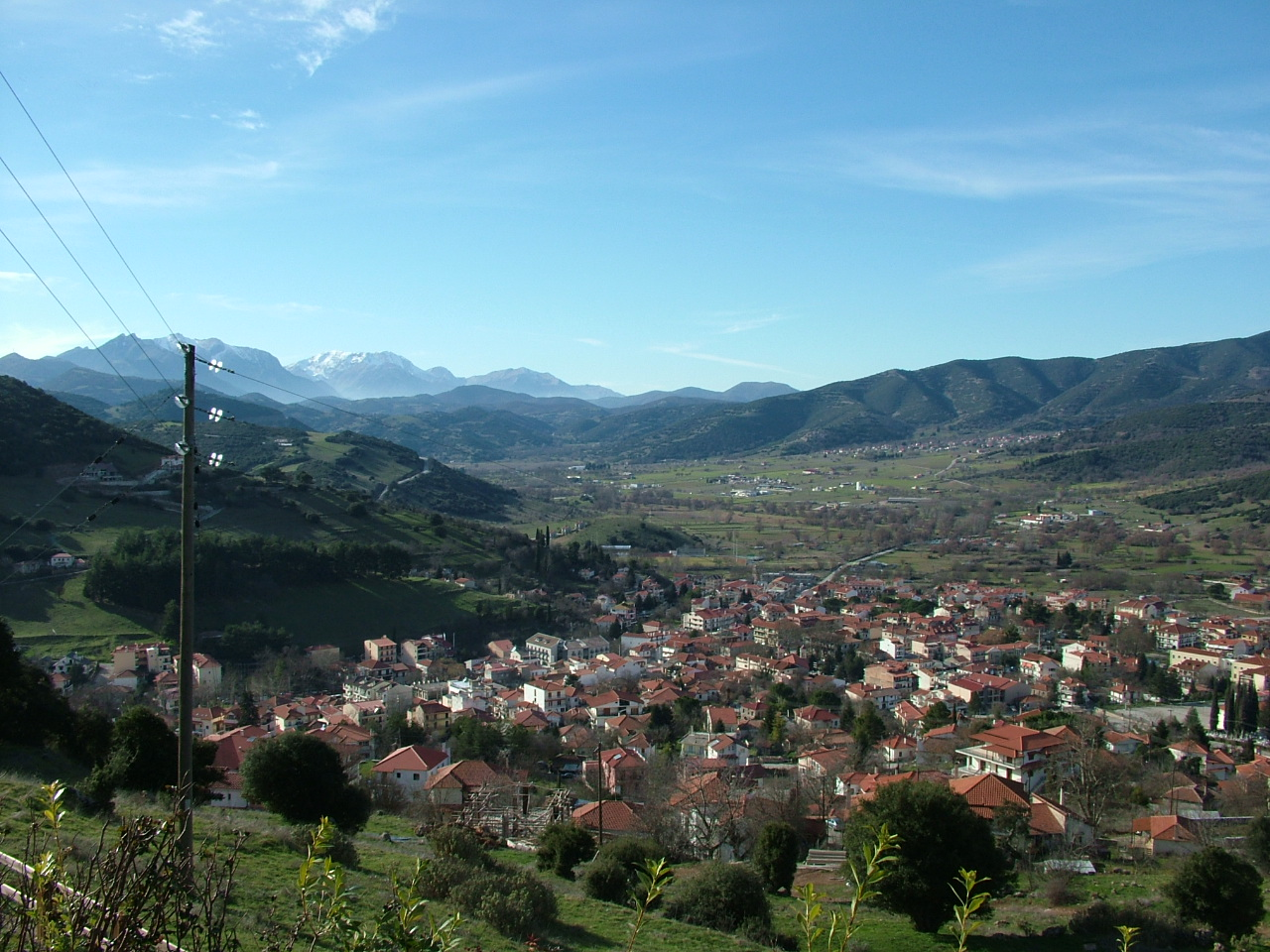
Kalavryta

The regional unit Achaea is subdivided into 5 municipalities. These are (number as in the map in the infobox):

- Aigialeia (2)
- Erymanthos (4)
- Kalavryta (5)
- Patras (Patra, 1)
- West Achaea (Dytiki Achaia, 3)

=== Prefecture ===
As a part of the 2011 Kallikratis government reform, the regional unit Achaea was created out of the former prefecture Achaea (Greek: Νομός Αχαΐας). The prefecture had the same territory as the present regional unit. At the same time, the municipalities were reorganised, according to the table below.

New municipality	Old municipalities	Seat
Aigialeia	Aigeira	Aigio
Aigialeia	Aigio	Aigio
Aigialeia	Akrata	Aigio
Aigialeia	Diakopto	Aigio
Aigialeia	Erineos	Aigio
Aigialeia	Sympoliteia	Aigio
Erymanthos	Farres	Chalandritsa
Erymanthos	Kalentzi	Chalandritsa
Erymanthos	Leontio	Chalandritsa
Erymanthos	Tritaia	Chalandritsa
Kalavryta	Kalavryta	Kalavryta
Kalavryta	Aroania	Kalavryta
Kalavryta	Kleitoria	Kalavryta
Kalavryta	Paia	Kalavryta
Patras (Patra)	Patras	Patras
Patras (Patra)	Vrachnaiika	Patras
Patras (Patra)	Messatida	Patras
Patras (Patra)	Paralia	Patras
Patras (Patra)	Rio	Patras
West Achaea (Dytiki Achaia)	Dymi	Kato Achaia
West Achaea (Dytiki Achaia)	Larissos	Kato Achaia
West Achaea (Dytiki Achaia)	Movri	Kato Achaia
West Achaea (Dytiki Achaia)	Olenia	Kato Achaia

=== Provinces ===
- Province of Aigialeia - Aigio
- Province of Kalavryta - Kalavryta
- Province of Patras - Patras

Note: Provinces no longer hold any legal status in Greece.

== History ==
=== Classical Antiquity ===
Map of ancient Peloponnese.

The Achaean League was a Hellenistic-era confederation of city states in Achaea, founded in 280/281 BC. It later grew until it included most of Peloponnese, much reducing the Macedonian rule in the area.

After Macedon's defeat by the Romans in the early 2nd century BC, the League was able finally to defeat a heavily weakened Sparta and take control of the entire Peloponnese. However, as the Roman influence in the area grew, the league erupted into an open revolt against Roman domination, in what is known as Achaean War. The Achaeans were defeated at the Battle of Corinth (146 BC), and the League was dissolved by the Romans.

In AD 51/52, Lucius Junius Gallio Annaeanus was proconsul of Achaea, and is portrayed (under the name "Gallio") in the book of the Acts of the Apostles, in the Bible, as presiding over the trial of the Apostle Paul in Corinth (Acts 18:12–17).

=== Medieval history ===
Byzantine Greece, ca. 900 AD

Map of Frankish Greece with the Principality of Achaea.

Achaea remained a province of the Byzantine Empire after the fall of the Western Roman Empire. In the 6th and 7th centuries, Slavs invaded Greece and reached the Peloponnese, settling there. The coastal cities remained largely under Byzantine control, and a Siege of Patras in 805/807 failed. By the end of the 9th century, the whole peninsula was firmly under Byzantine control again, forming the Theme of the Peloponnese.

After the Fourth Crusade several new Crusader states were founded in Greece. One of these was the Principality of Achaea, founded in 1205, which like the Roman province covered a much larger area than the Achaea region. The Achaea region was among the core territories of the Principality, with four baronies: the extensive Barony of Patras, the Barony of Vostitsa, the Barony of Chalandritsa, and the Barony of Kalavryta. Patras, under the powerful Latin Archbishopric of Patras, over time became a semi-autonomous domain under the protection of Venice and the Holy See. Although Kalavryta was lost to the Byzantine Greeks already by the end of the 13th century, the other baronies survived until the Principality of Achaea was conquered by the Byzantine Empire in 1430, and became part of the Despotate of the Morea.

The Despotate of the Morea fell to the Ottoman Empire in 1460. As a part of the Morean War, the Republic of Venice captured Achaea in 1687 and held it until 1715, when the Ottomans recaptured the Peloponnese. Under Ottoman rule, Achaea was part of the Morea Eyalet.

=== Modern history ===
In the Greek War of Independence, Aigio was one of the first cities to be liberated by the Greeks and all of Achaea was liberated by the end of 1821. Achaea produced several heroes including Kanaris, Zaimis and Roufos and prime ministers of Greece including Andreas Michalakopoulos as well as some head of states.

In the first administrative subdivision of independent Greece, Achaea was part of the Achaea and Elis Prefecture. This was divided into the prefectures of Achaea and Elis in 1899. Achaea and Elis were reunited in 1909, and split again in 1930.

Achaea saw an influx of refugees that arrived from Asia Minor during the Greco Turkish War of 1919–1922. Tens of thousands were relocated to their camps in the suburbs of Patras and a few villages mainly within the coastline. One of the camps was named Prosfygika.

== Population ==
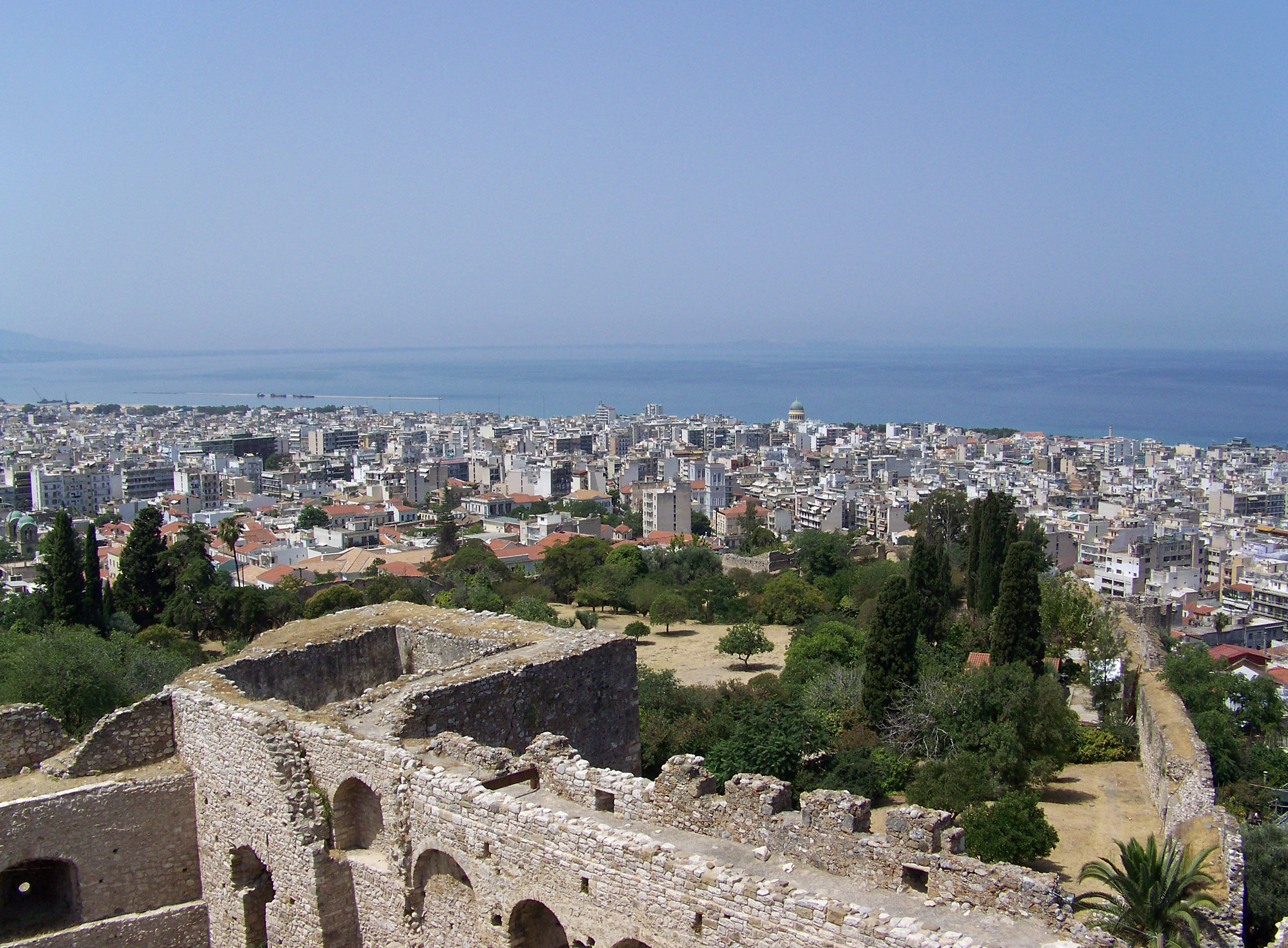
Patras

Achaea today has about one-third of the population of the Peloponnese. Patras, the capital of Achaea, is the third largest city in Greece, behind Athens and Thessaloniki. Two-thirds of the Achaean population live near Patras, and more than half within the city limits. The main industrial areas are around Patras.

=== Main towns and cities ===
The main cities and towns of Achaea are (ranked by 2021 census population of the town proper):

- Patras 169,886
- Aigio 19,857
- Kato Achaia 7,689

== Culture ==
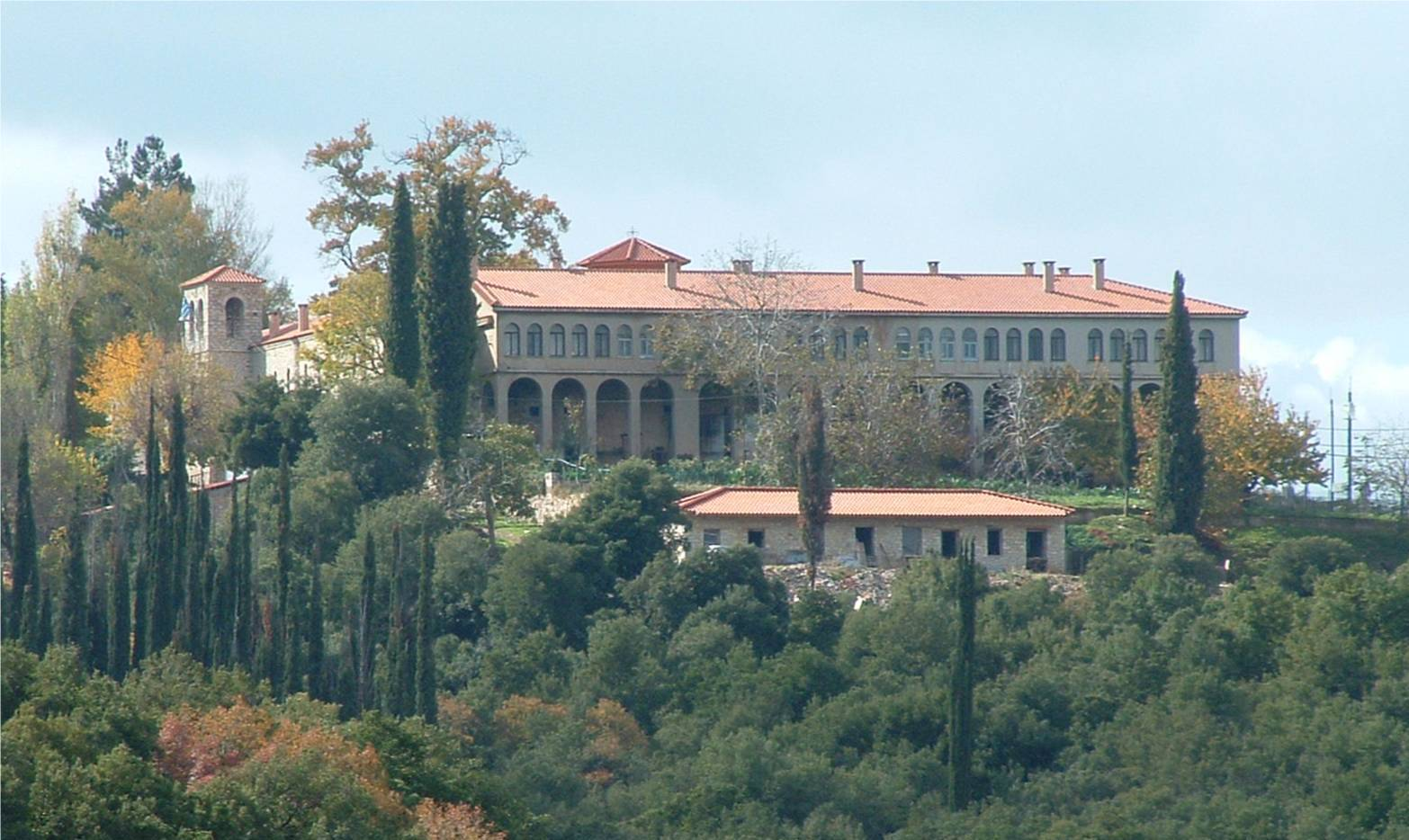
Agia Lavra monastery

The monastery Agia Lavra is situated a few kilometres west of Kalavryta on the top of a hill. 12 to 20 km east, is Cave Lakes, with lakes inside. The length is around 300 to 500 m.

The Elousa Monastery is located in the Panachaiko foothills.

The mountain hosts the most modern Greek telescope, named Aristarchus (after the ancient Greek astronomer - Aristarchus of Samos) and operated by the National Observatory of Athens. A narrow gauge railway track runs for 30 km, mainly as a tourist attraction. The track begins near Kalavryta and ends off Diakopto.

== Economy ==
Patras is one of the main industrial and commerce centers in Greece. Temeni is a place where the spring water Avra (Άυρα) is manufactured. It is owned by Tria Epsilon, a division of The Coca-Cola Company and a parent. There is a small oil refinery near Rio. Athenian brewery has the largest production facility of the company in Patra.

== Transport ==
=== Roads ===
There are two motorways in Achaea: the A5 motorway from Ioannina and Pyrgos; and the A8 motorway from Corinth and Athens. The motorways carry European routes E55 (towards Pyrgos) and E65 (towards Corinth).

There are also seven national roads in the regional unit: the EO5, from Rio to Ioannina via the Rio–Antirrio ferry; the EO8 and EO8a, from Patras to Athens; the EO9, from Patras to Pyrgos and Methoni; the EO31, from Aigio to Kalavryta; the EO33, from Patras to Vlacherna (near Levidi); and the EO64, from Kato Achaia to Araxos.

=== Bus ===
Intercity bus transport is provided by KTEL Achaias. The main bus terminal is in the city of Patras.

=== Rail ===
Achaea is served by both the Patras Suburban Railway on the Patras–Kyparissia line to Patras and Athens Suburban Railway on the Athens Airport–Patras line from Aigio to Athens. Both lines, as yet, do not meet.

== Communications ==
=== Newspapers, fanzines and others ===
==== Current newspapers ====
- Achagiotika Nea - Kato Achaia
- Allagi - Patras
- Elliniki Dimokratia - Patras
- Epi ta proso - Patras
- Evdomada - Patras
- Filodimos - Aigio
- Frouros tis Anatolikis Aigialeias - Akrata and eastern Aigaleia
- Ta Gegonota tis Achaias - Achaea
- I Gnomi - Patras
- Imera - Patras
- Imerisios Kyrix - Patras
- Kosmos tis Patras - Patras
- Paraliaki - Patras
- Patraiki Evdomada - Patras
- Politis ton Patron - Patras - political
- Proodos - Patras
- Proti tis Aigaleias - Aigio and Aigaleia
- Simerini - Patras
- Splats - a fanzine based in Patras
- Sport Week - Patras - sports
- Sportivo west - Patras - sports
- Styx - Akrata
- Symvoulos Epocheiriseon - Patras

==== Ceased and defunct newspapers ====
- Achaikos Kyrix - an older newspaper of Patras
- Tachydromos tis Anatolis - Patras, one of the few newspapers that were only published in French

=== Radio ===
- ERA Patras - Rio
- Super B - Patras
- Top FM - 93 FM
- Ionion FM - 95.8 FM
- Radio Gamma - 96 FM
- MFM
- Radio Aigio - 99.2 FM
- You FM - 100.1 FM (launched in 2006/2007)
- Mojo FM - 107.9 FM

=== Television ===
- Achaia Channel - Patrast
- Patra TV - Patras
- Super B - Patras
- Tele Con - extinct
- Tele Time - regional
- AXION - Aigio

== Companies ==
- Achaiki
- Kronos Supermarkets - Patras

== Sports ==
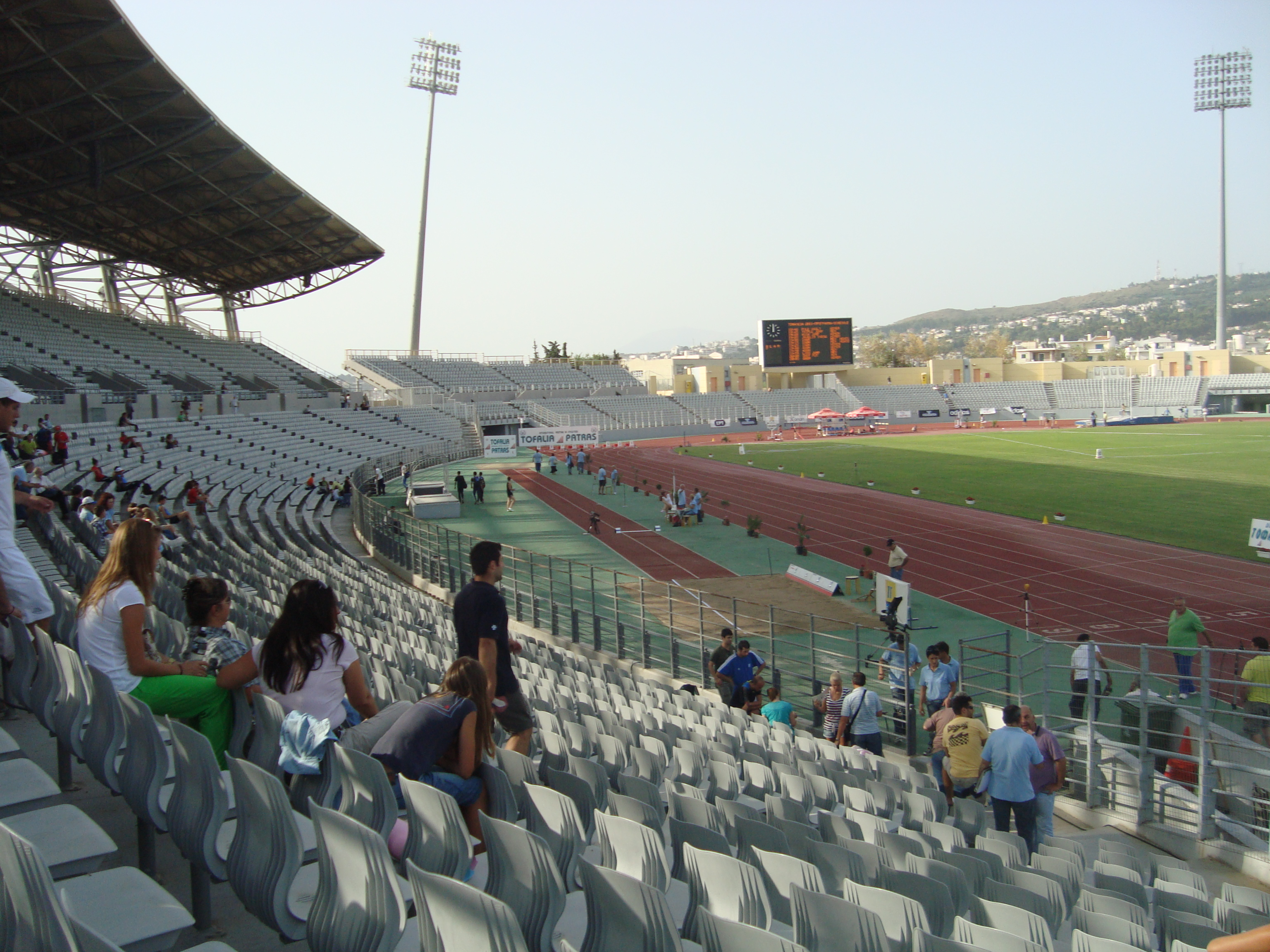
Pampeloponnisiako Stadium

There are two skiing resorts, one on the Panachaicus west of the mountain top (elevation around 1700 m) east of Patras, it will be Nafpaktos's closest because of the new bridge (mid-2004) and the other on Aroania, sometimes still called Chelmos, near Kalavrita. It is Kalavrita's closest resort.

=== Sporting teams ===
Division rankings were as of the 2005-06 season for most teams, for football (soccer), they are run by the Achaea Football Clubs Association:

Teams with multiple sporting clubs

- Panegialios F.C. - Aigio - second division
- Achaios Saravali Patras - Saravali - fourth division
- Anagennisi/Aias Sympoliteia - Rododafni
- Apollon Patras, A1 Basketleague
- Atromitos Patras - fourth division
- Diakopto AC - Diakopto - fourth division
- Fostiras Ovrias FC - Ovrya, fourth division
- Iraklis Patras - Patras, fourth division
- NO Patras - Patras, A2 League/Water polo
- NE Patras - Patras, A2 League/Water polo
- Olympiakos Aigio - Aigio, fourth division
- Olympiakos Kamares - Kamares - fourth division
- Olympiakos Patras - Patras - fourth division
- Ormi Patras - Patras, A1 League/ Women's Handball
- Panachaiki - Patras, third division
- E.A. Patras - Patras, third division/Volleyball
- Spartakos Ovrya - Ovrya - third division (as of 2007)
- Thyella Patras F.C. - Patras, third division
- A.P.S. Zavlani - fourth division

Basketball only

- Promitheas Patras B.C.
- A.O. Skagiopouleio

Defunct and historic teams

- Lefkos Asteras - Patras
- Thriamvos Patras - Patras, now part of NE Patras

== Notable people ==
- Actor, mythological legend
- Alexon, ancient figure
- Timoleon Ambelas, a writer
- Dimitrios Andrikopoulos-Boukaouris, Mayor of Patras
- Antheia, mythological legend
- Autonous, ancient figure
- Bolina, ancient figure
- Bryson of Achaea, ancient figure
- Anastasios Charalambis General and Prime Minister for one day in 1922.
- Vasileios Christopoulos, an artist
- Danielis, ancient figure
- Kostas Davourlis Footballer of Panachaiki
- Theodoros Deligiannis a Prime Minister of Greece
- Ioannis Diakidis
- Rena Dor, actress
- Eperatus, ancient figure
- Spyros Fokas, an actor
- Asimakis Fotilas, a revolutionary leader
- Panagiotakis Fotilas, a revolutionary leader
- Giorgos Giannias, a revolutionary leader
- Dimitrios Gounaris a Prime Minister of Greece
- Helike, ancient queen
- Ion, mythological legend
- Antonios Kalamogdartis, a revolutionary leader
- Athanasios Kanakaris-Roufos, a revolutionary leader
- Panagiotis Karatzas, a revolutionary leader
- Kostas Katsouranis Footballer - European Champion (Euro 2004)
- Konstantinos Konstantopoulos a Mayor of Patras and Prime Minister of Greece
- Andreas Kontogouris, a revolutionary leader
- Nikolaos Kontopoulos
- Christos Laskaris
- Afroditi Laoutari, an actress
- Dimitrios Maximos
- Vassilis Makris, an artist
- Memos Makris, an artist
- Dimitrios Maximos a Prime Minister of Greece
- Andreas Michalakopoulos a Prime Minister of Greece
- Andreas Mikroutsikos
- Betty Moschona, an actress
- Molurus, ancient figure
- Thanos Mikroutsikos, composer, former Minister of Culture
- Myscellus
- Kostis Palamas national Greek poet
- George Papandreou (senior) a Prime Minister of Greece
- Georgios Papadopoulos Leader of the military junta
- Georgios Papandreou (historian), an unrelated historian and linguist
- Anagnostis Petimezas, a revolutionary leader
- Konstantinos Petimezas, a revolutionary leader
- Konstantis Petimezas, a revolutionary leader
- Nikolaos Petimezas (elder)
- Angelos Roufos
- Benizelos Roufos a Prime Minister of Greece
- Ioannis Roufos
- Panagiotis Skagiopoulos
- Sokratis Skartsis, poet
- Konstantinos Skourletis, mayor of Patras
- Markos Sklivaniotis
- Socrates of Achaea, ancient figure
- Sostratus of Dyme, an ancient figure
- Sostratus of Pellene, an ancient Greek Olympian
- Konstantinos Stefanopoulos President of Greece
- Epameinondas Thomopoulos, an artist
- Dimitrios Tofalos Olympic Champion
- Spyridon Vassiliadis, poet
- Xenofon Verykios
- Dimitrios Votsis, mayor of Patras
- Spyros Vrettos, poet
- Alexandros Zaimis a Prime Minister and President of Greece

== See also ==
- Achaea (constituency)
