= Sport Week =

- Type: Weekly
- Format: N/A
- Owner(s): N/A
- Founded: 1999; 26 years ago
- Headquarters: Patras, Greece

Sport Week was a weekly sports newspaper based in Patras in the Achaea prefecture in Greece. It was first published in 1999 from S Media Group S.A.. It had many pages and these pages features news from all the athletic information from Achaea, Etoloakarnania, Ilia, Kefalonia and Zakynthos.

== See also ==
- List of newspapers in Greece
