= Christopoulos =

Christopoulos (Greek: Χριστόπουλος) is a Greek surname. Notable people with the surname include:

- Anastasios Christopoulos (1805–1854), Greek revolutionary leader
- Apostolos Christopoulos (born 2003), Greek footballer
- Athanasios Christopoulos (1772–1847), Greek poet
- Dimitrios Christopoulos, Greek athlete
- George Christopoulos (born 1960), Australian association football player
- Giannis Christopoulos (born 1972), Greek association football coach
- Spyros Christopoulos (born 1975), Greek footballer
- Stephanos Christopoulos (born 1876), Greek wrestler
- Vasileios Christopoulos (born 1951), Greek writer
- Yannis Christopoulos (born 1974), Greek basketball coach
