= Timoleon (disambiguation) =

Timoleon (c. 411–337 BC) was a Greek statesman and general.

Timoleon can also refer to:

== People ==
- David Gordon (Australian politician) (1865–1946), Australian politician writing under the pseudonym "Timoleon"
- Timoleon (given name), masculine given name and middle name
- Timoléon, masculine given name and surname
- Timoleón Jiménez (born 1959), Colombian guerrilla warrior

== Other uses ==
- French ship Timoléon, Téméraire-class ship launched 1785
- Timoleon (horse), American Thoroughbred horse
- Timoleon (play), 1730 tragedy by Benjamin Martyn
- Timoleon (poems), 1891 collection of poems by Herman Melville

== See also ==
- François-Timoléon de Choisy (1644–1724), French abbé and writer
- Iraota timoleon, species of blue butterfly found in Asia
- Timoleon Vieta Come Home, 2003 novel by Dan Rhodes
