= Georgios Papandreou (historian) =

Greek historian (1859–1940)

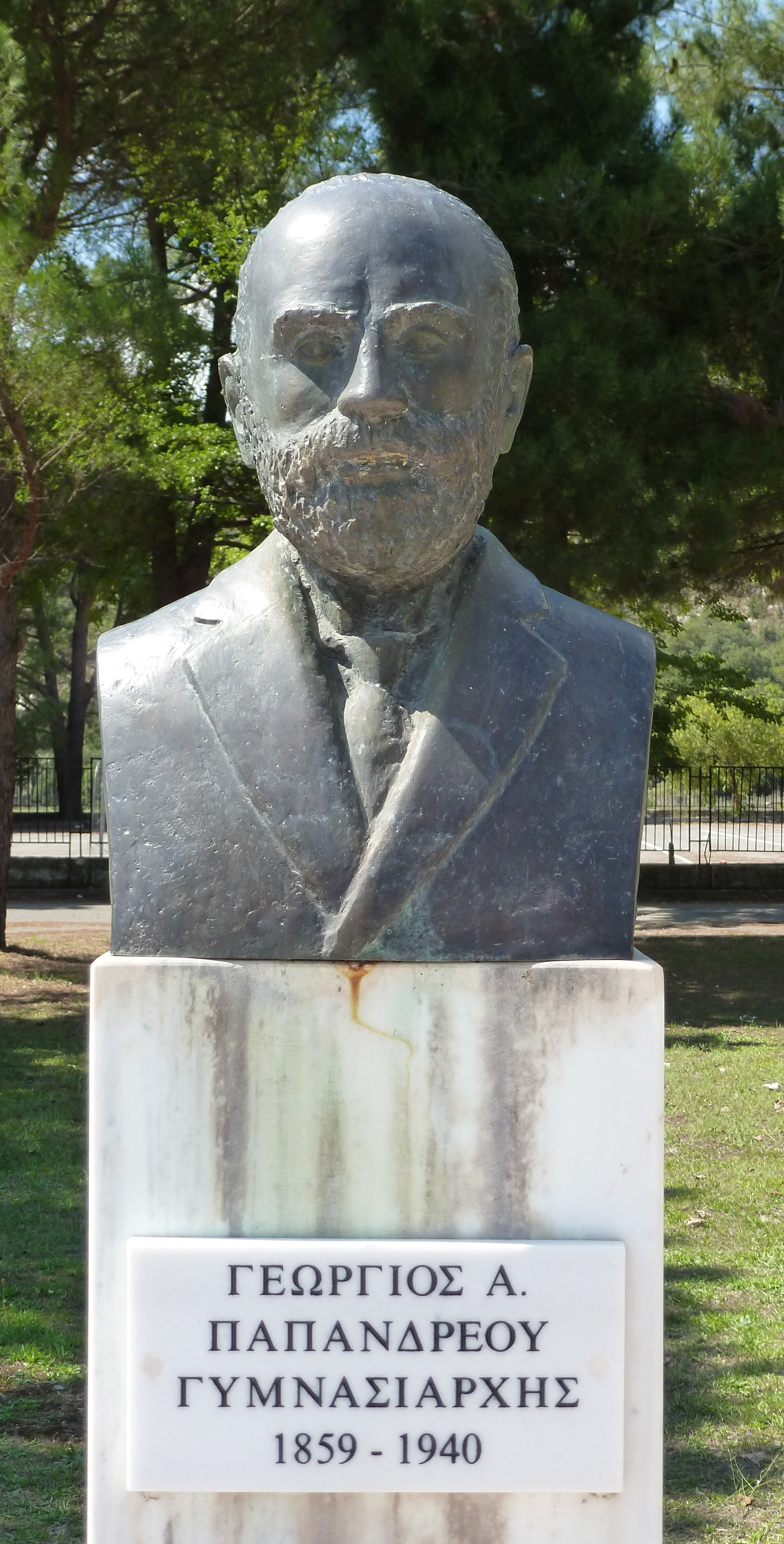
- Bust of Georgios A. Panandreou, located in the square of the new village of Paos, Achaia
- Born: 1859; Skoupi, Kalavryta, Achaia, Greece
- Died: 26 July 1940 (aged 80–81); Athens, Greece
- Occupations: Historian, linguist, author

Georgios Papandreou (Greek: Γεώργιος Παπανδρέου; 1859–1940) was a Greek historian, linguist and an author.

== Bibliography ==
Georgios Papandreou (born 1859) was a Greek educator and historian, born in Kalavryta. He was a literary figure based on Ilia, as he had been the first person to write about Ilia's history. In his books he always signed as Georgios Papandreou D.F.

Papandreou was born in the village of Skoupi (now part of the municipality of Kalavryta) in Achaia, and spent his childhood years in Pyrgos, where he later received education. Eventually, he moved to Athens where he studied philosophy and taught at schools, such as the middle school of Chalkida, as well as the middle school of Kalavryta. Furthermore, he acquired the position of headmaster at the 1st Middle School in Pyrgos for many years. In 1886, he became a PhD of the Athens Philosophical School with likeness in his member Away, In Ancient Psophis (περι της αρχαίας Ψωφίδος). In 1896, he was proclaimed of linguists with the diatribe Away in The Elean Dialect (περί της των Ηλείων διαλέκτου). In 1901, he published some of his articles in the newspaper "Peloponnisos". In 1924, he wrote the book Elis In The Middle Of The Century (Η Ηλεία δια μέσου των αιώνων = I Ilia dia messou ton eonon). He died on July 26, 1940, in Marousi, northeast of the Greek capital of Athens.
