= Tele Time =

TeleTime
- Country: Greece
- Broadcast area: Peloponnese, southern Central Greece, Aetolia, Kythira, Phocis, in Corinthian gulf, in islands of Argosaronic, in southern Ionian islands, Boeotia and in western Attica

Programming
- Language: Greek
- Picture format: 576i (SDTV)

Ownership
- Owner: TeleTime S.A.

History
- Founded: 23 April 1992
- Launched: 1992
- Closed: 2013

TeleTime is a Greek local television station serving Western Greece. It includes the prefectures of Achaia, Aetolia-Acarnania, Elis, Cephalonia, Lefkada and Zakynthos. Its headquarters are in Patras. It offers movies as well as local programs and programs from Greece, as well as children's programs and animated series from Nickelodeon.

== History ==
It had broadcast programs from Seven X as it was its affiliate, in the early 2000s, much of the schedule was replaced when it no longer broadcast satellite channels and began broadcasting music videos in the morning, around 2005 to 2006, the morning show was introduced in the Peloponnese and Western Greece. The ownership once belonged to the journalist Giorgos Tragkas. In 2008, the station was bought by Patrinos Theodoros Kamberos, head of Kamberos, owner of the paper I Imera and the radio station Radio Gamma. The channel features and feature Anastassopoulos, Karvouniaris, Efthymiou, Bairaktaris, etc. TeleTime also has a company with its channel that of Channel 10 (now Alert TV) in the Attica prefecture.

== Logo and slogan ==
Its logo was formerly with two Ts and striped, the name of the station later appeared at the bottom in 1995 and changed text several times. It lost its logo and its current logo is with a triangle facing upside down coloured lavender-pink and Tele Time in two lines to the right. Its historic slogans have been The Power of Television (I Dynami (or Dinami) tis Tileorasis).

== Closure ==
In early 2014, the NCRTV decided to delist Teletime as it had stopped broadcasting since the previous year (2013) due to financial problems.

== See also ==
- List of Greek-language television channels
- List of companies of Greece
