= Super B =

Super B may refer to:

- Super B (TV channel), first television in West Greece
- Super B (film), 2002 Philippine film
