= Kontogouris =

Kontogouris (Greek: Κοντογούρης) is a Greek surname. Notable people with the surname include:

- Andreas Kontogouris (died 1824), Greek diplomat and a revolutionary leader
- Aristomenis Kontogouris (1841–1904), former mayor of Patras
- Nikolaos Kontogouris (1878–1913), Greek politician and army officer
