= Achaikos Kiryx =

19th century Greek newspaper

Achaikos Kiryx Αχαϊκός Κήρυξ
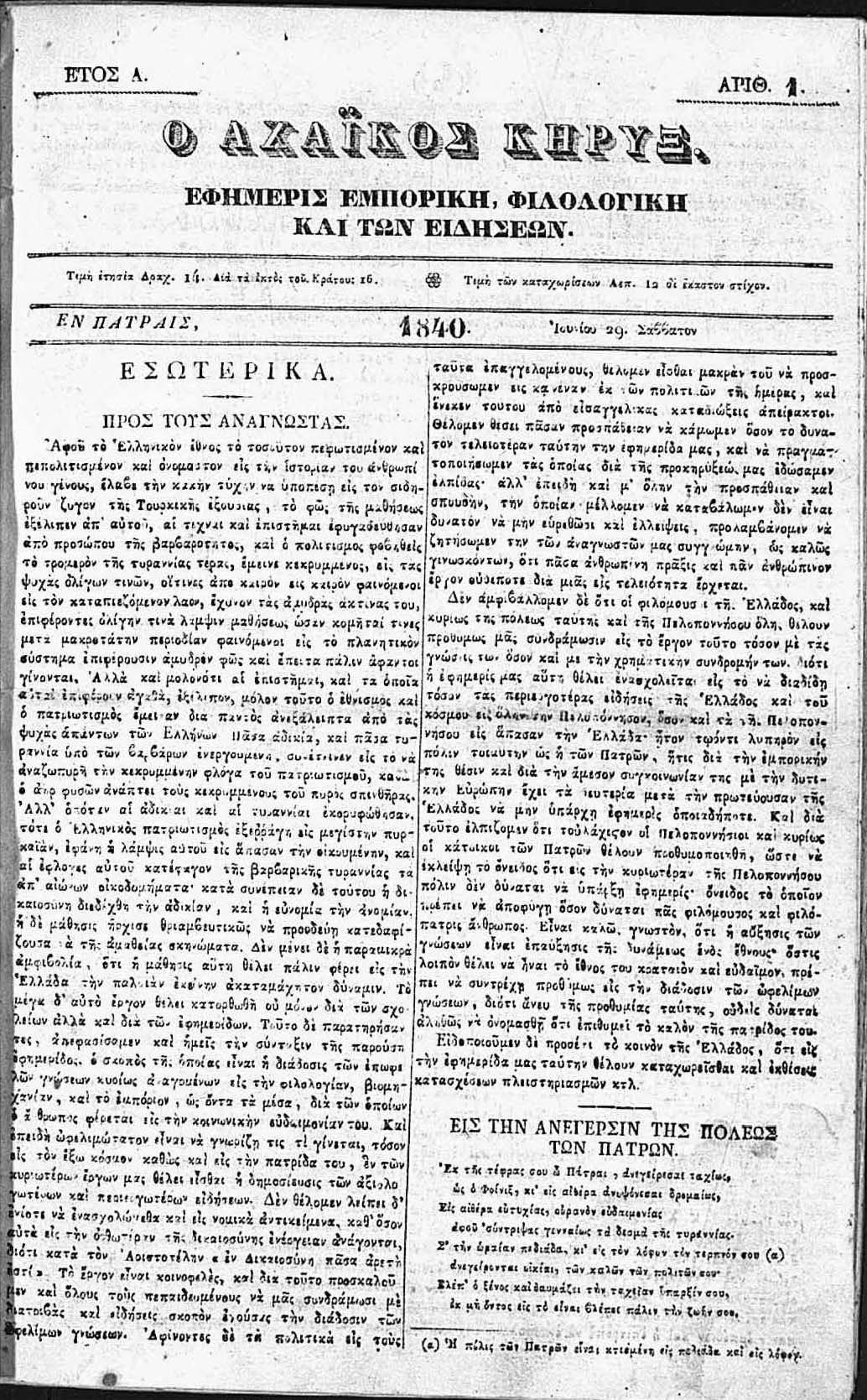
- Frontpage of issue number 1, June 29, 1840
- Type: Weekly
- Editor: Nikolaos Maniakis
- Founded: June 29, 1840
- Ceased publication: June 17, 1841
- Headquarters: Patras, Greece

Achaikos Kiryx (Greek: Ο Αχαϊκός Κήρυξ, Achaean Herald) was a newspaper that was founded on June 29, 1840, in Patras, Greece, by Nikolaos Maniakis. It was the first Greek language newspaper published in Patras, preceded only by the Le Courrier d'Orient, published in French in 1828. The newspaper's last issue was published on June 17, 1841.

== See also ==
- List of newspapers in Greece
