= University of Patras Poetry Symposium =

The Poetry Symposium (Greek: Symposio Poiisis or Simbosio Piisis) is held every year during the beginning of July. It was first held in 1981 by the shield of the University of Patras. Every year, the sayings of the Poetry Symposium are different.

Hundreds of journalists had presented in literary works, critics and poems which journalizes the Act Of The Poetry Symposium which is achieved every year.

The Poetry Symposium are Administrated by the Organized Committee. In 2007, its members of the Organized Committee are:

- Stavros Koumpias
- Sokratis Skartsis, poet
- Lydia Stefanou, poet, translator
- Alexis Lykourgiotis, professor of the University of Patras
- Xenofon Verykios, poet, professor of the University of patas
- Dimitris Katsaganis, poet, critic
- Kostas Kremmydas, poet, editor of the periodical Mandragoras (Μανδραγόρας)?
- Dimitris Charitos, poet, cinematographer critic
- Sotiris Varnavas, poet, professor of the University of Patras
- Kostas Kapelas, Journalist Of The Polyedro Bookstore
- Giorgos Kentrotis, poet, translator, professor of the Ionian University
- Savvas Mihail, critic
- Thanasis Nakas, professor of the University of Patras
- Xeni Skartsi, poet
- Honorary Members are:
  - Michais G. Meraklis, critic, former professor of the University of Athens
  - Andreas Belezinis, philologist, critic

== Historic Registered Symposia And Topics ==
- July 3–5, 1981 - I Symposium: The First Postwar Generation. The Poetry In Life And In - Poetry And Technology. Theory And Language Of Poetry
- July 2–4, 1982 - II Symposium: Critics And Poems
- July 1–7, 1983 - III Symposium: Dedication to Constantine Cavafy
- July 6–8, 1984 - IV Symposium: Dedication to Folk Music
- July 5–7, 1985 - V Symposium: Commons And Poetry
- July 4–6, 1986 - VI Symposium: Modern Greek Postwar Poetry (1945-1985)
- July 3–5, 1987 - VII Symposium: Poetry For Children
- July 1–3, 1988 - VIII Symposium: Poetry And Prose Writing
- July 7–9, 1989 - IX Symposium: Kostis Palamas: His Timeline And Our Timeline
- July 6–8, 1990 - X Symposium: Dionysios Solomos
- July 5–7, 1991 - XI Smposium: Poetic Anthologies
- July 3–5, 1992 - XII Symposium: Andreas Kalvos
- July 2–4, 1993 - XIII Symposium: Nationality And Poetry
- July 1–3, 1994 - XIV Symposium: Andreas Empeirikos, Yiannis Ritsos, Periodicals
- July 7–9. 1995 - XV Symposium: Poetry And Music
- July 5–7, 1996 - XVI Symposium: Angelos Sikelianos
- July 4–6, 1997 - XVII Symposium: Ancient Greek Poem And The Time
- July 3–5, 1998 - XVIII Symposium: Poetry And Language
- July 2–4, 1999 - XIX Symposium: The Stream And Synchronized Poetry
- July 7–9, 2000 - XX Symposium: The Poetry In Our Lives
- July 6–8, 2001 - XXI Symposium: Our Lost Poets
- July 5–7, 2002 - XXII Symposium: These Poems We Love
- July 4–6, 2003 - XXIII Symposium: The Translations Of Poetry
- July 2–4, 2004 - XXIV Symposium: The Poetry Of Anthem
- July 1–3, 2005 - XXV Symposium: 25 Years Of Symposium - 25 Years Of Poetry.
- June 29 - July 2, 2006 - XXVI Symposiym: Poetry And Romance. (In organized committee of 2006, it was presented by Christos Chatzitheodorou, Deanship of the University of Patras)
- 2007 - XXVII Symposium: Why Poetry
