= I Imera =

I Imera Η Ημέρα
- Type: Weekly
- Format: N/A
- Owner: N/A
- Founded: N/A
- Headquarters: Patras, Greece

I Imera (Greek: Η Ημέρα, English: The Day) was a newspaper that was based in Patras in the Achaea regional unit in Greece. Its editor-in-chief was Theodoros Kamperos.

== See also ==
- List of newspapers in Greece
