= Athens Radio Station =

The Athens Radio Station (Greek: Ραδιοφωνικός Σταθμός Αθηνών) was a radio station that began broadcasting in Athens in 1938 operated by the Metaxas Regime's Radio Broadcast Service (ΥΡΕ) (Υπηρεσία Ραδιοφωνικής Εκπομπής, ΥΡΕ). It was housed in the Zappeion building in central Athens in central Athens. It was the forerunner of the eventual National Radio Foundation.
