= Achagiotika Nea =

- Type: Weekly
- Format: N/A
- Owner(s): N/A
- Founded: 1990
- Headquarters: Kato Achaia, Greece

Achagiotika Nea (Greek: Αχαγιώτικα Νέα, meaning Kato Achagia News) was a newspaper that covered its top stories in Kato Achaia and the northwestern Achaia prefecture. It was first published in January 1990 and ceased operations in October 2020.

== Information ==
Achagiotika Nea features sports, weather, businesses and entertainment. It features pages about news stories.

== See also ==
- List of newspapers in Greece
