= Jean-François-Maxime Raybaud =

French philhellene officer and writer

- Born: 19 June 1795; La Colle-sur-Loup, Alpes-Maritimes, France
- Died: 1 January 1894 (aged 98); La Colle-sur-Loup, Alpes-Maritimes, France
- Occupations: Military officer, philhellene, writer, diplomat
- Known for: Philhellene officer during the Greek War of Independence
- Awards: Knight (1837) of the Legion of Honour (France) Officer (1849) of the Legion of Honour (France); Commander (1852) of the Legion of Honour (France); Officer (1836) of the Order of the Redeemer (Greece); Commander of the Order of Charles III (Spain); Knight (1847) of the Order of the Southern Cross (Brazil) Knight (1852) of the Order of Pope Pius IX (Vatican)

Jean-François-Maxime Raybaud (19 June 1795 La Colle-sur-Loup, – 1 January 1894 La Colle-sur-Loup, Alpes-Maritimes) was a French philhellene officer and writer, and a participant in the War of Independence of Greece.

== Life ==
=== Youth ===
Born at the Château du Canadel in La Colle-sur-Loup, he moved as a child to La Flèche when his father, Louis-Maxime Raybaud, became the Head of the Military School (Prytanée National Militaire). At the time of his arrival in Greece in 1821, he is mentioned by the Greek historian A.Vakalopulos as former officer of Napoleon. However, Raybaud himself, on the first pages of his Greek memoirs published in 1824, mention that he "entered the service in 1813," and "left the army because of reduction in December 1820." This gives a basis to modern British historian William St. Clair to consider his participation in Greek War of Independence as the search for a new career.

=== Greek War of Independence ===
In July 1821, after meeting in Marseille with Alexander Mavrokordato, Raybaud sail with him on the brig of the owner from the island of Hydra to insurgent Greece. With them on the ship were 70 volunteers from the Greek diaspora, four French and three Italian volunteers. On 2 August 1821 the ship was anchored in the lagoon of the city of Messolonghi Raybaud participated in the Siege of Tripolitsa in the Peloponnese and witnessed its fall in October 1821

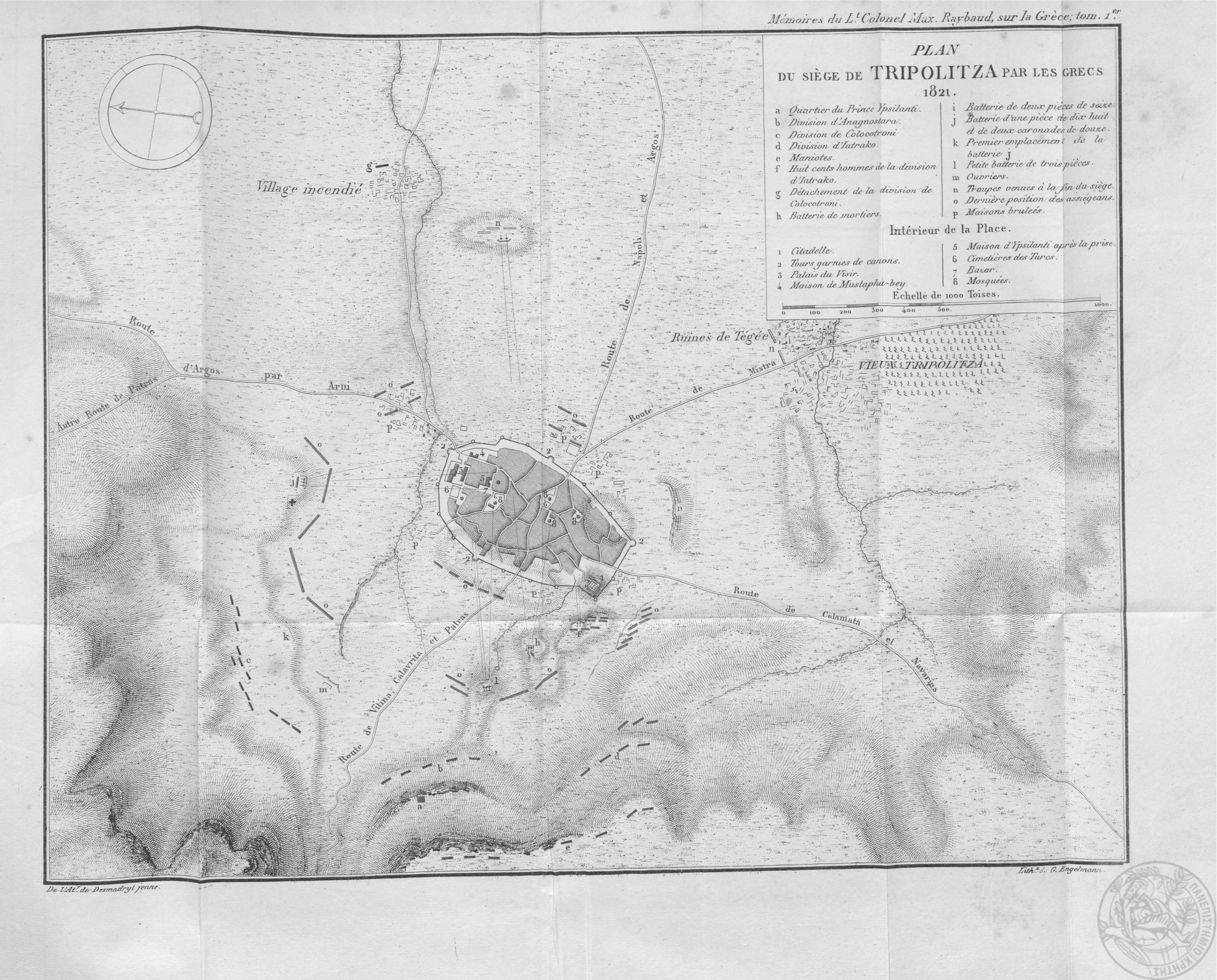
Plan du siège dans sa dernière phase, tiré de l'ouvrage du philhellène Raybaud, qui assista aux combats.

The contemporary English writer Douglas Dakin claims that by this time Raybaud already "assist" the Greek insurgents in Macedonia. In the Battle of Peta, where the first regular regiment (actually battalion) of the Greek army, which consisted of Greeks of diaspora and foreign volunteers, lost half of its members, Raybaud served at the headquarters of Mavrokordato. In July 1822 in the city of Messolonghi Raybaud headed 25 survivors of Peta Philhellenes during ceremonial volley in a memory of their fallen comrades.

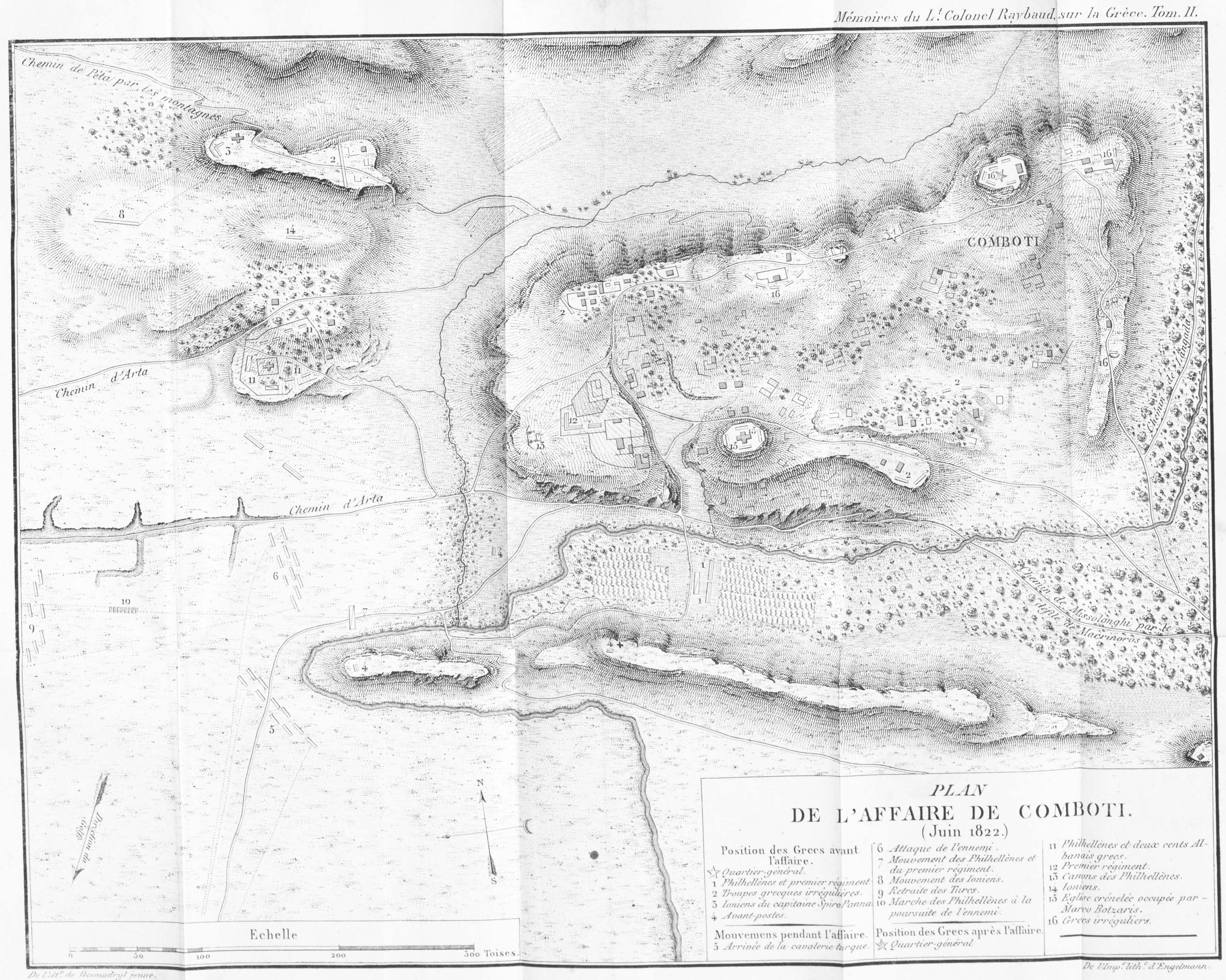
Plan of the action of Comboti, from the book of Raybaud

Raybaud returned to France, where in 1824 he published his Greek memoirs accompanied by topographical plans («Mémoires sur la Grèce pour servir à l'histoire de la guerre de l'Indépendance, accompagnés de plans topographiques» – Paris 1824). Greek historians consider Raybaud as the most reliable of all French memoirists and historians of the first years of the Greek Revolution. At the same time, in his memoirs Raybaud exposes fictions, mocks and condemns another French Philhellene, Olivier Voutier, who published his «Memoires sur la guerre actuelle des Grecs» the year before (Paris, 1823). In September 1825 Raybaud returned to Greece, leading the first group of volunteers sent by the French Philhellene Committee. Then Raybaud returned to France and was led again one of the two new teams of volunteers sent by the French Committee in 1826. In November 1826, led by 70 regular soldiers Raybaud took part in a failed raid on the island of Euboea. According to modern British historian William St. Clair, irony and hostility towards Voutier, who also returned to Greece in 1826, led to a duel between two Frenchmen. Voutier and Raybaud were both injured in a duel.

Raybaud then went to France and returned to Greece again in 1828, during the French military expedition of Morea ordered by General Maison, and this time to publish a Franco-Greek newspaper. With the support of the Greek president Ioannis Kapodistrias, he founded in Patras print shop, where he published the French-speaking newspaper "Herald of the East" (Le Courrier d'Orient), with the help of Jacques Mangeart. The newspaper was published until 1829.

=== Last years ===
Subsequently, Raybaud is referred as Consul of France in Cyprus and General Consul of France in Haïti.

== Decorations ==
- Knight (31 March 1837) of the Legion of Honour (France).
- Officer (17 November 1849) of the Legion of Honour (France).
- Commander (26 May 1852) of the Legion of Honour (France).
- Officer (28 October 1836) of the Order of the Redeemer (Greece).
- Commander of the Order of Charles III (Spain).
- Knight (31 March 1847) of the Order of the Southern Cross (Brazil).
- Knight (9 November 1852) of the Order of Pope Pius IX (Vatican).

== Publications ==
- Maxime Raybaud, Mémoires sur la Grèce pour servir à l'histoire de la guerre de l'Indépendance, accompagnés de plans topographiques, par Maxime Raybaud, avec une introduction historique, par Alph. Rabbe, Paris, Tournachon-Molin, Libraire, 1824–1825.
