= Timoleon (given name) =

Timoleon can be a masculine given name or a middle name. Notable people with the name include:

== Given name ==
- Timoleon Ambelas, Greek poet
- Timoleon Argyropoulos, Greek-born physicist, mathematician, and author
- Timoleon Filimon, Greek journalist, politician, intellectual, and tutor
- Timoleon Raimondi, Italian-born bishop of Hong Kong
- Timoleon Razelos, Greek sailor
- Timoleon Tsourekas (born 1970), Greek cross-country skier and coach
- Timoleon Vassos, Hellenic Army officer

== Middle name ==
- Julius Timoleon Ducatel, American chemist
- Carl Timoleon von Neff, Russian artist
