= Symvoulos Epicheiriseon =

Symvoulos Epicheiriseon Σύμβουλος Επιχειρήσεων
- Type: Weekly
- Format: N/A
- Owner(s): N/A
- Founded: 1987
- Headquarters: Patras, Greece
- Website: www.symboulos.gr

Symvoulos Epicheiriseon (Greek: Σύμβουλος Επιχειρήσεων, English: Council of Businesses) is a newspaper that features mainly economic news from the Patras area. It is based in Patras in Achaea, southwestern Greece. It was first published in 1987 and was a monthly newspaper until 1994, it became biweekly during that time. Since 2000, it appears weekly.

== See also ==
- List of newspapers in Greece
