= Splats =

Fanzine with comics

- Type: fanzine
- Format: N/A
- Owner: N/A
- Founded: N/A
- Headquarters: Patras, Greece

Splats (Greek: Σπλατς) is a fanzine with comics. It is sold mainly within Patras as well as other cities. The volume does not number and its stories are entirely humoristic.

== See also ==
- List of newspapers in Greece
