= Eleousa Monastery =

- Μονή Αγίας Ελεούσης
- Interactive map of Eleousa Monastery

Monastery information
- Other name: Panagia Eleousa Monastery
- Established: 1510
- Dedication: Nativity of the Theotokos
- Celebration: September 8
- Diocese: Metropolis of Patras

Site
- Location: Salmeniko, Achaia
- Country: Greece
- Coordinates: 38°15′39″N 21°54′40″E

The Eleousa Monastery (Greek: Μονή Αγίας Ελεούσης) is an Orthodox female monastery dedicated to the Nativity of the Theotokos.

It is located at an altitude of approximately 610 meters in the northeastern foothills of Panahaiko, near the southern ends of Ziria, its tributary. It is located on the southern road, which leads from Agios Vasileios, Rio to Kamares, between the villages of Pititsa, Voteni and the settlements of Salmeniko. Access is very easy by car.

== History of the Monastery ==
It is a modern monastery, but it is unknown when it was originally created, perhaps in the 14th century or later. The original site of the monastery, the so-called "Old Monastery", was located just outside the village of Pititsa, where the cavernous Naidrium of the Ascension is located, which was used as the original katholikon (mainly temple) of the Monastery. However, the original monastery was abandoned due to the harsh winter conditions and moved to its current lower location.

In the "Old Monastery", where in the past there were ruins of cells as well as the ruined church of Agios Charalambos, frescoes are preserved, the study of the technique of which has concluded that they were probably created at the end of the 17th century, while a second layer of frescoes from the 18th century has also been identified.

There are opinions that a patriarchal seal of 1741 refers to the monastery as a share of the Monastery of Panagia Vlacherna, an old monastery of Ilia that was then ecclesiastically subordinated to the then Metropolis of Old Patras. According to traditions, women and children had found shelter in the "Old Monastery" during the Revolution of 1821, whom Golfinos Loubistanos betrayed by causing their death. In 1834 it was considered a dissolved Monastery. According to an inscription, the catholicon of the Monastery of Saint Eleousa was renovated in 1854.

Until 1930 it functioned as a male monastery, then it was dissolved and reconstructed in 1947; since then it has been functioning as a female monastery.

== Sources ==
- Αποτελέσματα της Απογραφής Πληθυσμού-Κατοικιών 2011 που αφορούν στο Μόνιμο Πληθυσμό της Χώρας, Εφημερίδα της Κυβερνήσεως της Ελληνικής Δημοκρατίας, τχ. 2ο, φ. 3465 (28 Δεκεμβρίου 2012).
- Ε.Σ.Υ.Ε. - Μόνιμος Πληθυσμός της Ελλάδος. Απογραφή 2001, Αθήνα 2004. ISBN 960-86704-8-9.
- Κώστας Ν. Τριανταφύλλου, Ιστορικόν Λεξικόν των Πατρών, Τόμοι Α΄-Β΄, Τυπογραφείο Πέτρου Χρ. Κούλη, Πάτρα 1995, Τρίτη Έκδοση, λήμμα Ελεούσης, λήμμα Μοναί.
