= You FM (Greece) =

Former radio station in Patras, Greece

YouFM 100.1
- Patras; Greece
- Broadcast area: Achaia
- Frequency: 100.1 MHz

Programming
- Language: Greek
- Format: Pop music, rarely any variety
- Affiliations: 95.2 Athens DeeJay (2004–2007)

Ownership
- Owner: George Katsaros and Theodore Katsiroubas

History
- First air date: 1989
- Last air date: 2021
- Former names: Step FM (1989–2004); Patras DeeJay (2004–2007)

YouFM was a radio station broadcasting on 100.1 MHz serving Patras, Achaia and the western portion of Greece. The station was a mixture of variety and Top 40. The station was originally launched in 1989, as Step FM.

In 2004, Step FM started partnership with 95.2 Athens DeeJay to rebroadcast programs and was renamed Patras DeeJay. After three years, in 2007 the partnership with the Attica station was dissolved and renamed YouFM with its official program starting on October 1 of the same year.

Constantinos Saradis was the program director in the period of 2007 up to 2010. Then, the station changed, Diamantis Kyriakakis, as the last program director made a lot of changes to the program, and also in the music. From the summer of 2010 until its closure, it was the most popular radio station in Patras for all ages especially in the target group from 20 to 35 years old.

== Slogan ==
Its slogan till 2010 was O freskos ixos tis Patras (which means The Fresh Sound of Patras). In 2011, a new slogan added along with previous one, the No1 xari se sena (No1 thanks to YOU!). Diamantis Kiriakakis after May 2012 replaced this slogan with the new one To Agapimeno Sou Radiofono that means «Your Favorite Radio» or «Your Favorite Station». Another slogan was «The best foreign music in the city».

== Closure ==
In early 2020, the NCRTV decided to delete YouFM 100.1 as for a long time it has not submitted information about the inner workings of the business that operated it. However, it continued to operate until the end of the following year when it permanently stopped broadcasting.
