= Sokratis Skartsis =

Greek poet and writer (1936–2024)

Sokratis Skartsis Σωκράτης Σκαρτσής
- Born: 1936; Patras, Greece
- Died: 18 December 2024 (aged 88); Patras, Greece
- Occupations: Poet; Writer; University teacher
- Spouse: Evangelia Nikoloudaki
- Children: 3

Sokratis Skartsis (Greek: Σωκράτης Σκαρτσής, 1936 – 18 December 2024) was a Greek poet and writer, as well as a professor at the University of Patras. He was also a founding member of the University of Patras Poetry Symposium. He published 150 books, including poetry, literature studies, etc. Skartsis died in Patras on 18 December 2024, at the age of 88.

== Works ==
Year	Title	Greek transliteration and English name	Publisher	ISBN
1979	Haikou kai Senryou	Χαϊκού και Σένρυου; Haiku and Senryū	Ostraka	–
1983	Praktika tou 1° simbossiou piisis	Πρακτικά του Α' συμποσίου νεοελληνικής ποίησης	Gnossi	-
1983	Praktika defterou simbossiou piisis:	Πρακτικά δευτέρου συμποσίου ποίησης	Gnosi	-
1985	Praktika tetartou simbosiou piisis afieroma sto dimotiko tragoudi	Πρακτικά τετάρτου συμποσίου ποίησης : αφιέρωμα στο δημοτικό τραγούδι	Gnosi	-
1987	Praktika ektou simbbosiou piisis: neoelliniki metapolemiki piisi (1945–1985)	Πρακτικά έκτου συμποσίου ποίησης : νεοελληνική μεταπολεμική ποίηση (1945–1985); Last part: Modern Greek Postwar Poetry (1945–1985)	Gnosi	-
1987	Dimotika tragoudia - Antholoyia	Δημοτικά τραγούδια - Ανθολογία; Folk Music - Anthology	-	-
1987	Sighroni amerikani piites - Piitiki anthologia	Σύγχρονοι αμερικανοί ποιητές - Ποιητική ανθολογία Several American Poets - Poetic Anthology	Kastanioti	0
1988	Afrikanika tragoudia	Αφρικάνικα τραγούδια African Songs	Kastanioti	ISBN 960-03-0015-1
1988	Chako - Mia indianiki teletourgia	Χάκο - Μια ινδιάνικη τελετουργία	Kastanioti	ISBN 960-03-0017-8
1989	Kojiki - Archaia jiaponeziki epiki chronografia	Κοτζίκι - Αρχαία γιαπωνέζικη επική χρονογραφία Kojiki - Ancient Japanese Epic Chronography	Kastanioti	ISBN 960-03-0319-3
1989	Marmaro tis aplas - Poiimata	Μάρμαρο της άπλας - Ποιήματα	Kastanioti	ISBN 960-03-0213-8
1989	Afstralezika tragoudia	Αυστραλέζικα τραγούδια Australian Songs	Kastanioti	ISBN 960-03-0321-5
1989	Islandikes sagkes	Ισλανδικές σάγκες Icelandic Sagas	Kastanioti	ISBN 960-03-0464-5
1990	-Haikou kai senryou - Giaponezika tristiha	Χαϊκού και σένριου - Γιαπωνέζικα τρίστιχα fHaiku And Senryū - Japanese Triplets	Kastanioti	ISBN 960-03-0021-6
1992	Avesta	Αβέστα	Kastanioti	ISBN 960-03-0940-X
1993	Tragoudia tis Polynisia	Τραγούδια της Πολυνησίας; From Polynesia	Kastanioti	ISBN 960-03-0936-1
1994	Oraies etaires - 150 epigrammata apo to 5 vivlio tis ellinikis anthologias	Ωραίες εταίρες - 150 επιγράμματα από το Ε βιβλίο της ελληνικής ανθολογίας	Govosti	ISBN 960-270-608-2
1994	Isagoyi sti laiki logotehnia	Εισαγωγή στη λαϊκή λογοτεχνία Introduction On Folk Literature	Ellinika Grammata	ISBN 960-344-045-0
1994	Arhea eliniki erotiki piisi	Αρχαία ελληνική ερωτική ποίηση - Μια ανθολογία Ancient Greek Erotic Poems	Kastanioti	ISBN 960-03-1231-1
1994	To Dimotiki tragoudi, two volumes	Το δημοτικό τραγούδι The Folk Music	Pataki	ISBN 960-293-210-4 (1st); ISBN 960-293-211-2 (2nd)
1994	I epodi	Η επωδή The Incantations	Ellinika Grammata	ISBN 960-344-044-2
1994	I anasa is athanasias	Η ανάσα της αθανασίας	Govostis	ISBN 960-270-736-4
1995	Mikro dpkimio gisa ti glosa	Μικρό δοκίμιο για τη γλώσσα	Paratiritis	ISBN 960-260-814-5
1995	'Anthologia tis neoellinikis poiisis - Georgios Chortatsis	Ανθολογία της νεοελληνικής ποίησης - Γεώργιος Χορτάτσης; Anthology Of Modern Greek Poems - Georgios Chortatsis	Govostis	ISBN 960-270-729-1
1995	Anthologia tis neoellinkis poiisis - Vyzantini poiisi	Ανθολογία της νεοελληνικής ποίησης - Βυζαντινή ποίηση Anthology Of Modern Greek Poems - Byzantine Poetry	Govostis	ISBN 960-270-717-8
1995	Anthologia tis neoellinikis poiisis - Metavyzantini poiisi	Ανθολογία της νεοελληνικής ποίησης - Μεταβυζαντινή ποίηση Anthology Of Modern Greek Poems - Post-Byzantine Poems	Govotsis	ISBN 960-270-718-6
1995	Anthologis tis neoellinikis poiisis - Vitsentzos Kornaros	Ανθολογία της νεοελληνικής ποίησης - Βιτσέντζος Κορνάρος; Anthology Of Modern Greek Poems - Vitsentzos Kornaros	Govotsis	ISBN 960-270-731-3
1995	Anthologia tis neoellinikis poiisis - Kritiki poiisi tou 17ou eona	Ανθολογία της νεοελληνικής ποίησης - Κρητική ποίηση του 17ου αιώνα Anthology of Modern Greek Poems - Cretan Poems Of The 17th century	Govotsis	ISBN 960-270-730-5
1996	Anthologia tis neoellinikis poiisis - Mechri to Solomo	Ανθολογία της νεοελληνικής ποίησης - Μέχρι το Σολωμό; Anthology of Modern Greek Poems - Up To Solomos	Govotsis	ISBN 960-270-760-7
1996	Anthologia tis neoellinikis poiisis - Ioannia Vilaras-Athanassios	Ανθολογία της νεοελληνικής ποίησης - Ιωάννης Βηλαράς-Αθανάσιος; Anthology Of Modern Greek Poems - Ioannis Vilaras-Athanassios	Govotsis	ISBN 960-270-756-9
1996	Anthologia tis neoellinikis poiisis - Lambros Porfyras	Ανθολογία της νεοελληνικής ποίησης - Λάμπρος Πορφύρας; Anthology Of Modern Greek Poems - Lambros Porfyras	Govotsis	ISBN 960-270-758-5
1996	Oi treis epistoles - Ston Irodoto, ston Pythokli, ston Menoikea	Οι τρείς επιστολές - Στον Ηρόδοτο, στον Πυθοκλή, στον Μενοικέα; The Three Epistles - On Herodotus, On Pythocles, On Menoeceus	University of Patras Press	ISBN 960-530-003-6
1996	To soma tis glosas - O Marcel Jousse kai i paradossi tis organikis glossas	Το σώμα της γλώσσας - Ο Marcel Jousse και η παράδοση της οργανικής γλώσσας The Body Of The Language - Marcel Jousse And The Usage Of The Organic Language	Ellinika Grammata	ISBN 960-344-101-5
1996	I ipervatiki empeira - Mia anthologisi apospasmaton	Η υπερβατική εμπειρία - Μια ανθολόγηση αποσπασμάτων University Of Patras Press	ISBN 960-530-008-7	
1997	Grafi gia poiisi	Γραφή για ποίηση Writings For Poetry	Ellinika Grammata	ISBN 960-344-409-X
1997	Kosmikos erotas	Κοσμικός έρωτας	University Of Patras Press	ISBN 960-530-006-0
1997	I Poiisis tis Patras 1960-1966 - Ena Chroniko	Η ποίηση της Πάτρας 1960-1996 - Ένα χρονικό The Poetry Of Patras 1960–1966, A Chronicle	University Of Patras Press	ISBN 960-530-010-9
1997	I Parimia	Η παροιμία	Ellinika Gramata	ISBN 960-344-282-8
1998	Ap' to nero os t' oneiro - Peza keimena	Απ το νερό ως τ όνειρο - Πεζά κείμενα	Kedros	ISBN 960-04-1483-1
1998	Frasseis tou laikou logou	Φράσεις του λαϊκού λόγου Phrases From Folk Words	Ellinika Grammata	ISBN 960-344-522-3
1998	Anthologia ellinikis poiisis kai tragoudiou - 1° pagkosmio sinedrio: I Archaia Ellada kai o sychronos kosmos	Ανθολογία ελληνικής ποίησης και τραγουδιού - Α παγκόσμιο συνέδριο: Η Αρχαία Ελλάδα και ο σύγχρονος κόσμος. The Greek Poetry And Song Anthology	University Of Patras Press	
1999	Mia praktiki eisagogi stin analissi tis piisis	Μια πρακτική εισαγωγή στην ανάλυση της ποίησης A Practical Introduction To Poetry Analysis	Pataki	ISBN 960-7528-15-8
1999	I neotita tis poiisis - Mia poiitiki agogi	Η νεότητα της ποίησης - Μια ποιητική αγωγή	Ellinika Grammata	ISBN 960-293-089-6
1999	Mikromorfes tis laikis logotechnias	Μικρομορφές της λαϊκής λογοτεχνίας Minor Changes On Folk Literature	Ellinika Grammata	ISBN 960-344-766-8
1999	Andreas Belezinis - Mia zoi marmarou	Ανδρέας Μπελεζίνης - Μια ζωή μαρμάρου Andreas Belezinis - A Marble Life	Ellinika Grammata	1999, ISBN 960-344-793-5
2000	Glossika kai poiitika	Γλωσσικά και ποιητικά Linguistics And Poetics	Ellinika Grammata	ISBN 960-344-992-X
2000	Ta fila kai i karpi - Mia piitiki anthologia	Τα φύλλα και οι καρποί - Μια ποιητική ανθολογία These Pages And Fruits - A Poetic Anthology	University Of Patras Press	ISBN 960-530-046-X
2000	I zoi mas gimni san antikimeno - Mia pezografiki anthologia	Η ζωή μας γυμνή σαν αντικείμενο - Μια πεζογραφική ανθολογία	University Of Patras Press	ISBN 960-530-037-0
2001	Revmata sti sygchronoi poiisi -Praktika dekatou enatou symposiou poiisis: Panepistimiou Patron, 2-4 Iouliou 1999	Ρεύματα στη σύγχρονη ποίηση - Πρακτικά δεκάτου ενάτου συμποσίου ποίησης: Πανεπιστήμιο Πατρών; A Stream In The Same Poems	Peri Technon	ISBN 960-86946-4-7
2001	Agalma pnois. Ethria	Άγαλμα πνοής	Gavriilidis	-
2001	Avgi	Αυγή	Gavriilidis	-
2002	To fos tou nerou - Mia anthologisi ai nea poiisi	Το φώς του νερού - Μια ανθολόγηση και νέα ποίηση Light Of The Water - An Anthology And A New Poetry	Peri Technon	ISBN 960-8260-23-X
2002	Ta alla prossopa tis zois - Simiossis glossikis praxis	Τα άλλα πρόσωπα της ζωής - Σημειώσεις γλωσσικής πράξης The Other Face OF Life - Important Linguistic Transaction		ISBN 960-8260-07-8
2002	I proforikotita	Η προφορικότητα	Ellinika Grammata	ISBN 960-393-927-7
2004	Ta vivliou tou maxilariou	Το βιβλίο του μαξιλαριού The Bed Book	Kastanioti	ISBN 960-03-0024-0
2003	Sei Sonaggon	Σέι Σόναγγον	Kastanioti	ISBN 960-03-0024-0
2004	Kinezoi poiites	Κινέζοι ποιητές Chinese poets		ISBN 960-03-0022-4
2004	Kimena tis engis Anatolis	Κείμενα της εγγύς Ανατολής	Kastanioti	ISBN 960-03-0318-5
2004	Indianika tragoudia	Ινδιάνικα τραγούδια Indian Music	Kastanioti	ISBN 960-03-0016-X
2004	Grafta ke andigrafta ke ekato forest to adinato	Γραφτά και αντίγραφα και εκατό φορές το αδύνατο Writings And Non-Writings And A Hundred Times Powerless	Peri Tehnon	ISBN 960-8260-54-X
2004	Kimana tis engis Anatilis - To epos tou Gilgames: Enouma Elis: I kathodos tis Inanna	Κείμενα της Εγγύς Ανατολής - Το έπος του Γιλγαμές: Ενούμα Έλις: Η κάθοδος της Ινάννα	Kastanioti	ISBN 960-03-0318-5
2005	I alles ores	Οι άλλες ώρες These Other Times	Gavriilidis	ISBN 960-336-153-4
2005	I Achaiki poiisi - 1950-2005: Mia perisynagogi	Η αχαϊκή ποίηση - 1950-2005: Μια περισυναγωγή	Peri Technon, Patras	ISBN 960-8260-90-6
2006	Anthologia neoellinikis poiisis - Kon. Chatzopoulos	Ανθολογία νεοελληνικής ποίησης - Κων. Χατζόπουλος; Anthology Of Modern Greek Poems - Kon. Chatzopoulos	Govotsi	ISBN 960-270-757-7
2006	Praktika ikostou pebtou simposiou piisis - 25 chronia simposio, 25 chronia piisi: Panepistimiou Patron, 1-3 Iouliou 2005	Πρακτικά εικοστού πέμπτου συμποσίου ποίησης - 25 χρόνια συμπόσιο, 25 χρόνια ποίηση: Πανεπιστήμιο Πατρών, 1-3 Ιουλίου 2005; Practical 25th Poetry Council - 25 Years Of Symposiums And Poetry: University Of Patras, 1–3 July 2005	Peri Technon	ISBN 960-6684-04-0
2006	Grammi	Γραμμή; Line	Govotsi	ISBN 960-270-779-8
2007	Kinezi anahorites piites	Κινέζοι αναχωρητές ποιητές Chinese Hermitage Poems	Kastanioti	ISBN 978-960-03-4373-1
2007	Erotika poiimata tis Sanskritikis	Ερωτικά ποιήματα της Σανσκριτικής; Sanskrit Erotic Poems	Kastantioti	ISBN 978-960-03-4374-8

== Sources ==
- 115 Poems - E. E. Cummings, Cummings, E. E. (Edward Estlin), 1999 ISBN 960-210-357-4
- Turkish Heroic Chronography, Korkut, Dede 1993 ISBN 960-03-0939-6
- The first version of the article is translated and is based from the article at the Greek Wikipedia (el:Main Page)
