= Ionion FM =

Ionion FM, simply known as Ionion, is a Greek radio station broadcasting on 95.5 MHz. It serves the western portion of Greece. The station is a mixture of variety and Top 40. The station is named after the Ionian Sea and on its slogans, it reads ...not the sea, the radio station (Ionion, ohi ton pelagos...). One of the jingles featured Fred Flintstone (from The Flintstones) in his original voice and said Yabba Dabba Doo, leave a message, I'll get back to you. The station is full of informative news and commentary. In the period of 2002 up to 2010, it was rebroadcasting with Skai 100.3. From 2010 until today, it rebroadcasts with Real FM 97.8 of Athens.
