= Le Courrier d'Orient =

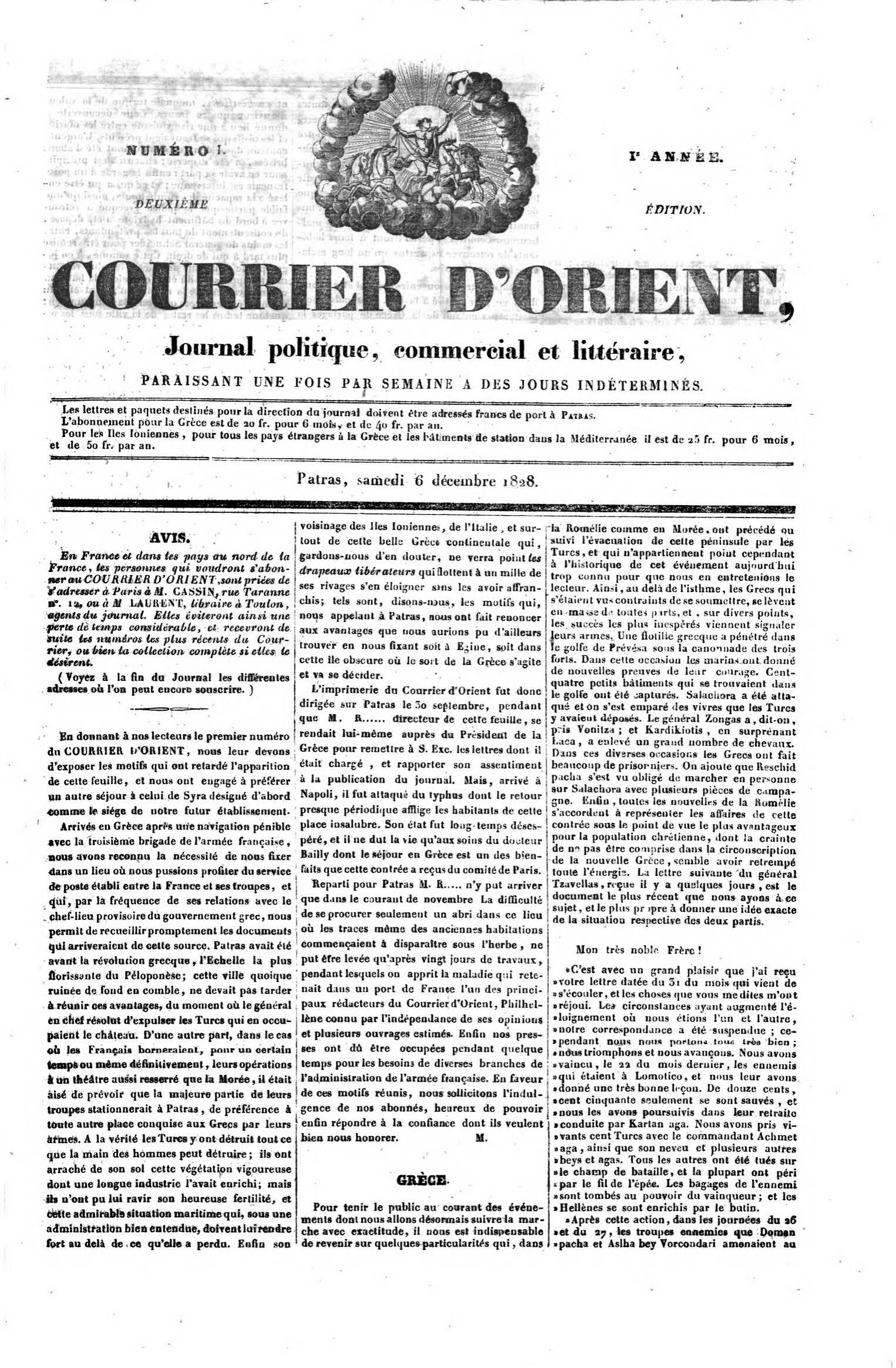
- Format: N/A
- Owner: Maxime Raybaud
- Founded: 1828
- Ceased publication: 1829
- Language: French
- Headquarters: Patras, Greece

Le Courrier d'Orient (Courier of Orient) was a French language newspaper that was published in Greece, first in Patras then in Aegina. It was published between 1828 and 1829 during the final years of the Greek War of Independence by Lieutenant-colonel Maxime Raybaud, a French philhellene who served in the expeditionary corps of Morea of General Maison in 1828. Raybaud was helped in this task by Jacques Mangeart. The newspaper was first published weekly, then fortnightly. It was mainly intended for French officers and soldiers. It was then published by the French expedition in Athens, under the title Le Courrier de la Grèce, published for the first time on 13 November 1828.

== See also ==
- List of newspapers in Greece
