= Dimitrios Tofalos =

Greek weightlifter

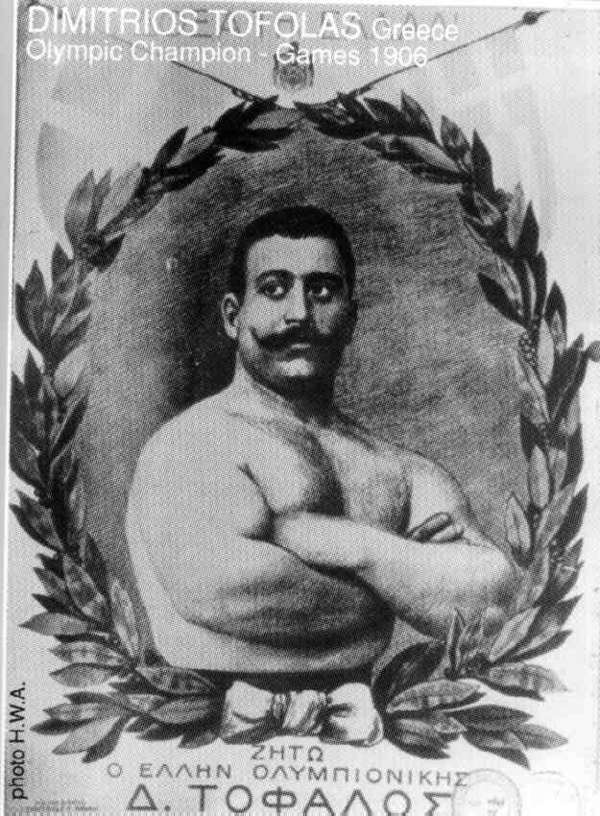
- Dimitris Tofalos, 1906 gold medalist
Medal record
Men's weightlifting
Representing Greece
Intercalated Games
| Gold medal – first place | 1906 Athens | Two hand lift |

Dimitrios Tofalos (Greek: Δημήτριος Τόφαλος, April 14, 1884 in Patras, Greece – November 15, 1966) was a Greek weightlifter. He was a member of both Gymnastiki Etaireia Patron and Panachaikos Gymnastikos syllogos, that merged in 1923 to become Panachaiki Gymnastiki Enosi. Arguably the greatest weightlifter of the early 20th century, he won the gold medal in the 1906 Intercalated Games, setting a world record that lasted until 1914. Dimitrios Tofalos Arena is named after him.

== Early years ==
Tofalos' herculean strength was obvious from his childhood. Everybody talked about his physical abilities, and for some time he was considered a child prodigy, since he survived a very serious accident. He was playing around a railway station, when a wagon came down on him and almost smashed his arm. He was taken to the hospital, where the doctors declared that his arm should be amputated. Tofalos' father opposed to it and finally proved to be right. His son recovered, but as a result of the accident one of his arms was shorter than the other. His physical defect did not stop him from becoming one of the greatest Greek athletes of all time.

== 1906 Intercalated Games ==
Unable to take part in the 1904 Summer Olympics due to a disease, he competed at the 1906 Intercalated Games, where he took part in the two-days weightlifting competition with both hands. On the first day the gold winner was not decided yet, so the next day two weightlifters fought each other for the gold medal; Tofalos and Austrian giant Josef Steinbach. Both of them lifted 136.5 kg very easily. They then had to lift 142.5 kg, but both Tofalos and Steinbach failed on their 1st attempt. The Greek champion broke his own world record by lifting the weight on his third attempt, whereas the Austrian athlete with a rushed and rather anxious move failed without even managing to bring the bar close to his knees. Tofalos won the gold medal, while fans were cheering him frantically. His record lasted until 1914.

== In the USA and comeback ==
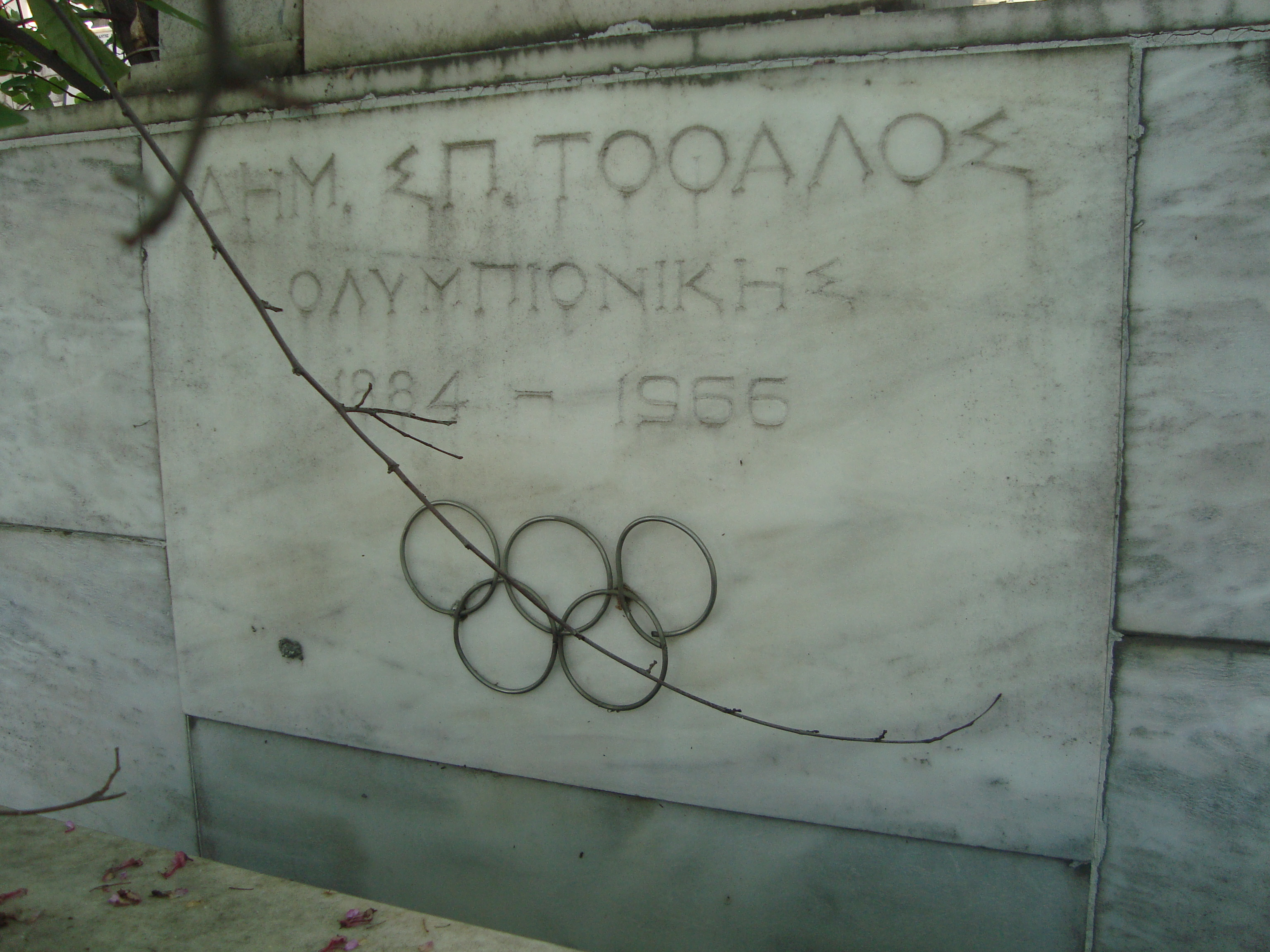
Dimitris Tofalos' grave in the first cemetery of Patras

In 1910, Tofalos travelled to the United States for financial reasons. He worked as a professional wrestler and became famous for his persistence rather than his strength. There were many reports about Tofalos for a long time, when he refused to give up a game after a crushing arm-lock by the American World Heavyweight Wrestling Champion Frank Gotch, who always forced his competitor to give up. His persistence cost Tofalos three months in the hospital, but that incident contributed to his legend.

After retiring, he spent many years of his life being the manager of Jim Londos, a professional wrestler who was one of the most popular stars wrestling offered during the Great Depression. He eventually went back to his native Patras in 1952, where he spent the last three years of his life. The municipality of Patras honored him by naming a newly built arena after him in 1995.

== Gallery ==
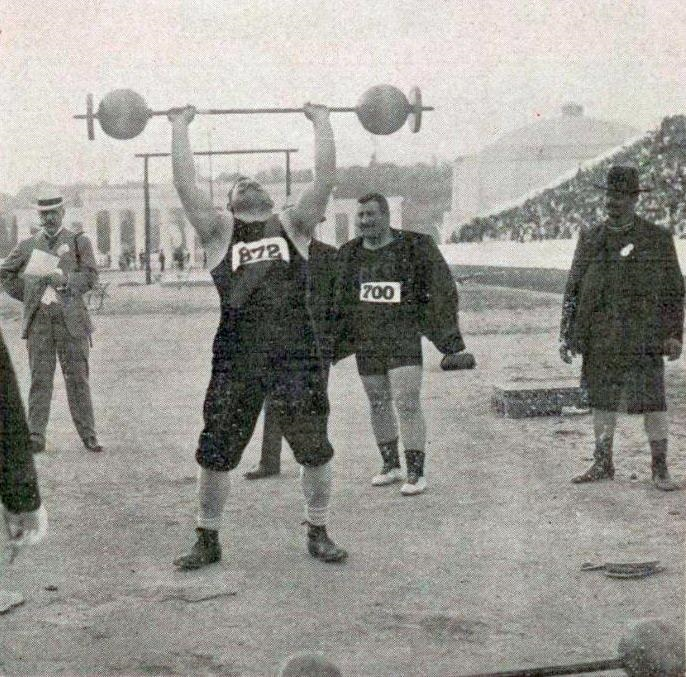
Dimitrios Tofalos (no. 700) behind Steinbach (no. 872) at the 1906 Intercalated Games.

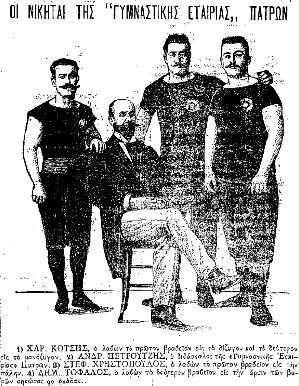
Tofalos with his co-athletes of G.E. Patras.

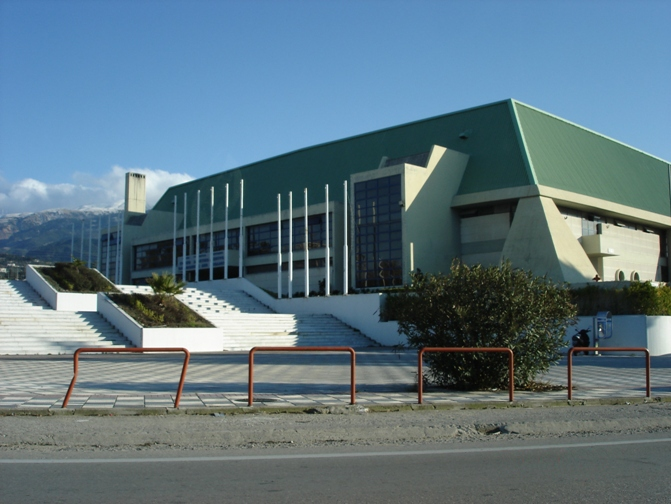
Dimitrios Tofalos Arena.
