= Xenofon Verykios =

Xenofon Verykios (Greek: Ξενοφών Βερύκιος, born 1951) is a Greek poet, and a professor in chemical engineering at the University of Patras.

Verykios is a member and benefactor of the Administrative Committee of TEI of the Ionian Islands. He is also the president of the Poetic Symposium.

He received a B.S. in chemical engineering from Bucknell University in 1975. He received an M.S. in 1977 and a Ph.D in 1979 from Lehigh University.

== Books ==
Title	Greek transliteration	English name	Publisher	ISBN code
Ikade kai alla poimata asafous katefthinisseos	Οίκαδε και άλλα ποιήματα ασαφούς κατευθύνσεως	-	Diatton Publishers	ISBN 978-960-7031-79-2
Poiites tis Patras stis glosses tis Evropis	Ποιητές της Πάτρας στις γλώσσες της	Poets From Patras In Languages Of Europe	Polyedro Publishers; 1st Edition, Patras	ISBN 960-89539-0-1
