= Spyridon Vasileiadis =

Greek poet and playwright

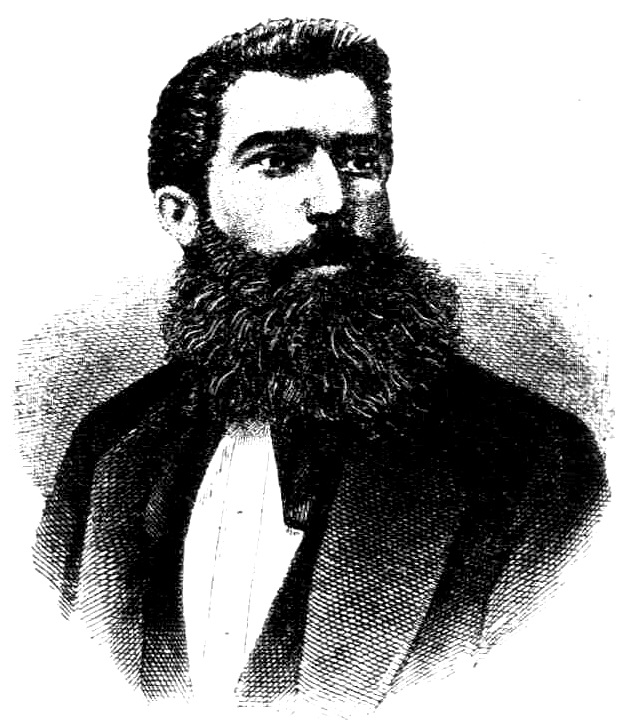
- Born: 6 December 1845; Patras, Greece
- Died: 30 August 1874 (aged 28); Paris, France
- Occupations: poet, playwright

Spyridon Vasileiadis (Greek: Σπυρίδων Βασιλειάδης; 6 December 1845 – 30 August 1874) was a Greek poet and playwright. Several of his works were translated into French. He was a member of the Parnassos Philological Society. He died in Paris, aged 28.

== Bibliography ==
Selected works:

- Eikones kai kymata
- Attikai nyktes
- Galateia, drama
