= Peloponnisos (newspaper) =

- Type: Daily newspaper
- Format: Broadsheet
- Owner(s): Louloudis Theodoros
- Founded: 1886
- Political alignment: Centre right
- Headquarters: Maizonos 206 Street, Patras
- Price: €1,20
- Website: https://pelop.gr/

Peloponnisos (Greek: Πελοπόννησος) is a Greek regional daily newspaper published in Patras, the capital of the Peloponnese peninsula from which took its name.

It was founded in 1886 and remains one of the most widely circulated papers in the city of Patras. It is sold also in parts of Peloponnesus and Athens. It is one of the oldest surviving and most historic newspapers in Greece.

== See also ==
- List of newspapers in Greece

== General Books ==
- Νίκος Ε. Πολίτης, Χρονικό του πατραϊκού τύπου 1840-1940, Patras 1984. (in Greek)
