= Spyros Vrettos =

Greek poet (born 1960)

Spyros Vrettos (Greek: Σπύρος Βρεττός, born 1960 in the island of Lefkada) is a Greek poet. He later studied at law school in the University of Athens.

== Works ==
Year	Title	Greek transliteration	English name	Publisher
1985	Os Azteki stis Azores	Ως Αζτέκοι στις Αζόρες	The Aztecs In The Azores	Plethron
1988	Se mavro plou	Σε μαύρο πλου, Αχαϊκές Εκδόσεις	-	Ahaikes Ekdoseis
1992	Akinita matia	Ακίνητα μάτια	Unmoved Eyes	Diatton
2003	Praxi apli	Πράξη απλή	Gavriilidis Publishers	
2006	Kostas Karyotakis, To egkomio tis fygis	Κώστας Καρυωτάκης. Το εγκώμιο της φυγής	-	Gavriilidis, Athens
