= Markos Sklivaniotis =

Greek writer and a poet (born 1954)

Markos Sklivaniotis (Greek: Μάρκος Σκληβανιώτης) is a Greek writer and a poet.

He was born in Patras, Greece, 1954. He studied chemical engineering in Aristotelion University of Thessaloniki and following that he was engaged in research in the University of Leeds, UK, achieving his Ph.D. degree in 1982. He worked for many years in Patras, In the Municipal Water Utility Sector DEYAP, currently he is retired.

== Works ==
=== Poems ===
Year	Title	Greek transliteration and English name	Publisher	ISBN
2001	I mystiki prosefchi tou Odyssea	Η μυστική προσευχή του Οδυσσέα; The Secret Preyer Of Odysseus	Peri Technon, Patras	ISBN 960-86814-9-9
2004	Agkalia me ton aspalatho	Αγκαλιά με τον ασπάλαθο Embracing the gorse	Gavriilidis, Athens	ISBN 978-0-00-336342-5
2006	Sinepies tou pragmatikou	Συνέπειες του πραγματικού The consequences of the real	Gavriilidis, Athens	ISBN 960-336-167-4
2010	KAVA	ΚΑΒΑ; Wine Cellar	Gavriilidis, Athen	ISBN 978-960-336-529-7

=== Books ===
Year	Title	Greek transliteration and English name	ISBN
2004	Piotia posimou nerou, Patras: Dimotiki Epihirissi Idrefsis-Apohetefsis Patras	Ποιότητα Πόσιμου Νερού, Πάτρα, Δημοτική Επιχείρηση Υδρευσης Αποχέτευσης Πάτρας; Drinking Water Quality, Patras, Municipal Enterprise for Water and Sewage of Patras	ISBN 960-88086-0-X
