= Antonios Kalamogdartis =

Greek revolutionary leader and politician

Αντώνιος Καλαμογδάρτης
- Born: 1810; Patras, (now Greece)
- Died: 1856 (age 46); Kalavryta, Greece
- Occupation: Greek revolutionary leader

Antonios Kalamogdartis (Greek: Αντώνιος Καλαμογδάρτης, 1810–1856) was a Greek revolutionary leader and a politician which he was elected many times.

He was born in 1810 in Patras. He continued his studies and he began to learn French and Italian. He was enrolled into the military body of Favieros. He battled many battles and distincted him in the siege of the Acropolis in Athens. He was an attorney at the national council between 1843 and 1844.

He was councilled into the in 1854 and battled the Turks for the liberation of Epirus where he was hurt and injured. He later pardoned freely and mainly headed for Nafplio and later for Patras. He translated many poems from French and Italian and was the poetic literature. He had in occupation in the outer area in the area of Chalkomata in that and had the name the desert of Chalkomata.

He was married to Vasiliki Lontou, sister of the mayor of Patras Andreas Ch. Lontos and had two daughters.
