= Dimokratis (newspaper) =

Dimokratis (Greek: Δημοκράτης) is a daily regional Greek newspaper, published on the island of Lesbos.

It was founded in 1928 with centrist political alignment by journalist Terpandros Anastasiadis with the support of Georgios Papandreou, MP then of the region.

== Sources ==
- Τύπος, ιδιοκτήτες και πολιτική
