= Stochos =

Stochos Στόχος
- Type: newspaper
- Founded: 1985
- Political alignment: Conservatism
- Language: Greek
- Price: €1.50
- Website: http://www.stoxos.gr/

Stochos (Greek: Στόχος, English: Target) is a nationalist Greek weekly newspaper, first published in 1985. It was founded by Georgios Kapsalis (d. 1999). Until the death of its founder, the newspaper was strictly conservative, rejecting all political parties. The newspaper during its new era, has changed some of its policies about all political parties rejection and sometimes is friendly with conservative parties, like Greek Solution political party.
