= Super B (TV channel) =

- Country: Greece
- Broadcast area: Peloponnese, southern Central Greece, Aetolia, Kythira, Phocis, in Corinthian gulf, in islands of Argosaronic, in southern Ionian islands, Boeotia and in western Attica

Programming
- Language: Greek
- Picture format: 576i (SDTV)

Ownership
- Owner: Super B S.A.

History
- Founded: 5 June 1991
- Launched: 1990
- Closed: 16 November 2022
- Replaced by: ProNews (2022 - 2024)

Links
- Website: Official Website

Super B was the first television station founded in West Greece in 1989 based in Patra and opened a year later. The objective of the management of the station was the creation and development of a healthy media which would contribute significantly to the cultural, social, sporting and economic life of the region.

In 33 years of operation, gave special emphasis to the independence of business and the creation of the necessary infrastructure in human resources and technical equipment. Super B covered the entire Western Greece, Peloponnese and Ionian Islands with modern television signal transmission technology.

In the past, the channel collaborated with Action 24 and the Greek franchise of MTV and Nickelodeon, rebroadcasting part of their programs, daily.

From November 16, 2022, Super B started a strategic partnership with ProNews sharing the program, showing mostly reports from domestic and international news.

== Ownership ==
In 1991, the S.A. that operates the channel was established under the name Super B Television, Radio, Production and Exploitation of Advertisements and Tapes of Southwest Greece. From 1996 to 2000, the company's activities included advertising services, market research and telesales. In 2000 the company took its current name by removing the production and exploitation of advertisements and tapes.

== Closure ==
At the end of 2024, the NCRTV decided to delist Super B/ProNews as it had stopped broadcasting due to financial problems.
