= Andreas Kontogouris =

Greek revolutionary leader

Andreas Kontogouris Ανδρέας Κοντογούρης
- Born: Cefalonia, (now Greece)
- Died: Greece
- Occupation: Greek revolutionary leader

Andreas Kontogouris (Greek: Ανδρέας Κοντογούρης, 1700s - 1824) was a Greek revolutionary leader during the Greek War of Independence.

He was born in the island of Cefalonia at the time it was in Venetian hands and later moved to Patras, on the present-day mainland of Greece, in 1786.

Kontogouris was counsellor to France, Spain, United States and other governments. He accumulated a great fortune and participated during the revolution. He also ran the Cefalonian Body, which he equipped at his own expense. When the Turks invaded Patras, he was chased away and returned to Kefalonia. Before he left, he set light to his warehouses, most of which were full, so that his goods would not fall into the hands of the Turks.
