= Timoleon Ambelas =

Greek poet (c. 1850–1929)

Timleon Ambelas Τιμολέων Αμπελάς
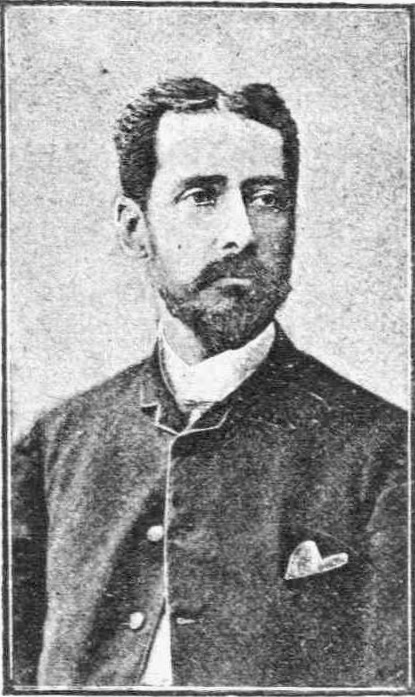
- Born: c. 1850; Patras, Greece
- Died: 1929; Athens, Greece
- Occupations: Journalist; writer

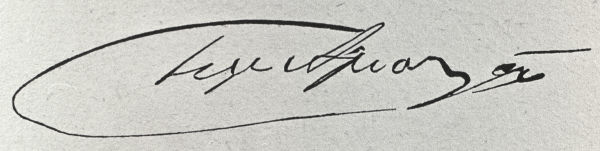
The signature of Timoleon Ampelas

Timleon Ambelas (Greek: Τιμολέων Αμπελάς, c. 1850–1929) was a Greek poet.

== Biography ==
Ampelas was born in the city of Patras in Greece and he lived much of his time in the capital city of Athens and in the island of Syros. He studied law in 1874 and became justice and withdrew totally from the judicial branch as judge of the court of appeal. From those members of the Philological Council of Athens Parnassos. He began to write theatrical works.

== Bibliography ==
Here are several works created by Ampelas:

Title	Greek transliteration	English name	Year	Publisher and/or Location
Istoria tis nissou Sirou	Ιστορία της νήσου Σύρου	History Of The Island Of Syros	1874	Ermoupoli
Alosis tis Troias	Άλωσις της Τροίας	-	-	-
Krites kai Venetoi	Κρήτες και Βενετοί	Cretans and Venetians	-	-
Neron (Neronas)	Νέρων	Nero	-	-
Kleopatra	Κλεοπάτρα	Cleopatra	-	Agkyra Publishers, Athens
Evros tis Thrakis	Έβρος της Θράκης	The Evros Of Thrace	-	-
Pro Tis Alamanas	Πρό της Αλαμάνας	-	-	-
Anamorfotai	Αναμορφωταί	Transformed	-	-
Prigkips tou Moreos, now Prigkipas tou Moreos		The Prince Of Morea	-	-

Τιμολέων Αμπελάς
