= Vasileios Christopoulos =

Greek writer

Vasileios Christopoulos (Greek: Βασίλειος Χριστόπουλος, b. 1951 in Patras, Greece) is a Greek writer.

He studied in Athens at the National Technical University of Athens and at the University of Glasgow as a civil engineer. He currently lives and works in Patras since 1976.

He wrote novels, members for the traditional architecture and essays of his works.

== Literature ==
Year	Title	Greek title	English title	Publisher	ISBN
1987	Techni: mia dynatotita	Τέχνη: μια δυνατότητα	Work: One Power	Achaikes ekdoseis	ISBN 9780007164028
1998	Katoikos Patron	Κάτοικος Πατρών	Resident of Patras	Kedros	ISBN 960-04-1458-0
1999	Orestis, o Patrinos Karagiozopaichtis Anestis Vakaloglou	Ορέστης, ο Πατρινός Καραγκιοζοπαίχτης Ανέστης Βακάλογλου	Orestis, the Karagioz performer Anestis Vakaloglou	Achaikes ekdoseis	ISBN 9789607960269
2002	Sto fos tis asetylinis	Στο φως της ασετυλίνης	In The Light Of Acetylene	Kedros	ISBN 960-04-2099-8
2005	Ki esy Ellinas, re;	Κι εσύ Έλληνας, ρε;	Are you a Greek, too, you?	Kedros	ISBN 960-04-2847-6
2008	Anazitontas to Theo	Αναζητώντας το Θεό	Looking for God	Kedros	ISBN 978-960-04-3837-6
2012	De tha isichasoume pote	Δεν θα ησυχάσουμε ποτέ	We will never be calm	Kedros	ISBN 978-960-04-4273-1
