= List of newspapers in Greece =

The number of national daily newspapers in Greece was 68 in 1950 and it increased to 156 in 1965.

Mid through the Greek financial crisis in 2016, on a national level there were 15 daily general interest, 11 daily sports, 4 daily business, 10 weekly and 16 Sunday newspapers in circulation.

On a local level, almost all regions of Greece have a printed newspaper.

Below is a list of newspapers published in Greece.

== Greek daily newspapers ==
Title	Established	Owner	Sunday Edition	Political orientation
Apogevmatini	1952	Apogevmatines Ekdoseis Monoprosopi AE	Yes	Liberal conservative
Avgi	1952	I Avgi Ekdotikos & Dimosiografikos Organismos SA	Yes	Left-wing
Dimokratia	2010	Dimokratikos Typos SA	Yes	Centre-right
Efimerida ton Syntakton	2012	Anexartita Mesa Maziki Enimerosis SA	No (a weekend edition is published on Saturday)	Left-wing
Eleftheri Ora	1981	ΜV Press Ltd	Yes	Centre-right
Eleftheros Typos	1916	SABD Ekdotiki SA	Yes	Liberal conservatism
Estia	1876	Estia Newspaper SA	Yes	Liberal conservative
Kathimerini	1919	Kathimerini Publishing SA	Yes	Liberal conservatism
Kontra News	2013	Kouris Media Group (in Greek)	Yes	Left-wing
O Logos	1986	Neo Typografiki MIKE	Yes	Centre-left
Rizospastis	1916	Communist Party of Greece	No (a weekend edition is published on Saturday)	Communism
Ta Nea	1931	Alter Ego Media SA	No (a weekend edition is published on Saturday)	Liberal conservatism
ToManifesto.gr	2022	To Manifesto Front Page IKE	No	Liberal conservatism

=== Greek daily specialized content newspapers ===
Title	Established	Owner	Sunday Edition	Type
Naftemporiki	1924	Ζοfrank Holdings Co. Ltd.	No	Financial
Espresso	2000	Estia Ependitiki SA	No (a weekend edition is published on Saturday)	Tabloid
Makeleio	2015	Makeleio Ltd (in Greek)	No (a weekend edition is published on Saturday)	Tabloid
On Time	2020	N/A	No (a weekend edition is published on Saturday)	Tabloid
Star Press	2014	Ellinikos Typos SA	No (a weekend edition is published on Saturday)	Tabloid

=== Greek daily sports newspapers ===
Title	Established	Affiliation
Fos (in Greek)	1955	Olympiacos
Kokkinos Protathlitis	1998	Olympiacos
Livesport	2012	Neutral
Metrosport	2000	PAOK Aris
Ora ton Spor	1991	AEK
SportDay (in Greek)	2005	Neutral
Sportime (online newspaper)	1994	Neutral

== Greek Weekly Newspapers ==
=== Greek Sunday newspapers ===
Title	Established	Owner	Political orientation
Documento (in Greek)	2016	Documento Media MIKE	Left-wing
Proto Thema	2005	Ekdoseis Proto Thema Ekdotiki SA	Centrism
Real News	2008	Real Media SA	Center
To Vima Ths Kyriakhs	1922	Alter Ego Media SA	Centrism

=== Greek weekly political newspapers ===
Title
Dromos tis Aristeras
Epochi
Karfitsa
Makedonia
Mpam
Parapolitika
Prin
Sto Karfi

To Paraskinio

To Paron

To Pοntiki (in Greek)
Vradyni

=== Greek weekly free press newspapers ===
Title	Established	Owner	Type	Day of publication
Athens Voice	2003	Fotis Georgeles	Alternative weekly	Thursday
LiFO	2005	Dyo Deka Ekdotiki SA	Alternative weekly	Thursday
Thessaloniki	2019	Makedonia Enimerosi SA	Alternative weekly	

=== Greek weekly betting newspapers ===
Title
12X
Kingbet
Match Money
Prognospor
Provlepsis sto Periptero

=== Greek weekly specialized content newspapers ===
Title	Type
Apopsi	Financial
Efimerida Dimoprasion	Financial
Echo Dimoprasion	Financial
Oikonomiki	Financial
Dimoprasiaki	Financial
Eleftheros Kosmos	Conservatism
Stochos	Conservatism

== Greek local and regional newspapers ==
Achaea
- Achagiotika Nea
- Kosmos
- Proini Gnomi
- Peloponnisos
- Simvoulos Epicheiriseon

Arta

- Icho tis Artas
- Taxidoromos Artas

Attica (Athens / Piraeus)

- Alpha Free Press
- Evdomi
- Foni tis Ydras
- Kinoniki Piraues
- Thriasio

Chania Crete

- Chaniotika Nea

Drama

- Proinos Tipos

Elia

- Patris
- Proti

Evia

- Evoiki Gnomi
- Eviathema.gr

Evritania

- Evritanika Nea

Fokida

- Empros Nafpaktou
- Ora tis Fokidas

Fthiotida

- Lamiakos Typos

Heraklion Crete

- Nea Kriti
- Patris

Imathia

- Imerisia
- Laos

Ioannina

- Anexartitos Typos
- Ipirotikos Agon
- Neoi Agones
- Proinos Logos

Karditsa

- Alithia
- Gnomi

Kastoria

- Odos

Kavala

- Xirafi

Kilkis

- Eidisis
- Proini

Kozani

- Chronos
- Proinos Logos
- Tharos

Laconia

- Lakonikos Tipos

Larissa

- Eleftheria

Lasithi

- Anatoli

Lesvos

- Dimokrtatis
- Empros

Magnisia

- Magnisia
- Taxydromos
- Thesslia

Messenia

- Eleftheria
- Tharos

Pieria

- Olympio Vima
- Politia Epta

Preveza

- Topiki Foni

Rhodes

- Rodiaki
- Dimokratiki

Rodopi

- Chronos
- Paratititis Thrakis
- Thrakiki Agora

Serres

- Simerini
- Kathimerinos Paratiritis

Thessaloniki

- Thessaloniki
- Typos Thessalonikis

Trikala

- Proinos Logos

Viotia

- Nea tis Viotias

Xanthi

- Agonas
- Embros
- Foni tis Xanthis

== Greek defunct newspapers ==
The following newspapers have terminated their printed versions. Some media groups have kept their titles active on-line.

=== General interest ===
24-Ores
Adesmeftos Typos
Aggelioforos Thessalonikis
Akropolis
Avriani (in Greek)
City Press
Documento (in Greek)
Eleftherotypia
Ethnos
Fileleftheros
Hora
Mesimvrini (in Greek)
Nea Selida
To Choni (in Greek)

=== Sports ===
Athltiki Icho (in Greek)
Derby
Gavros (in Greek)
Filathlos (in Greek)
Gata
Goal News
Prasini
Scorelive

=== Financial ===
Imerisia (in Greek)
Isotimia (in Greek)
Kerdos
Express (in Greek)

=== English ===
Athens News

== See also ==
- List of magazines in Greece
