= Metropolis of Patras =

Metropolitan see of the Church of Greece

Metropolis of Patras Μητρόπολη Πατρών

Location
- Ecclesiastical province: Greece
- Metropolitan: Chrysostomos Sklifas
- Subdivisions: Patras
- Coordinates: 38°14′33″N 21°43′41″E

Statistics
- Parishes: 189
- Churches: 89 (chapels)

Information
- Cathedral: St Andrew's Cathedral, Patras

Website
- Official website

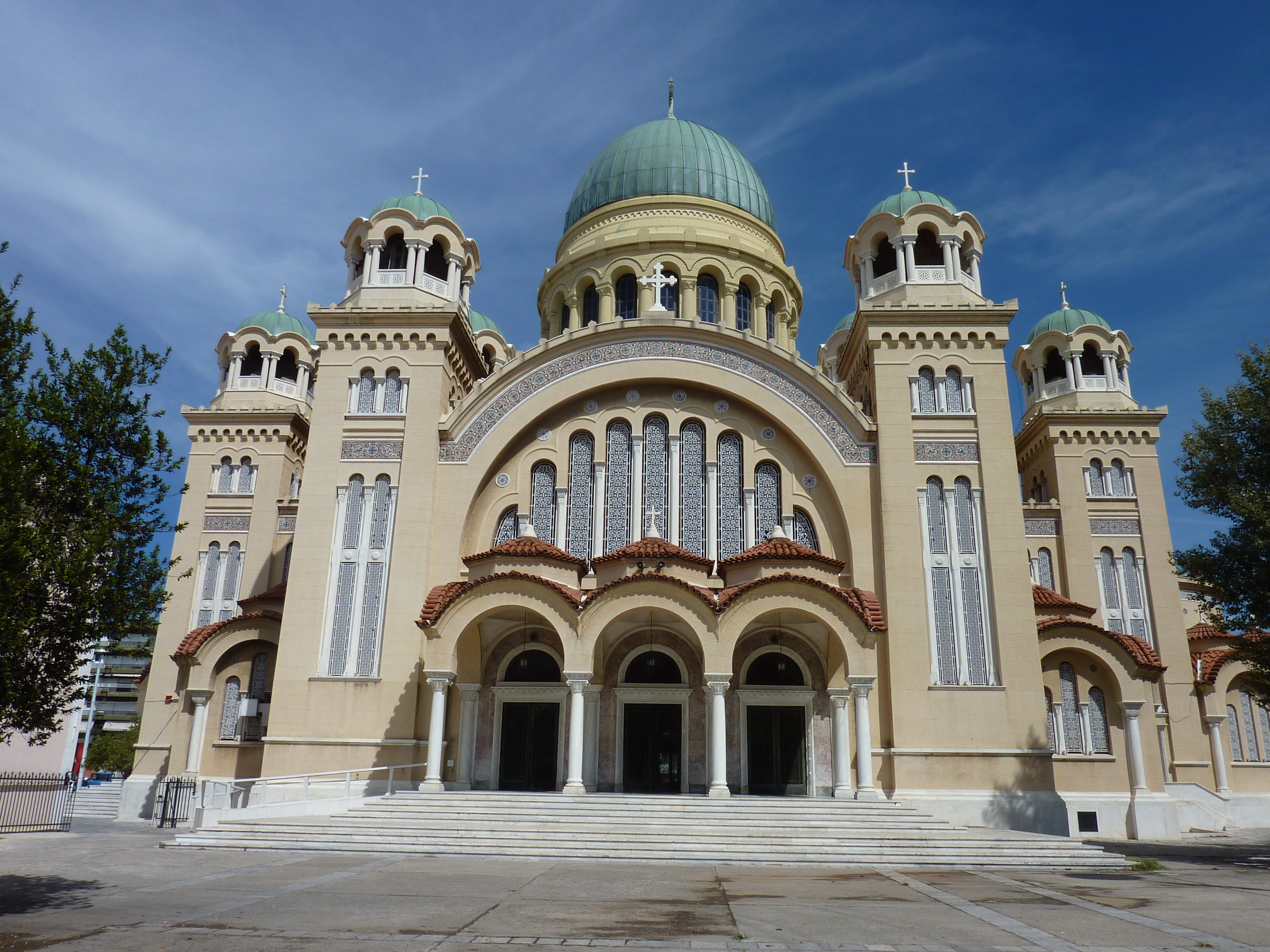
The cathedral of Saint Andrew

The Metropolis of Patras (Greek: Ιερά Μητρόπολις Πατρών) is a metropolitan see of the Church of Greece in the city of Patras in Achaea, Greece. The see traces its origins to its patron saint, Saint Andrew, in the 1st century. Historically, it has been one of the two pre-eminent sees of the Peloponnese along with the See of Corinth. The see has been part of the Greek Orthodox Church (the Patriarchate of Constantinople until 1833, the Church of Greece since then), except for the period where the city was part of the Principality of Achaea and a Latin see was installed.

== History ==
The see of Patras was founded, according to tradition, by Saint Andrew, who was crucified there. His relics are still kept in the metropolitan cathedral of Saint Andrew of Patras.

Until 733, Patras was subordinated to the See of Corinth, and under the jurisdiction of the Patriarchate of Rome. In that year, Emperor Leo III the Isaurian transferred all the sees of the Illyricum to the Patriarchate of Constantinople.

Patras was later raised to an archbishopric, which it remained until 806, when it became a metropolitan see. It had four suffragans; then five about 940; after 1453 it had only two, which successively disappeared.

A celebrated stylite lived there in the tenth century, to whom St. Luke the Younger went to be trained.

From 1180 until 1833, the see was officially termed "Metropolis of Old Patras" (Μητρόπολις Παλαιών Πατρών), to distinguish it from "New Patras", modern Ypati. Among the most prominent metropolitans of this period were the future Ecumenical Patriarchs of Constantinople Timothy II and Gabriel IV, as well as Germanos III, who played an important role in the Greek War of Independence.

== Latin see ==
In 1205, William of Champlitte took possession of the city of Patras and installed canons; they in turn elected Antelm of Cluny as archbishop. It had five suffragans, Andravida, Amyclæ, Modon, Coron, and Cephalonia-Zante; even when Modon and Coron belonged to the Venetians they continued to depend on Patras. The ecclesiastical territory included the barony of Patras, subject to the Aleman family and a vassal to the principality of Achaea.

In 1276, the archbishops acquired control over the barony of Patras, which henceforth became practically independent from the rest of the Principality. The Latin archbishops held the barony 1408, when they sold it to Venice. In 1429 it again fell into the power of the Greeks of the Despotate of the Morea, who restored the Orthodox see. Patras was taken by the Ottoman Turks in 1460.

The list of its Latin archbishops has been compiled by Le Quien, Heinrich Gelzer, Jules Pargoire. When Patras ceased to have residential Latin bishops, Latin titular bishops continued to be appointed. This practice ceased after the Second Vatican Council and no further appointments to the titular see have been made since the death in 1971 of the last bishop to hold the title.

In 1640, the Jesuits established themselves at Patras, and in 1687 the Franciscans and Carmelites. In the nineteenth century the pope confided the administration of the Peloponnese to the Bishop of Zakynthos, in 1834 to the Bishop of Syros.

== See also ==
- Parthenios IV of Old Patras
