= Paolo Foscari =

Venetian noble and churchman

Paolo Foscari was a Venetian noble and churchman, who rose to become Bishop of Castello in 1367–1375, and Latin Archbishop of Patras from 1375 until his death in 1393/4. In the latter capacity he played a leading role in the affairs of the Principality of Achaea.

== Biography ==
=== Early life and career ===
He was a son of Giovanni Foscari, a member of the noble Foscari family. Nothing is known about his early life, except that he studied civil and canon law in the University of Padua, where he may also have taught as a professor for a time.

He chose an ecclesiastical career, and on 19 August 1365 the Venetian Senate recommended him for the position of Latin Archbishop of Patras in the Morea in southern Greece. The Archbishop of Patras was a powerful figure in Latin Greece: he was not only the pre-eminent Catholic prelate of the Morea, but also, having acquired the secular barony of Patras in c. 1276 and added its 24 fiefs to the Archbishopric's eight, the most important territorial feudatory of the Principality of Achaea. From the time of Archbishop William Frangipani (1317–1337) in particular, the Archbishops of Patras enjoyed close relations with Venice and acted practically independent from the Prince. When the Angevin bailli tried to impose his authority over the city shortly after, the intervention of the Pope resulted in the effective independence of the archbishop from Achaea and his direct subordination to the Pope. For the remainder of the century, the Archbishops of Patras played an active role in the intrigues and feuds of the Principality, and in turn the contending families often tried to place one of their own scions on the archiepiscopal throne. Foscari lost the position to Angelo I Acciaioli, a relative of the previous incumbent, John III Acciaioli, and adoptive son of the grand seneschal Niccolò Acciaioli, whose family was spreading its influence in the Morea at this time.

On 24 April 1366, after another recommendation of the Senate to the Pope, he was chosen instead as bishop of the See of Coron, a Venetian colony in the southwestern Morea. He remained at Coron for about a year, before returning to Venice, where on 7 May 1367 he assumed the post of Bishop of Castello.

=== Bishop of Castello ===
As Bishop of Castello (in effect the residing bishop of Venice), he entered into a protracted conflict with the authorities of the Republic of Venice over the so-called "death tax", a tithe over a deceased person's property payable to the Church by his relatives. The controversy had been simmering since the outbreak of the Black Death in 1348, but Foscari fanned it anew. The civil authorities in Venice vehemently opposed the tithe, and forbade it outright on 29 August 1368, leading to a complete breakdown of relations between the Republic and the Church, as Popes Urban V and Gregory XI backed Foscari. An attempt by his father, Giovanni, to mediate between the two sides, only resulted in the Senate voting to give him an ultimatum of three months, under pain of perpetual banishment for him and his sons and the confiscation of all his property, to bring his son to heel. The conflict was only resolved in 1377, by which time Paolo Foscari had been transferred (on 26 November 1375) to the Archbishopric of Patras.

=== Archbishop of Patras ===
From his new post Paolo played a leading role in the affairs of the Latin states of southern Greece. In 1376 or 1377, the bailli of the Principality of Achaea, Centurione I Zaccaria, died, and Foscari was chosen to replace him by Queen Joanna I of Naples. He did not remain long in the post, however; desiring to place Achaea in hands more capable of defending it, in summer 1376 Queen Joanna sold the principality for five years to the Knights Hospitaller, and (at the latest in summer 1377) sent the Hospitaller Daniel del Caretto to the Morea as her new bailli, to oversee the transfer of power. The newly elected Grand Master of the Hospitallers, Juan Fernández de Heredia, arrived in the Morea in late 1377. Foscari lent him troops for an expedition against Lepanto, held by the Albanian chieftain John Spata; the campaign was a failure, however, as Heredia was taken prisoner by Spata, sold to the Turks, and had to be ransomed. By 1380, Lepanto too was back in Albanian hands, and in 1381, the Hospitallers returned the government of the Principality of Achaea to Queen Joanna.

The failure of the Hospitaller enterprise inaugurated a period of turmoil for Achaea, complicated by the arrival of the mercenary Navarrese Company and the effects of the Western Schism between Pope Urban VI and Antipope Clement VII. Queen Joanna having recognized Clement VII, she was deposed and killed by Charles III, who was supported by Urban VI. Achaea passed under the control of titular Latin Emperor James of Baux, who appointed the leader of the Navarrese Company, Mahiot de Coquerel, as his bailli. When James died in 1383, Mahiot recognized Charles III as suzerain. Foscari remained loyal to Urban VI; as a result, on 26 September 1384 he was declared deposed by Clement VII, however without any practical consequences to his position. In the same year, he was sent as papal envoy to reconcile the local Orthodox Church of Thessalonica, which was being besieged by the Ottoman Turks.

In early 1386, Charles III died, after having fallen out with Urban VI, who had declared him deposed. As a result, Urban VI confiscated the Principality of Achaea and on 6 September 1387, Foscari was appointed vicar-general on behalf of the Pope, and authorized to hire the Navarrese Company on his own account. The Pope envisioned to use the Navarrese to wage war on the Greeks of the Despotate of the Morea, and at the same stroke find for them employment and lands beyond those of the Principality of Achaea. In the event, the title was an empty formality, and real power in the principality remained with the Navarrese Company and its leaders. Foscari's role was more as an agent of Venice in the Morea, in whose affairs the Republic showed an ever-growing interest, and where they sought to expand their territory; thus in 1388, the Venetians acquired the lordship of Argos and Nauplia in the northeastern Morea. For this purpose, Foscari continued to receive soldiers and arms from Venice to support his position.

In the meantime, the pretenders to the Principality multiplied: Mary of Blois sold the Principality again to the Hospitallers on behalf of her son, Louis II of Anjou, but the sale was disputed by another rival, Amadeus of Piedmont, who succeeded in getting Clement VII to annul it. Amadeus made treaties with Venice, the Navarrese, the Greek Despot of the Morea, and Nerio I Acciaioli, but in the event, the death of his cousin Amadeus VI, Count of Savoy in 1391 meant that he never embarked for Greece. Likewise another pretender, Louis II, Duke of Bourbon, who might have rallied the Principality behind him, was caught up in the French expedition against the Barbary pirates in 1390 and abandoned his plans. The long interregnum lasted until 1396, when Mahiot's successor at the head of the Navarrese Company, Pedro de San Superano, received recognition as hereditary Prince of Achaea from King Ladislaus of Naples.

Throughout the period, Foscari continued to promote Venetian interests in the Morea: on 27 February 1393, a secret resolution of the Venetian Senate instructed Foscari to seek an alliance with Nerio Acciaioli and the Despot of the Morea, Theodore I Palaiologos, against the Navarrese Company. Foscari died sometime after that, but before 7 April 1394, when the See of Patras is reported as vacant.

== Sources ==
- Bon, Antoine (1969). La Morée franque. Recherches historiques, topographiques et archéologiques sur la principauté d'Achaïe [The Frankish Morea. Historical, Topographic and Archaeological Studies on the Principality of Achaea] (in French). Paris: De Boccard. OCLC 869621129.
- Ravegnani, Giorgio (1997). "FOSCARI, Paolo". Dizionario Biografico degli Italiani (in Italian). Vol. 49: Forino–Francesco da Serino. Rome: Istituto dell'Enciclopedia Italiana. ISBN 978-88-12-00032-6.
- Romano, Dennis (2007). The Likeness of Venice: A Life of Doge Francesco Foscari. Yale University Press. ISBN 978-0-300-11202-3.
- Topping, Peter (1975). "The Morea, 1364–1460". In Setton, Kenneth M.; Hazard, Harry W. (eds.). A History of the Crusades, Volume III: The Fourteenth and Fifteenth Centuries. Vol. 3. Madison and London: University of Wisconsin Press. pp. 141–166. ISBN 0-299-06670-3.

Catholic Church titles
Preceded by George	Latin Bishop of Coron; 1366–1367	Succeeded by Pietro Corner
Preceded by Nicholas Morosini	Bishop of Castello; 1367–1375	Succeeded by Giovanni Piacentini
Preceded by Giovanni Piacentini	Latin Archbishop of Patras; 1375–1393/4	Succeeded by Angelo II Acciaioli
