= Roger, Archbishop of Patras =

Roger was the Latin Archbishop of Patras and ruler of the Barony of Patras in Frankish Greece from 1337 until ca. 1347.

Roger succeeded William Frangipani on the latter's death in 1337. William, an energetic and capable man, had made the See of Patras effectively independent from the Principality of Achaea. Upon his death, and until Roger's arrival from Italy, the bailli of the Principality, Bertrand of Les Baux, laid siege to Patras hoping to reduce it to obedience. In the event, Pope Benedict XII reacted by declaring the city "land of the Holy Roman Church" and placed the Principality under the interdict. The mother and regent of the Prince, Catherine of Valois, arrived in the Principality herself and confirmed the independence of the Archbishop.

This independence was utilized by Roger and his successors, who henceforth played a crucial role in the internal feuds and plots of the Principality. Thus, faced with the repeatedly manifest inability of the Naples-based Angevin Princes to defend the interests of Achaea, in 1341 Roger participated along with other Achaean magnates in a conspiracy to offer control of the principality to John Kantakouzenos, the Byzantine regent; these plans were foiled, however, by the outbreak of the Byzantine civil war. A few years later, in October 1344, at the Council of Roviata Roger headed another group of powerful barons who requested from James III of Majorca, a descendant of the Villehardouin family that had founded the Principality of Achaea, to take over its governance. This appeal too came to nothing, as James was engaged in wars against the Aragonese and was killed in 1349.

== Sources ==
- Bon, Antoine (1969). La Morée franque. Recherches historiques, topographiques et archéologiques sur la principauté d'Achaïe [The Frankish Morea. Historical, Topographic and Archaeological Studies on the Principality of Achaea] (in French). Paris: De Boccard. OCLC 869621129.
- Topping, Peter (1975). "The Morea, 1311–1364". In Setton, Kenneth M.; Hazard, Harry W. (eds.). A History of the Crusades, Volume III: The Fourteenth and Fifteenth Centuries. Vol. 3. Madison and London: University of Wisconsin Press. pp. 104–140. ISBN 0-299-06670-3.

Preceded by William Frangipani	Latin Archbishop of Patras; 1337–1347	Succeeded by Nicholas da Canale
