= Odo de Novelles =

Mercenary leader

- Other name: Iot de Novelles
- Military career
- Unit: Catalan Company

Odo de Novelles (also known as Iot de Novelles, Odo de Novellis, Oddonem de Novellis, Otus de Novelles and Odon Novello) was one of the leaders of the Catalan Company in Medieval Greece, after the death of Roger de Flor. In 1320 he married the daughter of a local lord in Demetrias, Thessaly known as 'Missili' (Stefanos Gabrieloupulos Melissenos). In 1335, as marshal of the Catalan Company he was excommunicated by archbishop William Frangipani, along with the other leaders of the company.
