= Stephen Teglatius =

Roman Catholic archbishop, speaker and theologian

Stefano Taleazzi
- Archdiocese: Archbishop of Bar (1473 - 1485), Titular Archbishop of Patras (? - 1515), Archbishop of Bishop of Torcello (1485 - 1515)

Personal details
- Born: Stefano Taleazzi; 1445 Republic of Venice
- Died: 1515 (aged 69–70) Rome
- Occupation: Catholic archbishop, speaker, theologian
- Coat of arms

Stephen Teglatius (Theglatius, de Taleazis; Italian: Stefano Taleazzi, Serbian: Stefan Teglatije) served as an Archbishop of Bar in the late 15th century. He is notable for contemporary treatises illuminating the continued commitment to the idea of the crusade and the issues with their organisation during this period.

== Biography ==
There is little information of his early years but it is probable that he left the Republic of Venice for Rome following Cardinal Pietro Barbo or after the latter's election as pope and lived in the city during the pontificates of Sixtus IV and Innocent VIII. His first recorded mention was his appointment as Archbishop of Bar, then under Venetian control, in November 1473 by Sixtus IV. He later held the title of Archbishop of Patras in partibus infidelium. In September 1485, Innocent VIII created him bishop of Torcello.

From 1480, he was a member of the Curia as a pontifical orator despite frequently residing in Torcello and Venice. He was papal chaplain to Alexander VI from 1486, undertaking diplomatic duties in Venice on behalf of the pope concerning the recovery of stolen ecclesiastical property, the collection of rents or the conclusion of a papal agreement with the Venetians limiting Borgia ambitions on the Adriatic. Under Julius II he continued to live in Rome, in a house in Pigna where he kept a small collection of ancient manuscripts.

In early 1509, he was allowed to return home before the pope joined the League of Cambrai. It is unclear what part he played during following war. In October 1509, he was briefly excommunicated for failing to pay 300 ducats to Valerio Dolce in opposition to the pope's orders. In February 1510, shortly before the interdict on Venice was lifted, he dedicated the edition of the Brevis et perutilis expositio in Cantica canticorum to the doge Leonardo Loredan; it is a commentary on the Cantico dei cantici or "Song of Songs" in which Jesus is represented in a discussion with the church that follows the work of Saint Bruno (bishop of Segni).

He returned to Rome to assist Julius II at the Fifth Council of the Lateran that opened in May 1512. In the autumn of the following year, the Cardinal Lorenzo Pucci commissioned a treatise on the reform of the Church. Further treatises were dedicated to the pope in support of the war against the Turks. In May 1515, he delivered another unsuccessful sermon against the Turks to open the tenth session of the Council. Returning to Venice, he died in the summer of the same year. In addition to the works mentioned, he also wrote a treatises on hypocrisy and ten books entitled De praestantia christianae fidei ac praeeminentia apostolicae sedis that do not survive.

It is believed that during his tenure as Archbishop of Antivari, he was the first that began carrying the title "totius serviae primas" (Primate of Serbia) - Philip Gaius, Teglatius' successor, is considered to be the first official Archbishop of Antivari carrying the title.

== Episcopal succession ==
While bishop, he was the principal consecrator of:

- Nicola di Gaeta, Archbishop of Naxos (1479);
- Jan Strzelecki, Archbishop of Lviv (1481);
- Donato de Georgiis, Bishop of Trebinje e Mrkan (1482);
- Uilliam Ó Fearghail. Bishop of Ardagh (1482);
- Erasmus Perchinger, Auxiliary Bishop of Freising (1482);
- Johann Spenner, Auxiliary Bishop of Köln (1482);
- Johann von Eindhoven, Auxiliary Bishop of Trier (1483); and
- Francesco de Noya, Bishop of Cefalù (1485);

and the principal co-consecrator of:

- John O'Hedian, Bishop of Ossory (1479); and
- Johann Schlecht, Auxiliary Bishop of Regensburg (1481).

Catholic Church titles
Preceded by Šimun Vosić	Archbishop of Bar; 1473 - 1485	Succeeded by Philip Gaius
Preceded by Battista dei Giudici	Titular Archbishop of Patras ? - 1515	Succeeded by Antonio Marcello
Preceded by Girolamo Porcia	Bishop of Torcello; 1485 - 1515	Succeeded by Simeone Contarini

== Bibliography ==
- Bird, Jessalynn (2006). "Alexander VI". In Murray, Alan V. (ed.). The Crusades: An Encyclopedia. Vol. I:A-C. ABC-CLIO. pp. 41–42. ISBN 1-57607-862-0.
- Cheney, David M. "Diocese of Torcello (Turris)". Catholic-Hierarchy.org. (for Chronology of Bishops) ^{[self-published]}
- Chow, Gabriel. "Titular Episcopal See of Torcello (Italy)". GCatholic.org. (for Chronology of Bishops) ^{[self-published]}
- Michele Lodone (2019). "Taleazzi, Stefano". Dizionario Biografico degli Italiani (in Italian). Vol. 94: Stampa–Tarantelli. Rome: Istituto dell'Enciclopedia Italiana. ISBN 978-88-12-00032-6.
