= Šimun Vosić =

Slovenian Roman Catholic prelate

Most Reverend Šimun Vosić
- Archbishop (Personal Title) of Capodistria and Titular Archbishop of Patrae
- Church: Catholic Church
- Diocese: Diocese of Capodistria
- In office: 1473–1482
- Predecessor: Pietro Bagnacavallo
- Successor: Jacques Valaresso
- Previous post: Archbishop of Bar (1461–1473)

Personal details
- Died: August 1482 Capodistria, Slovenia

Šimun Vosić (also Simone Vossich) (died August 1482) was a Roman Catholic prelate who served as Archbishop (Personal Title) of Capodistria (1473–1482), Titular Archbishop of Patrae (1473–1482), and Archbishop of Bar (1461–1473).

== Biography ==
On 26 October 1461, he was appointed during the papacy of Pope Pius II as Archbishop of Bar. On 26 November 1473, he was appointed during the papacy of Pope Sixtus IV as Archbishop (Personal Title) of Capodistria and Titular Archbishop of Patrae. He served as Archbishop of Capodistria until his death in August 1482.

== Episcopal succession ==
Episcopal succession of Šimun Vosić

While bishop, he was the principal consecrator of:

- Blasius Vramay, Bishop of Lezhë (1467);
- Juan Diaz de Coca, Bishop of Oviedo (1468);
- Nicola Barrault, Archbishop of Durrës (1469);
- Guillaume Olivieri, Bishop of Alet (1469);
- Thaddeus Morisey, Bishop of Down and Connor (1469);
- Thomas Arthur (bishop), Bishop of Limerick (1469);
- Jacob Ulfsson, Archbishop of Uppsala (1470);
- Benedetto Martiali, Titular Bishop of Nicopolis ad Iaterum (1471);
- Pierre von Wedberch, Bishop of Ösell (1471);
- Burchard Tuberflug, Titular Bishop of Sebaste in Cilicia and Auxiliary Bishop of Konstanz (1471);
- Hermann Molitoris, Titular Bishop of Salmasa and Auxiliary Bishop of Halberstadt (1472);
- Garcis Menezes, Bishop of Évora (1472);
- James Goldwell, Bishop of Norwich (1472);
- Diego de Moiras, Bishop of Tui (1473);
- Albert Schönhofer, Titular Bishop of Salona and Auxiliary Bishop of Passau (1473);
- Daniel Zehender, Titular Bishop of Belline and Auxiliary Bishop of Konstanz (1473);
- Agostino Bishop of Santorini (1477);
- Marino Fregeno, Bishop of Kammin (1479);
- Giovanni Ducco, Bishop of Coron (1479); and
- Johann Schlecht, Titular Bishop of Hierapolis in Phrygia and Auxiliary Bishop of Regensburg (1481).

Catholic Church titles
Preceded by André da Mule	Archbishop of Bar; 1461–1473	Succeeded by Stefan Teglatije
Preceded by	Titular Archbishop of Patrae; 1473–1482	Succeeded by Jean Battista de Judicibus
Preceded by Pietro Bagnacavallo	Archbishop (Personal Title) of Capodistria; 1473–1482	Succeeded by Jacques Valaresso
