= Johann von Eindhoven =

German prelate (1439–1509)

Most Reverend Johann von Eindhoven
- Auxiliary Bishop Emeritus of Trier; Titular Bishop of Azotus
- Church: Catholic Church
- Diocese: Diocese of Trier
- In office: 1483–1508

Orders
- Consecration: 1 Jun 1483 by Stefan Teglatije

Personal details
- Born: 1439
- Died: 7 Oct 1509 (age 70) Trier, Germany

Johann von Eindhoven, C.R.S.A. (1439–7 October 1509) was a Roman Catholic prelate who served as Auxiliary Bishop of Trier (1483–1508).

== Biography ==
Johann von Eindhoven was born in 1439 and ordained a priest in the Canons Regular of Saint Augustine. On 27 February 1483, he was appointed during the papacy of Pope Sixtus IV as Auxiliary Bishop of Trier and Titular Bishop of Azotus. On 1 June 1483, he was consecrated bishop by Stefan Teglatije, Archbishop of Bar, with Genesius, Titular Archbishop of Mitylene serving as co-consecrator. He served as Auxiliary Bishop of Trier until his resignation on 3 January 1508. He died on 7 October 1509.
