= Johann Spenner =

German Roman Catholic prelate

Most Reverend Johann Spenner
- Auxiliary Bishop of Cologne; Titular Bishop of Cyrene
- Church: Catholic Church
- Archdiocese: Archdiocese of Cologne
- In office: 1482–1503

Orders
- Consecration: 18 November 1482 by Stefan Teglatije

Personal details
- Died: 5 December 1503 Cologne, Germany

Johann Spenner also Johann Spender (died 5 December 1503) was a Roman Catholic prelate who served as Auxiliary Bishop of Cologne (1482–1503).

== Biography ==
Johann Spenner was appointed a priest in the Order of Friars Minor. On 4 November 1482, he was appointed during the papacy of Pope Sixtus IV as Auxiliary Bishop of Cologne and Titular Bishop of Cyrene. On 18 November 1482, he was consecrated bishop by Stefan Teglatije, Archbishop of Bar, with Giuliano Maffei, Bishop of Bertinoro, serving as co-consecrator. He served as Auxiliary Bishop of Cologne until his death on 5 December 1503.

== External links and additional sources ==
- Cheney, David M. "Cyrene (Titular See)". Catholic-Hierarchy.org. (for Chronology of Bishops) ^{[self-published]}
- Chow, Gabriel. "Titular Episcopal See of Cyrene (Libya)". GCatholic.org. (for Chronology of Bishops) ^{[self-published]}
- Cheney, David M. "Archdiocese of Köln {Cologne}". Catholic-Hierarchy.org. (for Chronology of Bishops) ^{[self-published]}
- Chow, Gabriel. "Metropolitan Archdiocese of Köln (Germany)". GCatholic.org. (for Chronology of Bishops) ^{[self-published]}
