= Bartolomeo Lopaci =

Most Reverend Bartolomeo Lopaci
- Bishop of Coron
- Church: Catholic Church
- Diocese: Diocese of Coron
- In office: 1449–1457
- Successor: Giovanni Ducco
- Previous post: Bishop of Cortona (1439–1449)

Bartolomeo Lopaci, O.P. was a Roman Catholic prelate who served as Bishop of Coron (1449–1457) and Bishop of Cortona (1439–1449).

== Biography ==
Bartolomeo Lopaci was ordained a priest in the Order of Preachers. On 23 September 1439, he was appointed during the papacy of Pope Eugene IV as Bishop of Cortona. On 27 June 1449, he was appointed during the papacy of Pope Nicholas V as Bishop of Coron. He served as Bishop of Coron until his resignation in 1457. While bishop, he was the principal co-consecrator of Antonio de Pago, Bishop of Ossero.

== External links and additional sources ==
- Cheney, David M. "Diocese of Cortona". Catholic-Hierarchy.org. (for Chronology of Bishops) ^{[self-published]}
- Chow, Gabriel. "Diocese of Cortona (Italy)". GCatholic.org. (for Chronology of Bishops) ^{[self-published]}

Catholic Church titles
Preceded by	Bishop of Cortona; 1439–1449	Succeeded by Mariano Salvini
Preceded by	Bishop of Coron; 1449–1457	Succeeded by Giovanni Ducco
