= Giovanni Ducco =

Most Reverend Giovanni Ducco
- Bishop of Coron
- Church: Catholic Church
- Diocese: Diocese of Coron
- In office: 1479–1496
- Predecessor: Bartolomeo Lopaci

Orders
- Consecration: 5 September 1479 by Šimun Vosić

Personal details
- Born: 15th century Pontevico
- Died: 21 January 1496 Brescia

Giovanni Ducco (Pontevico, 15th century - Brescia, 21 January 1496) was a Roman Catholic prelate who served as Bishop of Coron (1479–1496).

== Biography ==
On 7 June 1479, Giovanni Ducco was appointed during the papacy of Pope Sixtus IV as Bishop of Coron. On 5 September 1479, he was consecrated bishop by Šimun Vosić, Titular Archbishop of Patrae, with Ardicino della Porta, Bishop of Aleria, and Giorgio della Rovere, Bishop of Orvieto, serving as co-consecrators He served as Bishop of Coron until his death on 21 January 1496.

Catholic Church titles
| Preceded by Bartolomeo Lopaci | Bishop of Coron; 1479–1496 | Succeeded by |
