= Albert Schönhofer =

German catholic priest and canon

Most Reverend Albert Schönhofer
- Auxiliary Bishop of Passau; Titular Bishop of Salona
- Church: Catholic Church
- Diocese: Diocese of Passau
- In office: 1473–1493

Orders
- Consecration: 30 May 1473 by Šimun Vosić

Personal details
- Died: 7 July 1493 Passau, Germany

Albert Schönhofer (died 1493) was a Roman Catholic prelate who served as Auxiliary Bishop of Passau (1473–1493).

== Biography ==
On 17 May 1473, Albert Schönhofer was appointed during the papacy of Pope Sixtus IV as Auxiliary Bishop of Passau and Titular Bishop of Salona. On 30 May 1473, he was consecrated bishop by Šimun Vosić, Archbishop of Bar, with Alfonso de Paradinas, Bishop of Ciudad Rodrigo, and Gabriele Maccafani, Bishop of Marsi, serving as co-consecrators. He served as Auxiliary Bishop of Passau until his death on 7 July 1493.

== External links and additional sources ==
- Cheney, David M. "Salona (Titular See)". Catholic-Hierarchy.org. (for Chronology of Bishops) ^{[self-published]}
- Chow, Gabriel. "Titular Episcopal See of Salona (Italy)". GCatholic.org. (for Chronology of Bishops) ^{[self-published]}
