= Daniel Zehender =

German Roman Catholic prelate

Most Reverend Daniel Zehender
- Auxiliary Bishop of Konstanz; Titular Bishop of Belline
- Church: Catholic Church
- Diocese: Diocese of Konstanz
- In office: 1473–1500
- Predecessor: Burchard Tuberflug
- Successor: Balthasar Brennwald

Orders
- Consecration: 19 December 1473 by Šimun Vosić

Personal details
- Died: 15 September 1500 Konstanz, Germany

Daniel Zehender (died 15 September 1500) was a Roman Catholic prelate who served as Bishop of Konstanz (1473–1500).

== Biography ==
Daniel Zehender was ordained a priest in the Order of Friars Minor. On 3 December 1473 he was appointed during the papacy of Pope Sixtus IV as Auxiliary Bishop of Konstanz and Titular Bishop of Belline. On 19 December 1473 he was consecrated bishop by Šimun Vosić, Bishop of Capodistria, with Giacomo, Bishop of Sant'Angelo dei Lombardi, serving as co-consecrators. He served as Auxiliary Bishop of Konstanz until his death on 15 September 1500. While bishop, he was the principal co-consecrator of Gaspard de Reno, Bishop of Basel (1479), and of Friedrich von Hohenzollern, Bishop of Augsburg (1486).

Catholic Church titles
Preceded by Burchard Tuberflug	Auxiliary Bishop of Konstanz; 1473–1500	Succeeded by Balthasar Brennwald
