= Burchard Tuberflug =

German Roman Catholic prelate

Most Reverend Burchard Tuberflug
- Auxiliary Bishop of Konstanz; Titular Bishop of Sebaste in Cilicia
- Church: Catholic Church
- Diocese: Diocese of Konstanz
- In office: 1471–?
- Successor: Daniel Zehender

Burchard Tuberflug, O.P. was a Roman Catholic prelate who served as Auxiliary Bishop of Konstanz (1471–?).

== Biography ==
Burchard Tuberflug was ordained a priest in the Order of Preachers. On 18 September 1471, he was appointed during the papacy of Pope Sixtus IV as Auxiliary Bishop of Konstanz and Titular Bishop of Sebaste in Cilicia. On 22 September 1471, he was consecrated bishop by Šimun Vosić, Archbishop of Bar, with Benedictus, Titular Archbishop of Mitylene, and Giacomo, Bishop of Sant'Angelo dei Lombardi, serving as co-consecrators. It is uncertain how long he served; the next auxiliary bishop of record in the diocese was Daniel Zehender appointed in 1473.

Catholic Church titles
| Preceded by | Auxiliary Bishop of Konstanz; 1471–? | Succeeded by Daniel Zehender |
