= Erasmus Perchinger =

German Roman Catholic prelate

Most Reverend Erasmus Perchinger
- Auxiliary Bishop of Freising; Titular Bishop of Saldae
- Church: Catholic Church
- Diocese: Diocese of Freising
- In office: 1482–1483

Orders
- Consecration: 18 November 1482 by Stefan Teglatije

Personal details
- Died: 26 September 1483 Freising, Germany

Erasmus Perchinger, O.F.M. (died 26 September 1483) was a Roman Catholic prelate who served as Auxiliary Bishop of Freising (1482–1483).

== Biography ==
Erasmus Perchinger was ordained a priest in the Order of Friars Minor. On 6 November 1482, during the papacy of Pope Sixtus IV, he was appointed Auxiliary Bishop of Freising and Titular Bishop of Saldae. He was consecrated bishop on 18 November 1482 by Stefan Teglatije, Archbishop of Bar, with Giuliano Maffei, Bishop of Bertinoro, serving as co-consecrator. He served as Auxiliary Bishop of Freising until his death on 26 September 1483.
