= Giuliano Maffei =

Archbishop of Dubrovnik from 1505 to 1510

Most Reverend Giuliano Maffei
- Archbishop of Dubrovnik
- Church: Catholic Church
- Archdiocese: Archdiocese of Dubrovnik
- In office: 1505–1510
- Predecessor: Giovanni Sacco (archbishop)
- Successor: Rinaldo Graziani

Personal details
- Died: 1510 Dubrovnik

Giuliano Maffei, O.F.M. or Giuliano Matteis (died 1510) was a Roman Catholic prelate who served as Archbishop of Dubrovnik (1505–1510) and Bishop of Bertinoro (1477–1505).

== Biography ==
Giuliano Maffei was ordained a priest in the Order of Friars Minor. On 24 Jan 1477, he was appointed during the papacy of Pope Sixtus IV as Bishop of Bertinoro. On 18 Apr 1505, he was appointed during the papacy of Pope Julius II as Archbishop of Dubrovnik. He served as Archbishop of Dubrovnik until his death in 1510.

== Episcopal succession ==
Episcopal succession of Giuliano Maffei

While bishop, he was the principal consecrator of:

- Odon Ozic, Bishop of Vaison (1482);

and the principal co-consecrator of:

- Astorgius Almarici, Bishop of Saint-Paul-Trois-Châteaux (1478);
- Guido Gaufridi, Titular Bishop of Troja (1478);
- Jan Strzelecki, Archbishop of Lviv (1481);
- Gabriel de Franchis, Bishop of Ajaccio (1482);
- Erasmus Perchinger, Auxiliary Bishop of Freising and Titular Bishop of Saldae (1482);
- Johann Spenner, Auxiliary Bishop of Köln and Titular Bishop of Cyrene (1482);
- Pierre Carré, Bishop of Orange (1484);
- Heinrich Kratz, Auxiliary Bishop of Naumburg and Titular Bishop of Callipolis (1484);
- Balthasar Brennwald, Auxiliary Bishop of Chur and Titular Bishop of Troja (1491); and
- Pedro Gamboa, Coadjutor Bishop of Carinola (1498).

== External links and additional sources ==
- Cheney, David M. "Diocese of Bertinoro". Catholic-Hierarchy.org. (for Chronology of Bishops) ^{[self-published]}
- Chow, Gabriel. "Diocese of Bertinoro (Italy)". GCatholic.org. (for Chronology of Bishops) ^{[self-published]}
- Cheney, David M. "Diocese of Dubrovnik (Ragusa)". Catholic-Hierarchy.org. (for Chronology of Bishops) ^{[self-published]}
- Chow, Gabriel. "Diocese of Dubrovnik (Croatia)". GCatholic.org. (for Chronology of Bishops) ^{[self-published]}

Catholic Church titles
Preceded by Ventura degli Abbati	Bishop of Bertinoro; 1477–1505	Succeeded by Giovanni Ruffo de Theodoli
Preceded by Giovanni Sacco (archbishop)	Archbishop of Dubrovnik; 1505–1510	Succeeded by Rinaldo Graziani
