= Benedetto Martiali =

Most Reverend Benedetto Martiali
- Titular Bishop of Nicopolis ad Iaterum
- Church: Catholic Church
- In office: 1471–?
- Predecessor: Vilem Kolina
- Successor: André Byssmann

Orders
- Consecration: 28 April 1471 by Šimun Vosić

Benedetto Martiali was a Roman Catholic prelate who served as Titular Bishop of Nicopolis ad Iaterum (1471–?).

== Biography ==
On 3 April 1471, Benedetto Martiali was appointed during the papacy of Pope Paul II as Titular Bishop of Nicopolis ad Iaterum. On 28 April 1471, he was consecrated bishop by Šimun Vosić, Archbishop of Bar, with Giovanni Battista Cibò, Bishop of Savona, and Thomas Ghisleri, Bishop of Jesi, serving as co-consecrators. It is uncertain how long he served as Titular Bishop of Nicopolis ad Iaterum; the next bishop of record is André Byssmann who was appointed in 1482.

Catholic Church titles
Preceded by Vilem Kolina	Titular Bishop of Nicopolis ad Iaterum; 1471–?	Succeeded by André Byssmann
