= Parthenios IV of Old Patras =

Parthenios IV of Old Patras (Greek: Παλαιών Πατρών Παρθένιος Δ΄, 1720–1786) was a Greek hierarch having twice served as metropolitan of Old Patras. He took an active part in the Orlovian revolution, after the unfortunate outcome of which he escaped on a Russian ship to Russia.

== Biography ==
He was born in Ioannina in 1720 and served as the Metropolitan of Old Patras during the periods of 1750 to 1756 and 1759 to 1770, succeeding Gerasimos the Theraeus both times. He was highly educated and an expert in the Ancient Greek language.

In 1766, he built the Church of Faneromeni in Aigio. During the Orlov Revolt, while in Aigio, he raised the flag of the revolution, expelled the Ottomans from the city, and then campaigned against Kalavryta. The abbot of Mega Spilaio, carrying a cross and accompanied by monks, managed to break the siege of the city. They entered the city, rescued the Turkish families along with their sacred relics, and safely transported them to the Gulf of Crissia or the Gulf of Itea. For this assistance, the Sultan honored Mega Spilaio by granting it a permanent guard of honor from Albanians, and Kalavryta faced no adverse consequences.

After the failure of the revolution, Parthenios fled first to Zakynthos under the protection of the Russian fleet and later to Saint Petersburg, where he sought refuge at the court of Catherine the Great. The Tsarina granted him some land for his livelihood, as he could not return to his position due to his deposition.

He died in 1786 and was buried in the Donskoy Monastery in Moscow, where his tomb still exists today.

== Sources ==
- Στέφανος Θωμόπουλος, Ιστορία της πόλεως των Πατρών, Τόμος Α΄, έκδοση τέταρτη, Αχαϊκές εκδόσεις 1998, ISBN 960-7960-10-6.
- Κ. Σάθας "Τουρκοκρατούμενη Ελλάδα - Ιστορία των Ελλήνων από την Άλωση ως το 21" τομ.4 Εκδ. Νέα Σύνορα - Α. Α. Λιβάνη Αθήνα 1995, τ.4ος, σ. 12.
- Μιχαήλ Β. Σακελλαρίου, Η Πελοπόννησος κατά την δεύτερην Τουρκοκρατίαν (1715–1821), Αθήνα 1939, επανέκδοση 2000.
- Κώστας Τριανταφύλλου, Ιστορικόν λεξικόν των Πατρών, Πάτρα 1995, 3η έκδοση.
