= Guido Gaufridi =

Most Reverend Guido Gaufridi
- Titular Bishop of Troja
- Church: Catholic Church
- In office: 1478–1491
- Successor: Balthasar Brennwald

Orders
- Consecration: 6 September 1478 by Alfonso de Paradinas

Guido Gaufridi (died 1491) was a Roman Catholic prelate who served as Titular Bishop of Troja (1478–1491).

== Biography ==
On 4 August 1478, Guido Gaufridi was appointed during the papacy of Pope Sixtus IV as Titular Bishop of Troja. On 6 September 1478, he was consecrated bishop by Alfonso de Paradinas, Bishop of Ciudad Rodrigo, with Giuliano Maffei, Bishop of Bertinoro, serving as co-consecrator. He served as Titular Bishop of Troja until his death in 1491.

Catholic Church titles
Preceded by	Titular Bishop of Troja; 1478–1491	Succeeded by Balthasar Brennwald
