= Johann Schlecht =

German Roman Catholic prelate

Most Reverend Johann Schlecht
- Auxiliary Bishop of Regensburg; Titular Bishop of Hierapolis in Phrygia
- Church: Catholic Church
- Diocese: Diocese of Regensburg
- In office: 1481–1500

Orders
- Consecration: 23 September 1481 by Šimun Vosić

Personal details
- Died: 31 July 1500 Regensburg, Germany

Johann Schlecht, O.S.A. (died 1500) was a Roman Catholic prelate who served as Auxiliary Bishop of Regensburg (1481–1500) and Titular Bishop of Hierapolis in Phrygia. (1481–1500)

== Biography ==
Johann Schlecht was ordained a priest in the Order of Saint Augustine. On 10 September 1481, he was appointed during the papacy of Pope Sixtus IV as Auxiliary Bishop of Regensburg and Titular Bishop of Hierapolis in Phrygia. On 23 September 1481, he was consecrated bishop by Šimun Vosić, Bishop of Capodistria, with Stefan Teglatije, Archbishop of Bar, and Orlando, Titular Bishop of Antarados, serving as co-consecrators. He served as Auxiliary Bishop of Regensburg until his death on 31 July 1500.

While bishop, he was the principal co-consecrator of Gabriel von Eyb, Bishop of Eichstätt (1497), and Kaspar Tobritsch, Auxiliary Bishop of Eichstätt and Titular Bishop of Microcomien (1498).

== See also ==
- Catholic Church in Germany
