= Latin Archbishopric of Patras =

Former Latin Catholic jurisdiction in Greece

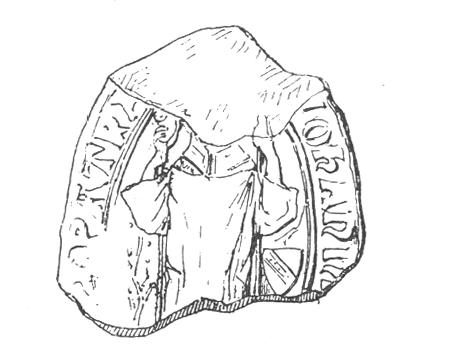
Seal of John I, Archbishop of Patras, 1295–1306

The Latin Archbishopric of Patras was the see of Patras in the period in which its incumbents belonged to the Latin Church. This period began in 1205 with the installation in the see of a Catholic archbishop following the Fourth Crusade.

The Latin archbishop was the senior-most of the seven ecclesiastic barons of the Principality of Achaea, which comprised the entire Peloponnese. From the late 13th century, the archbishops also purchased the secular Barony of Patras from its holders, becoming the most important vassals of the entire principality. It had five suffragans, Andravida, Amyclae, Modon, Coron, and Cephalonia-Zante.

The archbishopric survived as a Latin residential see until 1430, when the city of Patras fell to the Byzantine Greeks of the Despotate of the Morea. From 1475 on, Latin archbishops continued to be appointed, but for them the bishopric was only a titular see. It continues to be included in the Catholic Church's list of such sees, but since the Second Vatican Council no new appointments of Catholic bishops of the see have been made.

== Residential archbishops ==
Name	Tenure	Notes
Antelm of Cluny	1205 – ca. 1241	
Bernard	8 October 1243 – ?	
?	before 1246 – after 1252	
Godfrey	9 December 1253 – after 1255	
J.	27 November 1263 – ?	
Benedict of Alatri	2 June 1273 – ?	
John I	7 October 1295 – ?	
John II Colonna	8 January 1306 – ?	
James	28 April 1307 – ?	
Raynier	30 July 1308 – ?	
William Frangipani	3 January 1317 – 1337	
Roger	20 October 1337 – 1347	
Nicholas da Canale	23 May 1347 – 1351	
Reginald de Laura	4 January 1351 – 1357	
Raymond	20 December 1357 – ?	
John III Acciaioli	20 May 1360 – ?	
Bongiovanni	5 April 1363 – July 1363	
Bartolomeo Papazzuri	21 July 1363 – ?	
Angelo I Acciaioli	12 December 1365 – ?	
Paul	20 October 1367 – 1369 or 1370	Latin Patriarch of Constantinople, apostolic administrator of Patras
John IV de Novacchio	1369 or 1370 – 1371	
John V Piacentini	28 October 1371 – 27 November 1375	
Paolo Foscari	27 November 1375 – ca. 1394	
Angelo II Acciaioli	ca. 1395 – ?	
Stephen Zaccaria	20 April 1405 – ?	
Pandolfo Malatesta	10 May 1424 – 1430	deinde in Pesaro till his death †1441

== Titular holders ==
Name	Tenure	Notes
Šimun Vosić (Simone Vosich)	1475 – 1482	
Battista dei Giudici	1484	
Stefan Teglatije	5 September 1485 – 1514	
Antonio Marcello	21 May 1520 – 6 September 1521	
Antonio Cocco	29 May 1560 – ?	
Alessandro Piccolomini	28 July 1574 – ?	
Antonio Marcello	21 May 1520 – 6 September 1521	
Giovanni Francesco Guidi di Bagno	3 March 1614 – 24 July 1641	
Ciriaco Rocci	29. May 1628 – 25 September 1651	
Girolamo Farnese	11 April 1639 – 6 May 1658	
Ottaviano Carafa	1660 – 1666	
Giacinto Solaro di Moretta	23 January 1668 – 1672	
Fabrizio Spada	8 August 1672 – 23 March 1676	
Sinibaldo Doria	18 December 1711 – 21 May 1731	
Fabrizio Serbelloni	6 August 1731 – 22 July 1754	
Johann Philipp von Walderdorf	16 September 1754 – 18 January 1756	
Francesco Carafa della Spina di Traetto	28 January 1760 – 26 April 1773	
Carlo Crivelli	11 September 1775 – 29 March 1802	
Paolo Filipponi	6 April 1818 – 1819	
Celestino Maria Cocle	30 September 1821 – 3 March 1857	
Filippo Gallo	18 March 1858 – 1891	
Giuseppe Maria Costantini	1 June 1891 – 9 January 1900	
Donato Velluti Zati di San Clemente	15 April 1907 – 11 December 1927	
Andrea Giacinto Longhin	4 October 1928 – 26 June 1936	
Luigi Fogar	30 October 1936 – 26 August 1971	

== Sources ==
- Gerland, Ernst (1903). Neue Quellen zur Geschichte des lateinischen Erzbistmus Patras (in German). Leipzig: B. G. Teubner.
