= Hermann Molitoris =

German bishop

Most Reverend Hermann Molitori
- Auxiliary Bishop of Halberstadt; Titular Bishop of Salmasa
- Church: Catholic Church
- Diocese: Diocese of Halberstadt
- In office: 1471–1483

Personal details
- Died: 1483 Halberstadt, Germany

Hermann Molitori, O.P. was a Roman Catholic prelate who served as Auxiliary Bishop of Halberstadt (1471–1483).

== Biography ==
Hermann Molitor was ordained a priest in the Order of Preachers. On 22 November 1471, he was appointed during the papacy of Pope Sixtus IV as Auxiliary Bishop of Halberstadt and Titular Bishop of Salmasa. On 2 February 1472, he was consecrated bishop by Šimun Vosić, Archbishop of Bar, with Antonio de Alcala, Bishop of Ampurias, and Antonio, Bishop of Civita Castellana e Orte, serving as co-consecrators. He served as Auxiliary Bishop of Halberstadt until his death in 1483.
