= Bertrand of Les Baux =

12th century Lord of Courthézon

Bertrand of Les Baux (French: Bertrand des Baux) was Lord of Courthézon in the Provence.

From July 1336 he was named Marshal of the Principality of Achaea, bailli and vicar-general of Achaea, Cephalonia, and Lepanto on behalf of Catherine of Valois, ruling until Catherine's arrival at the principality and the assumption of direct governance in summer 1338. His tenure was marked by a violent conflict with the Latin Archbishop of Patras, William Frangipani. When William died in 1337, Bertrand laid siege to Patras hoping to reduce it to obedience before the arrival of his successor, Roger. Pope Benedict XII reacted by declaring the city "land of the Holy Roman Church" and placed the Principality under the interdict. As a result, Bertrand had to retreat, and the Archbishop became independent, although his secular fiefs still owed allegiance and services to the Prince.

Bertrand was re-appointed as bailli of Achaea after Catherine's departure for Italy in 1341, and remained in the post until 1344. He then returned to France, where in 1345 Pope Clement VI appointed him to replace Martino Zaccaria and the other leaders of the Smyrniote Crusade after they were killed in an ambush. He was refused permission to sail east by King Philip VI of France, however, due to France's involvement in the Hundred Years' War with England. He died in 1347.

== Sources ==
- Bon, Antoine (1969). La Morée franque. Recherches historiques, topographiques et archéologiques sur la principauté d'Achaïe [The Frankish Morea. Historical, Topographic and Archaeological Studies on the Principality of Achaea] (in French). Paris: De Boccard. OCLC 869621129.
- Setton, Kenneth M. (1976). The Papacy and the Levant (1204–1571), Volume I: The Thirteenth and Fourteenth Centuries. Vol. 1. Philadelphia: The American Philosophical Society. ISBN 0-87169-114-0.
- Topping, Peter (1975). "The Morea, 1311–1364". In Setton, Kenneth M.; Hazard, Harry W. (eds.). A History of the Crusades, Volume III: The Fourteenth and Fifteenth Centuries. Vol. 3. Madison and London: University of Wisconsin Press. pp. 104–140. ISBN 0-299-06670-3.

Unknown	Angevin bailli in the Principality of Achaea; 1336–1338	Vacant Direct rule by Princess Catherine of Valois Title next held by himself
Vacant Direct rule by Princess Catherine of Valois Title last held by himself	Angevin bailli in the Principality of Achaea; 1341–1344	Unknown
