= Barony of Patras =

European polity

- Barony of the Principality of Achaea
- 1209–1429/30
- Map of the Peloponnese with its principal locations during the late Middle Ages
- Capital: Patras
- Area
  - Coordinates: 38°15′N 21°44′E
  - Type: Feudal lordship
- Historical era: Middle Ages
  - Established: 1209
  - Independence from Achaea: 1337
  - Venetian administration: 1408–13
  - Byzantine reconquest: 1429/30
| Succeeded by |
| Despotate of the Morea |

The Barony of Patras was a medieval Frankish fiefdom of the Principality of Achaea, located in the northwestern coast of the Peloponnese peninsula in Greece, centred on the town of Patras. It was among the twelve original baronies of the Principality of Achaea, but passed into the hands of the Latin Archbishop of Patras at about the middle of the 13th century. From 1337 on, Patras was an ecclesiastical domain de facto independent of the Principality, although the archbishops still recognized its suzerainty for their secular fiefs. The archbishops maintained close relations with the Republic of Venice, which governed the barony in 1408–1413 and 1418. The barony survived until the Byzantine reconquest in 1429–30.

== History ==
The Barony of Patras was established ca. 1209, after the conquest of the Peloponnese by the Crusaders, and was one of the original twelve secular baronies within the Principality of Achaea. With twenty-four knight's fiefs attached to it, Patras, along with Akova, was the largest and one of the most important baronies of the Principality. Patras was in addition the seat of a Latin Archbishopric, which ranked as a distinct ecclesiastic vassal fief with eight knightly fiefs to its name. Relations between the Archbishop and the secular barons, and indeed with the Prince himself, were initially strained. This was due to quarrels between the Archbishop and the Prince over the Latin clergy's allegiance and obligations to the Principality, and resulted in such incidents as the baron's forcible eviction of the Archbishop from his residence and the cathedral of St. Theodore, which were incorporated into the Patras Castle.

According to the French, Greek and Italian versions of the Chronicle of the Morea, the secular barony was granted to a knight from the Provence, William Aleman, but the Treaty of Sapienza between Achaea and the Republic of Venice, concluded in June 1209, mentions Arnulf Aleman as baron, probably William's otherwise unknown predecessor. In addition, the Aragonese version of the Chronicle lists a completely different, but unverifiable series of barons, beginning with Walter Aleman, who was succeeded by his son Conrad and he in turn by William (II), who then sold the rights to the barony to the Archbishop of Patras ca. 1276. Historians have generally followed this account in dating the cession of the barony to the Archbishopric to about or shortly after the middle of the century, but the transfer may have taken place, or at least begun, as early as the 1220s, for the first archbishop, Antelm of Cluny, is said to have had possession of the Patras Castle by 1233.

The Archbishop now found himself, with thirty-two fiefs, as the strongest vassal of the Principality, and became a major factor in its affairs. Under William Frangipani (1317–1337) in particular, Patras enjoyed close relations with Venice and acted practically independent from the Prince. As a result, when Frangipani died in 1337, the Angevin bailli, Bertrand of Les Baux, whom Frangipani had opposed, laid siege to the city hoping to reduce it to obedience. In the event, Pope Benedict XII reacted by declaring the city "land of the Holy Roman Church" and placed the Principality under the interdict. The mother and regent of the Prince, Catherine of Valois, conceded to the Church's demands. As a result, the Archbishop became independent, although his secular fiefs still owed allegiance and services to the Prince.

For the remainder of the century, the Archbishops of Patras played an active role in the intrigues and feuds of the Principality, and in turn the contending families often tried to place one of their own scions on the archiepiscopal throne. However, the increasing Ottoman threat on the Greek mainland and the depredations of the Albanians led the Archbishops to turn increasingly to Venice for protection; after several entreaties to secure its protection, in 1408 the Republic took over the administration of the barony, although it remained Church territory, in exchange for a rent of 1,000 ducats a year. This move was opposed by the Pope, however, and in 1413 Venice returned the administration to the Archbishopric; another attempt in 1418 again faltered at the opposition of the Holy See. Finally, in 1429/30, the city and the citadel were surrendered to the Byzantine Greeks of the Despotate of the Morea under Constantine Palaiologos, the future last Byzantine emperor.

== Sources ==
- Bon, Antoine (1969). La Morée franque. Recherches historiques, topographiques et archéologiques sur la principauté d'Achaïe [The Frankish Morea. Historical, Topographic and Archaeological Studies on the Principality of Achaea] (in French). Paris: De Boccard. OCLC 869621129.
- Miller, William (1921). Essays on the Latin Orient. Cambridge: Cambridge University Press. OCLC 457893641.
- Schabel, Chris (2008). "Antelm the Nasty, First Latin Archbishop of Patras". In Beihammer, Alexander D.; Parani, Maria G.; Schabel, Christopher D. (eds.). Diplomatics in the Eastern Mediterranean 1000–1500: Aspects of Cross-Cultural Communication. Leiden: BRILL. pp. 93–138. ISBN 978-90-04-16547-2.
- Topping, Peter (1975). "The Morea, 1311–1364". In Setton, Kenneth M.; Hazard, Harry W. (eds.). A History of the Crusades, Volume III: The Fourteenth and Fifteenth Centuries. Madison and London: University of Wisconsin Press. pp. 104–140. ISBN 0-299-06670-3.
- Topping, Peter (1975). "The Morea, 1364–1460". In Setton, Kenneth M.; Hazard, Harry W. (eds.). A History of the Crusades, Volume III: The Fourteenth and Fifteenth Centuries. Madison and London: University of Wisconsin Press. pp. 141–166. ISBN 0-299-06670-3.
