= Philip Gaius =

Philip Gaius (Italian: Filippo Gaius, Serbian: Filip Gajo) served as an archbishop of Antivari in the late 15th century.

Originally from Venice, Pope Innocent VIII appointed Gaius as Archbishop of Antivari in 1485. During Gaius' pontificate in Antivari, he acted as a deputy to the Bishop of Vicenza. In that city, he awaited the arrival of Princess Anna de Foix, who was travelling to Hungary to wed its ruler, Vladislaus II.

Archbishop Gaius was the first archbishop of Antivari to carry the title "Primas Serviae" (Primate of Serbia). In 1503, while in Venice, he carved the title in a memorial in a church, which mentions Gaius as a primate.
