= William Frangipani =

Roman Catholic archbishop (died 1337)

William Frangipani (Italian: Guglielmo Frangipani; Greek: Γουλιέλμος Φραγκιπάνης; died 1337) was the Latin Archbishop of Patras and ruler of the Barony of Patras in Frankish Greece from 1317 until his death in 1337.

== Biography ==
A member of the Franciscan Order, William Frangipani was the scion of a prominent Roman family. Occupying the see of Patras since 3 January 1317, he proved an able and energetic prelate, and during his tenure he acted as a virtually autonomous lord. Frangipani entertained close ties to the Republic of Venice—he became a Venetian citizen on 30 January 1336—and in 1321, as the Principality of Achaea was threatened by Byzantine advances under Andronikos Asen, headed an unsuccessful movement to offer the Republic control of what remained of the Principality.

Nevertheless, in 1325, he participated along with the other magnates and feudal lords of the Principality in the ceremonial reception of the new Prince, John of Gravina, at Glarentsa. In 1329 he was named as bailli of the Principality, as John of Gravina had left the Morea for Italy. He was the first cleric to be appointed to the post, which he kept until 1331. Aside from adjudicating differences between the various feudal lords, his main responsibility during those years was the provisioning of the Achaean fortresses with grain, which had to be imported from Italy.

After 1330, following Papal policy, he opposed the Catalans of the Duchy of Athens, repeatedly excommunicating them. Although hitherto a loyal servant of the Principality, after the arrival of a new bailli, Bertrand des Baux, in early 1336, his relations with the princely administration deteriorated quickly: William refused to pay homage to the Prince any longer, and his acquisition of Venetian citizenship signalled the definitive breach. Consequently, when Frangipani died in 1337, Bertrand laid siege to Patras hoping to reduce it to obedience before the arrival of his successor, Roger. Pope Benedict XII reacted by declaring the city "land of the Holy Roman Church" and placed the Principality under the interdict. As a result, Bertrand had to retreat, and the Archbishop became independent, although his secular fiefs still owed allegiance and services to the Prince.

== Sources ==
- Bon, Antoine (1969). La Morée franque. Recherches historiques, topographiques et archéologiques sur la principauté d'Achaïe [The Frankish Morea. Historical, Topographic and Archaeological Studies on the Principality of Achaea] (in French). Paris: De Boccard.
- Topping, Peter (1975). "The Morea, 1311–1364". In Setton, Kenneth M.; Hazard, Harry W. (eds.). A History of the Crusades, Volume III: The Fourteenth and Fifteenth Centuries. Vol. 3. Madison and London: University of Wisconsin Press. pp. 104–140. ISBN 0-299-06670-3.

Catholic Church titles
Preceded by Raynier	Latin Archbishop of Patras; 1317–1337	Succeeded by Roger
Political offices
Preceded by Francesco de la Monaca	Angevin bailli in the Principality of Achaea; 1329–1331	Succeeded by Gerardo d'Anguilara
