= Antelm of Cluny =

Burgundian monk

Ordination history of Antelm of Cluny
History
Episcopal consecration
- Consecrated by: Pope Innocent III
- Date: 29 April 1207
Episcopal succession
Bishops consecrated by Antelm of Cluny as principal consecrator
- Gilibert of Nikli, O.S.B.: 1209

Antelm of Cluny (fl. 1205 – c. 1241) was a Burgundian monk who became the first Latin Archbishop of Patras, and was one of the most important figures in the early Principality of Achaea in Greece. He was consecrated a bishop with Pope Innocent III acting as the principal consecrator on 29 April 1207 in Rome, Papal States.

== Sources ==
- Bon, Antoine (1969). La Morée franque. Recherches historiques, topographiques et archéologiques sur la principauté d'Achaïe [The Frankish Morea. Historical, Topographic and Archaeological Studies on the Principality of Achaea] (in French). Paris: De Boccard.
- Schabel, Chris (2008). "Antelm the Nasty, First Latin Archbishop of Patras". In Beihammer, Alexander D.; Parani, Maria G.; Schabel, Christopher D. (eds.). Diplomatics in the Eastern Mediterranean 1000–1500: Aspects of Cross-Cultural Communication. Leiden: BRILL. pp. 93–138. ISBN 978-90-04-16547-2.
