= Latin Bishopric of Coron =

The Latin Bishopric of Coron or Diocese of Coronea (Latin: Dioecesis Coronensis) was a Roman Catholic diocese located in the town of Coron in Messenia, Peloponnese, Greece, during its rule by the Republic of Venice. Following the Ottoman conquest in 1500, it was suppressed; in 1933, it was restored as a titular see.

== Ordinaries ==
- Paolo Foscari (24 Apr 1366 Appointed - 7 May 1367 Bishop of Castello)
- Bartolomeo Lopaci, O.P. (27 Jun 1449 Appointed - 1457 Resigned)
- Giovanni Ducco (7 Jun 1479 Appointed - 21 Jan 1496 Died)
