= Patras =

Patras Πάτρα
- City
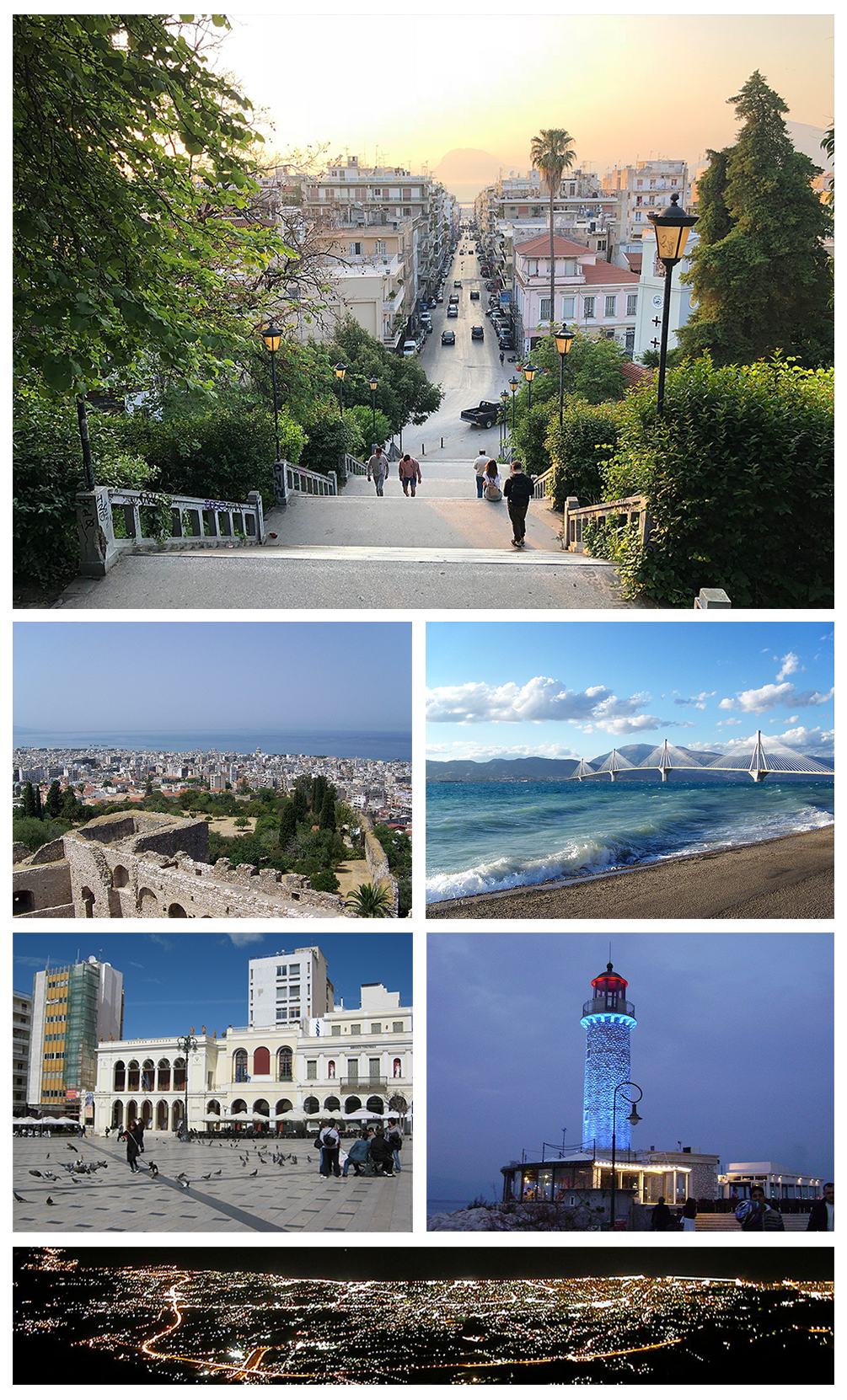
- Clockwise from top: Panoramic view of downtown: Trion Symmachon square and Dock (molos) area from Agiou Nikolaou Stairs, Rio-Antirio Bridge and Gulf of Corinth, Lighthouse of Patras, Night view of Patras from Romanos Mona Forest Park, Apollon Theatre and Georgiou I Square, Castle of Patras.

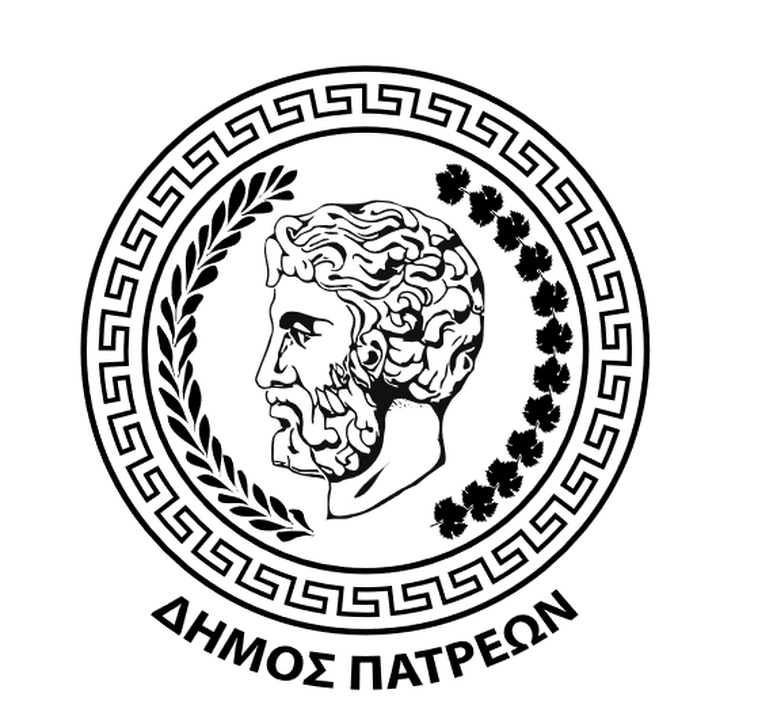
- Seal

- Location within Greece Location within Europe Patras (Europe)
- Coordinates: 38°15′N 21°44′E
- Country: Greece
- Geographic region: Peloponnese
- Administrative region: Western Greece
- Regional unit: Achaia
- Districts: 5

Government
  - Type: Mayor–council government
  - Mayor: Kostas Peletidis (KKE)

Area
  - Municipality: 334.9 km^{2} (129.3 sq mi)
  - Urban: 125.4 km^{2} (48.4 sq mi)
- Highest elevation: 10 m (33 ft)
- Lowest elevation: 0 m (0 ft)

Population (2021)
  - Municipality: 215,922
  - Urban: 173,600
  - Urban density: 1,384/km^{2} (3,586/sq mi)
  - Metro: 305,979
- Demonym: Patrinos (Greek: Πατρινός)
- Time zone: UTC+2 (EET)
  - Summer (DST): UTC+3 (EEST)
- Postal codes: 26x xx
- Telephone: 261
- Vehicle registration: ΑXx, ΑZx, AOx, AYx
- Patron saint: Saint Andrew (30 November)
- Website: www.e-patras.gr

Patras (/pəˈtræs, ˈpætrəs/; Greek: Πάτρα, romanized: Pátra pronounced [ˈpatra]; Katharevousa and Ancient Greek: Πάτραι; (Note: romanized: Pátrai, Ancient Greek: [pátrai̯], Katharevousa: [ˈpatre]) Latin: Patrae (Note: [ˈpatrae̯])) is the capital and largest city of Western Greece, in the northern Peloponnese, 215 km (134 mi) west of Athens. It is Greece's third-largest city. The city is built at the foot of Mount Panachaikon, overlooking the Gulf of Patras.

As of the 2021 census, the municipality of Patras has a population of 215,922, while the urban population is 173,600. The core settlement has a history spanning four millennia. In the Roman period, it had become a cosmopolitan centre of the eastern Mediterranean whilst, according to the Christian tradition, it was also the place of Saint Andrew's martyrdom.

Dubbed Greece's "Gate to the West", Patras is a commercial hub, while its busy port is a nodal point for trade and communication with Italy and the rest of Western Europe. The city has three public universities, hosting a large student population and rendering Patras an important scientific centre with a field of excellence in technological education. The Rio-Antirrio Bridge connects Patras's easternmost suburb of Rio to the town of Antirrio, connecting the Peloponnese peninsula with mainland Greece.

Every year, in February, the city hosts one of Europe's largest carnivals. Notable features of the Patras Carnival include its mammoth satirical floats and balls and parades, enjoyed by hundreds of thousands of visitors in a Mediterranean climate. Patras is also famous for supporting an indigenous cultural scene active mainly in the performing arts and modern urban literature. It was European Capital of Culture in 2006.

== History ==
For the Ancient Greek, Roman and Byzantine history of Patras see: History of Patras.

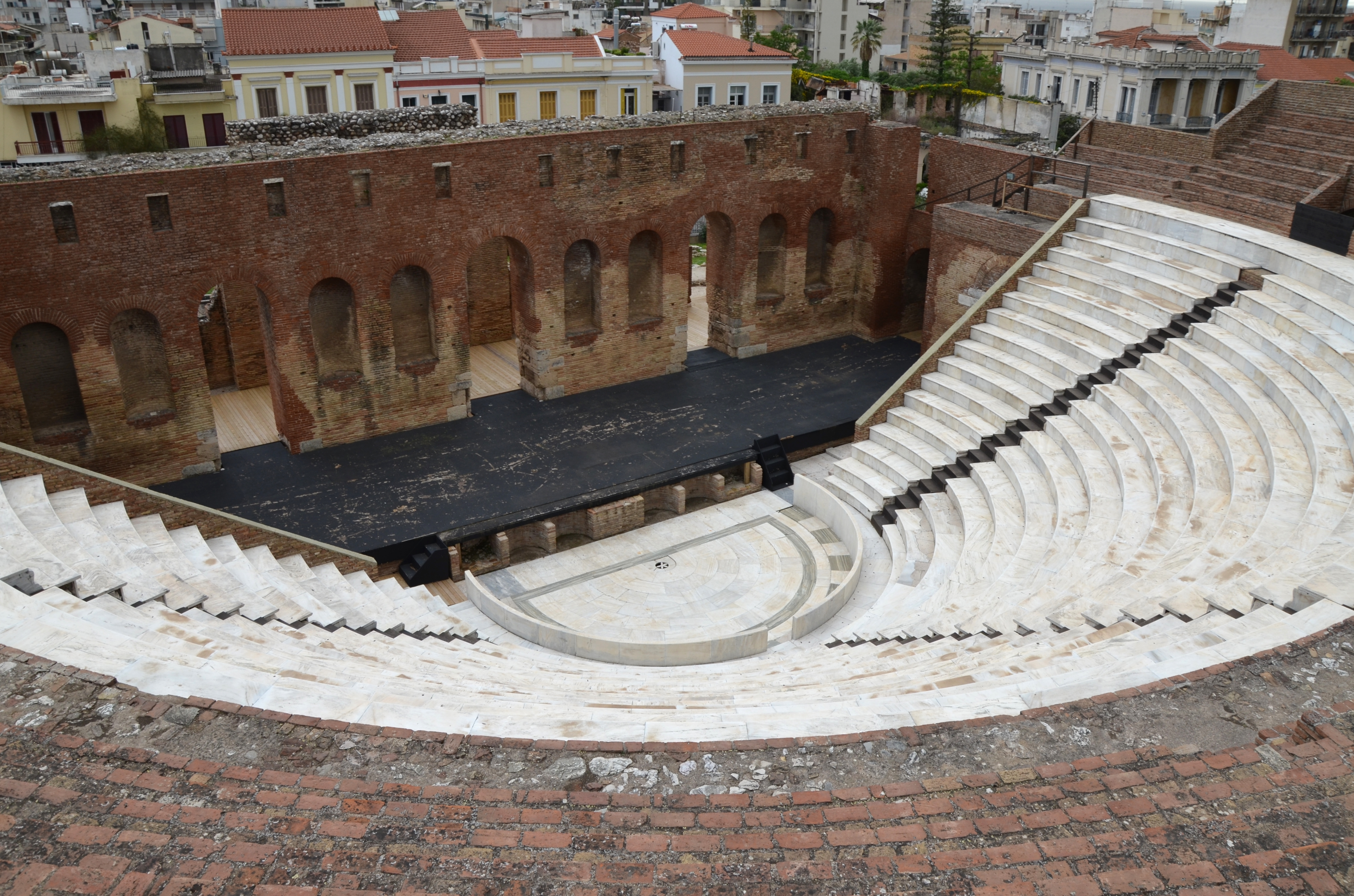
View of the recently restored Roman Odeon (2015)

=== Middle Ages and early modern ===
The Principality of Achaea in southern Greece, 1278

In 1205, the city was captured by William of Champlitte and Geoffrey I of Villehardouin, and became a part of the principality of Achaea. It became the seat of the Barony of Patras, and its Latin archbishop primate of the principality. In 1408, Patras became Venetian, until it was recaptured in 1430 by the Despotate of Morea and its despot Constantine Palaiologos, who thus succeeded in recovering for the Byzantine Empire the whole of the Morea, apart from Venetian possessions. The administration of Patras was given to George Sphrantzes, while Constantine was immediately contested by the Ottoman Empire and later, in 1449, became emperor of the Byzantine Empire.

Patras remained a part of the Despotate of Morea until 1458, when it was conquered by the Sultan of the Ottoman Empire, Mehmet II. Under the Ottomans, it was known as "Baliabadra", from the Greek: Παλαιά Πάτρα ('Old Patras'), as opposed to Νέα Πάτρα ('new Patra'), the town of Ypati in Central Greece. Though Mehmet granted the city special privileges and tax reductions, it never became a major centre of commerce. Venice and Genoa attacked and captured it several times in the 15th and 16th centuries, but never re-established their rule effectively, except for a period of Venetian rule in 1687–1715 after the Morean War.

It has been noted that during and in the aftermath of the suppressed 1770 Orlov revolt "when the Greeks got the upper hand they settled old scores; when the Turks and Albanians reasserted themselves they were merciless: recapturing Patras, they left scarcely anyone alive."

In 1772, a naval battle took place off the city between the Russians and Ottomans.

=== Modern era ===
Patras was one of the first cities in which the Greek Revolution began in 1821; the Ottoman garrison, confined to the citadel, held out until 1828. After the war, most of the city and its buildings were completely destroyed.

Patras developed quickly into the second-largest urban centre in late-19th-century Greece. The city benefited from its role as the main export port for the agricultural produce of the Peloponnese.

In the early 20th century, Patras developed fast and became the first Greek city to introduce public streetlights and electrified tramways. In the Second World War, the city was a major target of Italian air raids. In the Axis occupation period, a German military command was established and German and Italian troops stationed in the city. After the liberation in 1944, the city recovered, but in later years was increasingly overshadowed by the urban pole of Athens. Since 2014, the city's mayor is Kostas Peletidis.

== Urban landscape ==
The city is divided into the upper and the lower section, connected with roads and broad stairs. The upper section (Ano Poli) is the older and the more picturesque; however, the lower section (Kato Poli) is laid out according to the 1858 city plan, featuring a variety of squares. The most notable of these are the Psila Alonia and the Georgiou I Square. A number of notable neoclassical buildings are to be found, including the Apollon Theatre in Georgiou I Square, the City Hall, the headquarters of the Local Trade Association and the Court of Justice. A replica of Patras Lighthouse, the city's emblematic old lighthouse – which was at the dock of Ayios Nikolaos – rises at the end of Trion Navarchon street, near the temple of Saint Andreas.

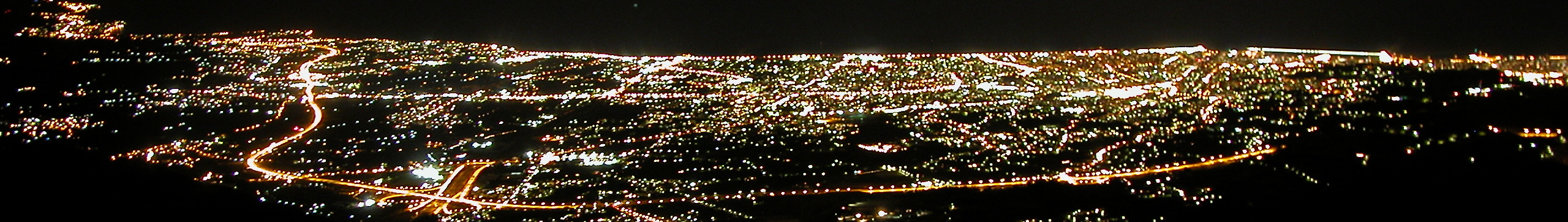
Night view

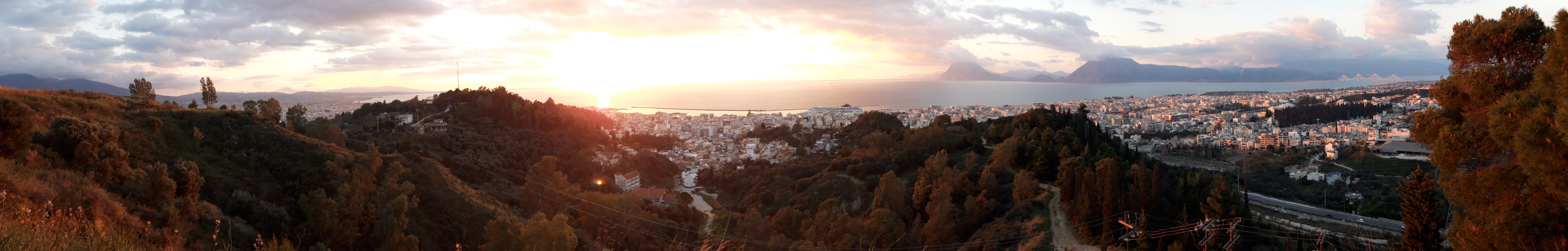
Patras at sunset from a hill NE of Dasyllio

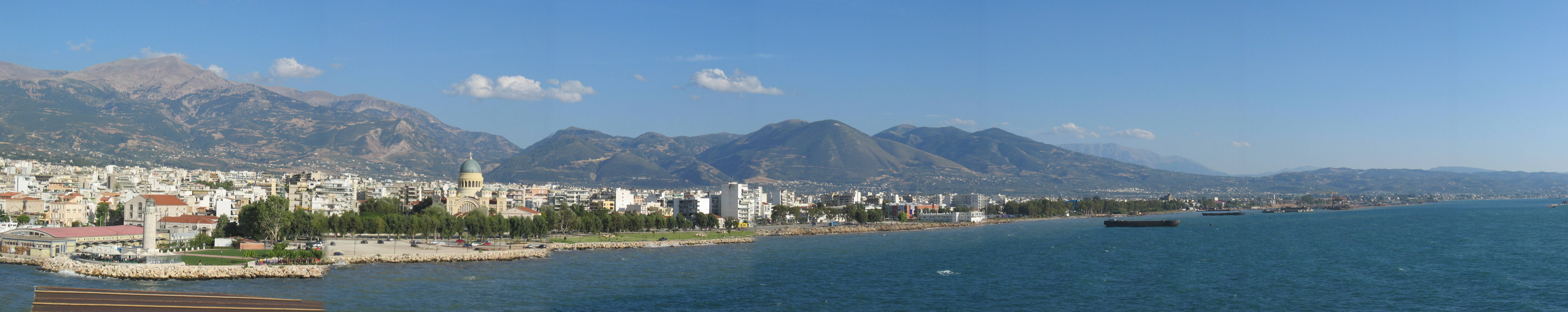
Patras's western seafront.

In general, much of Patras's coastline is framed by roads and avenues running alongside; these include Dymaion Coast to the south and Iroon Polytechneiou Street to the north.

=== Main sights ===
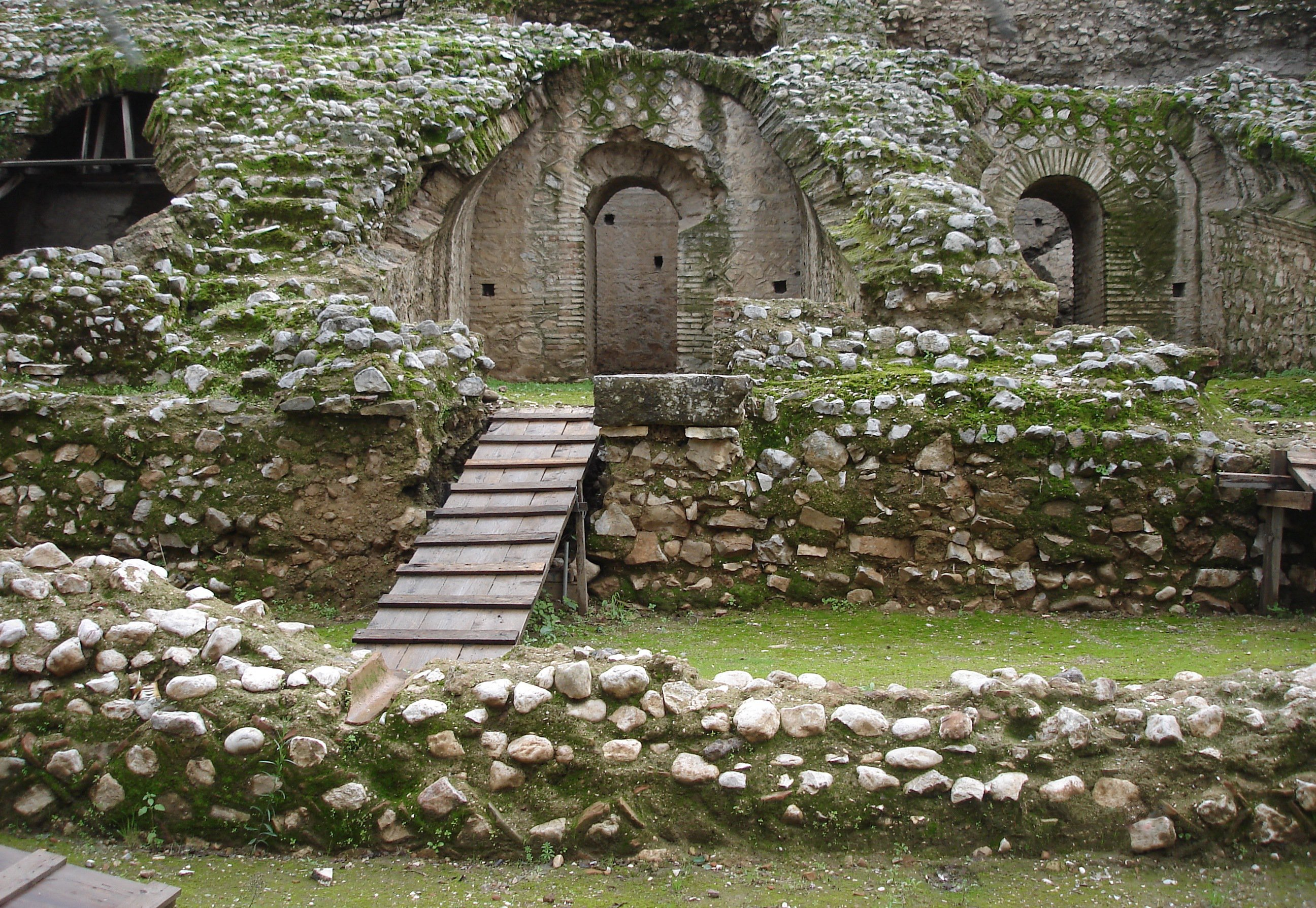
Ruins of the Roman stadium

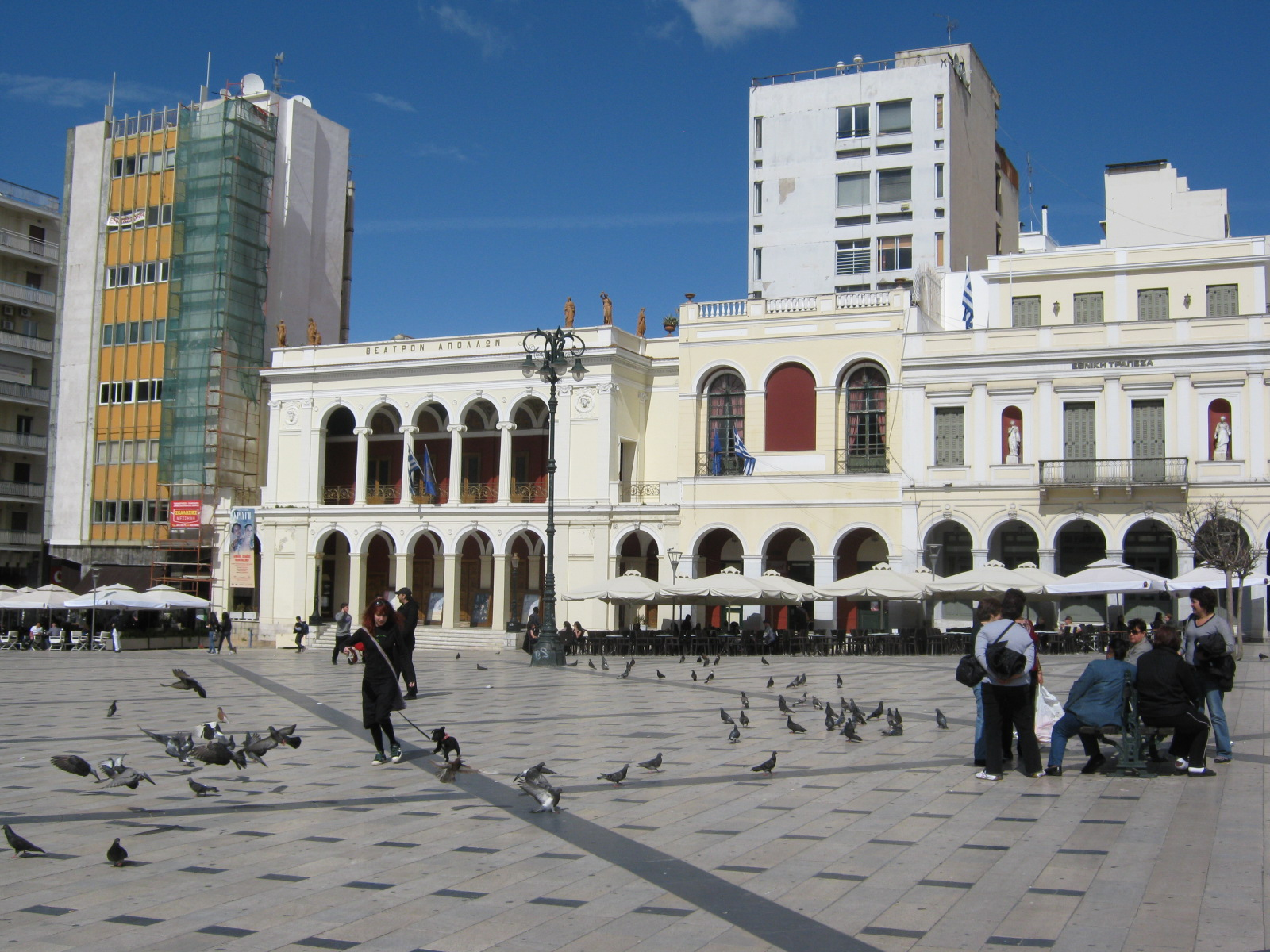
Georgiou I Square

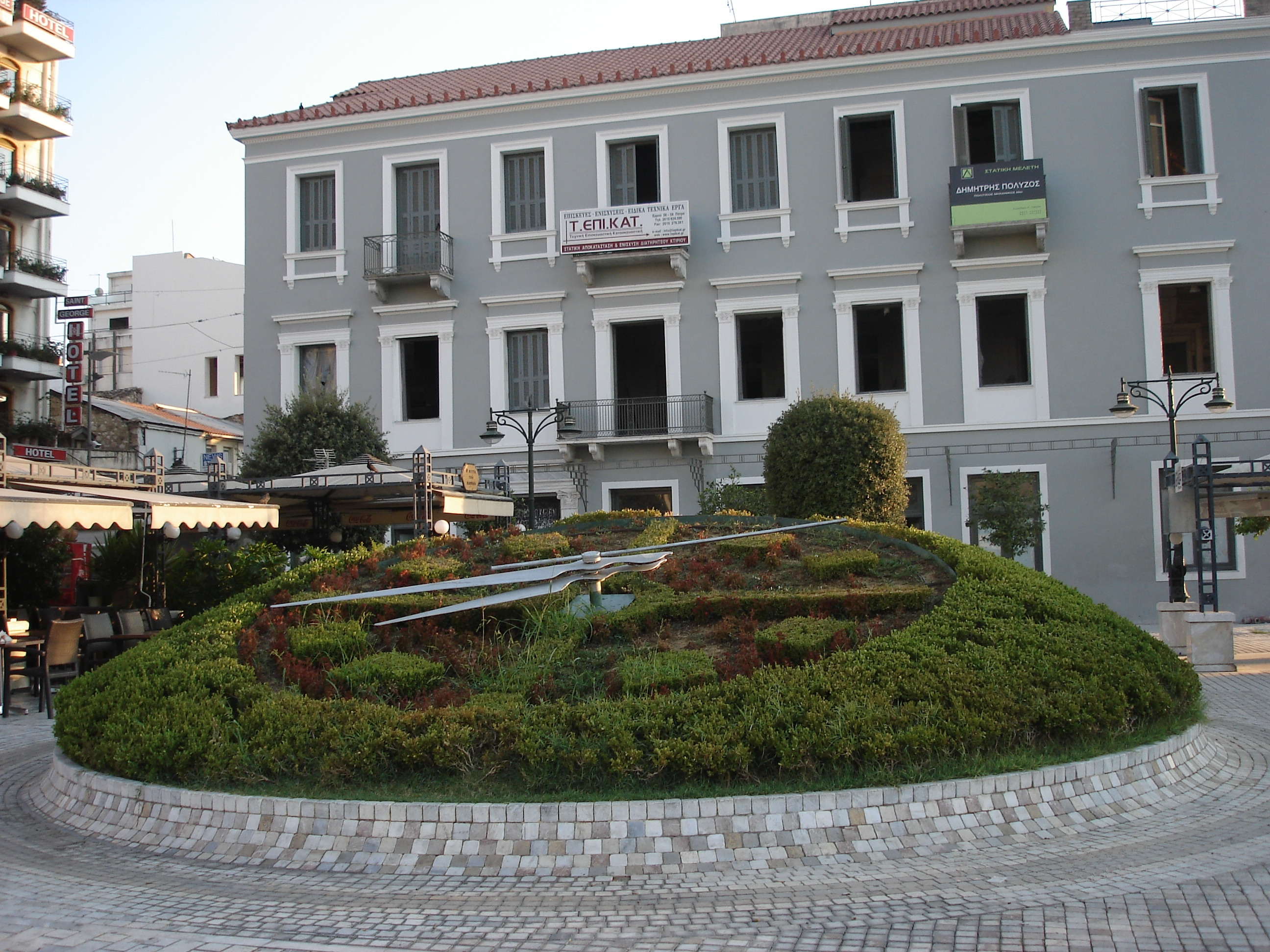
Trion Symmachon Square and clock with the former hotel Metropolis in the background

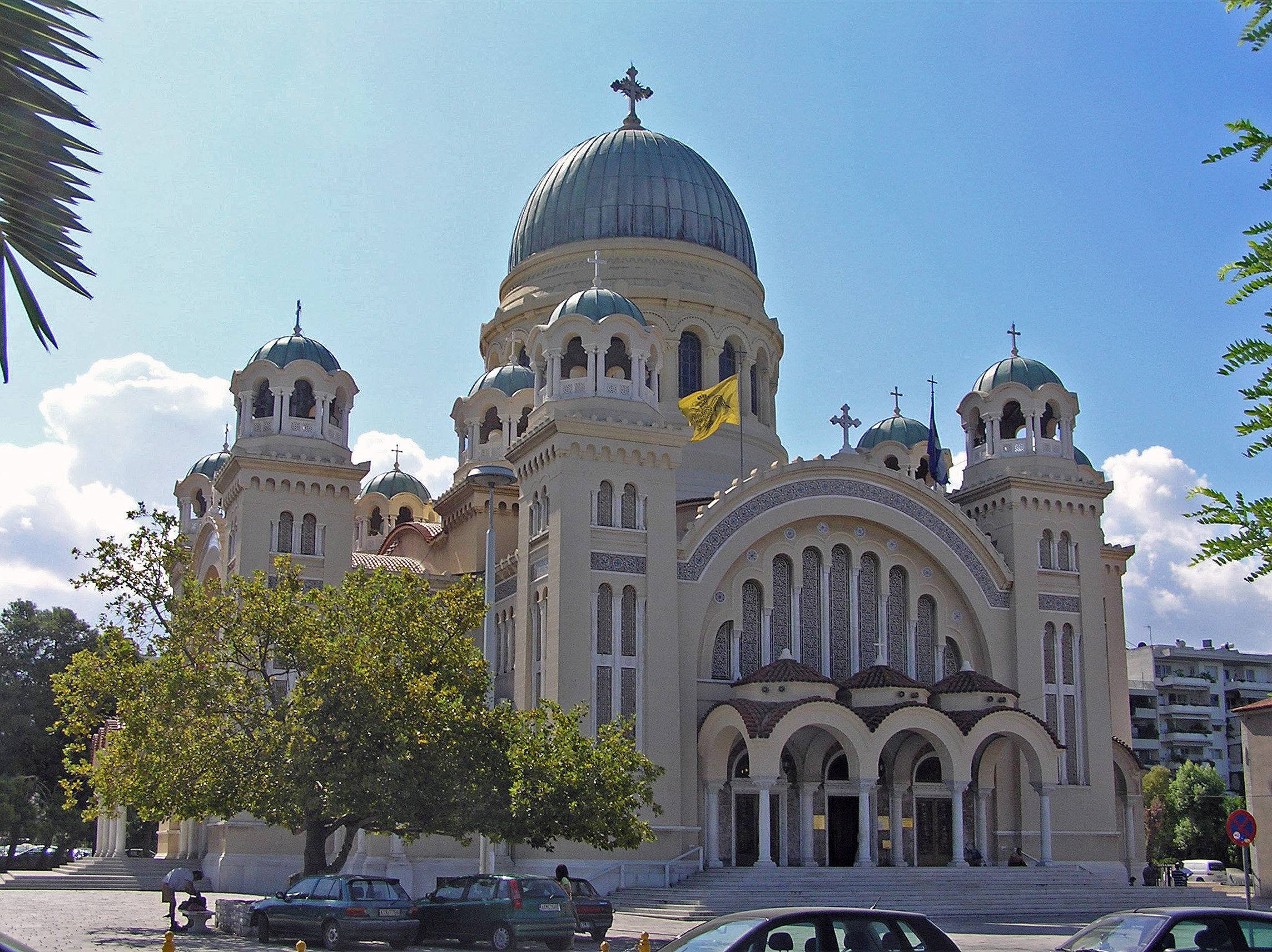
Cathedral of Saint Andrew, patron saint of the city.

The entrance of the new Archaeological Museum of Patras

Patras and its region is home to various Ancient Greek, Roman and Byzantine Monuments, including the Roman Odeon of Patras, the Fortress of Rio and the Fortress (castle) of Patras. More specifically, the main sights of the city are:

- The Patras Archaeological Museum focuses on the exhibition of various archaeological finds, from the Mycenaean to the Late Roman era, discovered in Patras and the wider Achaea region. The museum is housed in a modern and special architectural building designed by the architect Theophanis Bobotis.
- The Mycenaean cemetery of Voudeni (Skioessa), 8 km (5.0 mi) from the center of Patras, is one of the most important sites of the Mycenaean world, showing active use for nearly five hundred years (1500–1000 BC). The site itself appears to have been inhabited from the Bronze Age until middle Roman times (1800 BC–AD 400).
- The Roman Odeon, the most significant ancient monument, is in the upper town and was built around 160 AD, in the reign of either Antoninus Pius or Marcus Aurelius. It has been restored and partially reconstructed, and is used as an open-air theatre for performances and concerts in the summer.
- The Roman Amphitheatre, near the Roman Odeon, in Ifestou street, dating from the 1st century AD, at a period of the biggest development of Roman Patras. Its area has been only partially excavated.
- The Roman aqueduct that led from the springs of Romanos to the acropolis. The aqueduct measured 6.5 km (4.04 mi) from the water cistern to the castle. For the greater part of this distance, the water passed through an underground channel, passing over valleys and gorges on carefully constructed archways, parts of which still stand, in the area of Aroi.

Other Roman monuments include the ruins of the Roman stadium, remains of the Roman wall and a preserved bridge over the river Kallinaos.

- The medieval Patras Castle, in the ancient acropolis overlooking the city, was initially built in the 6th century AD by the Byzantine emperor Justinian, having many additions from the period of the Frankish and Venetian rule of the city, up to as far as the time of the Despotate of Morea and later the Ottoman Empire. Its current outline dates back to the second Venetian rule of the town (1687–1715). Today, is visiting and its interior is used as a public garden.
- The orthodox church of Saint Andrew of Patras was founded in 1908 by King George I and was inaugurated in 1974. It is dedicated to Saint Andrew, the patron of the city, and contains relics of the saint at the location of his crucifixion. It is the second-largest temple of Byzantine style in the Balkans (after the Cathedral of Saint Sava in Belgrade). The central cupola is 46 m (151 ft) tall and is the base for a 5 m (16 ft) gold-plated cross and twelve smaller ones, symbolising Christ and the twelve apostles. A congregation of at least 5,000 can attend a sermon within the church.
- The municipal Theatre Apollon, built in 1872 designed by architect Ernst Ziller. The building is characteristic of the 19th-century neoclassical style and is in the central square of the city.
- The Achaia Clauss wine industry and tasting center, which is on the outskirts in Petroto village. It was founded in 1861 by the Bavarian Gustav Clauss and is most famous for its Mavrodaphne.This place also houses the oldest wine of Greece, the old mavrodaphne of 1873.
- Residence of Kostis Palamas, a preserved neoclassical building on 241 Corinthou Street in the city center, where poet Kostis Palamas and the Italian painter Matilde Serao were born.
- Old Patras Hospital, a neoclassical building on Ano Poli, near Castle, designed by architect Christian Hansen.
- The Ottoman baths (16th century), still retain their initial use, and are one of the oldest Ottoman baths surviving in Europe.
- The Patras Lighthouse, a reconstructed "Faros", a landmark of the city.
- The Agiou Nikolaou Stairs, Gerokostopoulou Stairs, Patreos Stairs and Trion Navarchon Stairs, outdoor grand staircases all over the centre of the city dividing the upper town from downtown.
- Rio-Antirrio Bridge, is a modern landmark of place and one of the world's longest multi-span cable-stayed bridges and longest of the fully suspended type.

=== Parks and squares ===
- Georgiou I Square, the central square and the heart of the city. It was named after King George I. The square's fountains were installed in 1875 at a cost of 70,000 drachmas each, a huge amount for the finances of Greece and Patra at the time. It was and continues to be the center of political and cultural life in the city, hosting all significant activities, political gatherings, rallies, cultural events and, most importantly for some, its carnival.
- Ethnikis Antistaseos ("National Resistance Square")

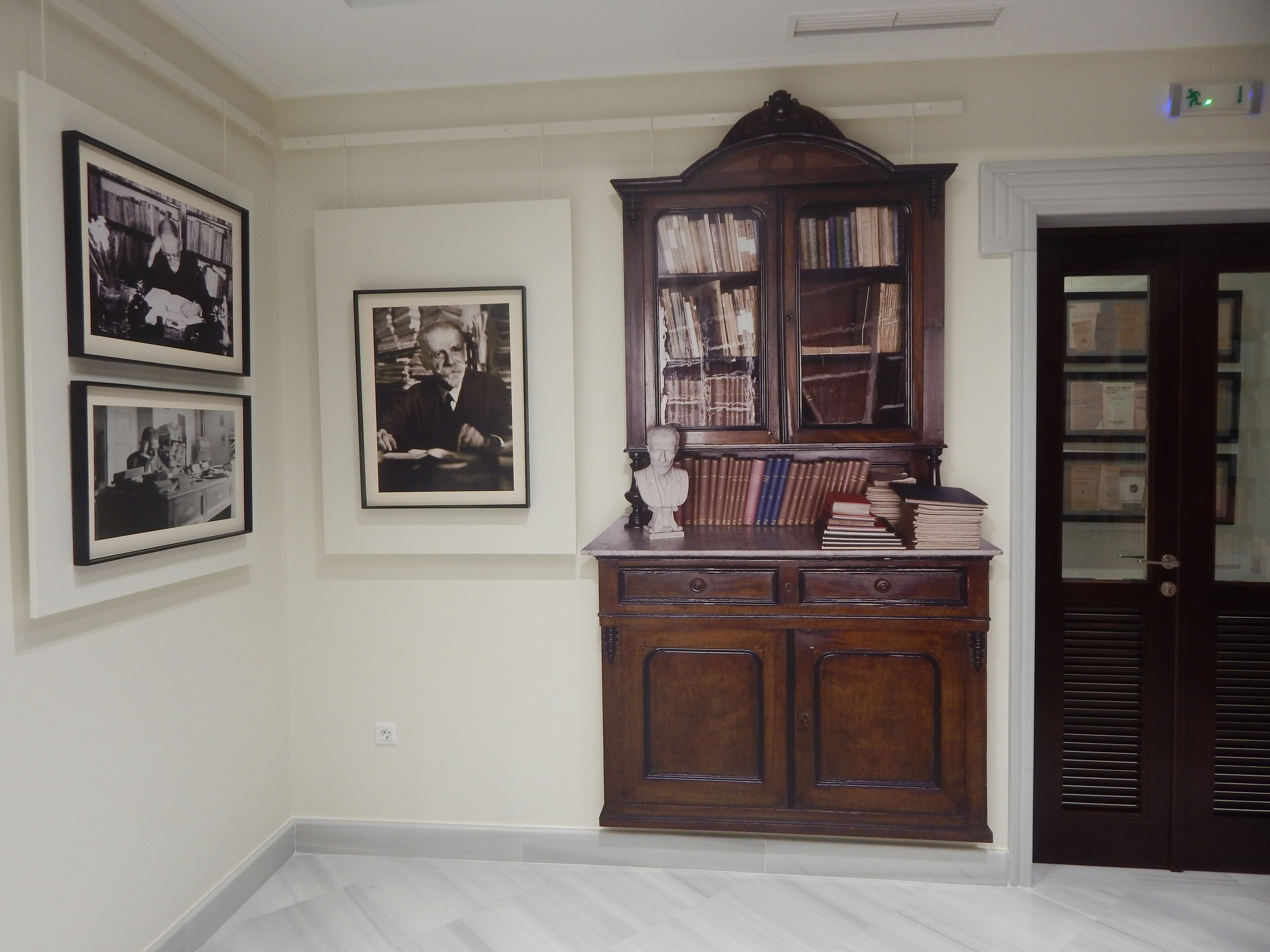
Inside the home of Palamas

- Kapodistria Square in the district of Markato.
- Trion Symmachon Square bears the name of the three Allied Powers who fought in the Battle of Navarino; Britain, France and Russia. The square features a flower clock and links the Agiou Nikolaou pedestrian way with the seaside front and the dock of Agios Nikolaos.
- Psilalonia Square (Ψηλαλώνια or formally Πλατεία Υψηλών Αλωνίων) is one of Patras's most popular squares. It is 1.5 km (0.93 mi) from downtown Patras, next to the city's main north–south street, Gounari Street. It features a fountain, many sidewalks, palm trees and playgrounds. It is surrounded by several shops, restaurants and cafes and a number of modernist buildings. It was completed in the mid-to-late 19th century, when trees were added, along with neoclassical buildings. After World War II and the Greek Civil War, however, and through the 1960s and 1970s, most neoclassical buildings were replaced by eight-storey residential buildings. In the west end, a 15-metre-tall (49 ft) cliff overlooks the pedestrian Trion Navarchon Street, and offers a wide vista across the western Gulf of Patras, including the mountains of Aitoloakarnania.
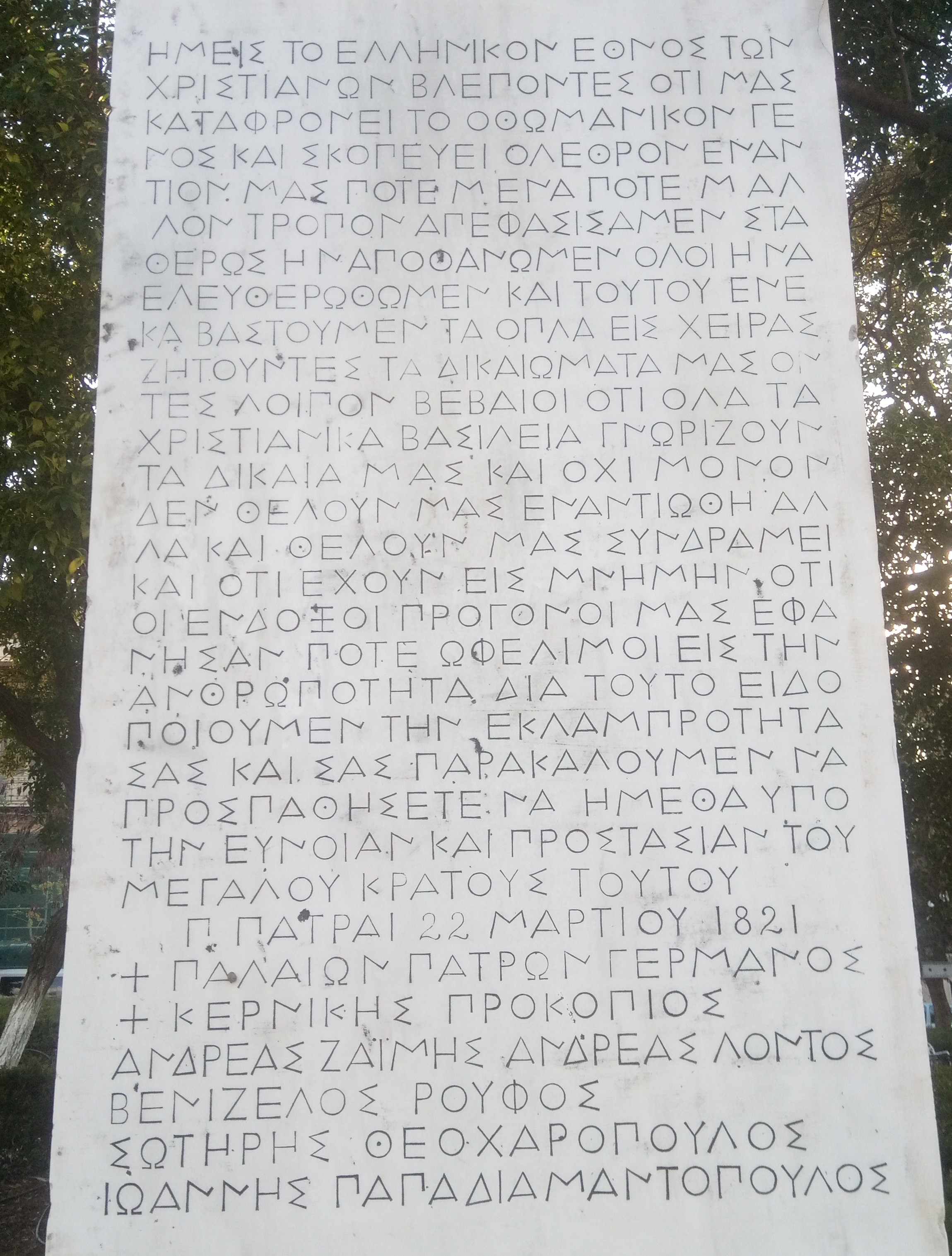
  The declaration of the revolutionaries of Patras (1821), engraved on a stele, Saint George Square
- Saint George Square (Πλατεία Αγίου Γεωργίου). There is the monument to the fighters of 1821 on which is engraved the "declaration of the revolutionaries of Patras to the states of Europe" (22 March 1821).
- The Spinney of Patras (Δασύλλιο), is in a pine-tree-covered hill, which is dubbed "the Gulf of Patras's veranda" because of the panoramic view it offers. The spinney is ideal for recreational walks and jogging, with its specially formed paths and the shade offered by the tall trees.
- South Park of Patras

=== Architecture ===
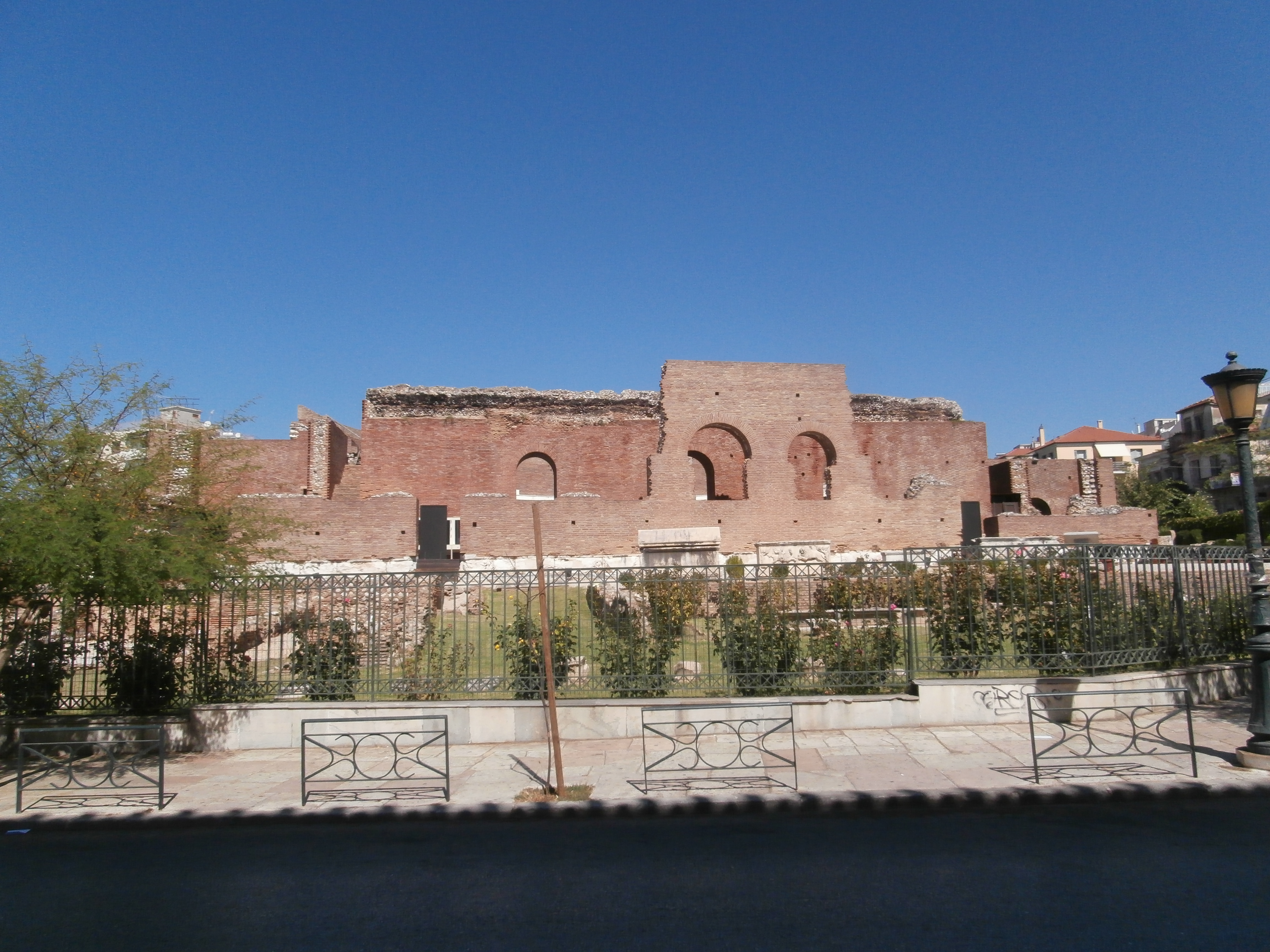
External view of the Roman Οdeon

Patra is a relatively newly built city, as its medieval buildings were completely destroyed in the Greek War of Independence. The oldest surviving buildings (apart from ancient monuments and the castle) are the church of Pantocrator in Ano Poli and a residential building (Tzini's house) at the corner of Agiou Nikolaou and Maisonos street, built in 1832. The area on the south of the castle, around the Roman Odeon, the church of Pantokrator, in the Upper Town (Ano Poli), is the most appealing of the city, because of its status as the only area where construction height is limited to two-storey buildings. Ιn Ano Poli is interesting the old school complex "Georgios Glarakis" work of the architect Georgios Petrιtsopoulos in 1931 which is built with stone and recently became a nice bioclimatic school. At the beginning of the 20th century, outside the school complex "Georgios Glarakis", line 2 of the tram ended, starting from Agios Dionysios, going up Dimitriou Gounari Street, passing behind the church of Pantanassa, entering Roman Odeon and finished outside the Glarakis school complex. Historical buildings and mansions of the city, apart Tzini's house, include also the Prapopoulos building, Golfinopoulos mansion (Alhambra), Perivolaropoulos mansion, Palamas house, while among the demolished after WWII were Tsiklitiras mansion, Kanellopoulos house, Chaidopoulos building, Frangopoulos house, Green mansion and Mineyko mansion.

=== Districts and neighbourhoods ===
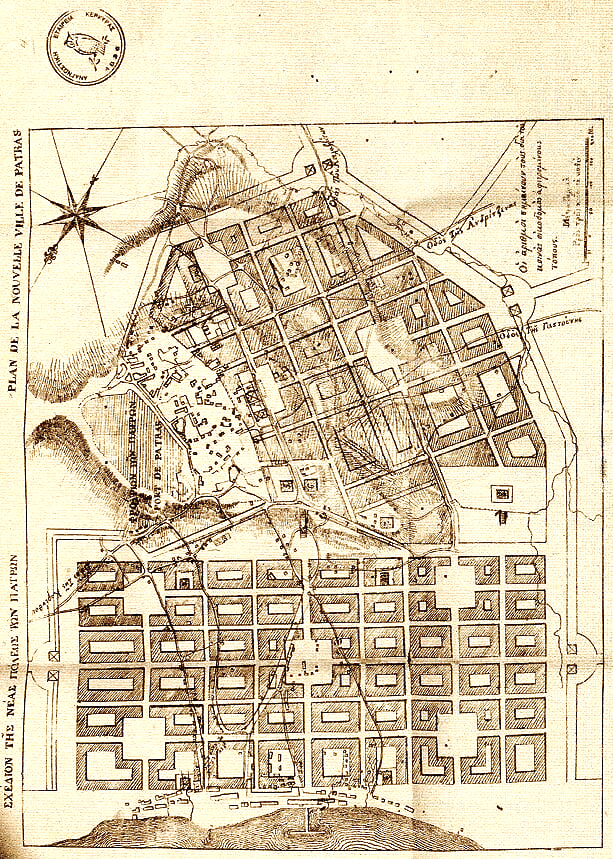
The first urban plan of Patras by Stamatis Voulgaris (1829)

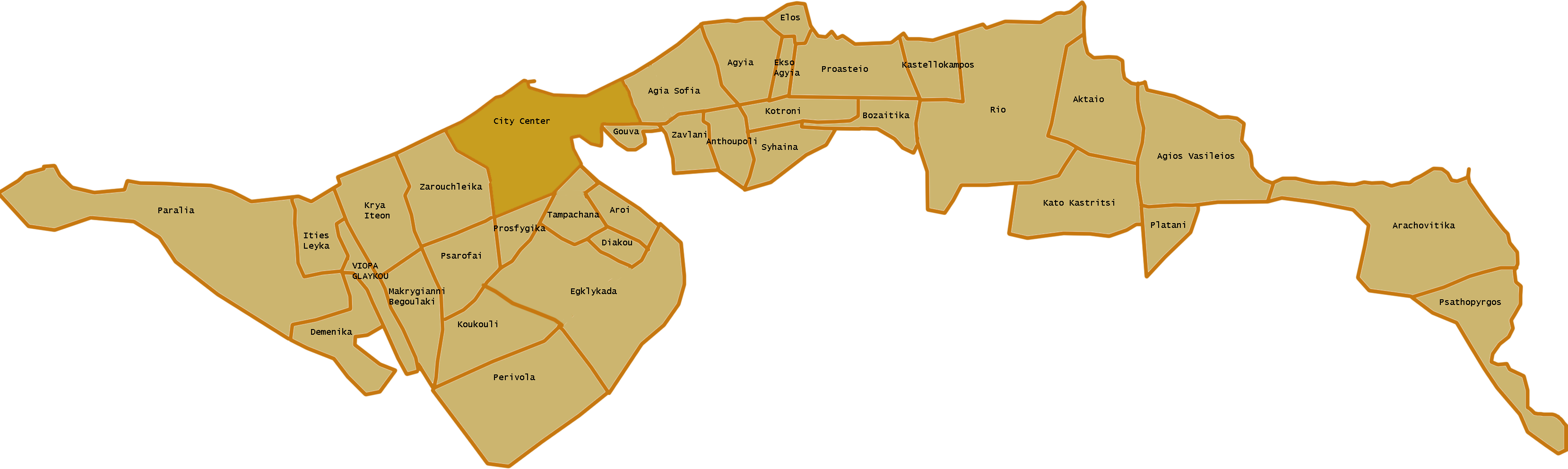
Patras city districts.

Nowadays, the municipal units of Rio, Paralia, Messatida and Vrachnaiika have functionally become a part of the wider urban complex of Patras. Apart from the city center, the main districts of Patras are:

Patras municipal unit:

- Agyia (north)
- Agia Sofia (north)
- Anthoupoli (north)
- Aroi (east)
- Begoulaki (south)
- Bozaitika (north)
- Eglykada (east)
- Gouva (north)
- Ities (south)
- Koukouli (east)
- Neo Souli (east)
- Perivola (east)
- Prosfygika (east)
- Psarofai (east)
- Tabachana (east)
- Glafkos (south)
- Zavlani (north)

Rio municipal unit:

- Agios Georgios Riou
- Agios Vasileios
- Aktaio
- Ano Kastritsi
- Arachovitika
- Kato Kastritsi
- Psathopyrgos

Paralia:

- Paralia
- Mintilogli
- Roitika

Messatida:

- Ovrya
- Kallithea
- Petroto
- Saravali

Vrachneika:

- Vrachnaiika
- Kaminia
- Monodendri
- Tsoukalaiika

== Geography ==
Patras is 215 km (134 mi) west of Athens by road, 94 km (58 mi) northeast of Pyrgos, 7 km (4.3 mi) south of Rio, 134 km (83 miles) west of Corinth, 77 km (48 miles) northwest of Kalavryta and 144 km (89 mi) northwest of Tripoli.

A central feature of the urban geography of Patras is its division into upper and lower sections. This is the result of an interplay between natural geography and human settlement patterns; the lower section of the city (Kato Poli), which includes the 19th-century urban core and the port, is adjacent to the sea and stretches between the estuaries of the rivers of Glafkos and Haradros. It is built on what was originally a bed of river soils and dried-up swamps. The older upper section (Ano Poli) covers the area of the pre-modern settlement, around the Fortress, on what is the last elevation of Mount Panachaikon (1,926 m (6,319 ft)) before the Gulf of Patras.

=== Hydrology ===
The largest river in the area is the Glafkos, flowing to the south of Patras. Glafkos springs in Mount Panachaikon and its water is, since 1925, collected in a small mountainous reservoir-dam near the village of Souli and subsequently pumped in order to provide energy for the country's first hydroelectric plant. Other smaller streams are Charadros, Meilichos, Kallinaos, Panagitsa and the mountain torrent Diakoniaris.

=== Climate ===
Patras, like much of Western Greece, has a hot-summer Mediterranean climate (Köppen climate classification: Csa). It features the typical mild, wet winters and hot, dry summers, with spring and autumn being pleasant transitional seasons. Autumn in Patras, however, is wetter than spring. Humidity is high during the winter months and lower during the summer. Snowfall is extremely rare in coastal areas but is more common and abundant in the surrounding mountains. Patras falls in 10b hardiness zone.

Climate data for Patras Port (2008-2025)
Month	Jan	Feb	Mar	Apr	May	Jun	Jul	Aug	Sep	Oct	Nov	Dec	Year
Record high °C (°F)	24.9 (76.8)	25.6 (78.1)	25.1 (77.2)	32.0 (89.6)	37.2 (99.0)	38.9 (102.0)	40.8 (105.4)	40.7 (105.3)	35.7 (96.3)	30.6 (87.1)	28.1 (82.6)	26.8 (80.2)	40.8 (105.4)
Mean daily maximum °C (°F)	14.2 (57.6)	14.9 (58.8)	16.2 (61.2)	19.6 (67.3)	23.1 (73.6)	27.4 (81.3)	30.4 (86.7)	31.5 (88.7)	27.4 (81.3)	23.5 (74.3)	19.8 (67.6)	16.0 (60.8)	22.0 (71.6)
Daily mean °C (°F)	11.8 (53.2)	12.4 (54.3)	13.7 (56.7)	16.9 (62.4)	20.3 (68.5)	24.6 (76.3)	27.4 (81.3)	28.4 (83.1)	24.8 (76.6)	20.8 (69.4)	17.2 (63.0)	13.6 (56.5)	19.3 (66.8)
Mean daily minimum °C (°F)	9.4 (48.9)	9.9 (49.8)	11.1 (52.0)	14.1 (57.4)	17.6 (63.7)	21.7 (71.1)	24.4 (75.9)	25.2 (77.4)	22.2 (72.0)	18.0 (64.4)	14.6 (58.3)	11.2 (52.2)	16.6 (61.9)
Record low °C (°F)	1.2 (34.2)	−0.9 (30.4)	2.3 (36.1)	8.2 (46.8)	11.9 (53.4)	15.0 (59.0)	19.3 (66.7)	20.1 (68.2)	15.8 (60.4)	9.2 (48.6)	7.4 (45.3)	3.0 (37.4)	−0.9 (30.4)
Average rainfall mm (inches)	108.1 (4.26)	67.9 (2.67)	71.2 (2.80)	36.2 (1.43)	22.4 (0.88)	15.5 (0.61)	5.0 (0.20)	6.8 (0.27)	41.5 (1.63)	84.0 (3.31)	111.1 (4.37)	116.0 (4.57)	685.7 (27)
Source 1: National Observatory of Athens Monthly Bulletins (Jan 2008 - Jan 2025)
Source 2: Patras N.O.A station

=== Ecology ===
Of great importance for the biological diversity of the area and the preservation of its climate is the swamp of Agyia, a small and coastal aquatic ecosystem of only 30 ha (74 acres), north of the city centre. The main features of this wetland are its apparent survival difficulty, being at the heart of a densely populated urban centre that features a relatively arid climate and its admittedly high level of biodiversity, with over 90 species of birds being observed until the early 1990s, according to a study by the Patras Bureau of the Hellenic Ornithological Society.

== Government ==
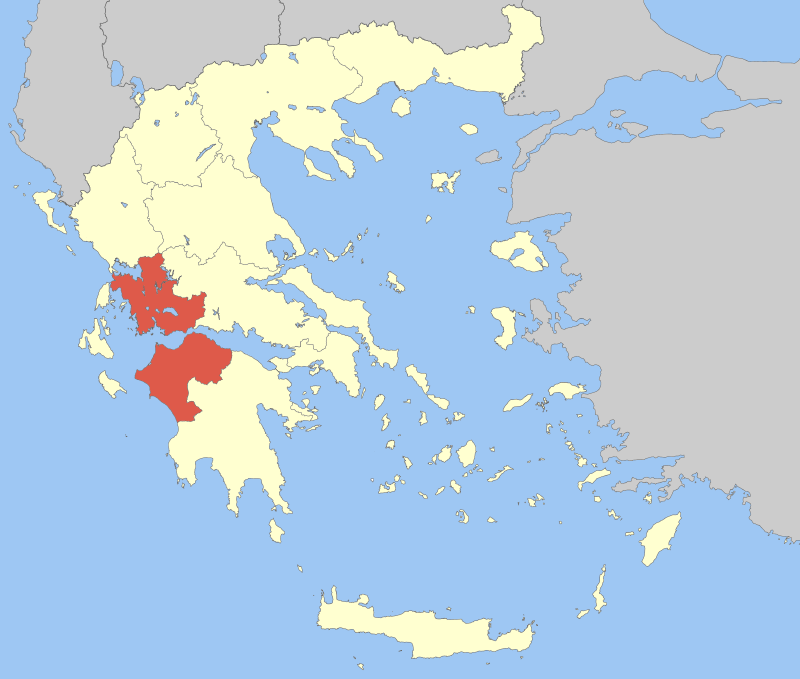
Administrative region of Western Greece.

Patras is the regional capital of Western Greece and the capital of the Achaea regional unit. Since 2011, the city is also the capital of the administrative division, which includes (along with Western Greece) the regions of Peloponnese and the Ionian Islands.

=== Municipality ===
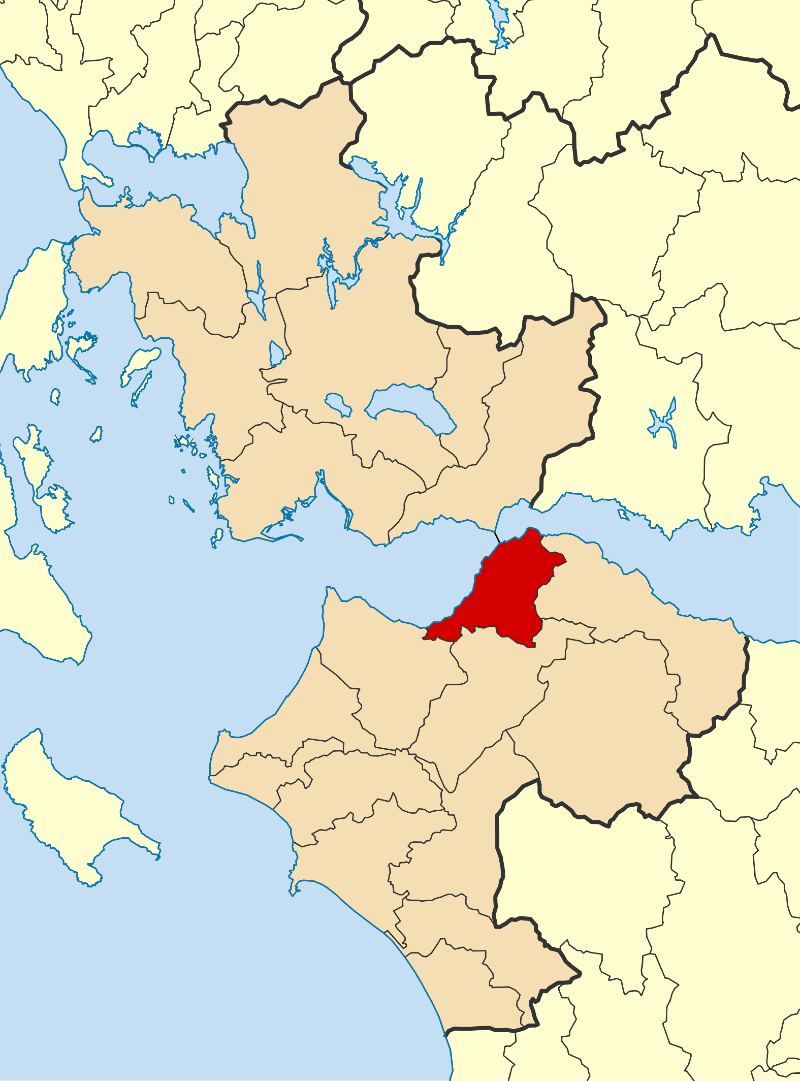
Patras municipality within the region of Western Greece.

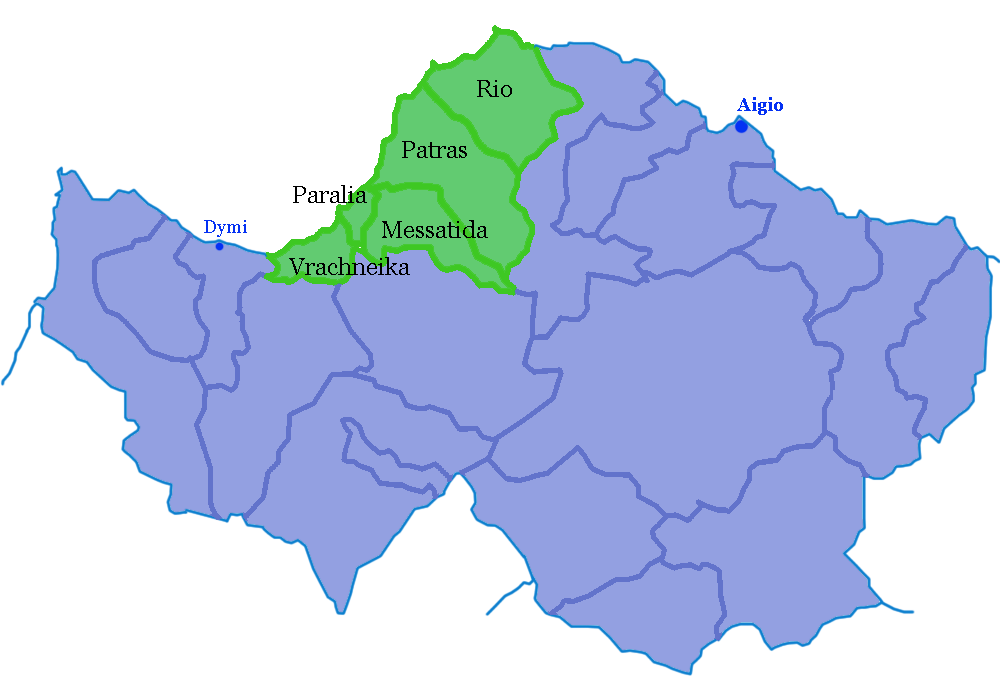
Patras municipality (in green, Dimos Patreon) and its municipal units within the regional unit of Achaea.

The current municipality of Patras was formed at the 2011 local government reform by the merger of 5 municipalities that made up the Patras Urban Area. These former municipalities, which became municipal units, are: (in parentheses their population, 2011)

- Messatida (13,852)
- Paralia (9,987)
- Patras (170,896)
- Rio (14,034)
- Vrachnaiika (4,627)

The municipality has an area of 334.858 km^{2} (129 sq mi), the municipal unit 125.420 km^{2} (48 sq mi).

== Demographics ==
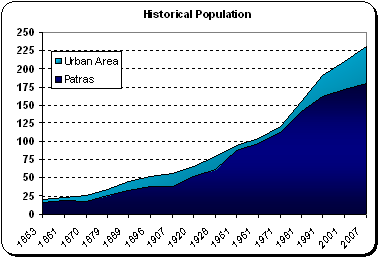
Population of Patras (dark blue) and urban area of Patras (blue) from 1853 to 2007.

The following list presents demographic data on the municipality of Patras over the years 2012.

Historical population

Year	Pop.	±%
1853	15,854	—
1861	18,342	+15.7%
1870	16,641	−9.3%
1879	25,494	+53.2%
1889	33,529	+31.5%
1896	37,985	+13.3%

Year	Pop.	±%
1907	37,728	−0.7%
1920	52,174	+38.3%
1928	61,278	+17.4%
1951	87,570	+42.9%
1961	96,100	+9.7%
1971	112,228	+16.8%

Year	Pop.	±%
1981	142,163	+26.7%
1991	161,782	+13.8%
2001	171,616	+6.1%
2007	180,000	+4.9%
2011	213,984	+18.9%
2021	215,922	+0.9%

From 2011 on, can data also reflect the city's urban area population, as all the municipalities that made up the Patras Urban Area were joined to create the new larger Patras municipality, formed at the 2011 local government reform.

== Infrastructure ==
Heavy infrastructure works performed in the 2000s include the Peiros-Parapeiros dam (to provide water supply for Patras and surrounding towns) and a "small industries" park that will be constructed next to the Glaykos river and provide an easy connection with the new port.

The city is one of the main Greek internet and GRNET hubs and is connected with high speed lines to Athens as part of the backbone. A metropolitan optical network will be deployed in the city, with a total length of 48 km (30 mi).

Two major state hospitals operate in the city: the Agios Andreas Hospital is the oldest of the two; and General University Hospital of Patras. There also exists two smaller state hospitals, Karamandanio - a children's hospital, and the Center of Chest Diseases of Southwestern Greece. A large range of private hospitals and clinics operate in parallel.

Numerous art venues and an ultra-modern archaeological museum were constructed for the needs of European Culture Capital designation. The cultural and educational facilities include the Municipal Library, the university libraries, many theatres, the municipal art gallery, the University of Patras's facilities, the Hellenic Open University and the Technical Institute of Patras. A number of research facilities are also established in the university campus area.

== Economy ==
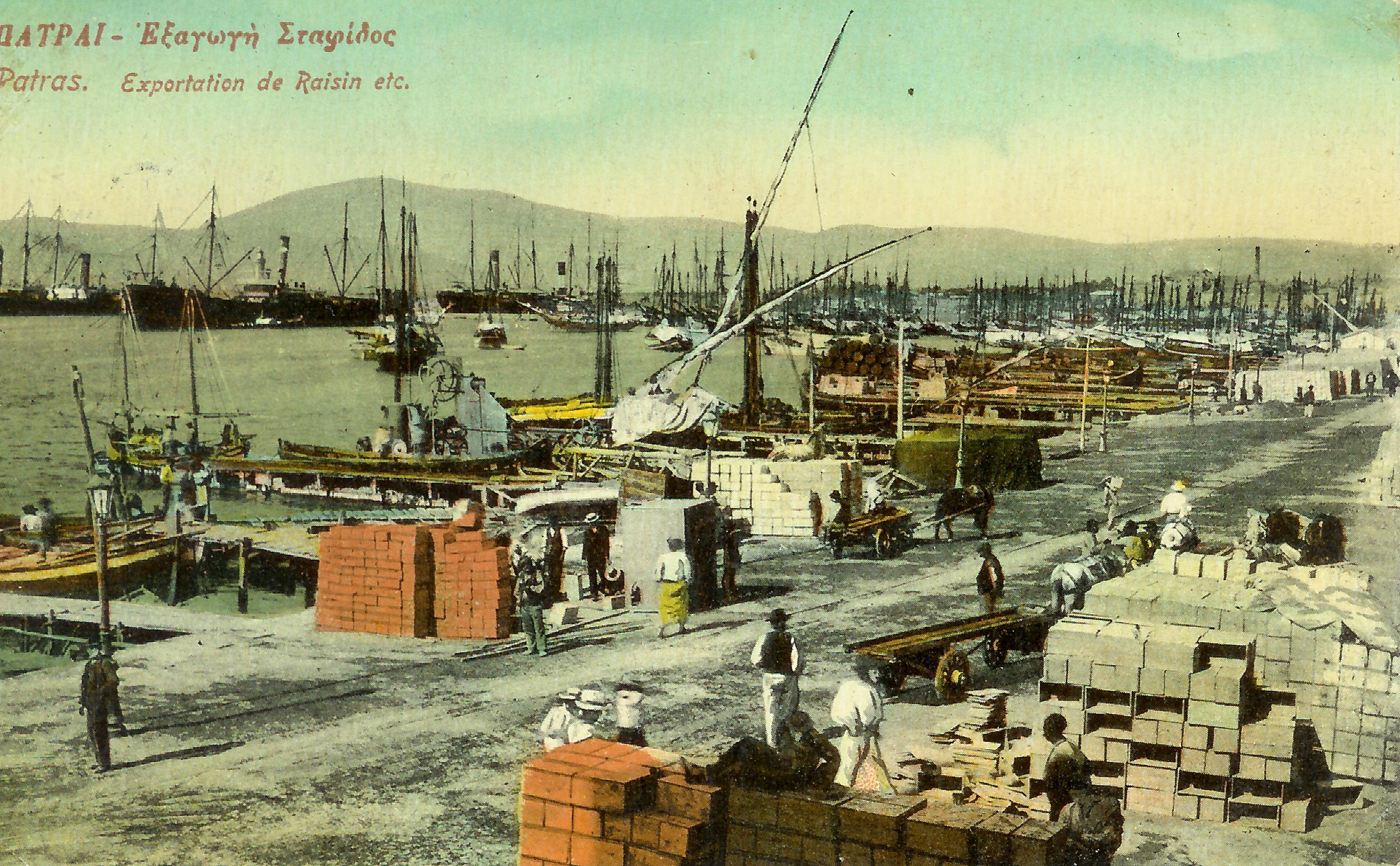
Raisin exports; port of Patras, 19th century.

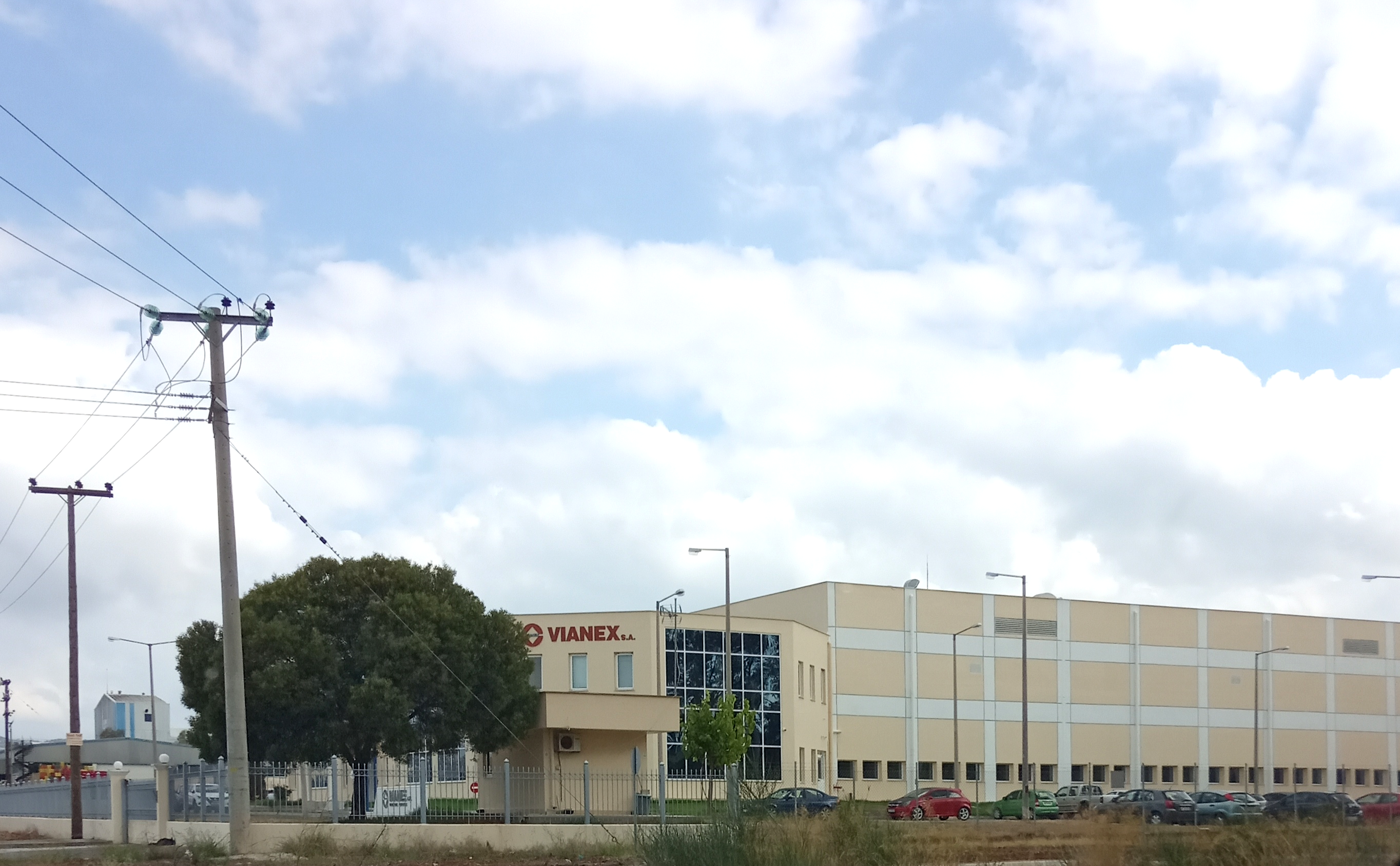
Vianex factory D in the industrial zone of Patras

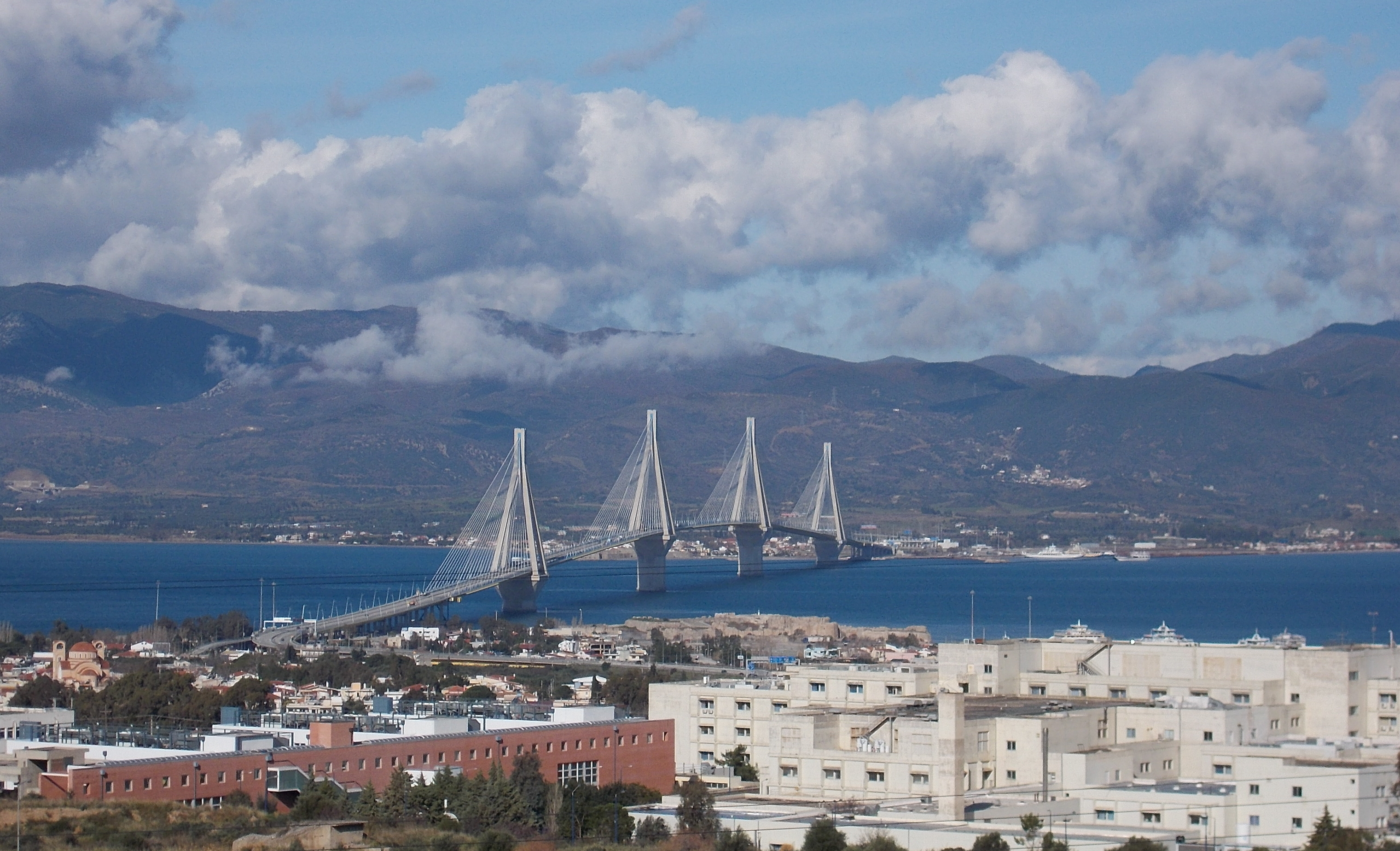
University of Patras buildings with the Rio-Antirio bridge in the background.

The economy of the city largely depends on its service sector.

The area still retains some of its traditional winemaking and foodstuff industries as well as a small agricultural sector. Major businesses in Patras include:

=== Services sector ===
Most Greek banks have their regional headquarters for Western Greece in Patras.

In 2010, the new Infocenter of Patras was established, inside the neoclassical building of the former market "Agora Argyri", in Ayiou Andreou street. The building includes a conference hall, along with multi-purpose and exhibitional spaces. The regional unit of Achaea has about 4,800 hotels rooms and in 2006, 286,000 tourists, mainly from Greece, stayed in the area for a total of 634,000 days.

=== Manufacturing sector ===
Patras still has a large manufacturing base for a variety of industries.

The Titan Cement Company operates a large cement factory, with a private port, in Psathopyrgos, a suburb of Patras.

Patras hosts several timber manufacturing companies, and a wood distribution center of Shelman. The largest local company is Abex. The paper sector is also active including a paper factory belonging to Georgia-Pacific (Delica) and two important Greek companies, Elite and El-pack, headquartered in the city.

Patras has several packing and industrial equipment companies. The most important of them are the local Antzoulatos and the multinational Frigoglass, a subsidiary of Coca-Cola, headquartered in the suburbs of Patras. Ideal Bikes is the leading bike producer in Greece, with large export activities.

The once omnipresent textile industry of the city is now almost defunct after the shut-down of the huge factory of Peiraiki-Patraiki (Πειραϊκή-Πατραϊκή), followed by numerous smaller textile industries. The remains of the facilities still cover hundreds of acres in the south side of the city.

=== Food ===
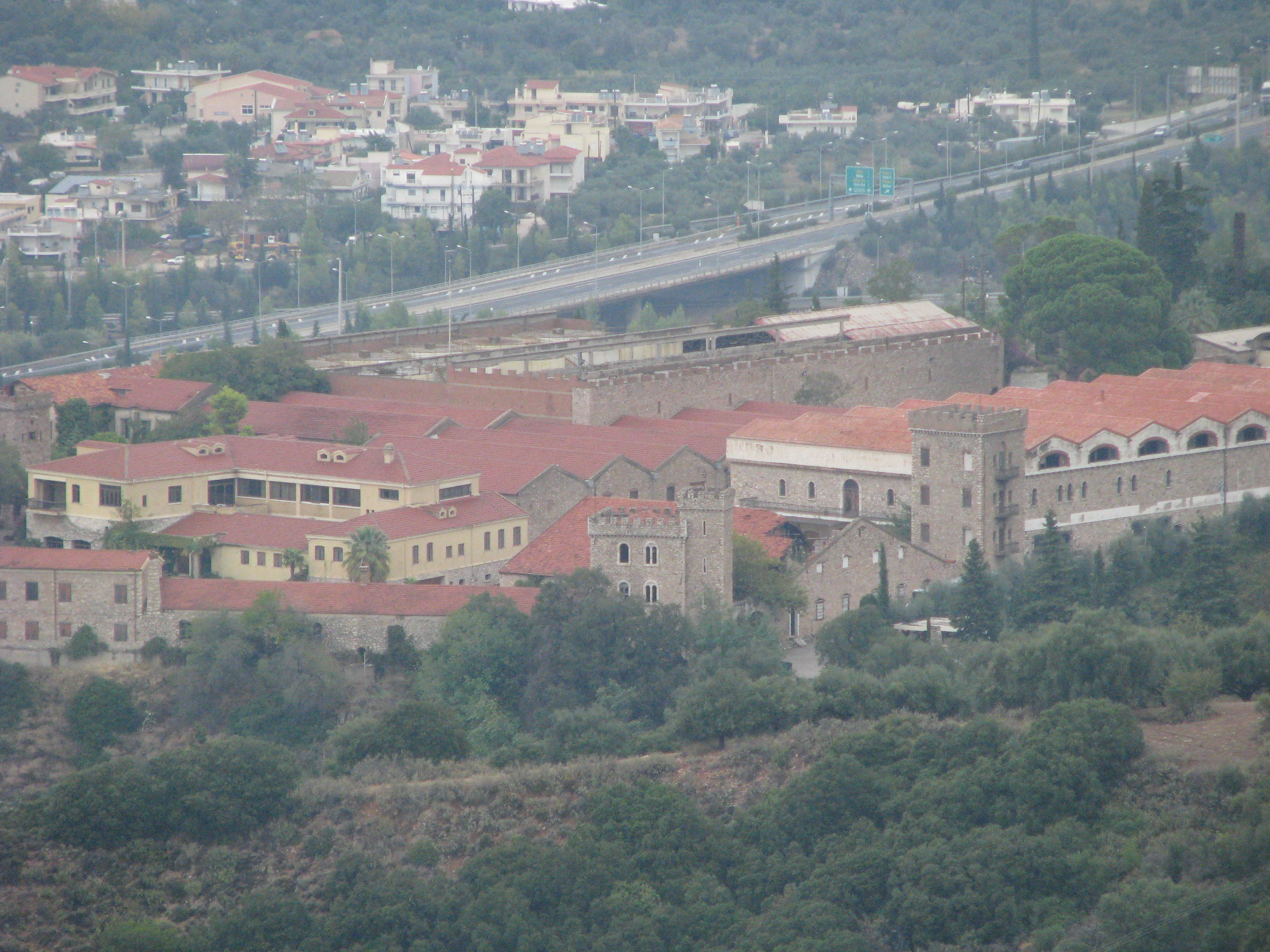
The Achaia Clauss wine factory, founded in 1861 by Gustav Clauss, famous for its Mavrodaphne.

Some of the largest industries in the city belong to the soft drinks and drinks sector. There are factories from Coca-Cola HBC and Athenian Brewery established in area, along with the facilities of the largest local company in soft-drinks production, Loux (ΛΟΥΞ). The city is also home to many leading Greek wineries and distilleries, among them the venerable Achaia Clauss and Parparoussi located in Rio. In the food sector, Friesland Foods, through the local subsidiary NoyNoy, operates a new yogurt factory in the city's industrial area. Patras is also home to important fish-farming companies (Andromeda, Nireus). ECOFEED operates in the industrial zone of Patras, the largest fish-feeds factory in the Mediterranean. The city hosts the second-largest flour-mills in Greece, Kepenou-Mills.

=== Energy sector ===
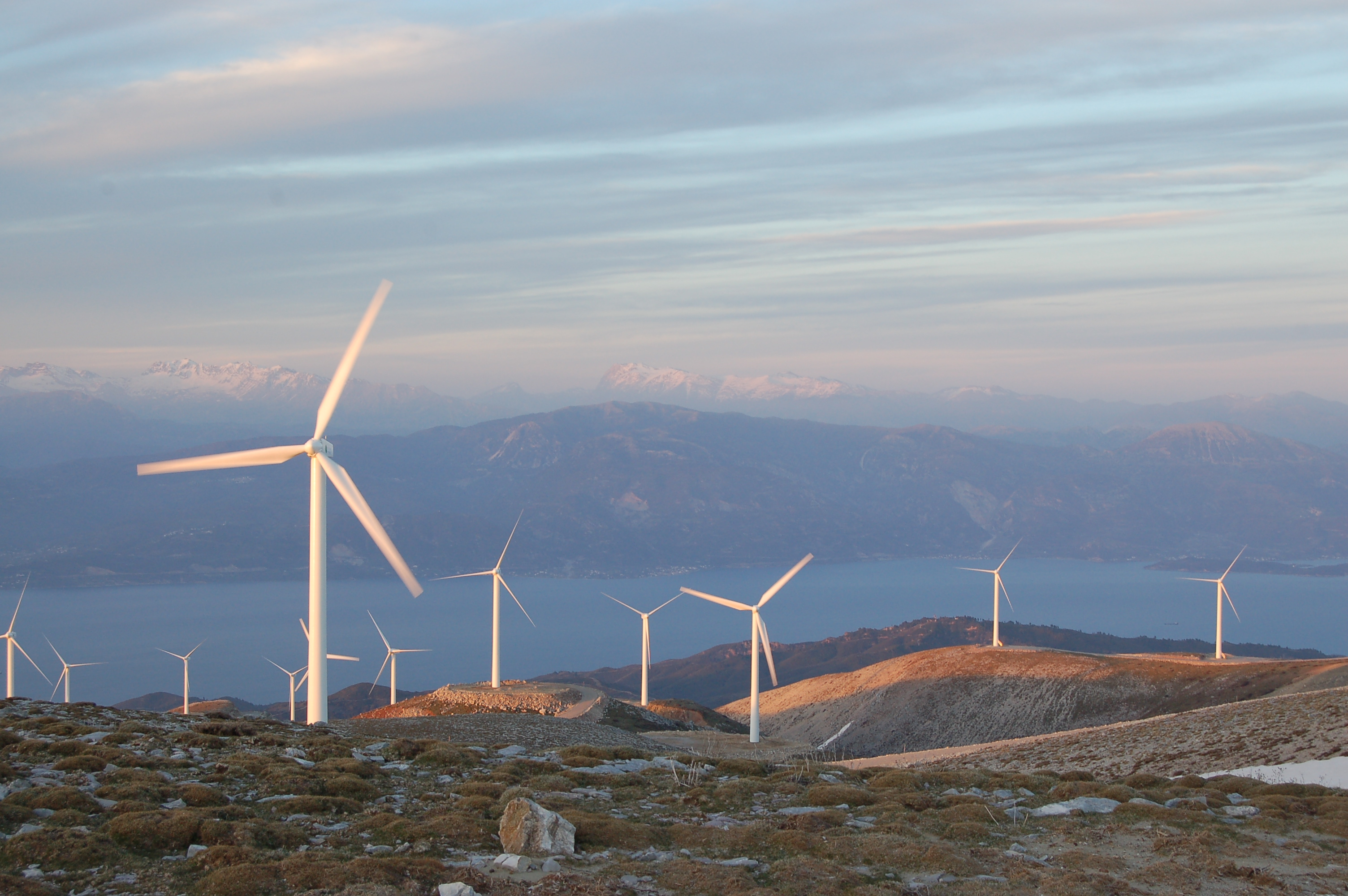
View of the wind park on Panachaiko mountain.

Acciona has completed the largest wind park in Greece, on the Panachaiko mountain, overlooking the city of Patras. The Public Electric Company, operates a small hydroelectric plant on river Glafkos.

=== IT sector ===
Intracom (Greece's largest multinational provider of telecommunications products) facilities in Patras house the offices of Telecommunications Software Development, Terminal Equipment Design, Development Programmes, and Support Services divisions. Expansion plans have recently been completed. INTRASOFT, another core company of INTRACOM holdings group, has recently (2018) began operations in Patras and it is expected to expand its activities in 2019. The Corallia Innovation Hub, Innohub hosts many companies focusing on Microelectronics. Among them one of the largest is the multinational software company Citrix Systems which operates a R&D centre with more than 100 computer scientists and engineers. Another company that maintains an R&D center in Patras is Dialog Semiconductor, a UK-based manufacturer of semiconductor-based system solutions. Another large Greek IT company, Unisystems announced recently (October 2018) the signing of a cooperation agreement with the Patras-based IT company Knowledge SA, that lays the foundation for the establishment of a Remote Development Center in Patras.

=== Research and technology ===
Patras Science Park is an incubator for many small but upcoming technology companies. CBL Patras, a global manufacturer of specialty chemicals and active pharmaceutical ingredients, is a startup from a professor of the University of Patras.

Vianex, owned by Pavlos Giannakopoulos, has its largest production facilities in the industrial area of the city.

Nobacco, a Greek electronic cigarette brand, works mainly with cooperation with the university of Patras.

There has been a significant development in the R&D sector, in the last few years, as a result of the many research institutes and the university impact in the area. The Computer Technology Institute and the Industrial Systems Institute of Greece are headquartered in Patras. The city is also a host to the FORTH-ICE-HT (Institute of Chemical Engineering & High Temperature Chemical Processes) and the Institute of Biomedical Technology.

== Media ==
Press

- I Imera
- Kosmos tis Patras
- Peloponnisos (newspaper)
- Symvoulos Epicheiriseon (financial)
- Sport Week (sports)

Television

- Achaia Channel
- Ionian TV
- Super B

== Culture ==
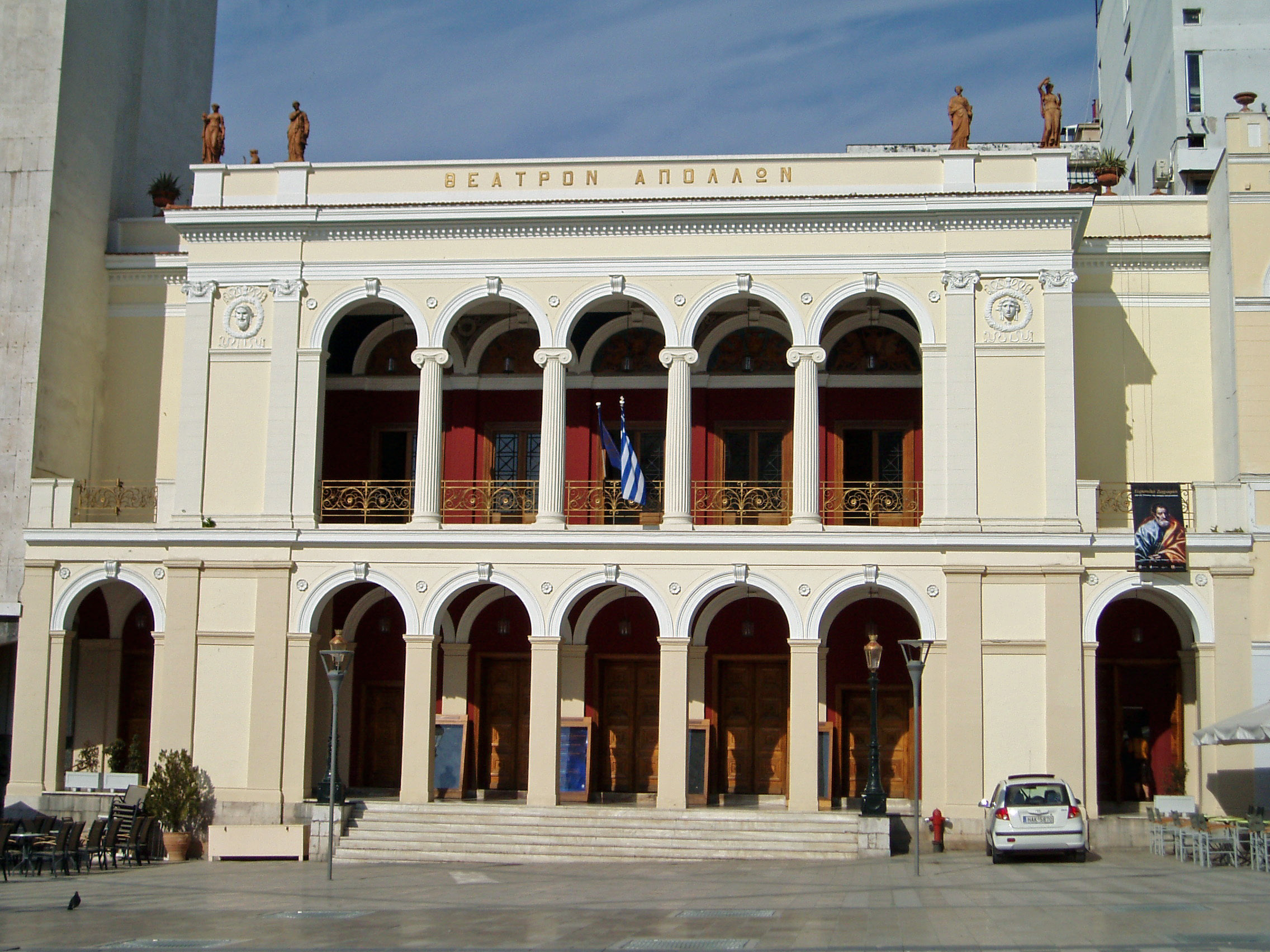
Apollon Theatre, designed by Ernst Ziller.

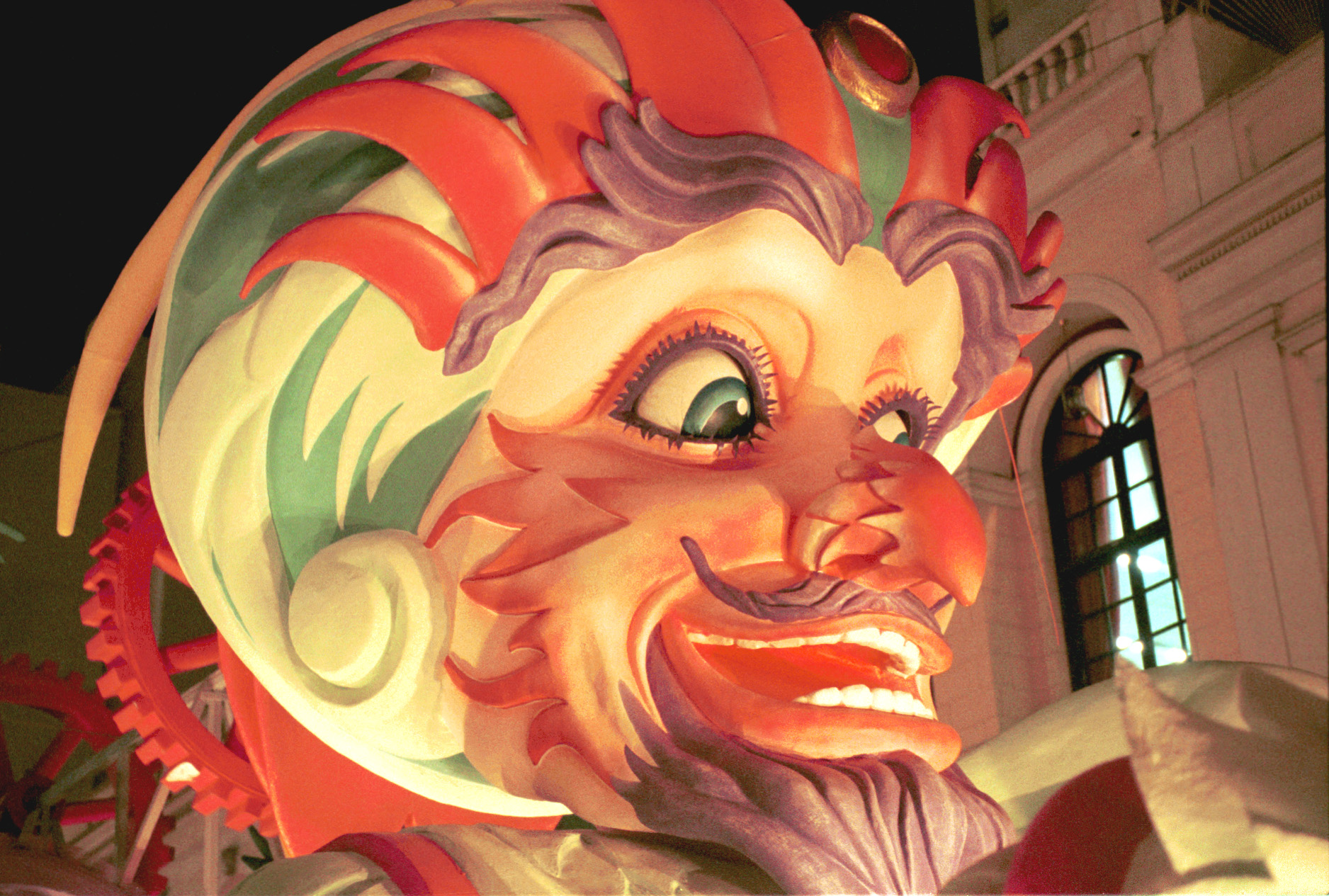
Patras Carnival; the float of the "King of the Carnival".

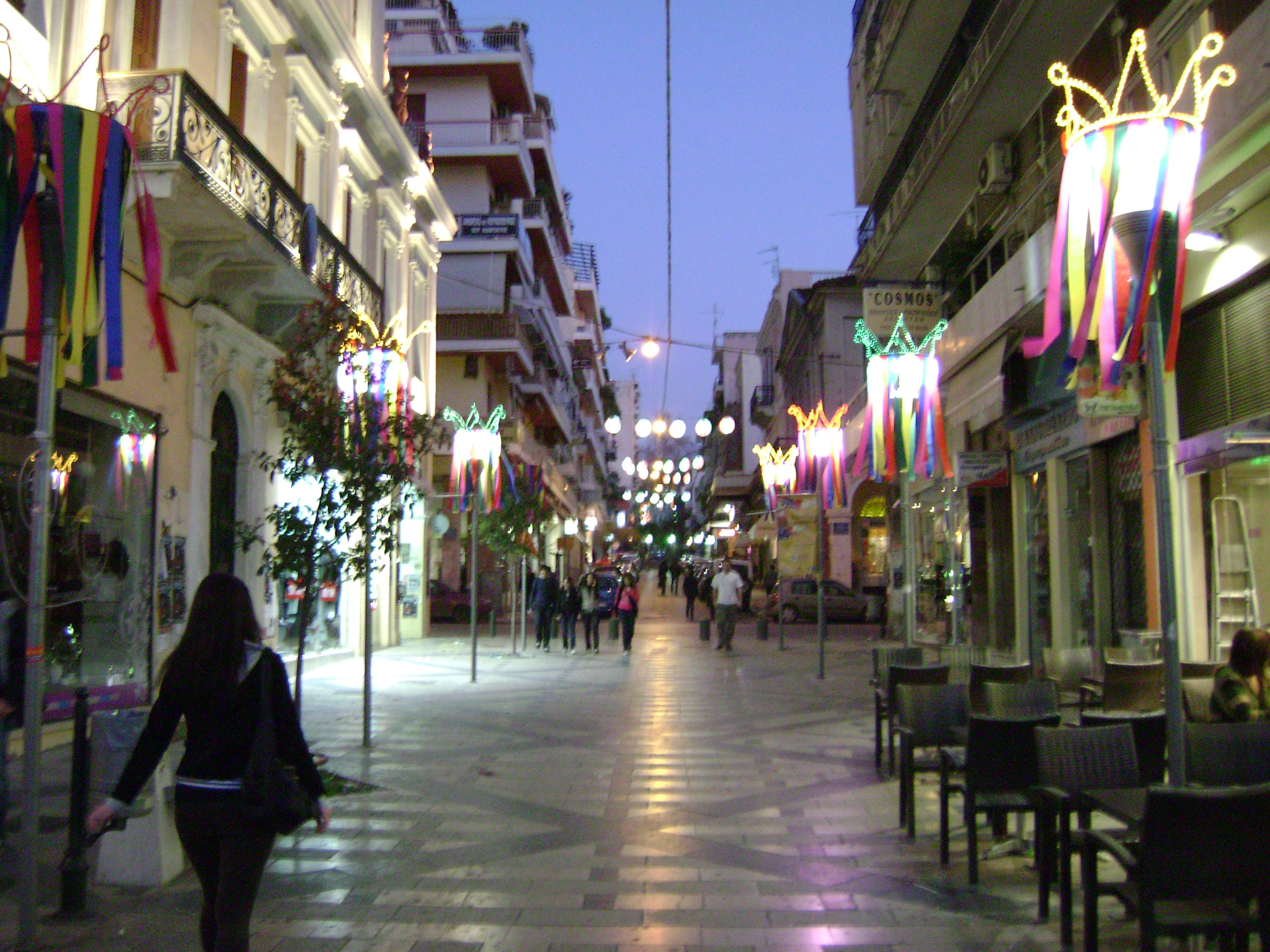
Gerokostopoulou street during the Patras Carnival.

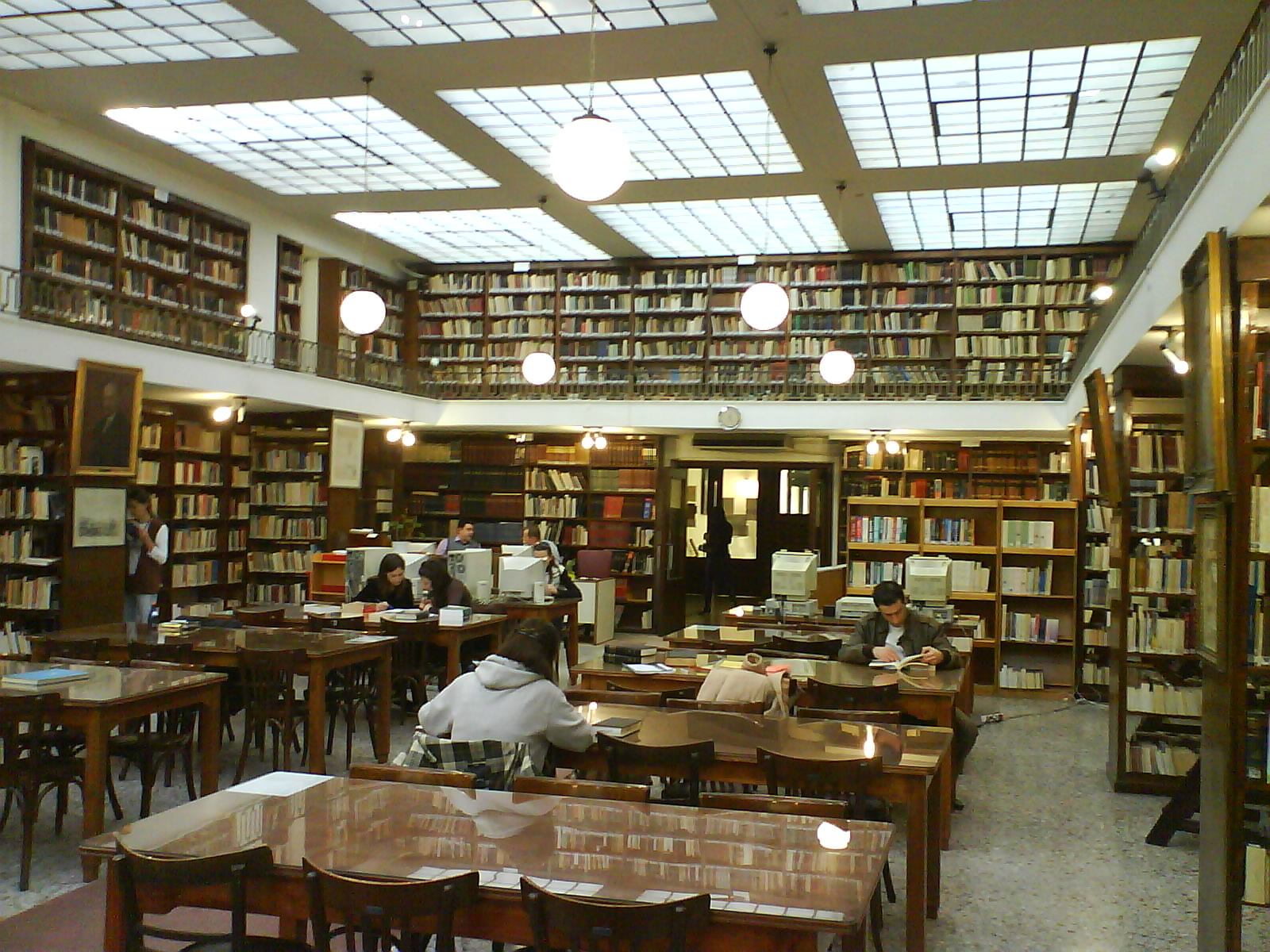
Inside the municipal library.

The cultural activity of Patras includes the Patras International Festival (with various artistic activities, mainly in the fields of theatre and music), the Patras Carnival and the Poetry Symposium.

The city hosts many museums, including the Patras Archaeological Museum the History and Ethnology Museum, the Folk Art Museum, the Press Museum and the Technology Museum, the latter in the campus of Patras University.

Other cultural institutes are: the Visual Arts Workshop, the icon painting school, the Carnival Float Workshop, the Municipal Library, the Municipal Gallery, along with many private art galleries. The architectural heritage of the city is dominated by neo-classicism, but also includes structures from other periods. Patras is also a pilot city of the Council of Europe and EU Intercultural cities programme.

=== Theatrical tradition and music ===
The Patras Municipal and Regional Theatre was founded in June 1988, having as its main stage the city's landmark, the Apollon Theatre. Throughout its existence it has mounted critically acclaimed performances ranging from ancient dramaturgy and modern Greek, to international repertoire. The theatre cooperates with other theatrical groups, such as the Viomichaniki (Industrial) group and the Michani Technis (Art Machine).

The Roman Odeon hosts ancient dramas in the summer, while the Pantheon theater, the Art Factory, the Lithographeion and the Agora theatres provide additional venues. The International Festival of Patras takes place every summer, with a program consisting mostly of plays—both ancient drama and modern theatre—as well as various musical events.

Patras has also an indie rock scene with bands such as Raining Pleasure, Abbie Gale, Serpentine, Doch an Doris and others.

=== Carnival ===
The Patras Carnival (Patrino Karnavali) is the largest event of its kind in Greece and one of the biggest in Europe, with a heritage reaching back 160 years. The events begin on 17 January each year (St. Anthony's nameday), and last until Clean Monday. Hundreds of thousands of visitors from all over the world gather each year for its festivities, which include large events such as the mammoth sized parades of the last two weeks (up to 50.000 participants each), the Hidden Treasure Hunt (Krymmenos Thisavros), concerts, expositions, theatrical, musical, comedy and other artistic contests and events. Patras Carnival was originally introduced as ball-masquee' events in 1835 by the Italian origin merchant family of Moretti.

=== European Capital of Culture 2006 ===
Patras 2006 commemorative coin.

Patras was chosen by the European Commission to be the European Capital of Culture for the year 2006. The concept of the event revolved around the main theme of "Bridges" and "Dialogues", drawing benefit from the city's rich history and its position as a "Gate to the West", to underline the essence of the productive interaction of culture and civilisations in Europe. The EU Commission found Patras's plans very ambitious and also commented that a successful hosting of the title by a medium-sized city would make it possible to redefine the meaning of the term Cultural Capital.

The Selection Panel for 2006 noted in its final report:

The current cultural activity of the city includes the Patras International Festival (various artistic activities, mainly in the field of music), the Patras Carnival and the Poetry Symposium (organised each year for the 25 years by an ad hoc committee at the University of Patras). The Patras 2006 proposal focuses on two central ideas: "bridges" and "dialogues". Cultural managers from Patras and the general public will be involved in developing these ideas. Further, four poles/programmes of cultural attraction will be developed. The first, "A city for Europe", will relate to the architectural heritage, the industrial revolution and similar subjects. "The counterpart cities" programme will be developed in the fields of human and social sciences and in diverse artistic fields. "The three sea battles" will present a cultural programme focusing on peace and understanding. The last theme, "The many homelands", is directly linked to the etymology of the name of the city. This programme will among other things concentrate on art workshops, the transfer of know-how, way of life and entertainment.

In 2006 various cultural events were held in the context of the European Capital of Culture. Among the artists presenting their work in Patras were: Gary Burton, Maxim Shostakovich, Ian Anderson - with the Patras Municipal Orchestra, Jean Louis Trintignant, Roberto Benigni, Eros Ramazzotti and José Carreras. With the completion of the Capital of Culture programme, a part of the old Ladopoulos factory was renovated to host exhibitions, a small theatre (named the Art Factory), was built and a number of neoclassical buildings around the city were renovated as part of a plan to preserve the city's architectural heritage and link it to its cultural life. The new Archaeological museum was completed in 2009. Its globe-like roof and modern architectural design enhances the town's northern entrance, taking its place among the other city landmarks.

=== Sports ===
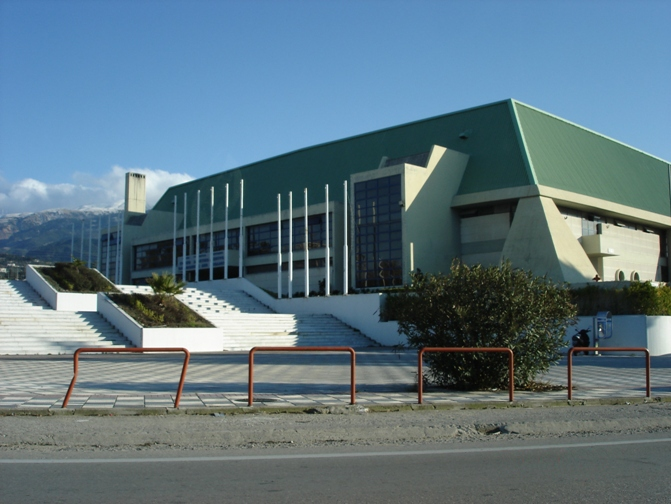
Dimitris Tofalos Arena

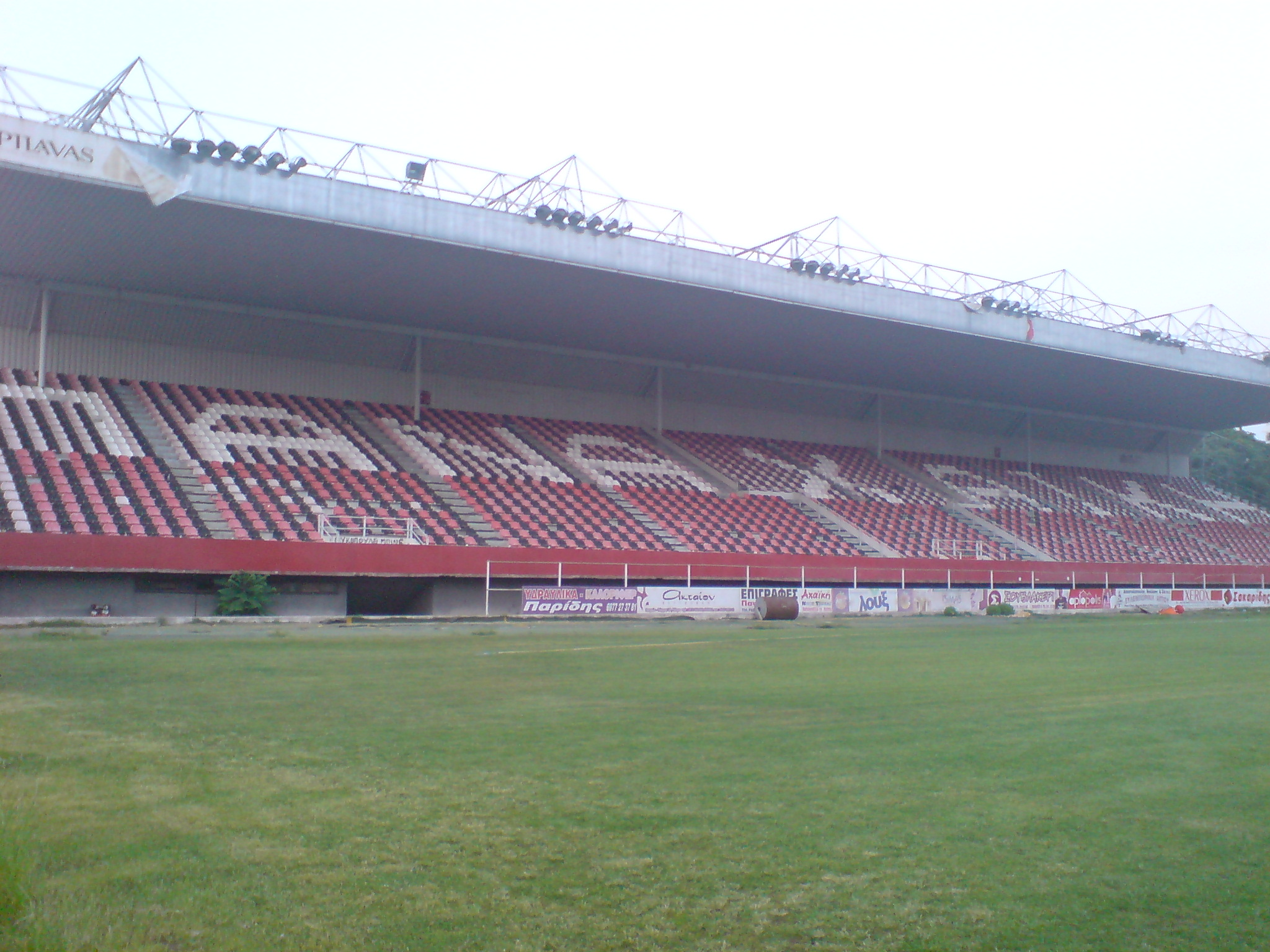
Kostas Davourlis Stadium of Panachaiki G.E.

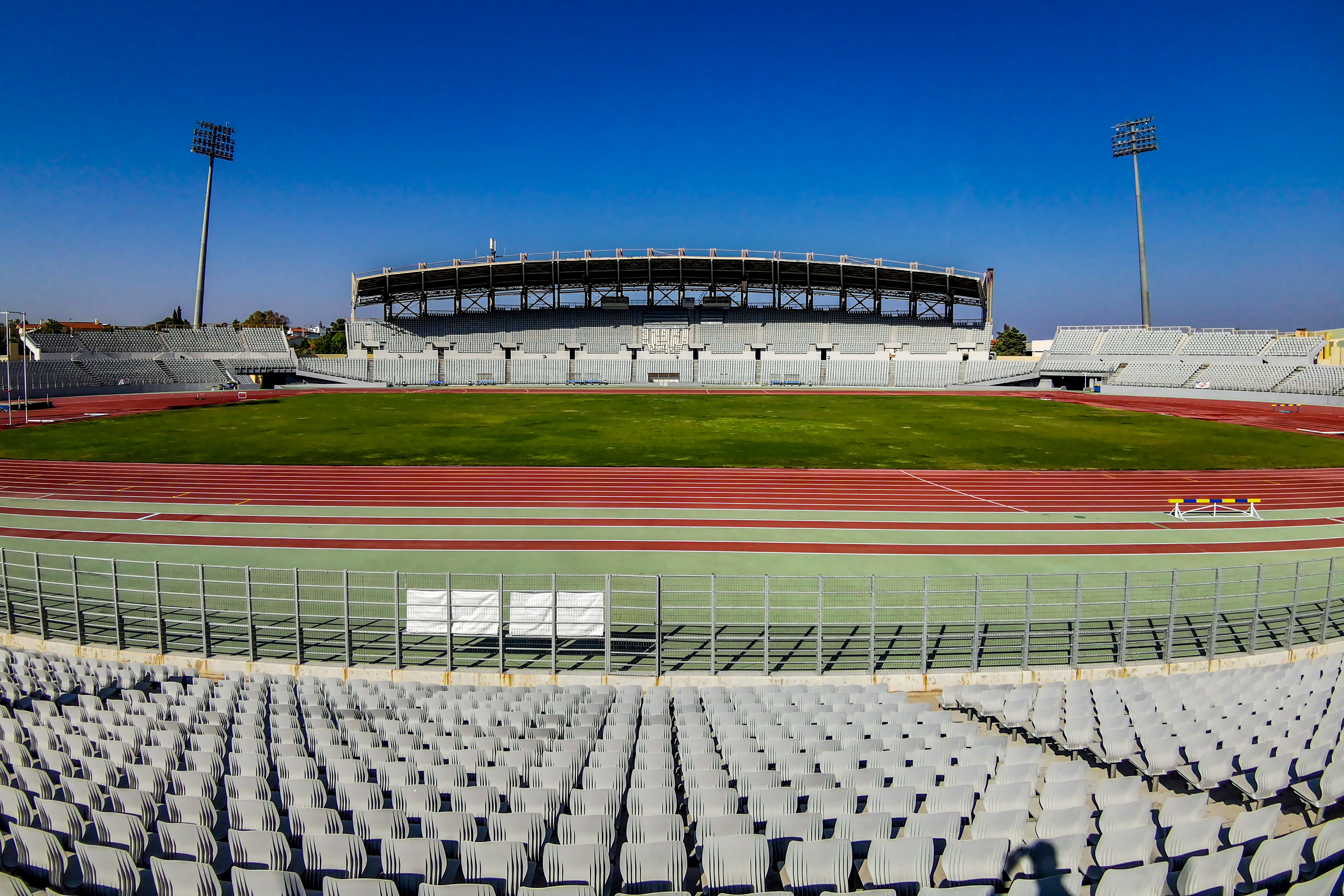
Pampeloponnisiako Stadium.

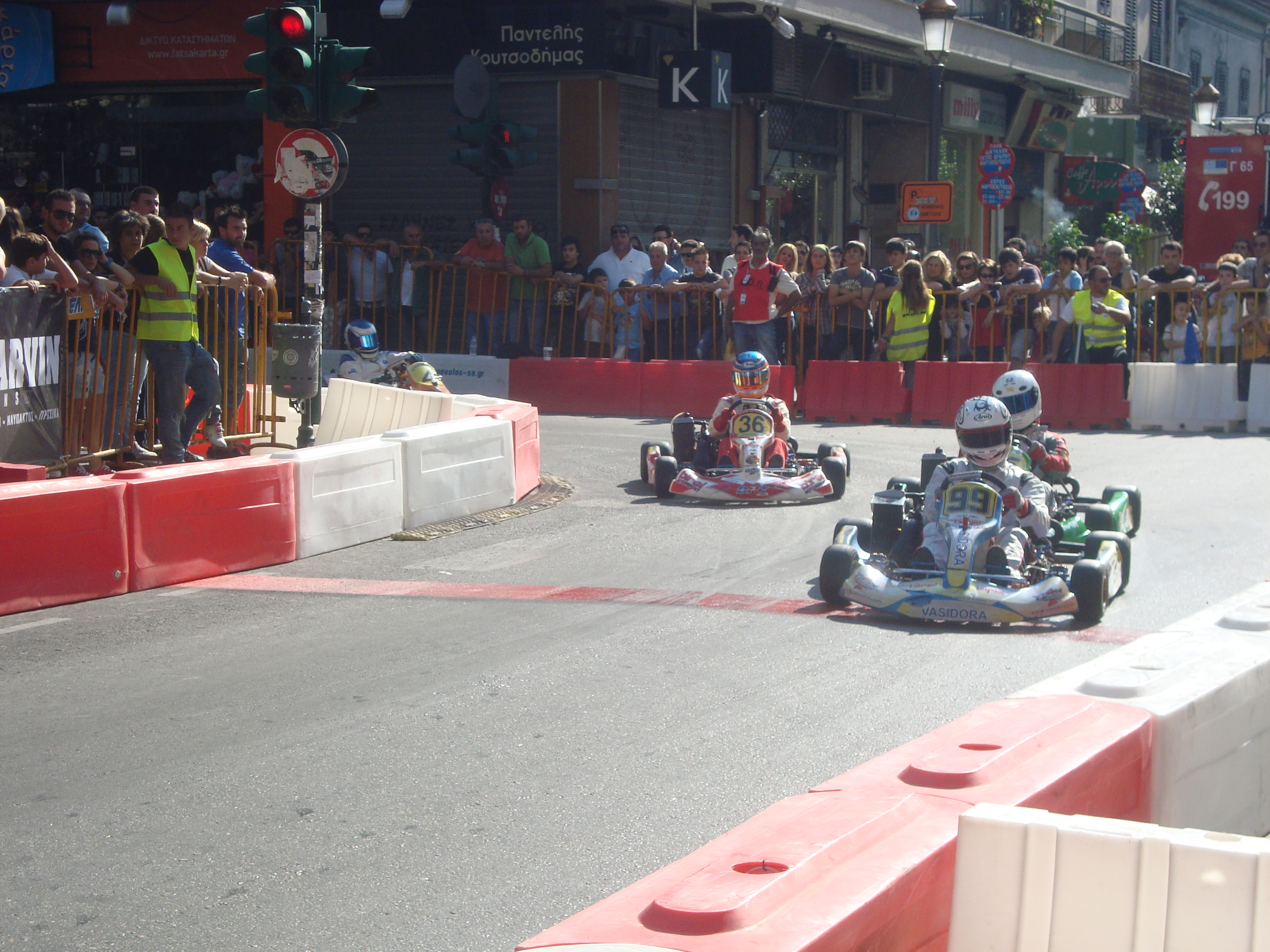
Patras International Circuit for kart racing.

Patras has several sports facilities and important teams in almost all the major Greek leagues. Panachaiki Gymnastiki Enosi, Apollon Patras, E.A. Patras and NO Patras are historically the major sports clubs based in the city, specialising in football, basketball, volleyball and water polo. The city's national stadium, Pampeloponnisiako Stadium, was renovated and expanded in 2004. Since 2009, a new event, the Patras International Circuit Kart takes place every September, turning the city streets into a circuit.

The city has hosted several international sports events, such as the 1995 Basketball Under-19 World Cup (preliminaries), the 1995 Men's European Volleyball Championship (preliminaries), the 1997 Rhythmic Gymnastics European Championships, the 2001 World Wrestling Championships, the EuroBasket 2003 Women, the 2003 International Children's Games, a group stage of the football tournament in the 2004 Olympic Games, the 2007 World Rhythmic Gymnastics Championships, the 2008 World Deaf Football Championships and the 2019 Mediterranean Beach Games.

Notable sport clubs based in Patras
Club	Sport	Current league	Venue	Location	Capacity	Established	Highest ranking
Panachaiki G.E.	Football	Super League 2	Kostas Davourlis Stadium	Agyia	11,321	1891	4th (1973)
Panachaiki G.E.	Volleyball	Volleyball League	Panachaiki Indoor Arena	Agyia	500	1928	8th (2016)
Apollon Patras	Basketball	Basket League	Apollon Patras Indoor Hall	Perivola	3,500	1926	6th (1986)
E.A. Patras	Volleyball	A2 Ethniki	EAP Indoor Hall	Agios Dionysios	2,200	1927	Champion (1938)
NO Patras	Water polo	A1 Ethniki	NOP Aquatic Centre	Akti Dymeon	3,000	1929	Champion (x 8)
Thyella	Football	Delta Ethniki	Fotis Aravantinos Stadium	Glafkos	3,000	1930	5th (B Ethniki)
Olympiada Patras	Basketball; Volleyball	A2 League; A2 Ethniki	Olympiada Indoor Hall	Taraboura	2,500	1961	8th (2002); 10th (2007)
Promitheas Patras	Basketball	Basket League	Dimitris Tofalos Arena	Bozaitika	4,500	1985	2nd (2019)
Ormi Patras	Handball	A1 Women's	National Indoor Hall	Koukouli	1,000	2003	Champion (x 6)
NE Patras	Water polo	A2 Ethniki; A1 Women's	Antonis Pepanos Aquatic Centre	Koukouli	4,000	2006	4th (2009); 4th (x 3)

=== Religion ===
The Anglican Church of Saint Andrew.

The city is the seat of the Greek Orthodox Metropolis of Patras. As in the rest of the country, the largest denomination is the Orthodox Church, which represents the majority of the population. There is also a sizeable community of Roman Catholics and an Anglican church, part of the Church of England's Diocese in Europe.

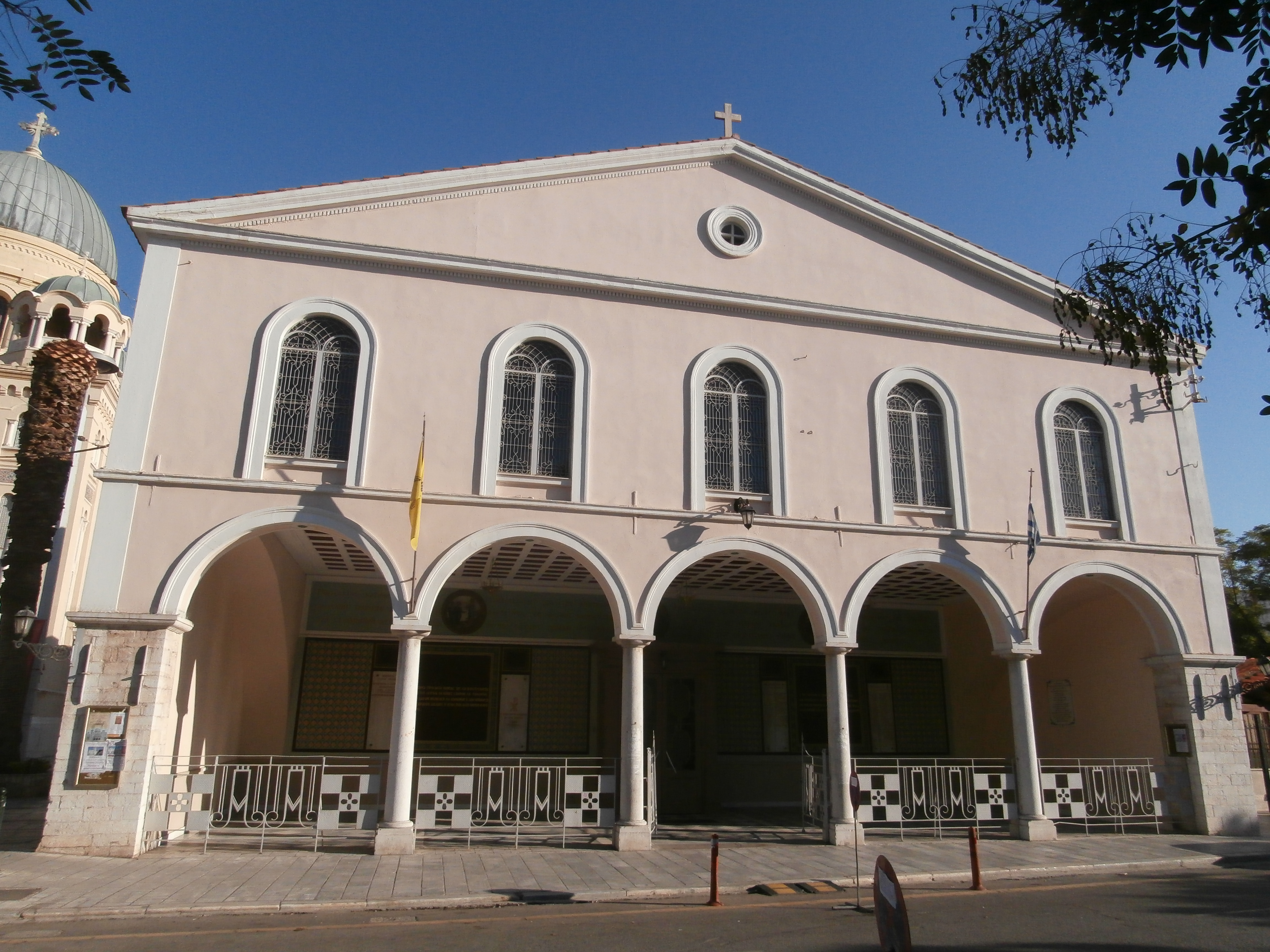
The old Orthodox church of Saint Andrew, next to the Cathedral

The most significant church in the city is the Orthodox Cathedral Church of Saint Andrew, in the south west of the city center. The construction of the church began in 1908 under the supervision of the architect Anastasios Metaxas, followed by Georgios Nomikos. It was inaugurated in 1974. It is the largest church in Greece and the third-largest Byzantine-style church in the Balkans, after the Cathedral of Saint Sava in Belgrade and Alexander Nevsky Cathedral in Sofia. It holds relics of Andrew the Apostle, which were returned to the city of Patras from St. Peter's Basilica, Rome in September, 1964, on the orders of Pope Paul VI. Other historical churches of the city are:

- The church of Pantokrator (1832), the old cathedral, in the upper town district
- The Metropolitan Church of Patras (1846) dedicated to Panayia Evangelistria, on Maisonos Street
- The church of Ayios Nikolaos (1885), next to the steps of Ayiou Nikolaou street
- The church of Pantanassa (1859), Ipsilanti street
- The church of Ayios Dimitrios, in the upper town district
- The Catholic Church of Saint Andrew (1937), on Maisonos Street
- The Anglican church of Saint Andrew (1878), on Odos Agiou Andreou
- The old church of Ayios Andreas (1836–1843), next to the new temple. Situated in the site of Andrew the Apostle's martyrdom, it was built in basilica style by the architect Lysandros Kaftanzoglou.
- Girokomiou Monastery (Holy Monastery of Panagia Girokomitissa): This historic monastery was founded in the 10th century AD in the eastern part of Patras. It was built on the ruins of an ancient temple of the goddess Artemis and for this reason the monastery's cathedral is dedicated to Saint Artemiοs. It is obvious that the monastery maintained a nursing home during the Byzantine period.
- Monastery of Agios Nikolaos Bala (Paleomonastiro): Ιt is built at the foot of Panachaikos, at an altitude of 500 meters, near the village of Bala, 8 km (5.0 mi) northeast of Patras. This historic and picturesque monastery was founded at the end of the 17th century. A marble slab on the north outer side of the Cathedral tells of the restoration of the monastery in 1693. The monastery has also recently been renovated, numbering nineteen nuns and celebrating 6 December and 10 May.

The patron saint of Patras is Saint Andrew the Apostle. One of the modern saints is Saint Gervasios Paraskevopoulos of Patras (2023)

=== Cuisine ===
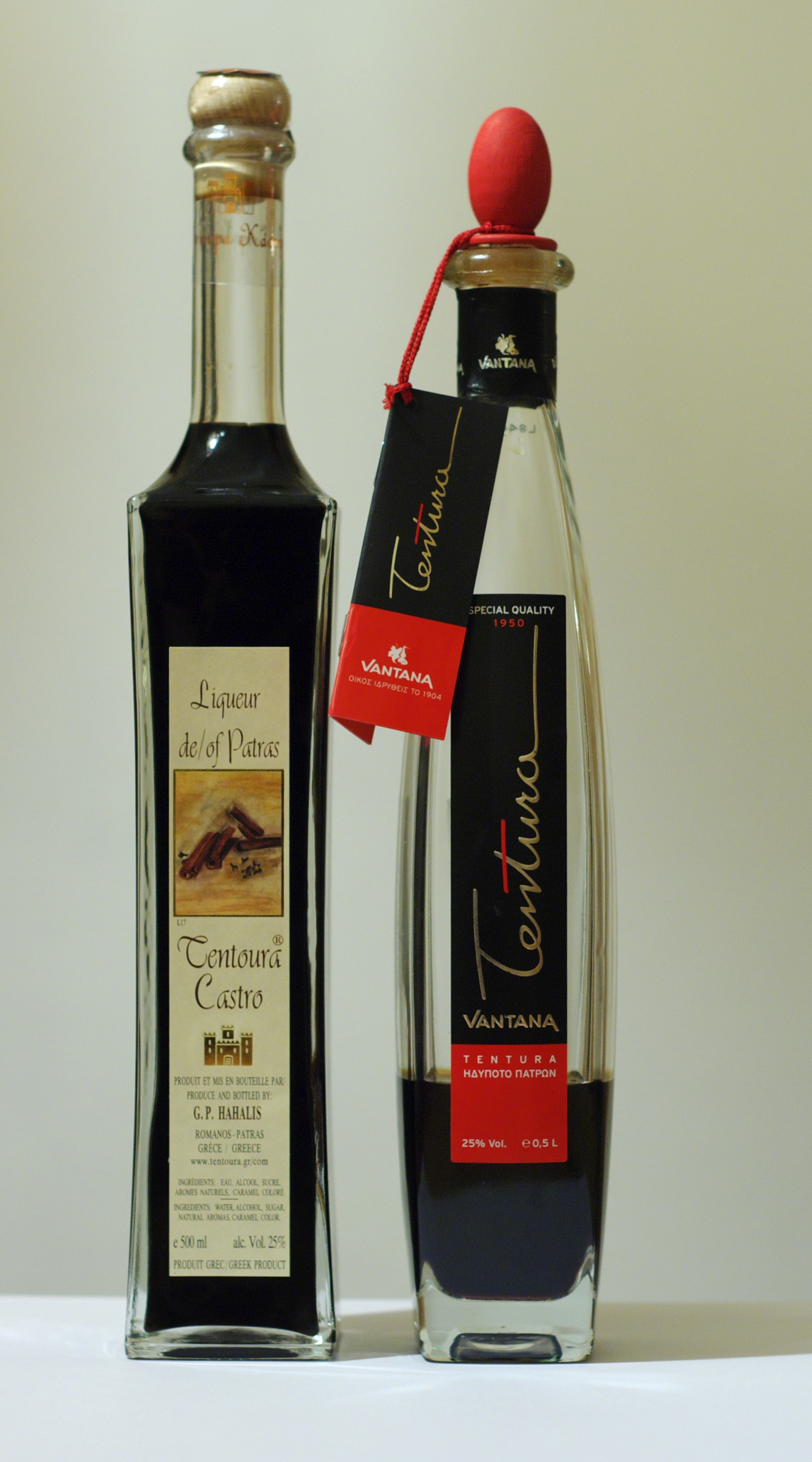
Tentura liqueur from Patras

Local specialities include:

- Bourjeto (similar to the Corfiot Bourdeto)
- Tilichtária Patrina, pork meat dish
- Galatopita
- Tiganites (type of pancakes)
- Patrina loukoumia
- Rodozachari
- Mavrodafni wine
- Tentura drink

== People ==
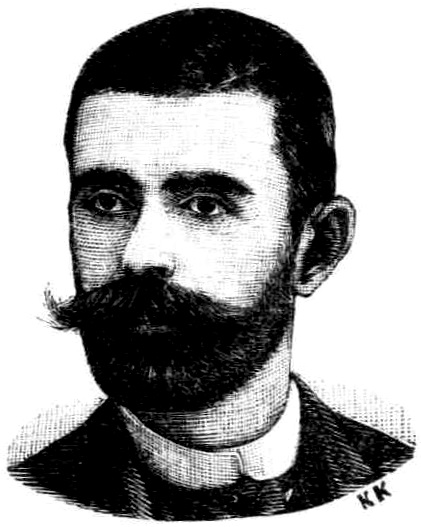
Kostis Palamas.

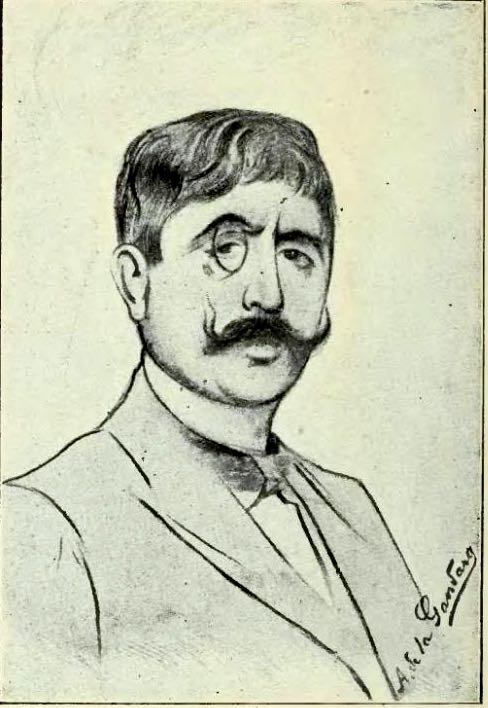
Jean Moréas.

The city has a significant political history in modern Greece; famous politicians from Patras include the prime ministers Dimitrios Gounaris, the main leader of the anti-venizelist party in the 1910s, Stylianos Gonatas, a high-ranking officer, politician and one of the leaders of the "1922 Revolution", Andreas Michalakopoulos, a prominent liberal party cadre, foreign minister and prime minister, and Dimitrios Maximos, a distinguished economist, minister and finally prime minister in the civil war era. More recent figures include the Papandreou family, arguably the most influential in post World War II Greece, Panagiotis Kanellopoulos, the last democratically elected head of government before the establishment of the 1967 junta, and Costis Stephanopoulos, the former president of the Hellenic Republic.

Politics

- Andreas Michalakopoulos, Prime Minister
- Apostolos Santas, Resistance member
- Athanasios Kanakaris
- Loukas Kanakaris-Roufos, MP of Patras
- Benizelos Roufos
- Costis Stephanopoulos, President of Greece
- Danielis, Byzantine noblewoman
- Dimitrios Gounaris, Prime Minister
- Dimitrios Maximos, Prime Minister
- Papandreou family (3 Prime Ministers)
- Panagiotis Kanellopoulos, Prime Minister
- Achilleas Gerokostopoulos, MP of Achaea
- Spyridonas Chrysanthakidis, Mayor

Sports

- Chilon of Patras, ancient Olympic winner
- Nikolaos Andriakopoulos, Olympic gold medalist
- Antonios Pepanos, Olympic silver medalist
- Stephanos Christopoulos, Olympic bronze medalist
- Dimitrios Tofalos, weightlifter
- Themistoklis Diakidis, athlete
- Kostas Davourlis, football player
- Ioannis Kastritis, former basketball player and coach in the Israel Basketball Premier League
- Kostas Katsouranis, football player
- Spyros Andriopoulos, marathon runner
- Periklis Iakovakis, athlete
- Kostas Petropoulos, basketball player
- Themis Rigas, football player
- Vassilis Stravopodis, football player
- Andreas Samaris, football player
- Nora Drakou, swimmer
- Kristel Vourna, swimmer
- Sofia Riga, marathon runner

Culture/Arts

- Pherekydes of Patrae, the first conductor in recorded history (709 BC)
- Nikos Apostolopoulos, fashion designer
- Rena Dor, actress/singer
- Spyros Fokas, actor
- Jean Goldkette, pianist
- Tasso Kavadia, actress
- Afroditi Laoutari, singer, actress
- Thanos Mikroutsikos (1947–2019) composer
- Memos Makris (1913–1993), sculptor
- Jean Moréas, poet
- Betty Moschona, actress
- Andreas Mikroutsikos, songwriter/TV presenter
- Tony Maroudas, singer
- Nitsa Marouda, actress
- George Kapotas (1933), sculptor
- Fotis Polymeris, composer/singer
- Poly Panou, singer
- Timos Perlegas, actor
- Kostis Palamas (1859–1943), poet
- Rodis Kanakaris-Roufos, writer
- Matilde Serao, novelist
- Gerasimos Skiadaresis, actor
- Mema Stathopoulou, actress
- Joseph Stephanini, author, former slave
- Epameinondas Thomopoulos (1878–1974), painter
- Sophia Vossou, singer
- Gerasimos Vokos, painter
- Vassilikos, songwriter/singer
- Spyridon Vasileiadis, playwright

Economy/Other

- Stylianos Gonatas, army officer
- Andrei Eberhardt, admiral in the Russian navy
- Mnaseas, historian
- Mineyko family
- Saint Regulus
- Arethas of Caesarea, archbishop
- Germanos III of Old Patras, bishop
- Theodoros Tzinis, soldier and businessman
- Panagiotis Karatzas, revolutionary
- Gustav Clauss, founder of Achaia Clauss
- Papadiamantopoulos family
- Kostas Makris, Greek Australian Businessman during his time as owner of Panachaiki Fc.
- Angela Politopoulos (1934), historian
- Christoforos Stratos, businessman
- Georgios Streit, lawyer
- Stefanos Streit, jurist
- Spyros Monteleev, Greeks in Russia and Ukraine Chemist

== Transport ==
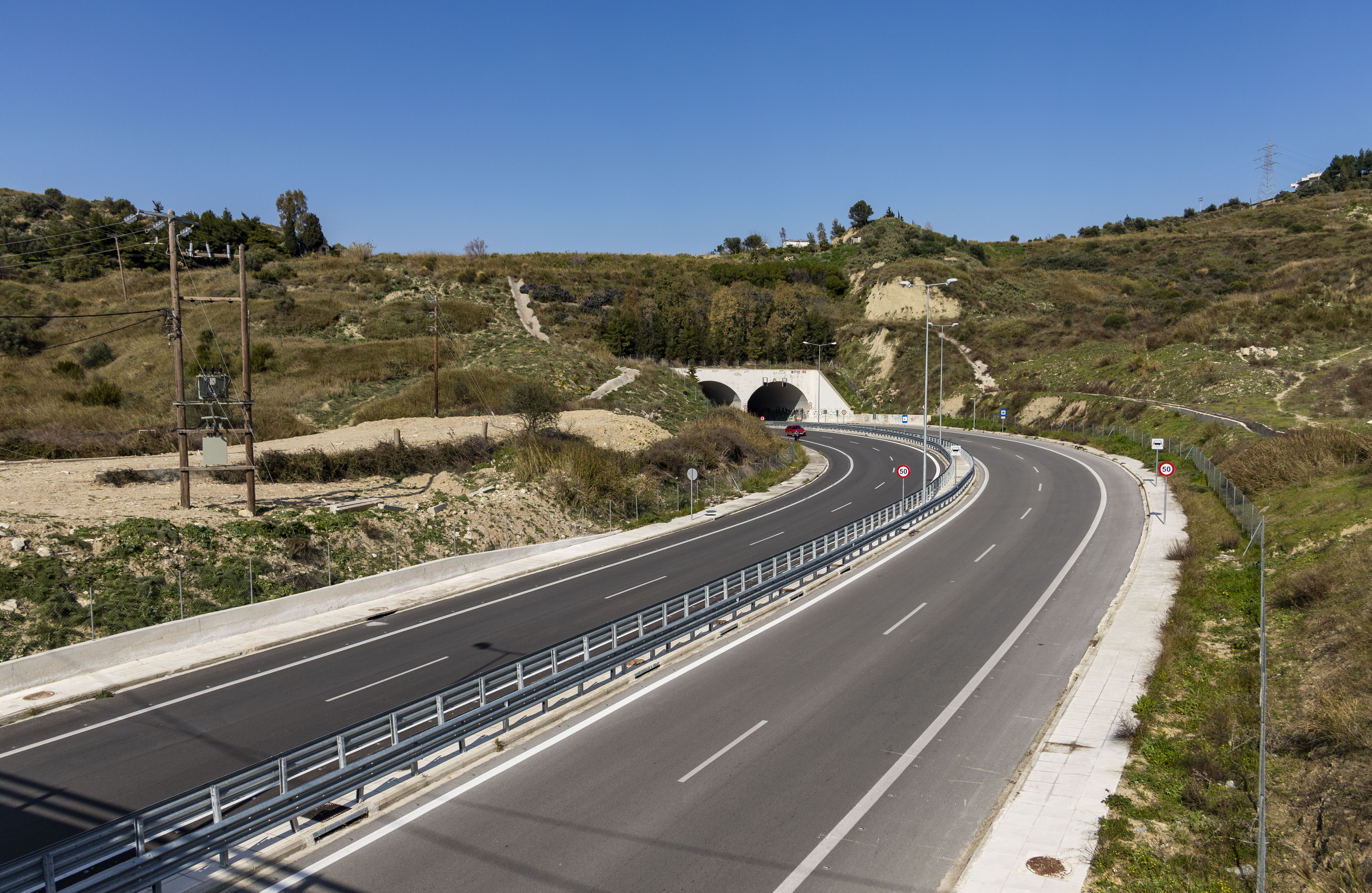
Patras ring road

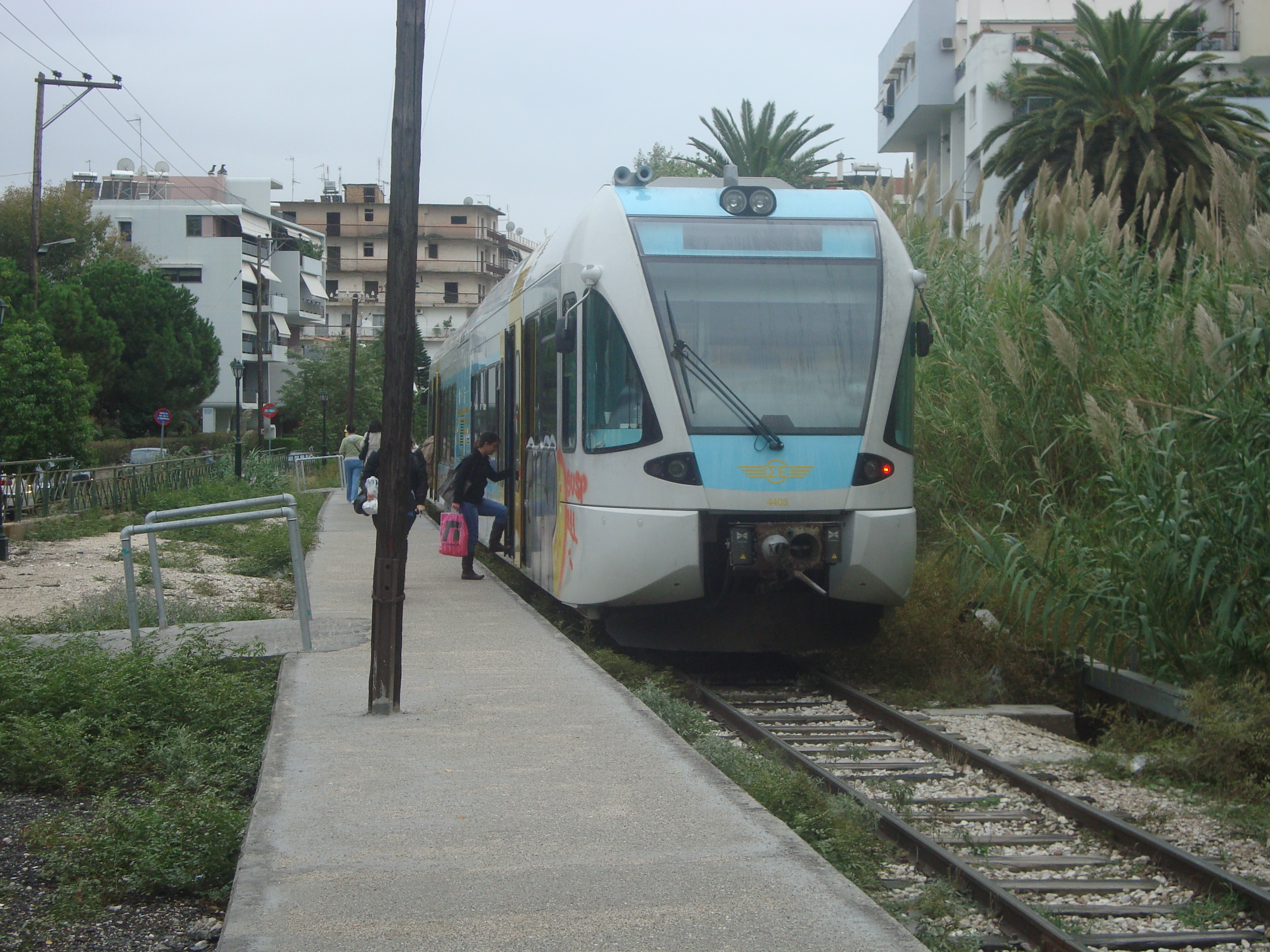
Suburban rail (Proastiakos) in Patras

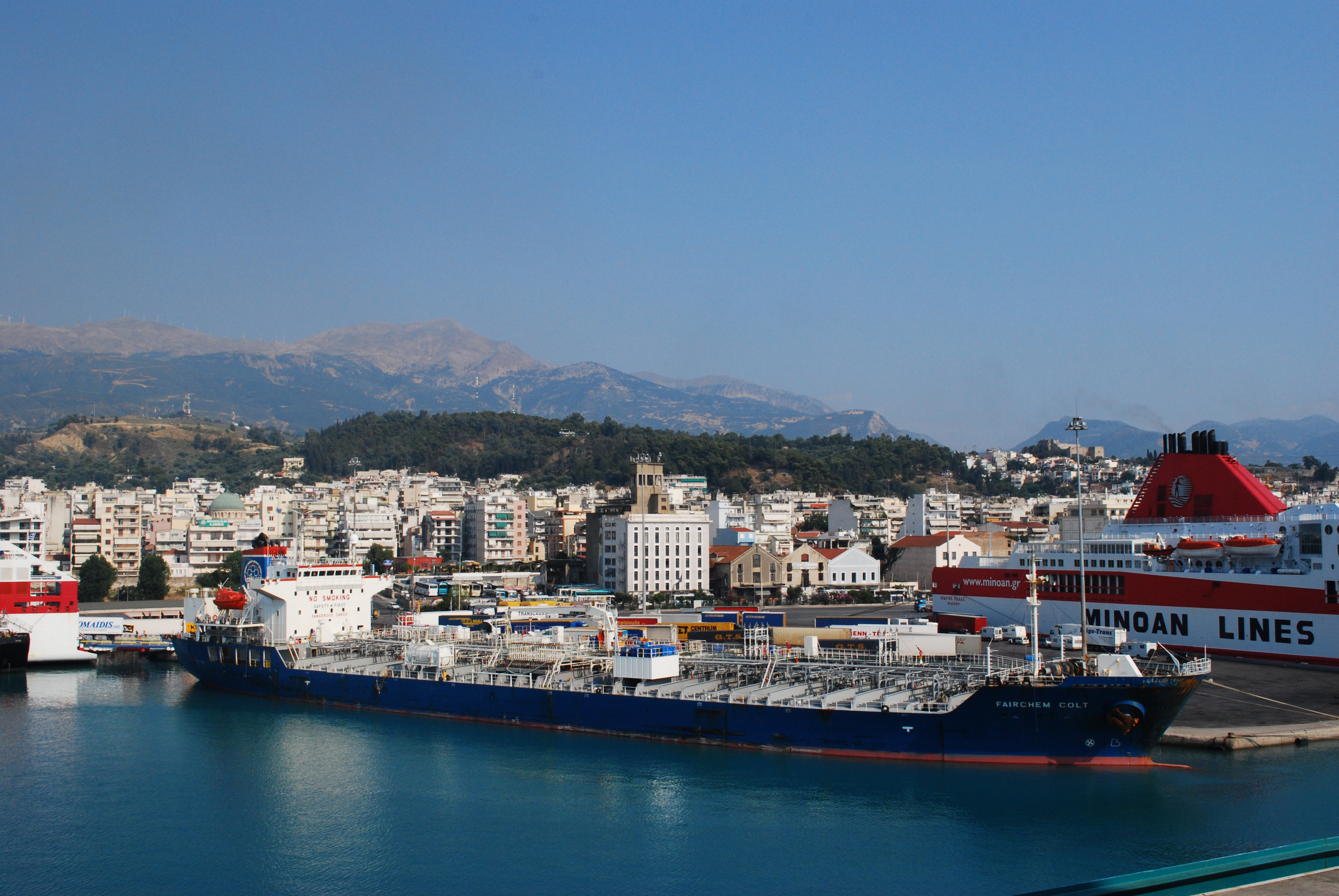
View of the port.

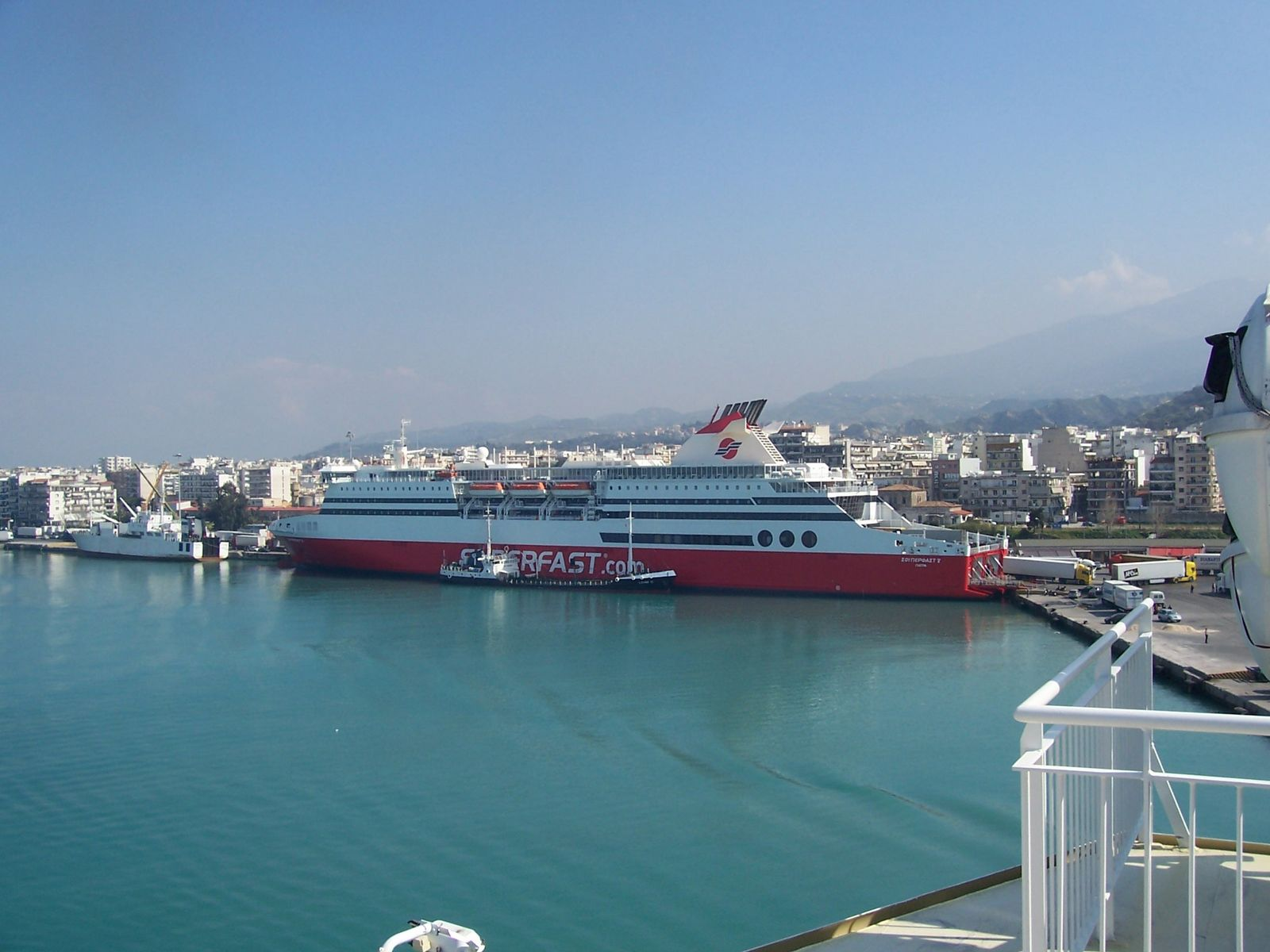
Superfast V of Superfast Ferries at the port.

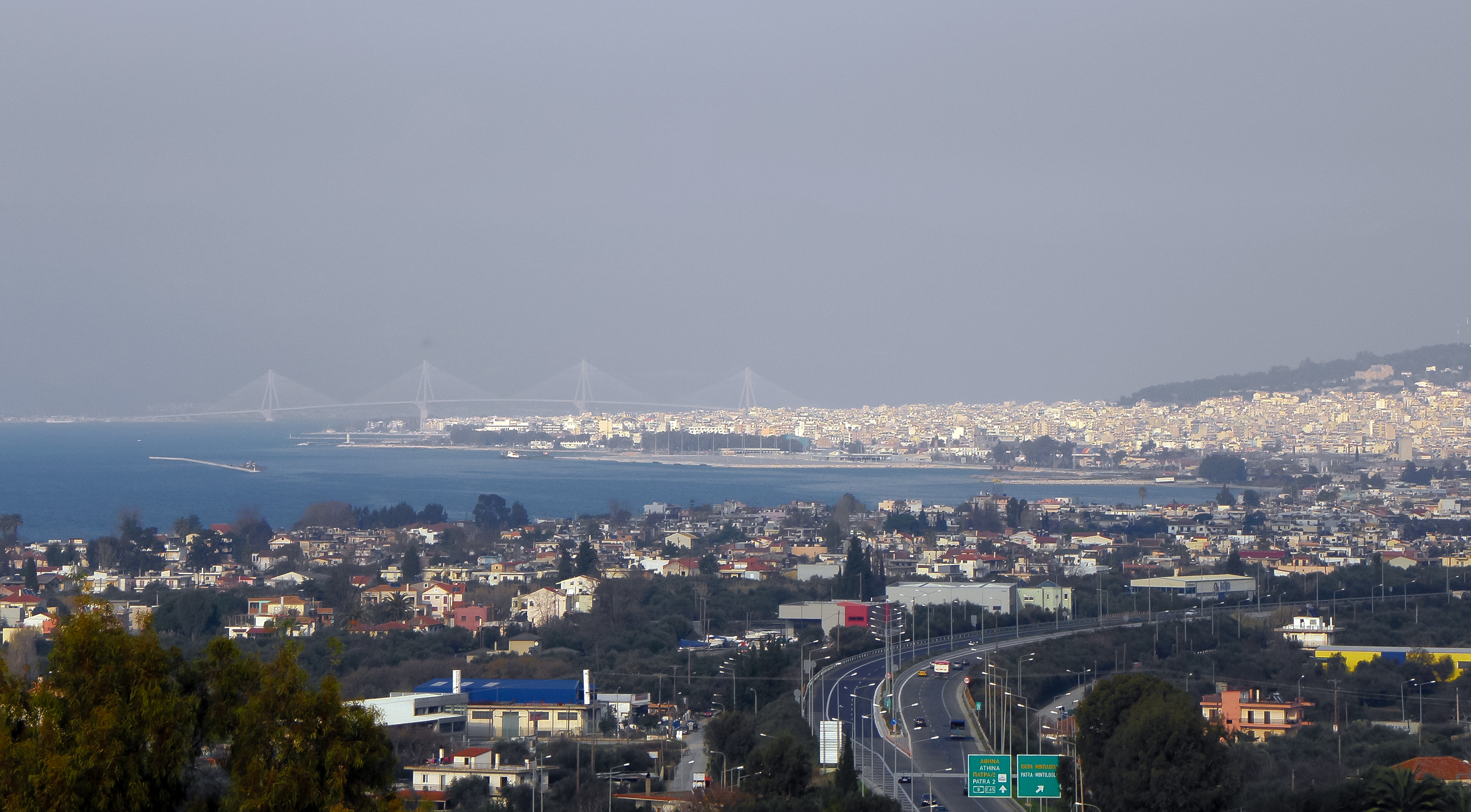
Patra, Peloponnese. City's SW entrance. Start/end of city's bypass.

=== Seaport ===
The city has always been a sea-trade hub because of its strategic position. The port manages more than half of the foreign sea-passenger transportation in Greece, and has excellent car-ferry links with the Ionian Islands and the major Adriatic ports of Italy. Additionally, a new port was built in the southern section of the city to accommodate the increased traffic and relieve the city centre from port operations. In 2011, this port went into operation. Ferries to Italy now dock there.

The port is connected by a number of daily routes to the Ionian islands Kerkyra, Kefallonia, to the port of Igoumenitsa and to the Italian cities Ancona, Bari, Brindisi, Trieste and Venice.

=== Roads ===
A newly constructed, 20-kilometre (12 mi) ring road (the Bypass of Patras) was first opened in 2002 in order to alleviate heavy traffic throughout the city. A mini ring road (known as the "Mini bypass" of Patras) is now complete (2019), alleviating heavy traffic-related problems in the city centre. The mini-bypass is a two lanes mototway bridging the northern city entrance at the Zavlani neighborhood to the eastern entrance at the Aroi, Synora and Upper town (Ano poli) neighborhoods reducing the city centre crossing time to less than 4 minutes drive.

Two large highways were also constructed, connecting the seacoast and the new port with the Bypass of Patras. The first is over the small Diakoniaris river (from Eleftheriou Venizelou street until the Bypass'es exit in Eglykada), while the second consists of two roads, 4 km (2 mi) each, that run in parallel with the Glafkos river entering at the city' s New Port. Another project was completed recently, leading to an additional entrance to the downtown area after expanding and widening Kanakari street. This work led to a fast, direct connection of the city's mini bypass road with the city centre.

The highway connection with Athens was recently upgraded to a 220 km closed motorway (Olympia Odos), with a speed limit of 130 km/hour, reducing the transit time to 1 hour and 45 minutes. The motorway was connected to the Large bypass highway and was extended all the way to Pyrgos in July 2025. Patras will eventually be a central hub of the A5 and A8 motorways, intended to bridge western Greece from Kalamata to Ioannina and the Kakavia border station. The Rio-Antirio Bridge is north of the city and links the Peloponnese to mainland Greece. It was completed in August 2004.

Additional work was recently announced to begin in 2023 in order to connect via highway the Rion Antirrion bridge with Nafpaktos, Itea, Amfissa and Lamia. This project is expected to reduce the trip to Lamia to 90 minutes and its completion is expexted in 2025.

Patras is bypassed by the Olympia Odos (A8) motorway, which is also part of the E55 route that crosses the Rio-Antirio Bridge, dominating the sealine across the Gulf of Corinth.

- EO5/E55
- EO8/E55 and E65 (partly Panepistimiou Street)
- EO8a
- EO9/E55 (partly Akti Dymaion)
- EO33 (partly Kalavryton, Georgiou Papandreou Street and Akrotiriou)
- Bypass of Patras

=== Rail ===
A rudimentary single, narrow-gauge railway track crosses the city and connects it to Rio. In the past regional rail links were provided by the Hellenic Railways Organisation, connecting Patras to Athens and Piraeus as well as to Pyrgos and Kalamata. OSE announced the suspension of all the rail service in the Peloponnese in January 2011 so today the railway track is in use only by suburban trains that connect Patras with the adjacent villages of Rio and Agios Vasileios.

The central passenger train station of Patras which is a small building constructed in 1954, lies to the west of the downtown area, between Othonos-Amalias Avenue and the north port. The main freight station of Aghios Andreas lies further to the south, next to the homonymous church and it is not in use any more. Finally, the old depot of Aghios Dionysios, consisting of about ten tracks, offers basic turntable and roundhouse facilities; it is about 400 m (1,312.34 ft) long.

A new double standard gauge railway line, the Athens Airport–Patras railway, is under construction and will link Patras to Korinth and further to Athens. The construction works are currently in progress close to the suburbs of Patras, but the remaining few kilometres till the city centre and the new port are still under study because of various financial and technical problems. As of 2020, the new railway reaches Aigio, 40 kilometres (25 mi) east of Patras.

=== Public transport ===
Patras is served by buses. There are two transport lines to and from the University of Patras and some nearby lines to city suburbs such as Saravali, Glafkos, and Paralia. All the urban bus lines are about 40, with three numbers.

Commuter rail services have recently been established by Proastiakos, with one line currently connecting Patras, Rio, and Agios Vasileios.

Regional bus links are provided by the KTEL bus company and connect the city to most of Greece.

=== Air ===
Seasonal civilian air transport is provided by the military Patras Araxos Airport, about 40 km (25 mi) from the city's centre.

== International relations ==
Patras is a pilot city of the Council of Europe and the European Commission Intercultural cities programme.

=== Twin towns – sister cities ===
Patras is twinned with:

- Aleksinac, Serbia
- (Bosnia and Herzegovina) Banja Luka, Bosnia-Herzegovina
- Ancona, Italy
- Bari, Italy
- Byblos, Lebanon
- Bydgoszcz, Poland
- Canterbury, Australia
- Chișinău, Moldova
- Craiova, Romania
- Debrecen, Hungary
- Famagusta, Cyprus
- Focşani, Romania
- Gjirokastër, Albania
- Kharkiv, Ukraine
- Limassol, Cyprus
- Ohrid, North Macedonia
- Reggio Calabria, Italy
- Saint-Étienne, France
- (United States) Savannah, US
- Split, Croatia
- Vilnius, Lithuania
- Wuxi, People's Republic of China
- Kaliningrad, Russia

Patras was selected as main motif for the €10 Greek Patras 2006 commemorative coin, minted in 2006. This coin was designed to commemorate an event signaling an enlightened course for Patras and serving as a reminder of the way in which culture can stimulate the economy and promote development, when Patras was appointed European Capital of Culture. On the obverse is the logo for Patras 2006 around the words "European Capital of Culture".

=== Consulates ===
The city hosts consulates from the following countries:

- Austria
- Belgium
- Denmark
- Estonia
- France
- Finland
- Germany
- Hungary
- Italy
- Norway
- Philippines
- Romania
- Russia
- Spain
- Switzerland
- Sweden
- Ukraine
- United Kingdom

== Gallery ==
The flag raised by Andreas Londos in Patras at the outbreak of the Greek War of Independence.

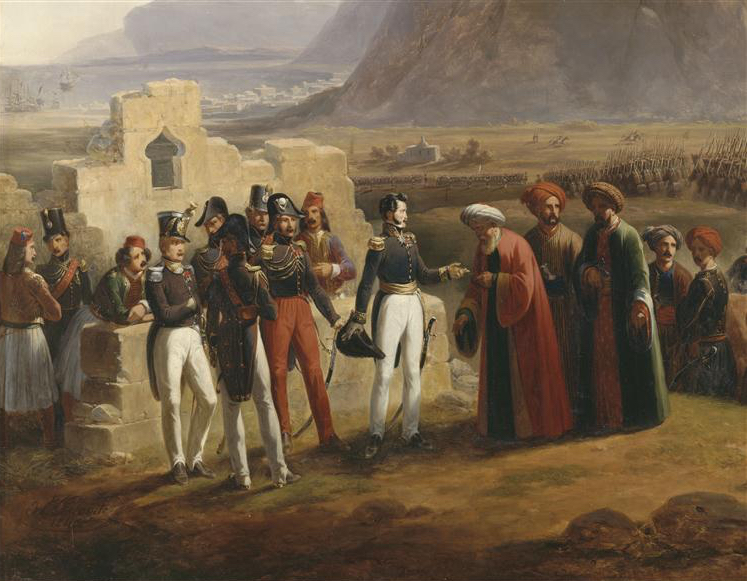
Surrender of Patras to General Schneider by Hippolyte Lecomte.

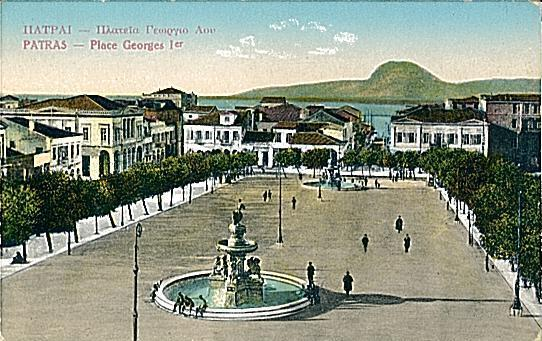
Postcard with King George I Square in the late 19th century.

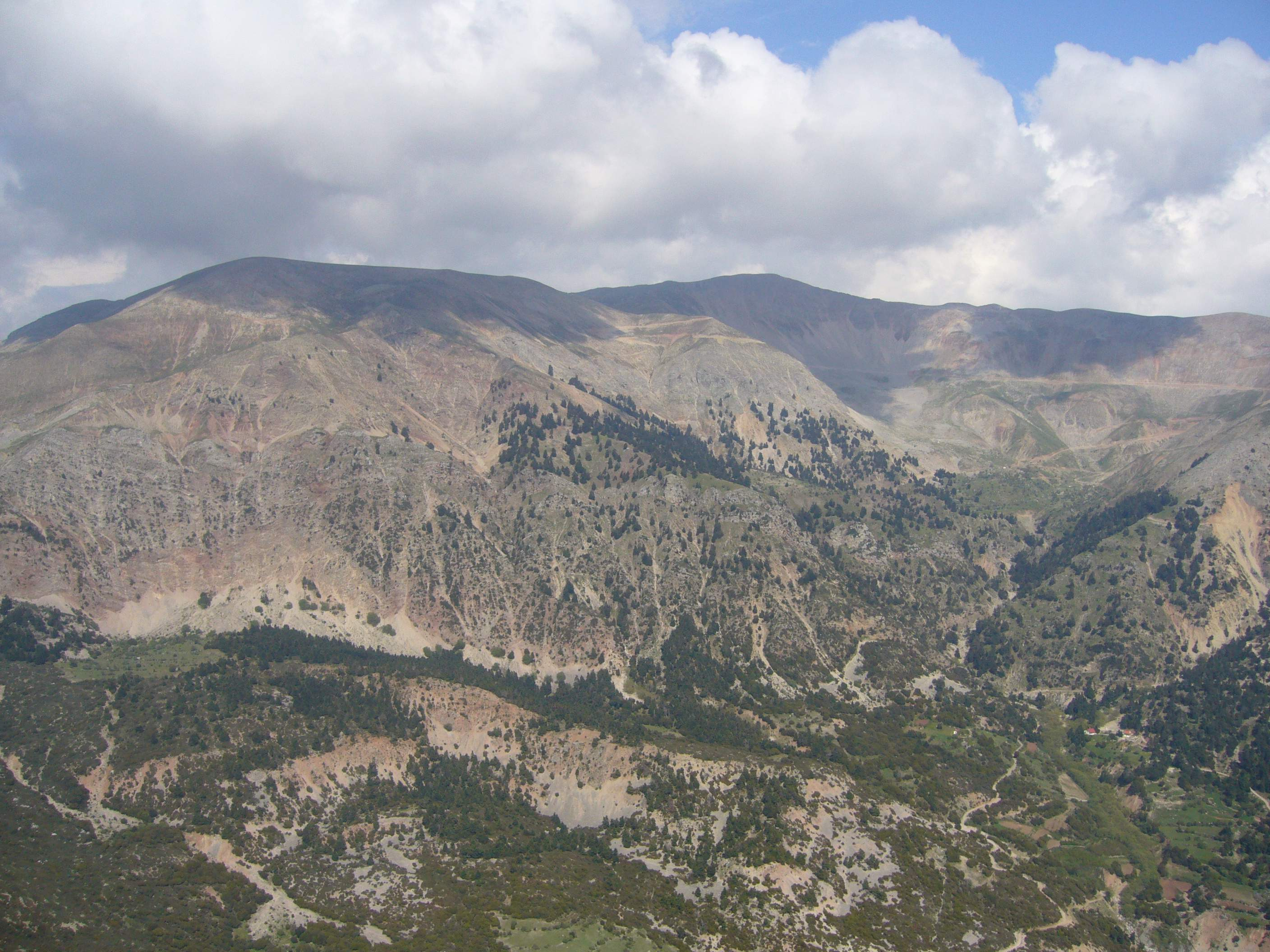
A view of Panachaiko mountain.

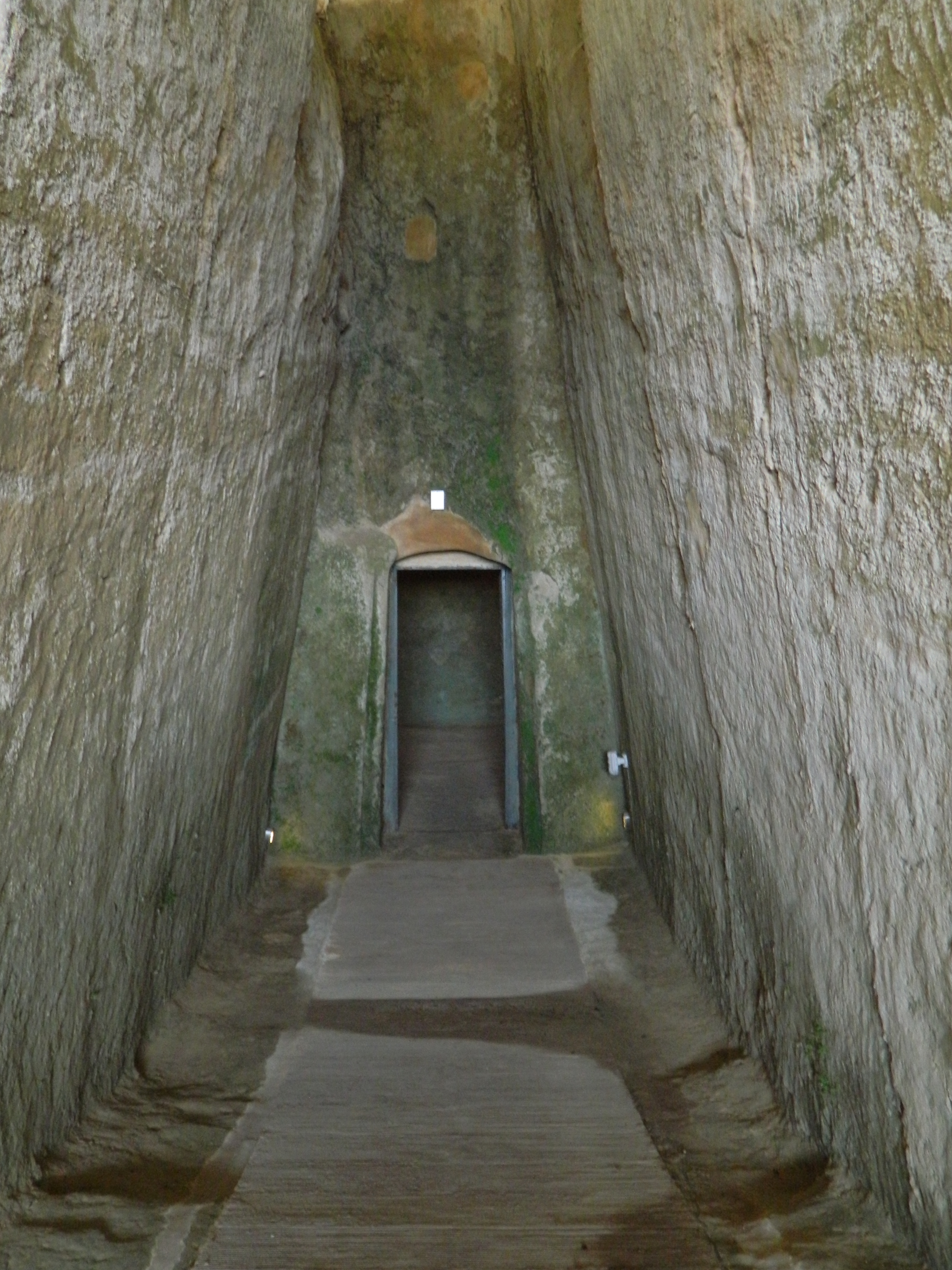
Inside the Mycenaean cemetery of Voudeni, outside the city

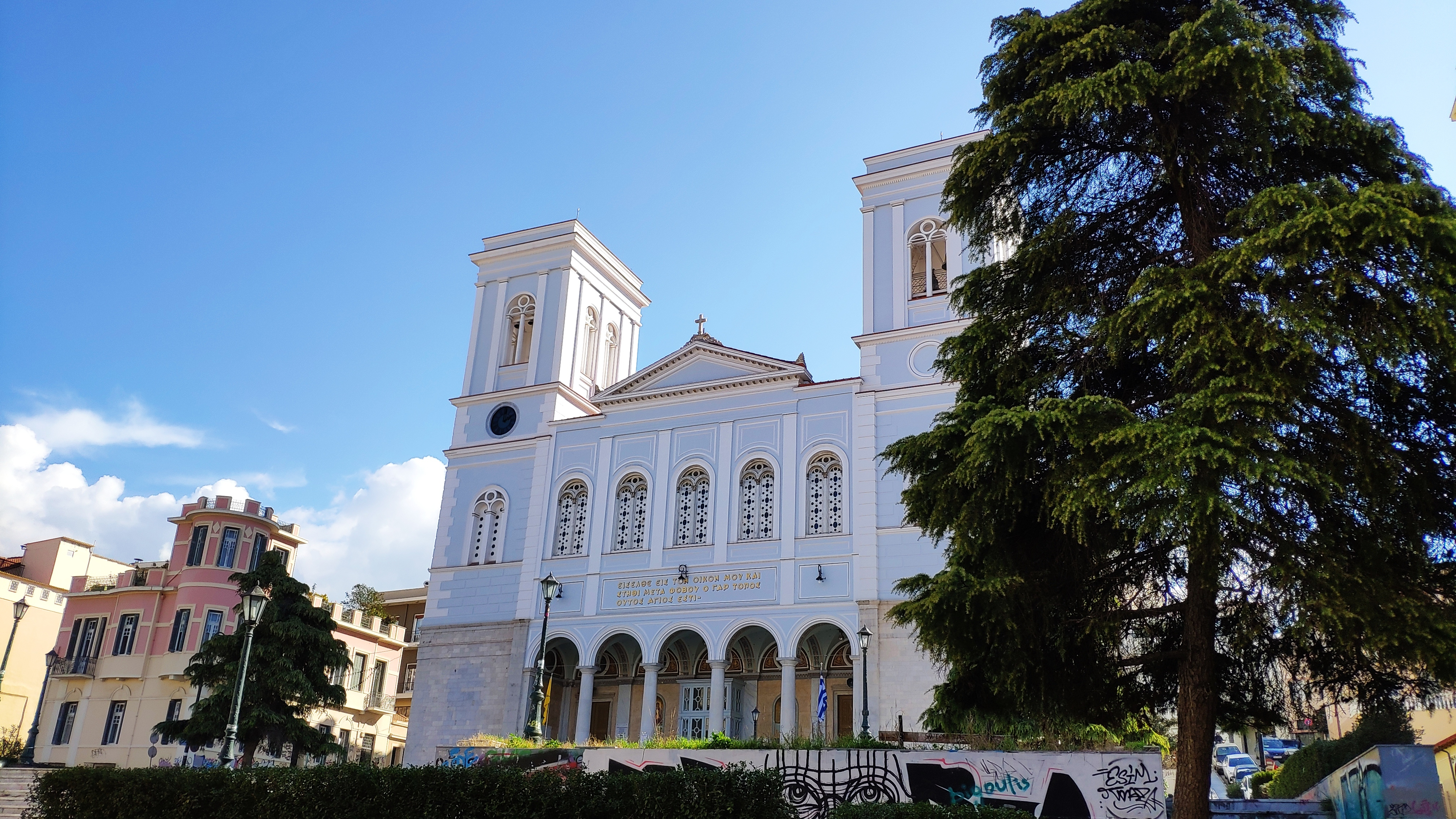
Pantanassa church

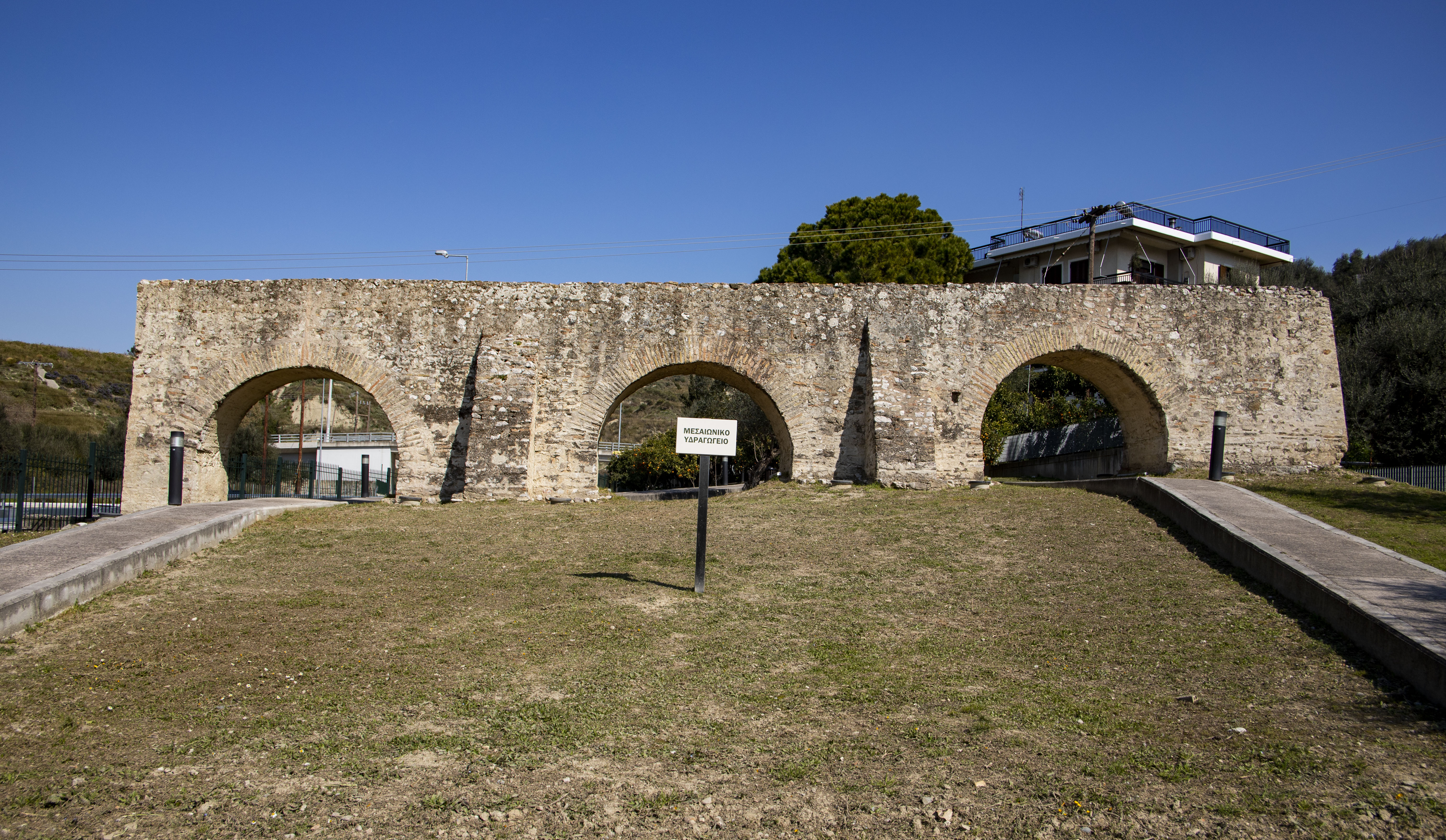
Ruins of the Roman and Medieval Aqueducts

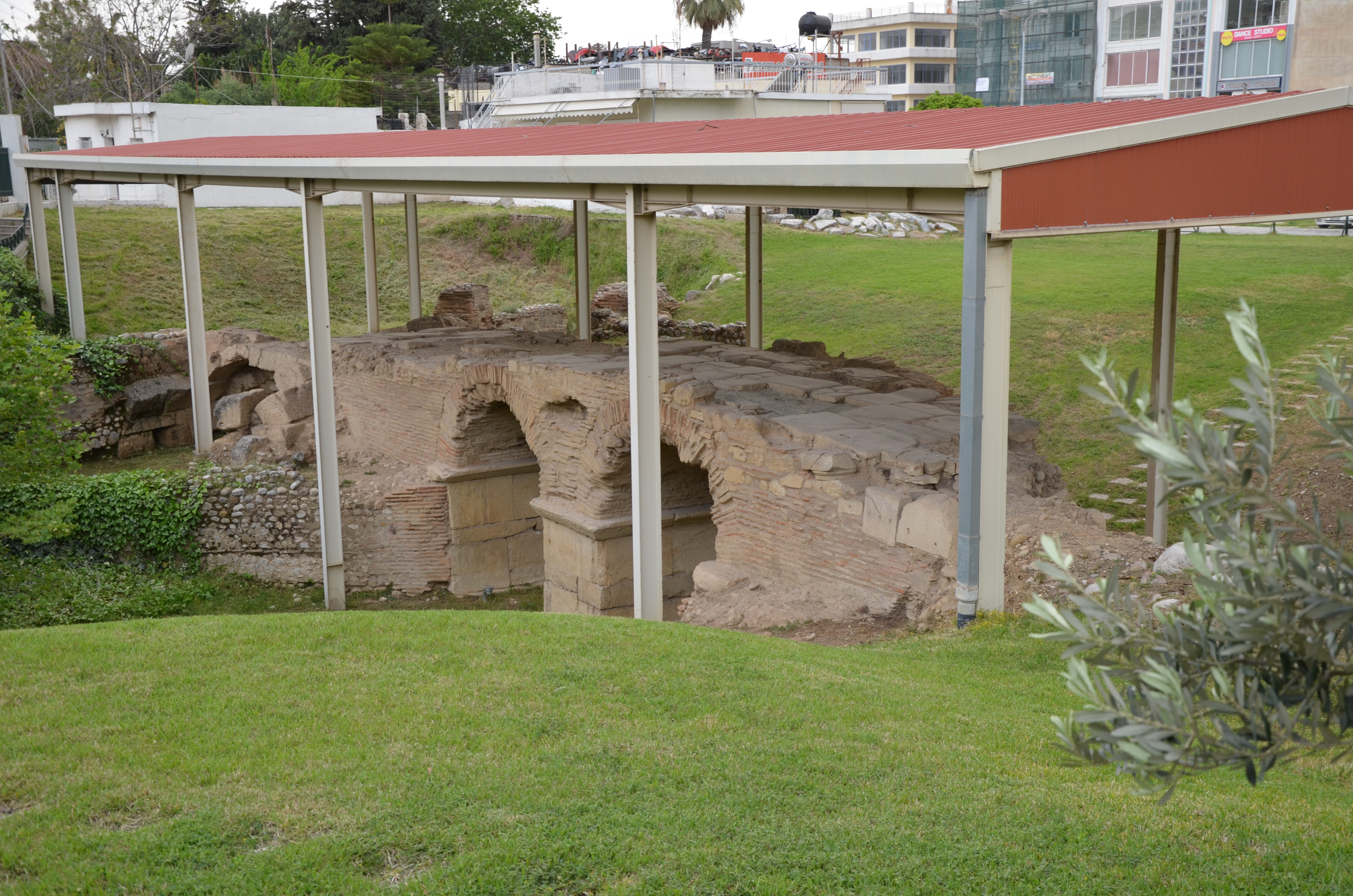
Part of the Roman bridge over river Kallinaos

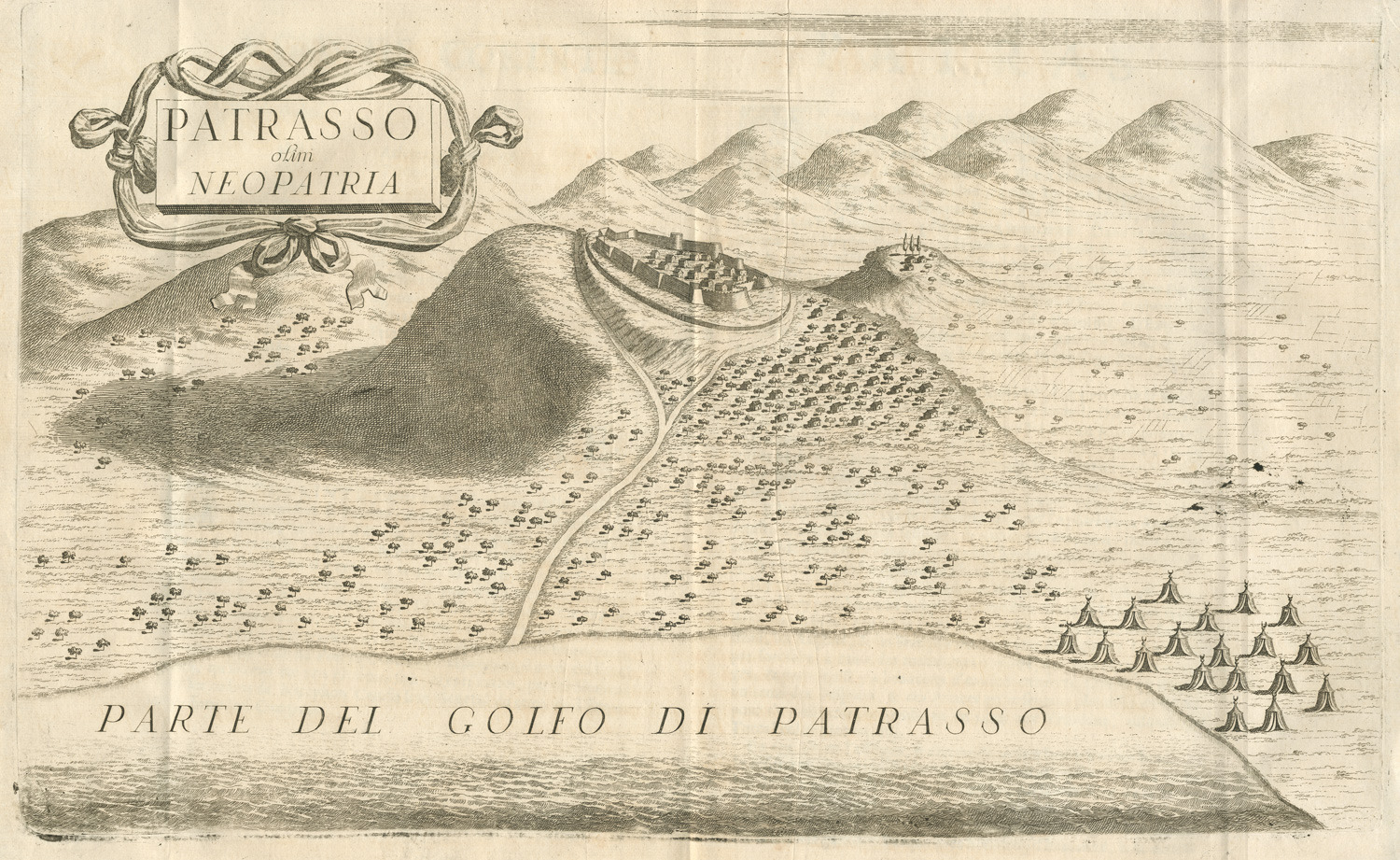
Illustration of Patrasso, 1687

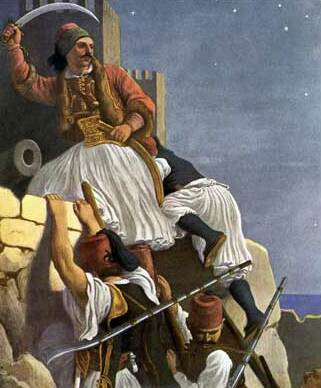
Athanasios Kanakaris during the Siege of Patras by Peter von Hess (1821)

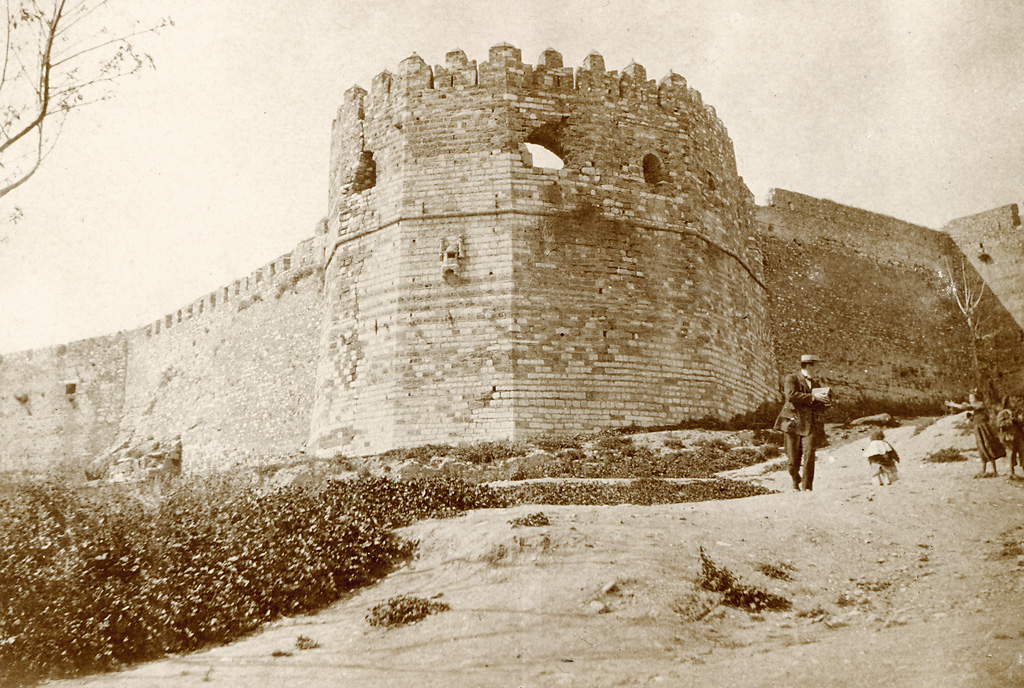
Patras Castle, 1890

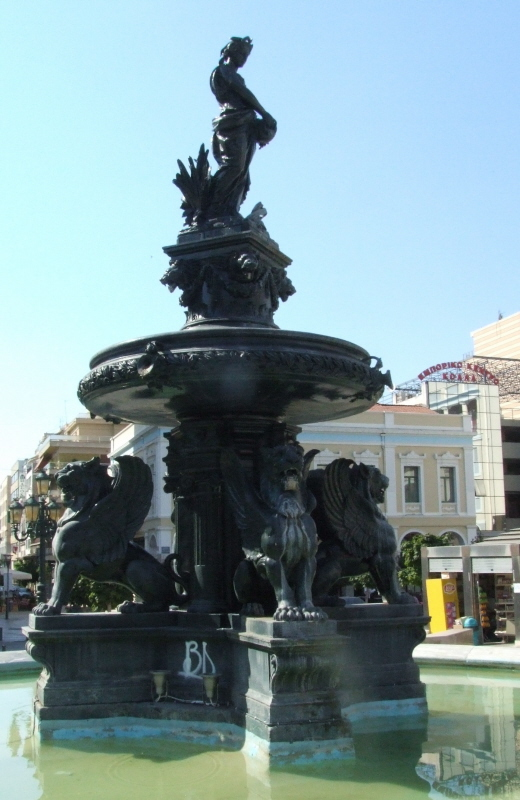
Fountain in Georgiou I Square

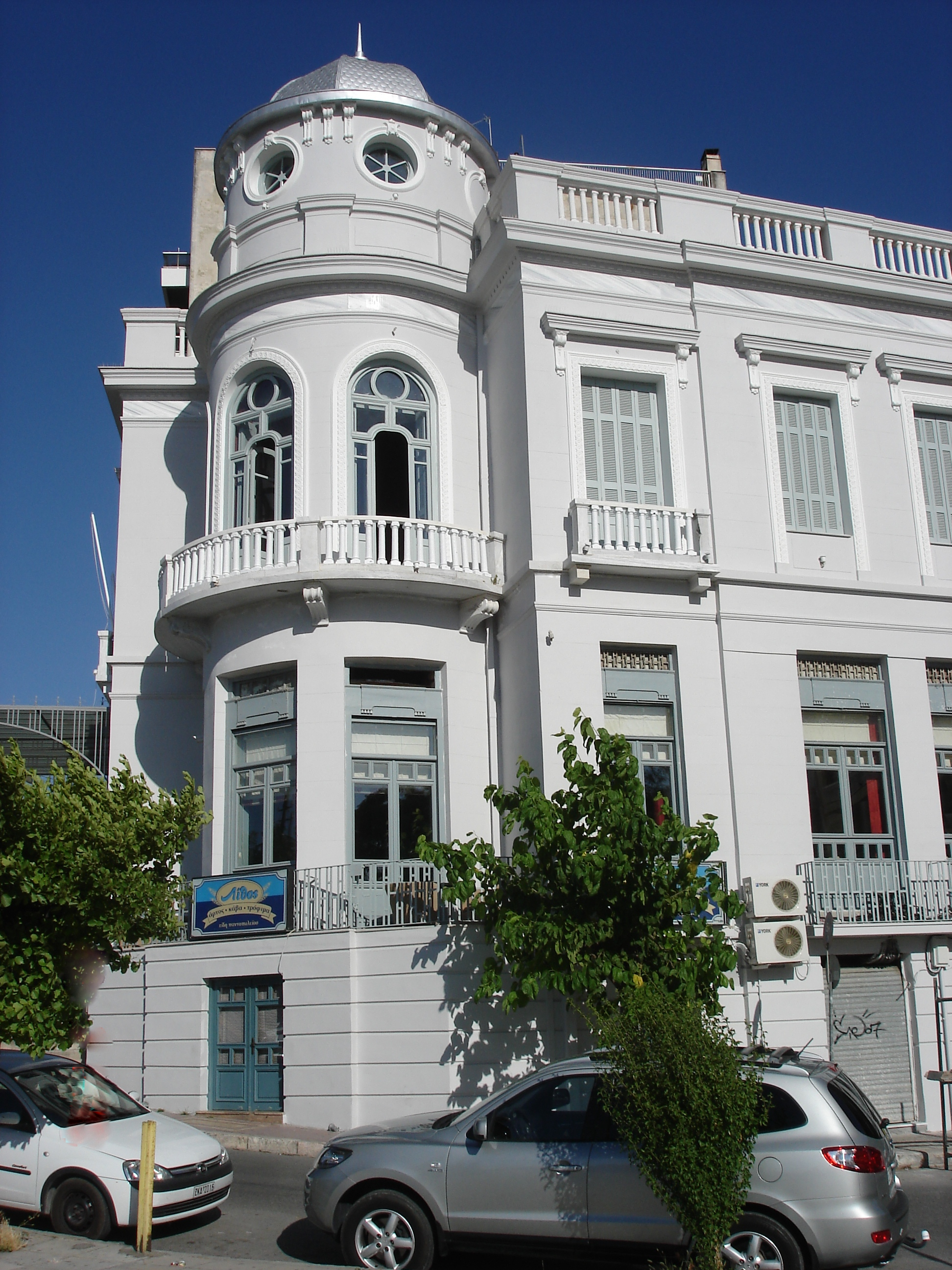
Alhambra mansion, Trion Navarchon Street

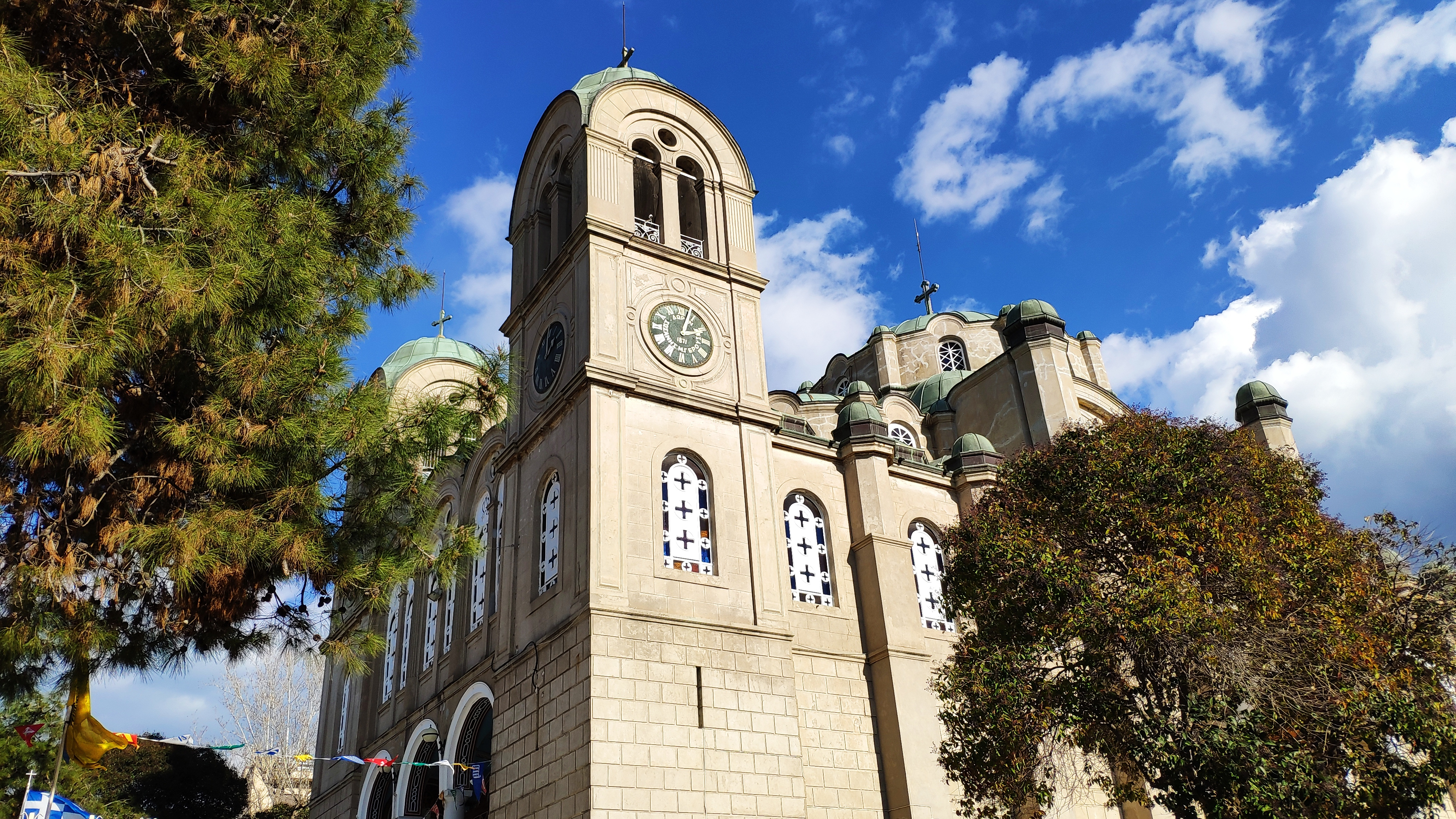
Pantokrator church, uptown district

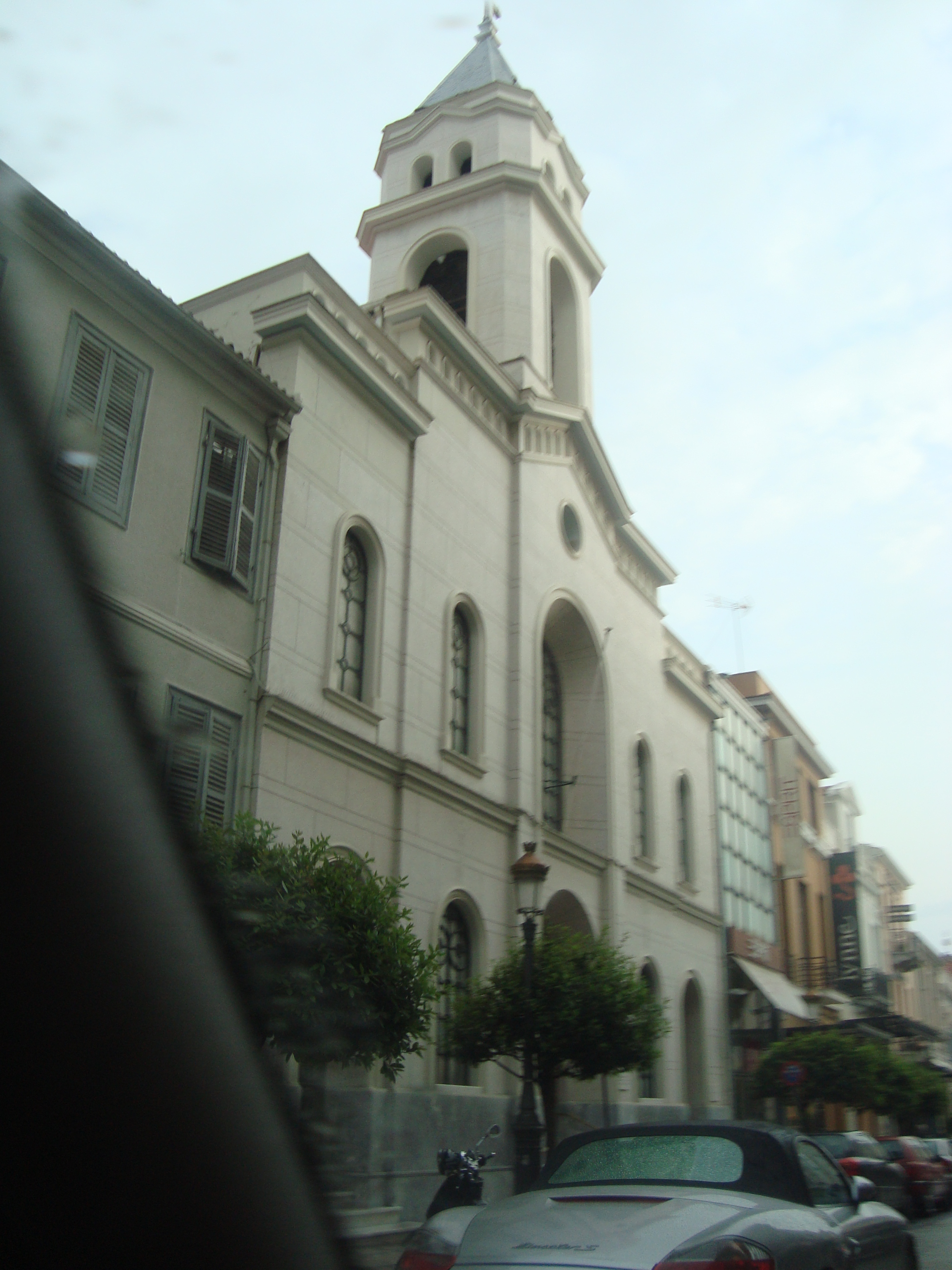
Catholic Church of Saint Andrew

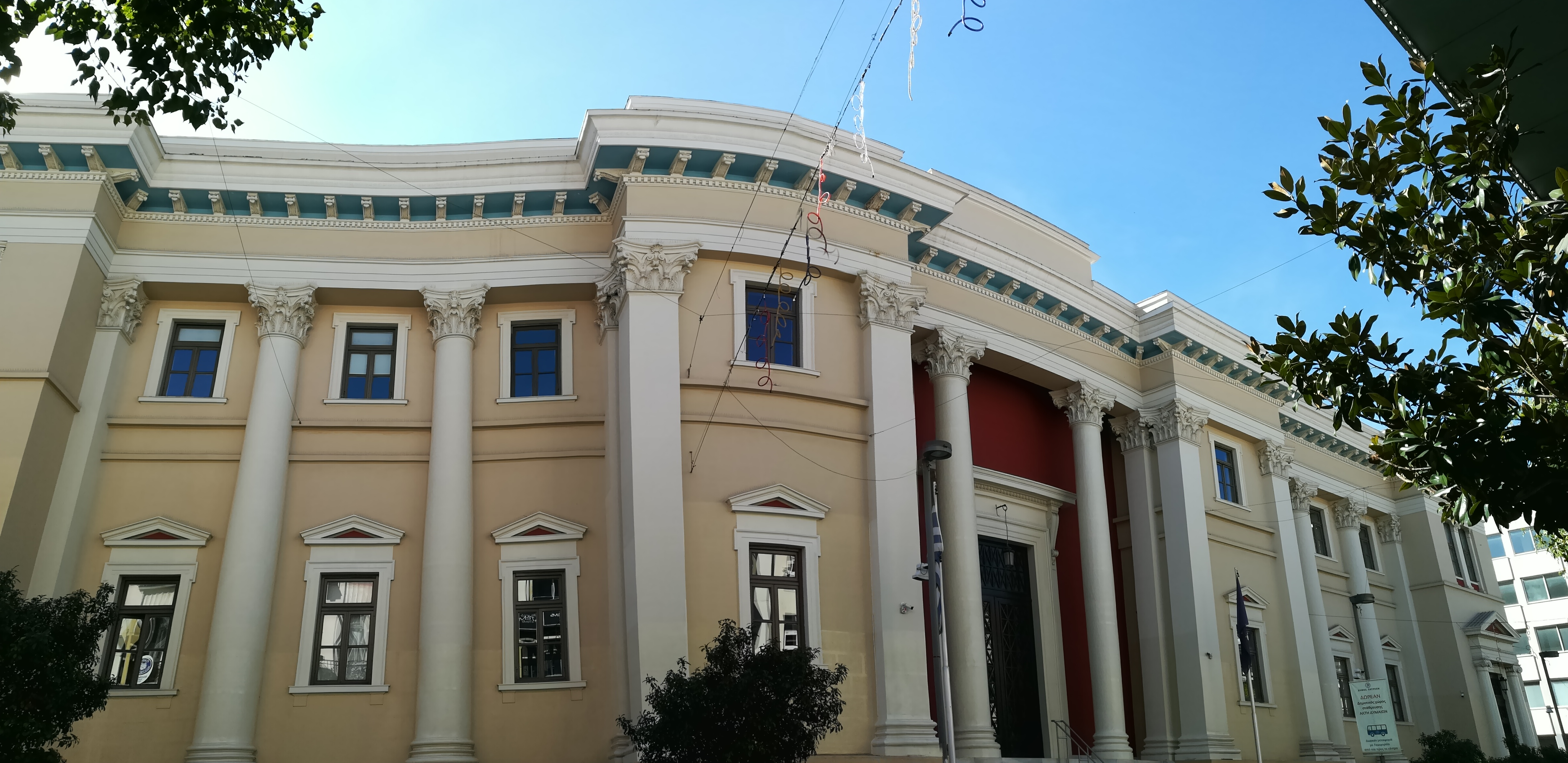
The courthouse

The house where Kostis Palamas and Matilde Serao were born.

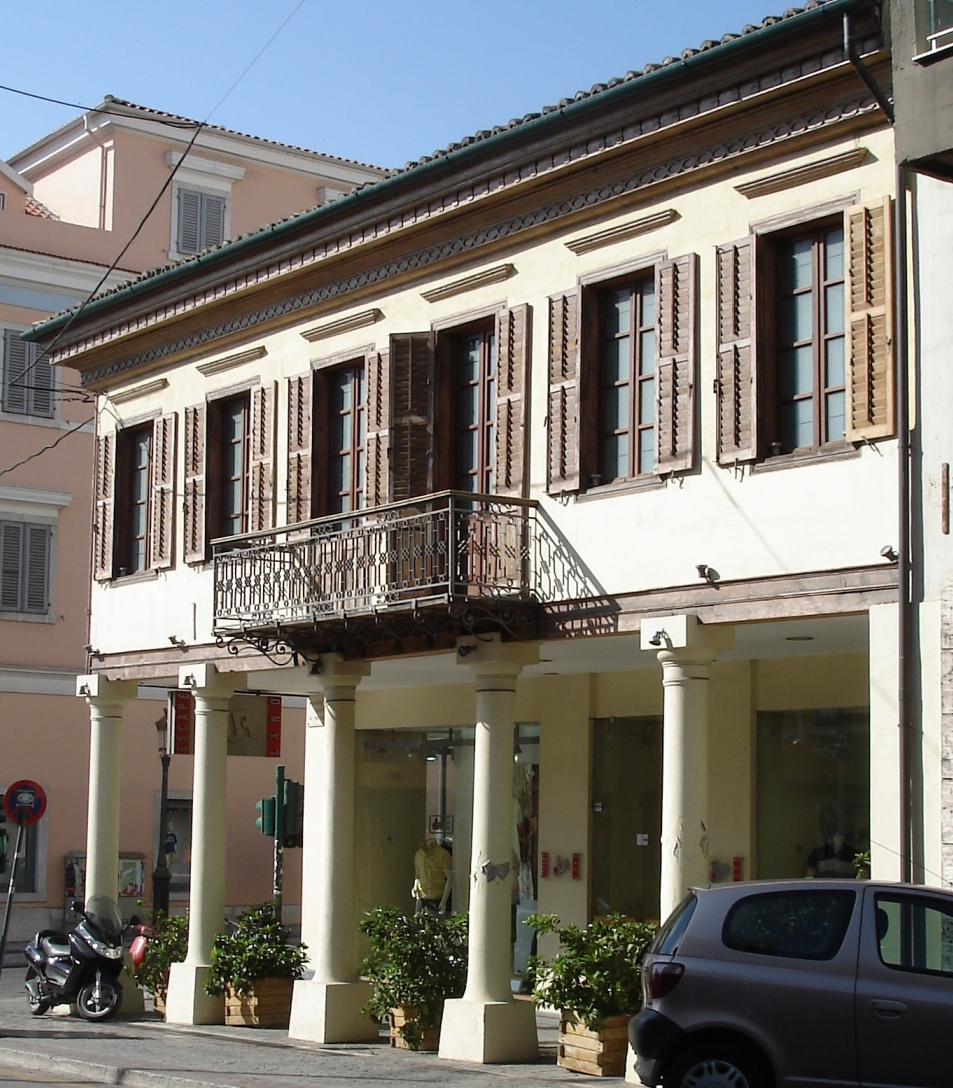
Tzini's house (1832), Maisonos & Agiou Nikolaou street

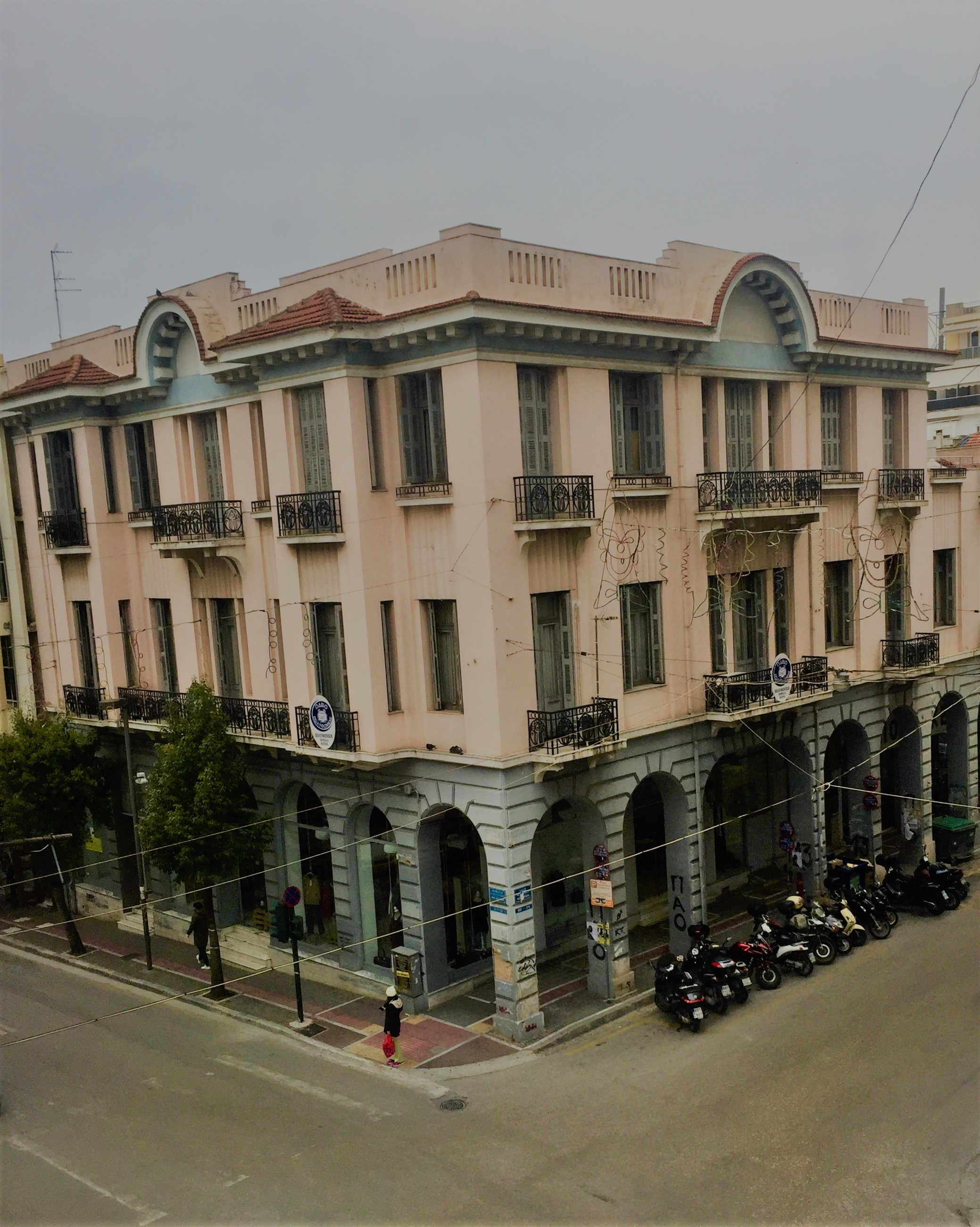
Prapopoulos building

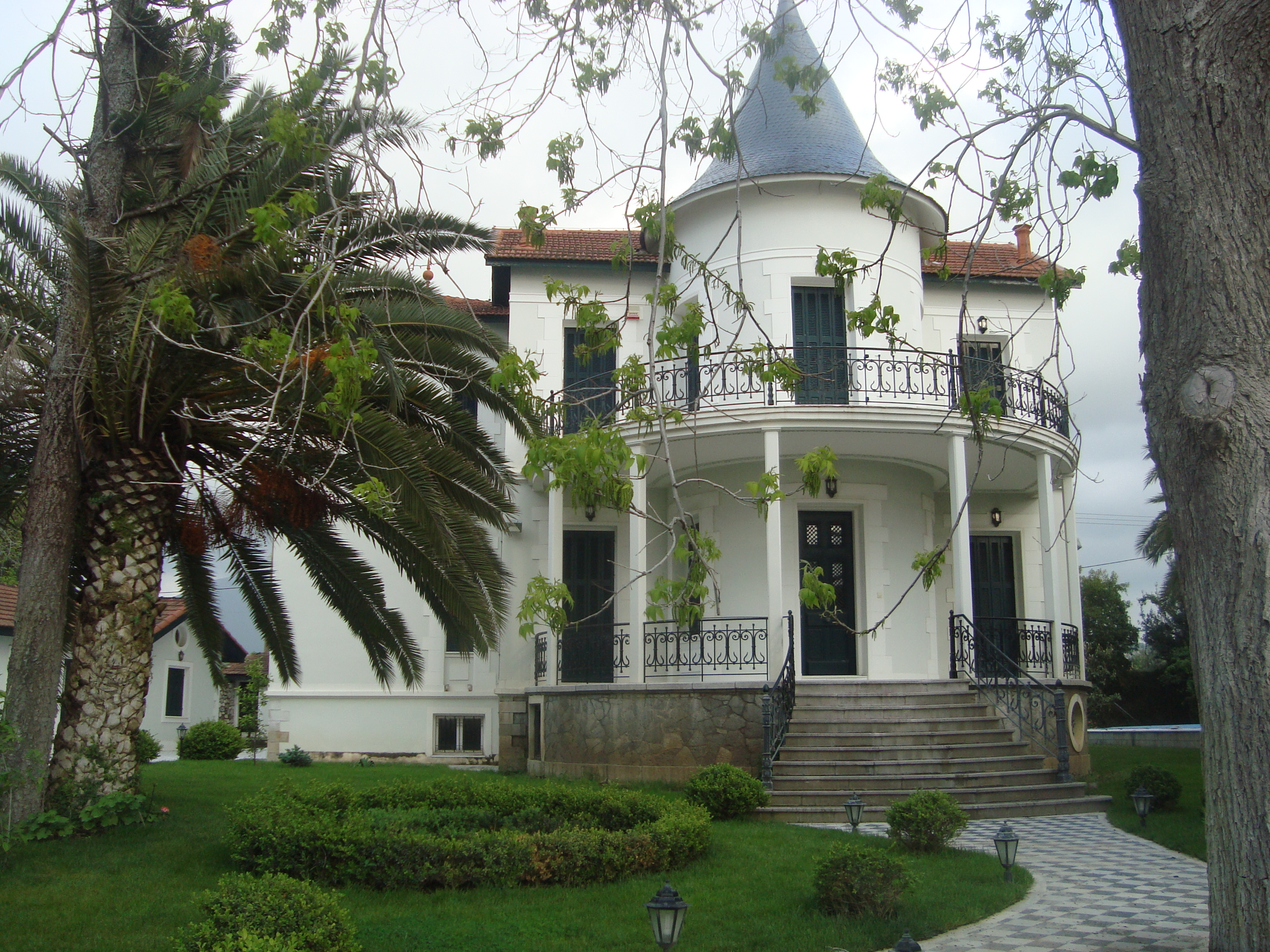
Villa Crove at the old English (Egglezika) district of Patras

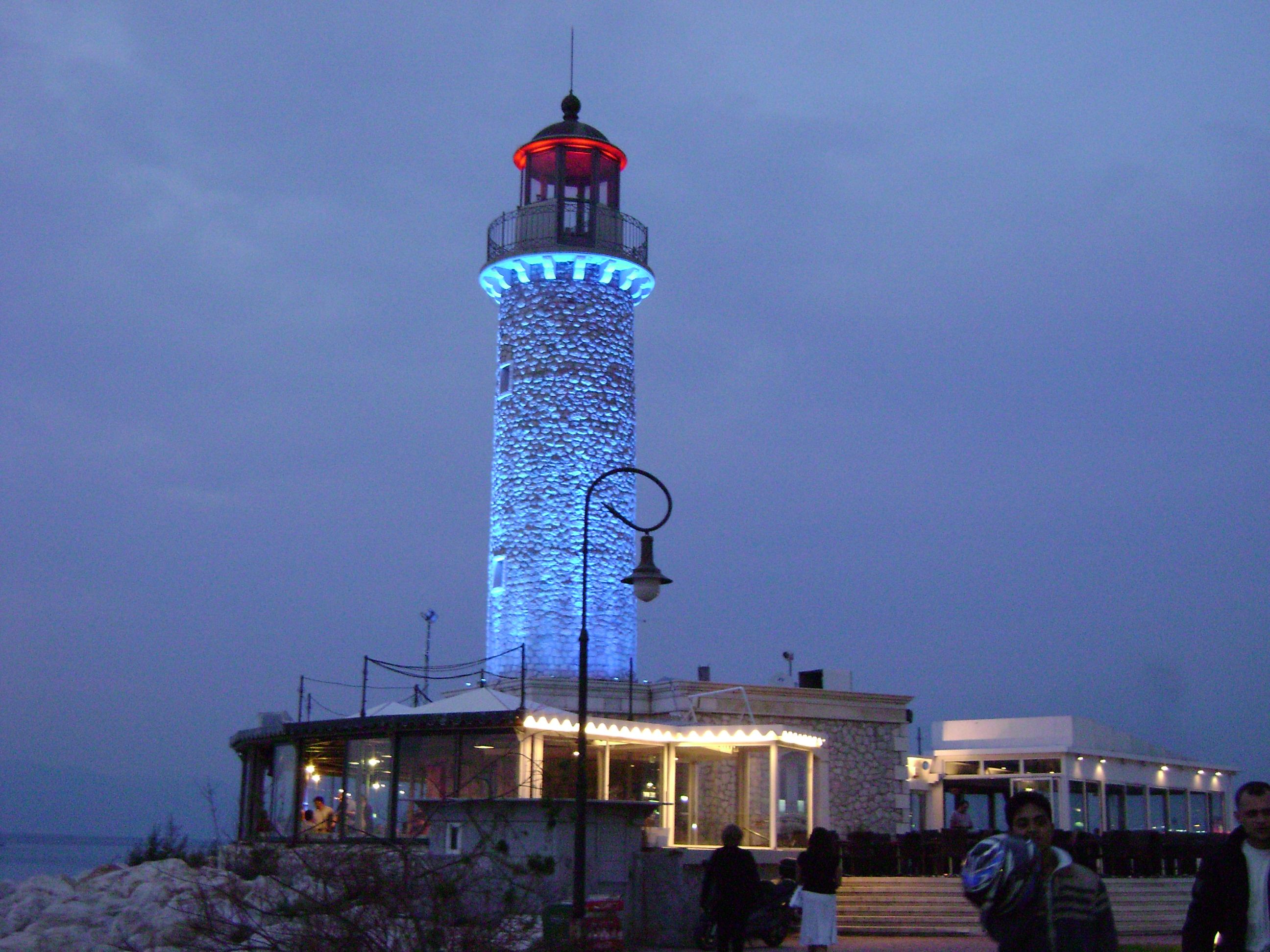
Patras Lighthouse

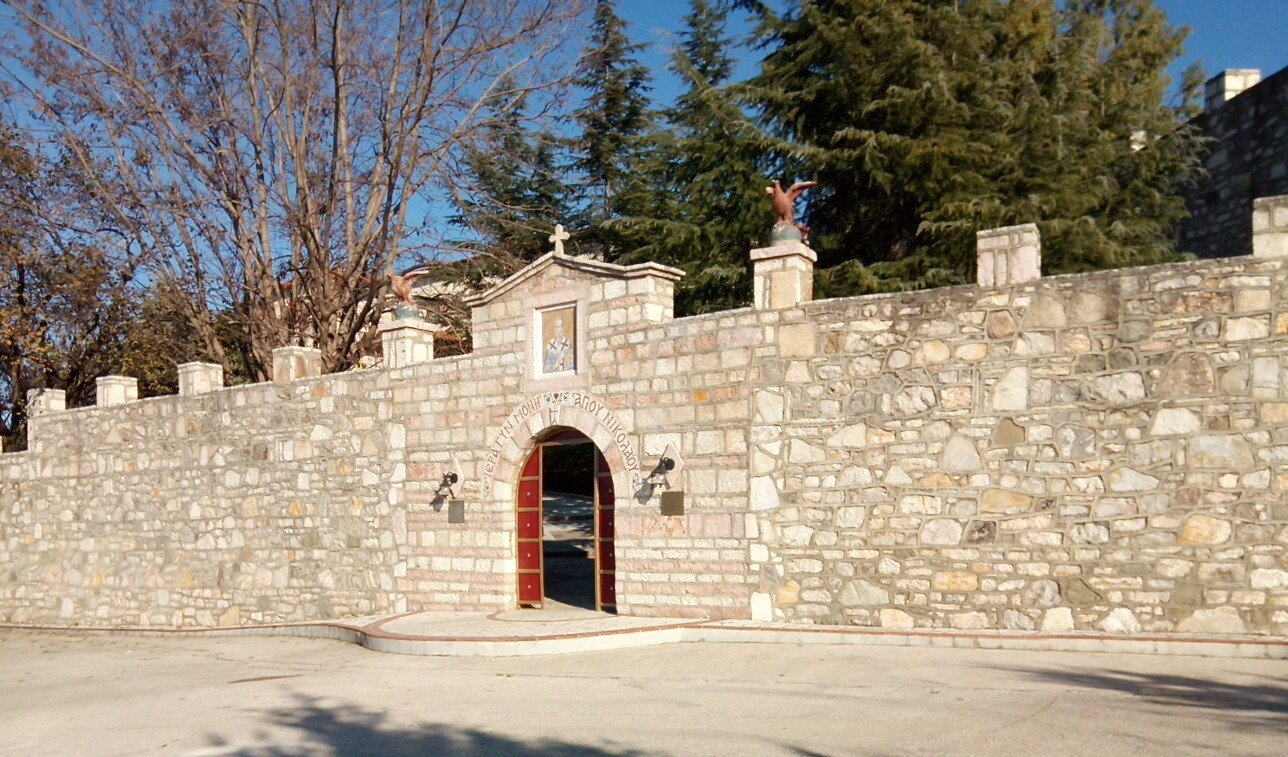
Entrance of Agios Nikolaos (Bala) Monastery (Paleomonastiro)

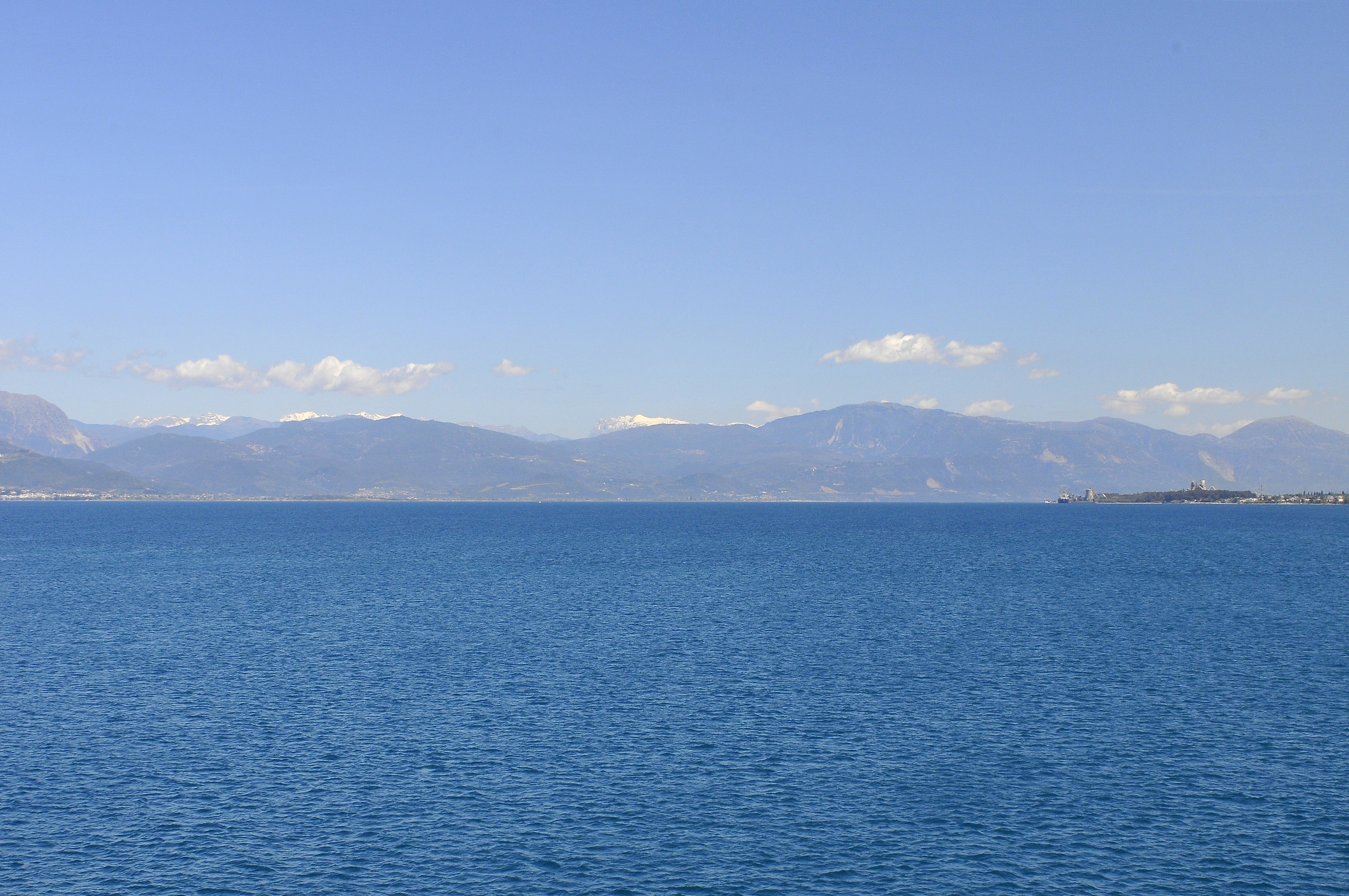
View to the Gulf of Patras

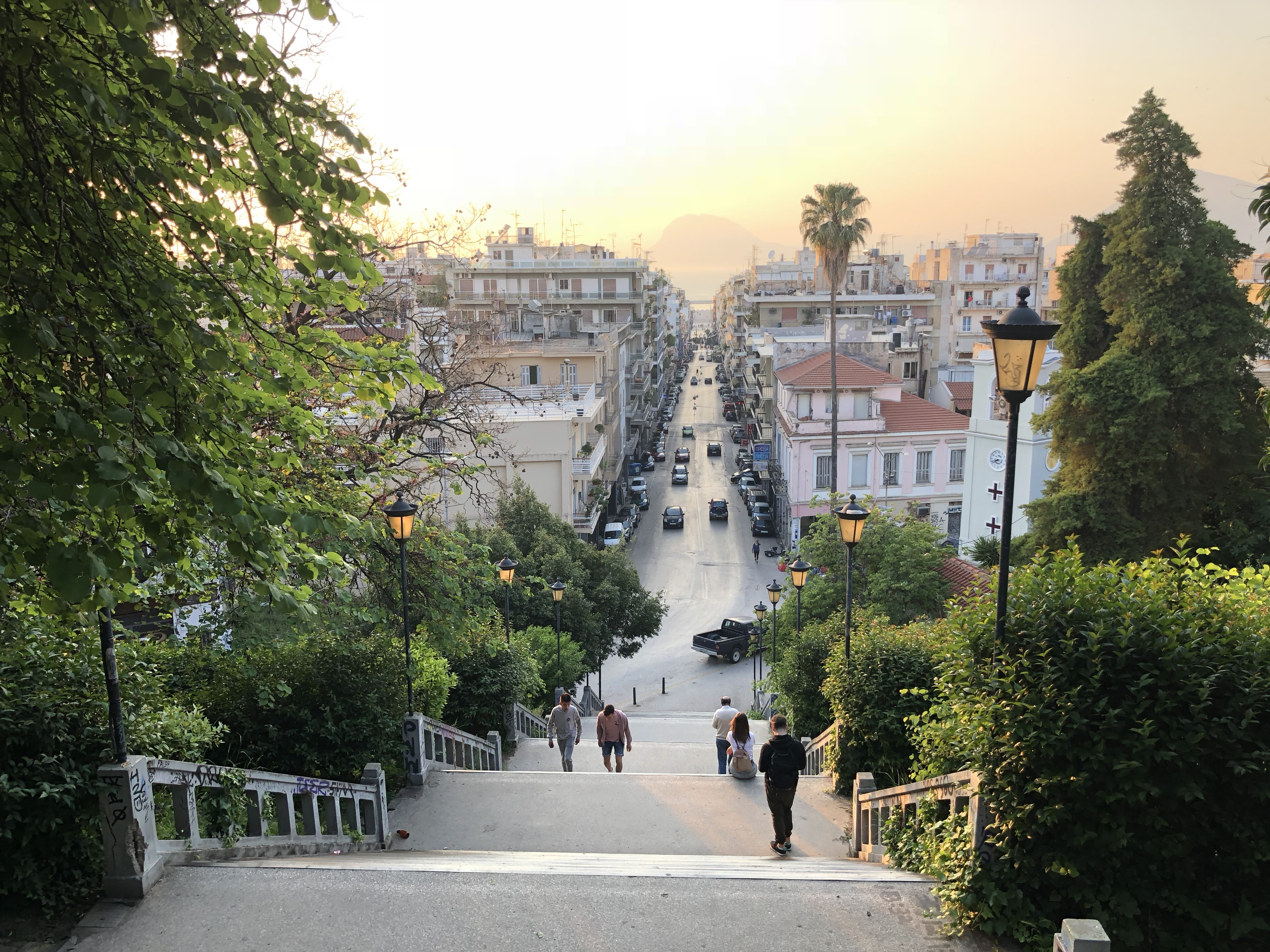
City view from Agiou Nikolaou steps

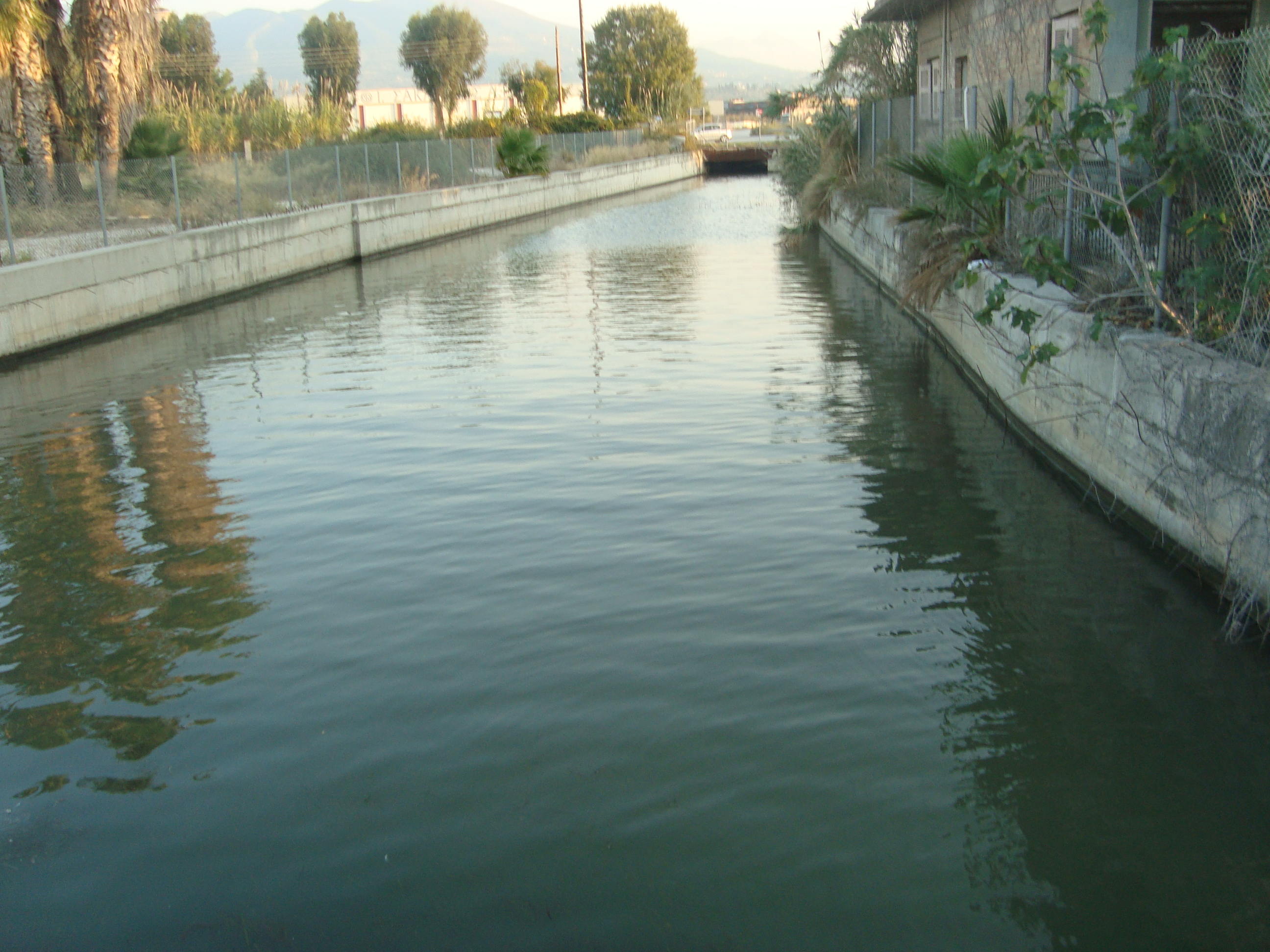
A view of Panagitsa (stream) in 2011.

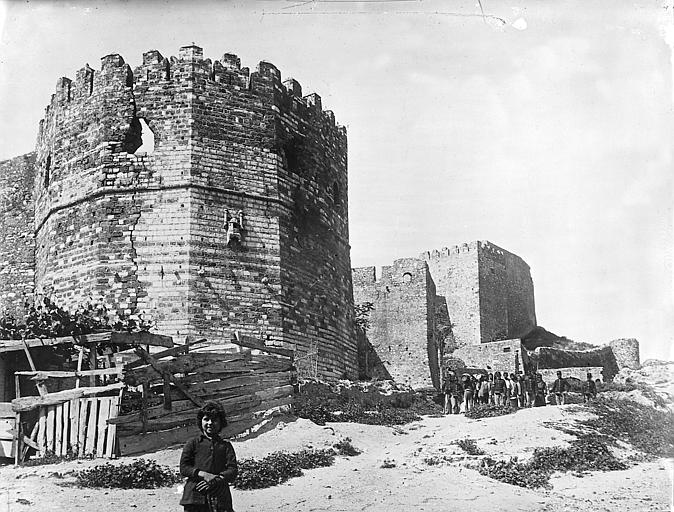
The castle of Patras, photograph of the 19th century

== See also ==
- Patras Carnival
- University of Patras
- University of Peloponnese
- Apollon Theatre (Patras)
- List of settlements in Achaea
- Panachaiko
- Cities in Greece
