= Sports in Patras =

Sports clubs based in Patras, Greece.

== Main sports clubs ==
| Club | Sport | Current league * | Venue | Location | Capacity | Established | Highest ranking |
|---|---|---|---|---|---|---|---|
| Panachaiki G.E. | Football | Football League | Kostas Davourlis Stadium | Agyia | 11,321 | 1891 | 4th (1973) |
| Panachaiki G.E. | Volleyball | A2 League | Panachaiki Indoor Arena | Agyia | 500 | 1928 | 8th (2016) |
| Apollon Patras | Basketball | Basket League | Apollon Patras Indoor Hall | Perivola | 3,500 | 1926 | 6th (1986) |
| E.A. Patras | Volleyball | B Ethniki | EAP Indoor Hall | Agios Dionysios | 2,200 | 1927 | Champion (1938) |
| NO Patras | Water polo | A2 Ethniki | NOP Aquatic Centre | Akti Dymeon | 3,000 | 1929 | Champion (x 8) |
| Thyella Patras | Football | Regional Championship | Fotis Aravantinos Stadium | Glafkos | 3,000 | 1930 | 5th (B Ethniki) |
| Olympiada Patras | Basketball; Volleyball | A2 League; B Ethniki | Olympiada Indoor Hall | Taraboura | 2,500 | 1961 | 8th (2002); 10th (2007) |
| Promitheas Patras | Basketball | Basket League | Dimitris Tofalos Arena | Bozaitika | 4,500 | 1985 | 2nd (2019) |
| NE Patras | Water polo | A2 Ethniki; A1 Women's | Antonis Pepanos Aquatic Centre | Koukouli | 4,000 | 2006 | 4th (2009); 4th (x 3) |
Currently defunct clubs
| Olympiakos Patras | Football | EPS Achaias | Prosfygika Stadium | Prosfygika | 5,000 | 1925 | 7th (B Ethniki) |
| AO Patrai | Football | EPS Achaias | Ovrya Stadium | Ovrya | 2,500 | 1967 | 10th (B Ethniki) |
| Ormi Patras | Handball | A1 Women's | Dimitris Tofalos Arena | Bozaitika | 4,500 | 2003 | Champion (x 6) |

- (*) Season 2014-15

== Clubs ==
- Apollon Patras - basketball: second division, volleyball: third division
- Apolloniada Patras - regional championship
- Achilleas Patras AC - regional championship
- AEK Patras FC - regional championship
- Aetos Patras - regional championship
- Aris Patras
- A.O. Ampelokipi Patras
- A.O. Anagenisi Patras
- Agyia FC - Patras (Agyia), regional championship
- Albatross Glyfadas Patras - regional championship
- AS Apollo Eglikadas - regional championship
- Aris - regional championship
- Astrapis Psarofai - Patras (Psarofai), regional championship
- Atlantida Girokomeiou - Patras, regional championship
- Atromitos Patras - regional championship
- Atromitos Zarouchleika Patras - Patras (Zarouchleika) - regional championship
- Dafni FC
- Dafni Kalavrita
- Diakopto AC - Diakopto - regional championship
- Doxa Chalandritsas FC - Chalandritsa, regional championship
- Doxa Paralias - Paralia, regional championship
- Doxa Niforeika
- Elpida Egklykadas - Eglykada, regional championship
- Esperos AOPA Patras - basketball, fourth division
- Ethnikos Patras - regional championship
- Filia Patras - regional championship
- Galini Patras
- Iraklis Patras - regional championship
- Iraklis Leykas
- Kypros Patron AC - regional championship
- P.A.O. Kritikon Patras
- NE Patras - Patras, men water polo: second division, women water polo: first division
- NO Patras - Patras, water polo: first division
- APS Olympiakos - regional championship
- Olympiakos Patras F.C. - regional championship
- Olympiada Patras, basketball: second division, volleyball: third division
- A.O. Omonia Patras
- Ormi Patras - handball: first division
- Pampatraikos - regional championship
- Panachaiki - Patras, football: second division, volleyball: first division, basketball: fourth division
- Panionios Achilleas Agyias AU - Patras (Agyia), regional championship
- Pelopas Patras
- Perivola A.O.
- APS Patrai - Patras, football: fourth division
- PAS Patraikos - regional championship
- E.A. Patras - Patras, volleyball: first division, basketball: fourth division
- Patreas - regional championship
- Pigasos Begoulakiou FC, regional championship
- Pirsos Patras
- Proodevtiki - regional championship
- A.O. Psilalonia Patras
- Skakistikos Omilos Patras
- Thyella Patras F.C. - football, regional championship
- A.P.S. Zavlani - football, fourth division

== Elsewhere in the municipality ==
- Panachaikos Souli

== Defunct teams ==
- Foinikas Patras - Patras
- Patraikos A.O. - football, merged in 2005, now part of Panachaiki
- Poseidonas Patras AU - women water polo, now part of NE Patras
- Thriamvos Patras - water polo, now part of NE Patras
