= Voud, Patras =

Vοud (Greek: Βούδ) is a neighbourhood in the central part of the city of Patras, Greece, 1 km from the downtown. Voud is linked with Lontou Street.

== Nearest neighbourhoods ==
- Vlatero
- Psilalonia
- Skagiopouleio

== Voud Square ==
Today in the neighbourhood features Voud Square, in the area around 1850, it had a villa owned by the English grape trader Thomas William Wood (1816–1894) who moved to Patras in 1834. In the villa there are ancient artifacts and busts of Artemis (4th century BC) and Iacchos (2nd century AD), etc. The ancient council was donated by Frederick Wood in the Archeological Museum of Patras.

== Geography ==
It is in a hilly setting and is residential, with forests found to the north.

== History ==
The area were made up of farmlands until housing developments arrived in the late-19th and the early-20th centuries. It was made up of neoclassical buildings. After World War II and the Greek Civil War, they were replaced with six to eight story buildings which covers much of the area, but several neoclassical buildings remain today. Traffic lights were installed in the 1970s.
