= Langoura family =

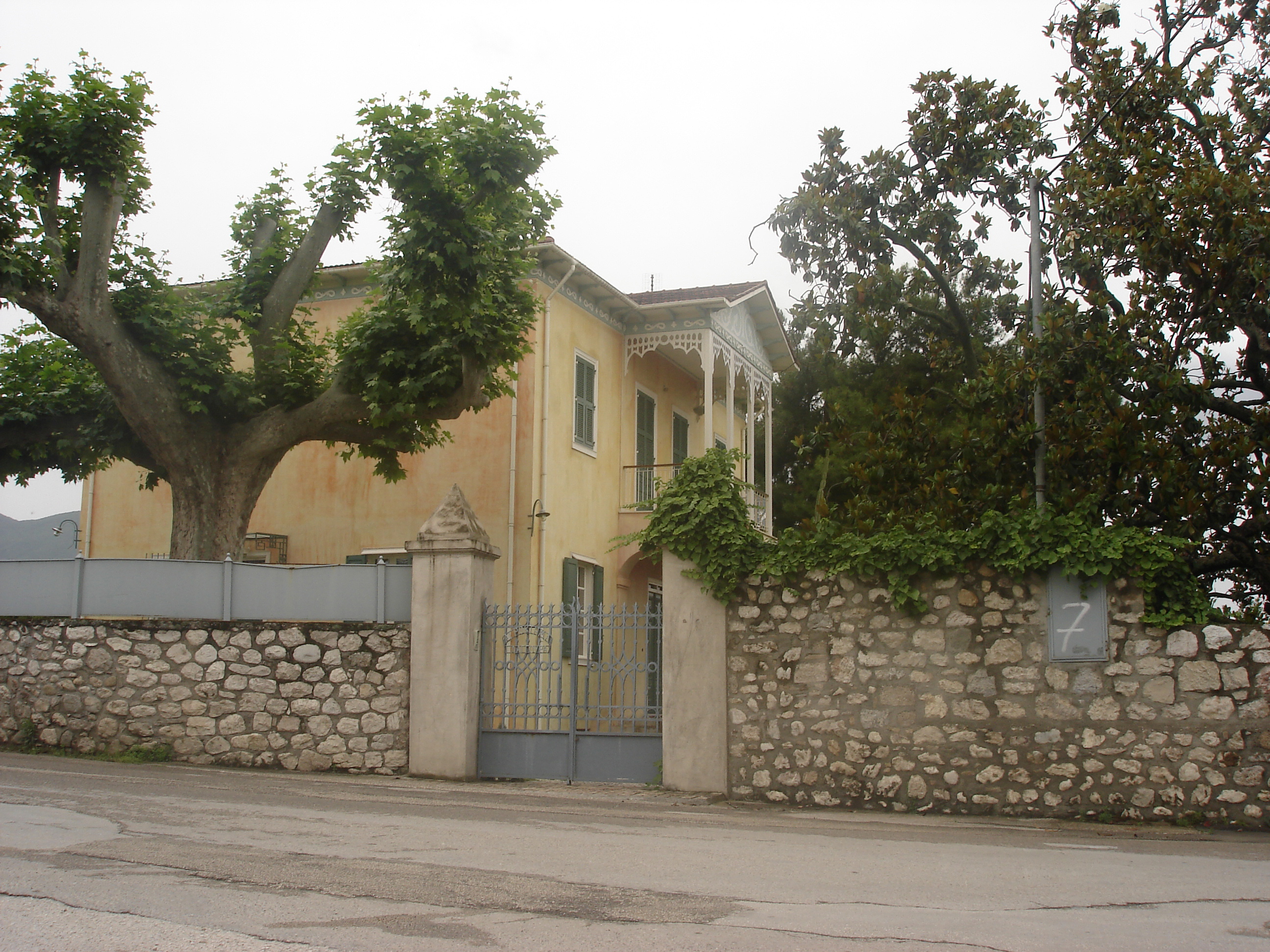
The Langoura family house in the neighbourhood of the same name

The Langoura or Laggoura (Greek: Λάγγουρα) family were a family in Patras, Greece in the neighbourhood of Agios Georgios Langoura that were company owners.

The older long form of the name was Langouropoulos (Λαγγουρόπουλος), in which after they are relocated to Livorno in Western Italy.

The family together with the contract of the area were inhabited in Patras a pro-revolutionary other than the trade mainly since they relocated to Livorno. Since 1828, it was always a member that presented as the only inhabitant from Patras.

The member of the family built a large estate from the company, of which and invested in their marked. They bought many properties in the area of Eglykada, Giorgios Langouras, farmed several small trees, etc., in parallel made a summer residence in which it still exist today. From that time, the area received the name of the family Agios Georgios Langoura. Today, the company is owned by the Andrikakos-Langoura family. The uses had a large immobile estate by Riga Fereou Street in which are made up of concrete at the Karabini narrows.

Importantly, the members of the family were Theodors Langouras, a public counsellor and financier of the public Apollo Theatre, Dimitrios, a trader, a landowner and councillor of the security company Anatoli ), Georgios, the first agriculturalist in Patras and landowner, Andreas, soldier of the race track, Maria in which brought important sum for the running of the Patras public hospital.
