= Zavlani =

Coordinates: 38°15′N 21°45′E

Zavlani (Greek: Ζαβλάνι) is a neighbourhood in the northeastern part of the city of Patras, 4 kilometres (2.5 mi) direct and 5 kilometres (3.1 mi) via road from the downtown core. The neighbourhood bears the football (soccer) club team named A.P.S. Zavlani and plays in the prefectural fourth division.

== Nearest places ==
- Skioessa, northeast

== Nearest neighbourhoods ==
- Sychaina, north
- Gouva, south
- Anthoupoli, west

== Information ==
The name is the corruption the name Zavr(l)os (Ζαβρ(λ)ος). During the Ottoman rule, the area was settled by Albanians. Another theory of the name is that comes from a family name Zavlanis, which descended from the island of Zakynthos.

== Geography ==
Zavlani is in a hilly residential setting with forests to the north. The neighborhood's length varies from 800 metres (2,600 ft) to 1 kilometre (3,300 ft), and its width ranges between 500 and 800 metres (1,600 and 2,600 ft). Its streets are approximately 8 to 10 kilometres (5 to 6 mi) long, of which 3 kilometres (2 mi) are main, and the remainder are residential.

== History ==
The area were made up farmlands until when housing developments arrived in the 1960s and the 1970s, the housing and its population slowed in the late-1980s. Its main production consisted of olive, cattle and fruits and vegetables as well as other crops and the populationm before the arrival of the housing developments were rural, today they are manufacturing and services especially outside the neighbourhood.

== Sporting clubs ==
- APS Zavlani
