= Achaia Channel =

Local television station in Achaia, Greece

- Country: Greece
- Headquarters: Maizonos St. 334, Patras

Ownership
- Owner: Achaia Radiotelevision S.A.

History
- Launched: 1992

Links
- Website: Official website

Availability

Terrestrial
- Digea: 28 UHF (Ano Doliana, Asea, Levidi); 36 UHF (Aroi, Kalavryta, Thermo); 37 UHF (Kranidi, Nafplio, Troezen); 41 UHF (Ainos, Fyteies, Ithaca, Koryfi, Zacharo); 42 UHF (Parnon, Anavryti, Kythira); 44 UHF (Petalidi, Aetos, Gargalianoi); 46 UHF (Xylokastro, Desfina, Geraneia, Lidoriki, Nemea)

Achaia Channel is a Greek local television station serving all of the Achaia prefecture. The station's name is translingual and the station headquarters is located in Patras. It offers movies, local programs and music, and programs and music from the United States, Australia and the United Kingdom. It broadcast programs from Seven X since it was its affiliate. Efthimios Kappos, the former owner of the Corinthian station Super TV, has been the station's major shareholder. From October 2022, it started a collaboration with Plus Media broadcasting the central news bulletin. It broadcasts in Peloponnese, southern Central Greece, Aetolia, Kythira, Phocis, in the Gulf of Corinth, in the Saronic Islands, in the southern Ionian Islands, Boeotia and in western Attica.

== Logo and slogan ==
Its logo was used between news clips with shakes that resembles an earthquake. The logo was later changed to a current logo with a large dot on the letter "i."

== Ownership ==
The station would be formerly managed by Achaia Channel S.A. Television, Radio, Production, Exploitation, Cassettes and Movies, which was established on December 18, 1992. The organization currently managing the station, Achaia Radiotelevision S.A., was established on December 21, 1998. On March 20, 1998, the channel's operation was legalized under the 6425/Ε license, by the Ministry for the Press. In August 2007, it moved its headquarters from Begoulaki to Maizonos St. On April 12, 2016, the station temporarily shut down, to move its facilities to the headquarters of Super TV in Corinth.

== Controversy ==
On March 3, 2010, 60 members of the All-Workers Militant Front irrupted inside the station's headquarters while its news bulletin was on air, to protest against the then-approved financial measures, that notably included the rise of the VAT at 2%, and the addition of a luxury tax to cars with value exceeding the 17.000 euros. What followed was a verbal conflict between the members and the station's owner. Meanwhile, the news bulletin would stop broadcasting, showing black instead.

== Closure ==
At the end of 2024, the NCRTV decided to delist Achaia Channel as it had stopped broadcasting since the previous year (2023) due to financial problems.

== See also ==
- List of Greek-language television channels
- List of companies of Greece
