= Eschatovouni =

Neighborhood in Patras, Greece

Eschatovouni (Greek: Εσχατοβούνι, meaning "nethermost mountain") is a neighbourhood in the northeastern part of the city of Patras. It is the final hill of Dasylio in which it takes the name Eschatovouni. This neighborhood is near the neighborhood of Gouva.
