= Tzini =

Coordinates: 39°24′N 22°18′E

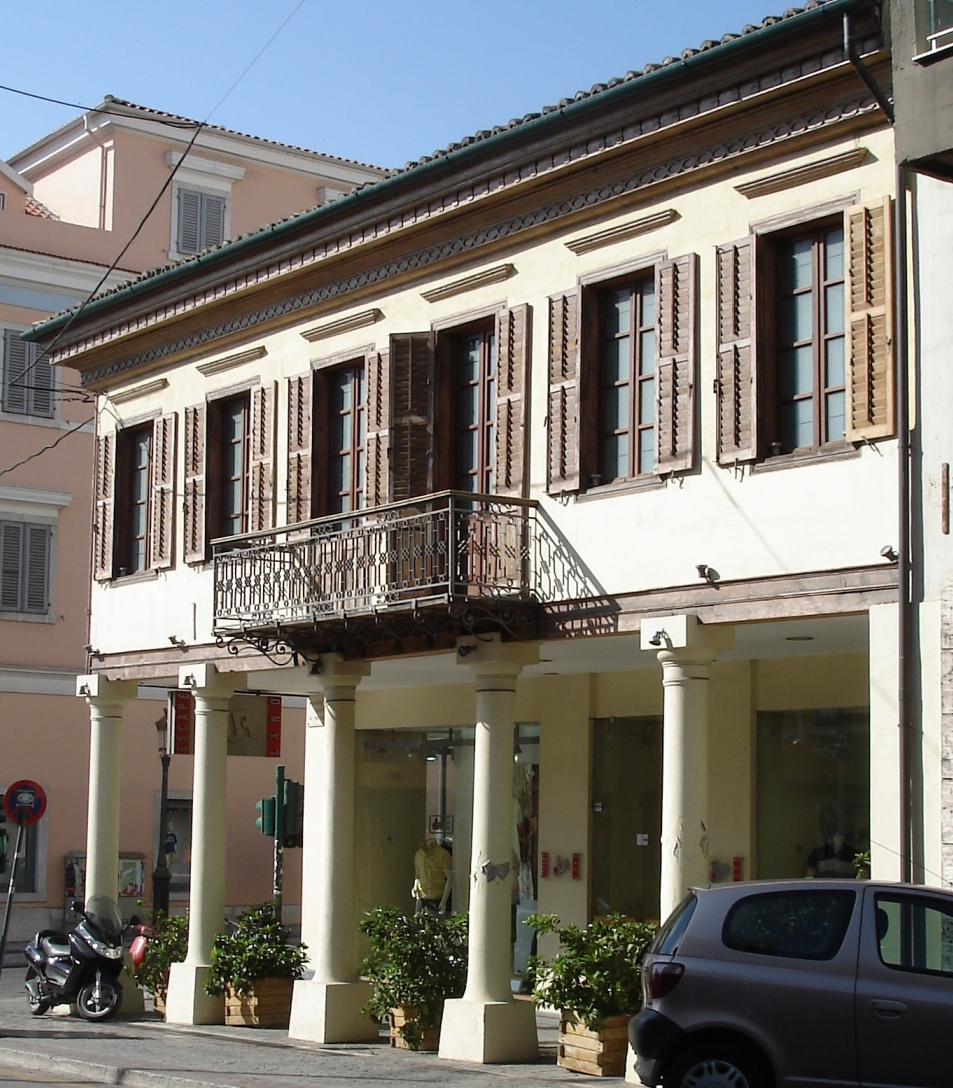
Tzini's house (1832)

Tzini (Greek: Τζίνη) is a neighbourhood in the central part of the city of Patras. It is named after the Tzini (Τζίνη) family which is descended from Epirus. In 1828, Theodoros Tzinis moved to Patras, and in 1831 built a house that still exists today by the side of Maizonos and Agiou Nikolaou Streets. The family bought large properties in the northwestern part of Patras, not far from Dasyllio.
