= Agios Nektarios =

Agios Nektarios may refer to:-

== Places ==
- Agios Nektarios, Patras
- Ágios Nektários, Poros

== Other ==
- Saint Nectarios, Agios Nektarios in Greek
- MV Agios Nektarios, an Empire F type coaster which sank near Patras in 1963
