= Kritika =

Kritika may refer to:

== Music ==
- Kritika ("Cretan"), type of Music of Crete

== Places ==
- Kritika, Corfu, a settlement in Corfu, Greece
- Kritika, Patras, a neighbourhood of the city of Patras in Achaea, Greece
- Kritika, Messenia, settlement in Messenia, Greece

== People ==
- Kritika Kamra (born 1988), Indian actress
- Kritika Pandey, Indian writer
- Princess Kritika of Nepal (born 2003)

== Media ==
- Kritika: Explorations in Russian and Eurasian History, a journal published by Slavica Publishers of Indiana University Bloomington
- Kritika (magazine), Hungarian magazine
- Kritika Kultura, a journal published by Ateneo de Manila University
- Kritika Daidalika: 20 Selected Essays in Memory of James T. Hooker on the Archaeology, Epigraphy and Philology of Minoan and Mycenaean Crete, by Gareth Alun Owens
- Kritika & Kontext, a Slovak-English cultural journal by Samuel Abraham

== See also ==
- Kratika Sengar (born 1985), Indian actress
- Krittika, the name of the Pleiades star cluster in Indian astronomy and astrology
- Krytyka, a Ukrainian intellectual monthly/bi-monthly magazine with contributions in Ukrainian (since 1997) and English (since 2014), published by Krytyka Group
