= Kotroni Airport =

Kotroni Airport / Naval Helicopter Base Kotroni Βάση Ελικοπτέρων (ΒΕΝ/ΝΟΚ) Κοτρόνι
- Location in Greece
- IATA: none; ICAO: LGKN

Summary
- Airport type: Military
- Owner: Hellenic Navy
- Operator: Hellenic Navy
- Location: Kotroni, Marathonas, Attica
- Elevation AMSL: 682 ft / 207 m
- Coordinates: 38°08′15.71″N 23°57′05.51″E
- Interactive map of Kotroni Airport / Naval Helicopter Base Kotroni

Runways
Direction	Length		Surface
Direction	ft	m	Surface
03/21	1,005	307	Asphalt
12/30	1,938	590	Asphalt

Kotroni Airport (ICAO: LGKN) is a small airport situated west of Marathonas, Greece. It has one of the smallest runways in the world. Both runways are mostly used by helicopters because Kotroni is normally a base for the Hellenic Navy Helicopter Command. To indicate that helicopters land at the site, the airport has helipad signs on the surface of the runways. It also contains 4 helipads, which are on the runway and 16 helicopters' parking positions.

The terrain around Kotroni Airport is hilly to the north west, but to the southeast it is flat. A bay of the sea is near Kotroni Airport to the southeast. The highest point nearby is Mount Pentelicus, 1,109 meters above sea level, 8.7 km southwest of Kotroni Airport. Closest major community is Acharnes, 19.9 km west of Kotroni Airport. In the area around Kotroni Airport there are unusually many named peninsulas, islands and bays. The climate in the area is temperate. Average annual temperature in the neighborhood is 18 °C . The warmest month is August, when the average temperature is 28 °C, and the coldest is January, at 8 °C. Average annual average is 812 millimeters. The rainy month is December, with an average of 154 mm rainfall, and the driest is July, with 13 mm rainfall.

Kotroni Airport

Climate chart (precipitation, max. and min. temperature)
J	F	M	A	M	J	J	A	S	O	N	D
- █ Average max. and min. temperatures in °C
- █ Precipitation totals in mm
Imperial conversion
J	F	M	A	M	J	J	A	S	O	N	D
- █ Average max. and min. temperatures in °F
- █ Precipitation totals in inches
