= Koukouli =

Koukouli (Greek: Κουκούλι) may refer to:

- Koukouli, Patras, a district of Patras city, Greece
- Koukouli, Ioannina, a village in the Ioannina regional unit, Greece
- Koukouli, Preveza, a village in the Preveza regional unit, Greece
- Koukoulion, a traditional headdress worn by monks in the Eastern Orthodox Church
