= Riganokampos =

Neighbourhood in Patras, Greece

Coordinates: 38.227°N 21.775°E

Riganokampos (Greek: Ριγανόκαμπος, meaning "plain where oregano grows") is a neighbourhood in the eastern part of the city of Patras by the foot of the Panachaiko mountains.

Riganokampos is located east of the A5 Patras Bypass. Close by are the villages of Elekistra and Neo Souli.

== History ==
During the Byzantine period, a stauropegic church dedicated to Saint Irene was built in the area, to house the body of the saint. On 5 March 1231, during the Frankish rule, the Latin archbishop of Patras, Antelm of Cluny, moved the relic to the Monastery of Hautecombe in Savoy. The relic was returned on 5 October 2002 and is housed in a new church dedicated to the saint, on the same site as the medieval church.
