= Aroe =

Aroe may refer to:

- The Aru Islands Regency, islands in eastern Indonesia
- Aroe, an alternative name for Aroi, Patras, in western Greece.
- ARoE, short name for the Arab Republic of Egypt.
