= Panagiotis Skagiopoulos =

Greek merchant

Panagiotis Skagiopoulos Παναγιώτης Σκαγιόπουλος
- Born: 1864; Patras, Greece
- Died: 1942 (aged 77–78); Patras, Greece
- Occupation: writer

Panagiotis Skagiopoulos (Greek: Παναγιώτης Σκαγιόπουλος, 1864–1942) was a Greek merchant and was a grape trader of a large company, the largest part that he help the philanthropic sentinel, a transaction that he done as he loved in Patras. In 1926, he built an orphanage centre where it still exist today in the city. The neighbourhood of Skagiopouleio is named after him.
