= Tritaki =

Neighborhood of Patras, Greece

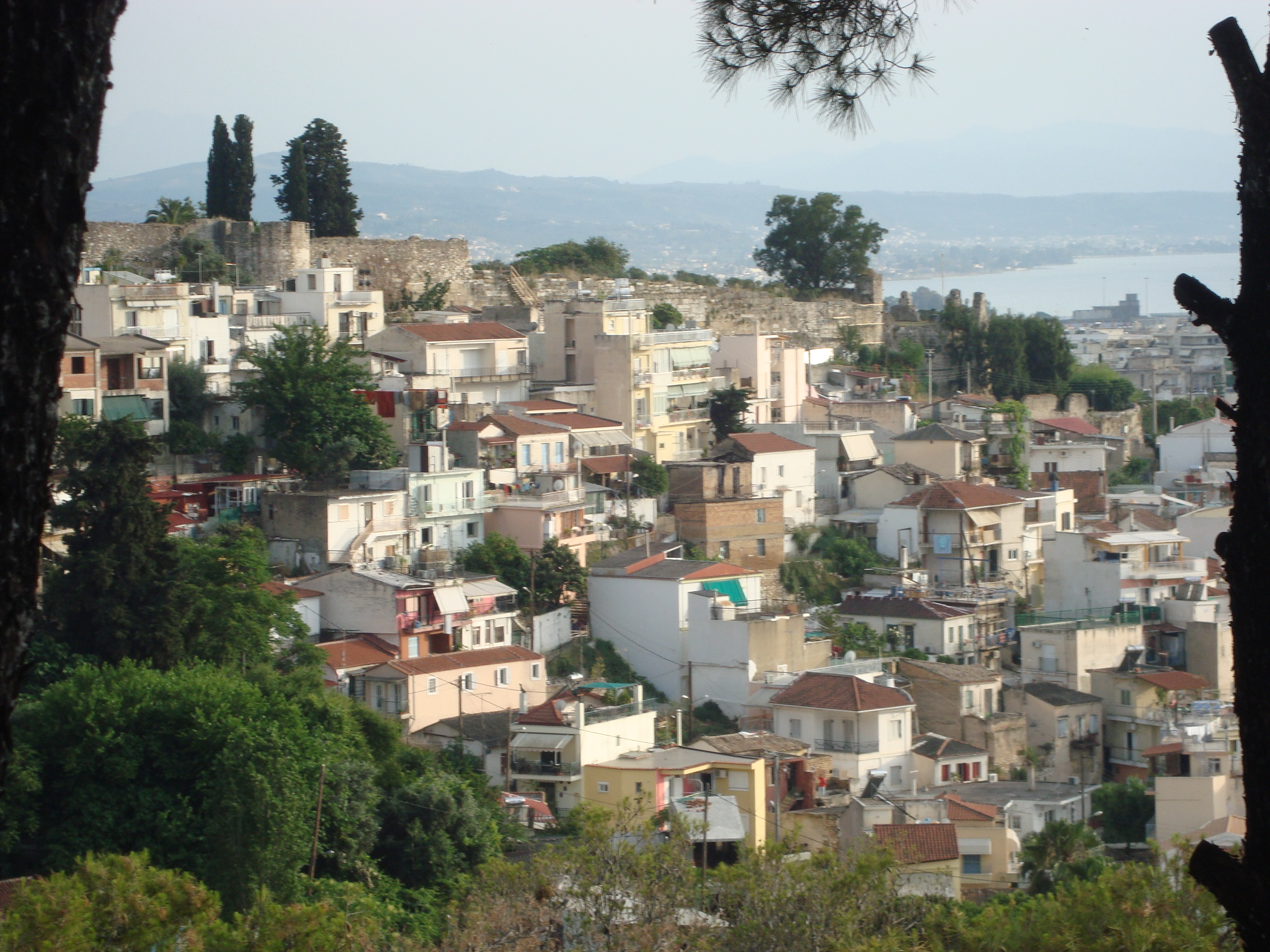
Tritaki

Tritaki (Greek: Τριτάκη) is a neighbourhood in the old town of Patras. It consists of a part of the district of Vlatero. The neighborhood is known for its old houses, small pedestrian roads and stairs that lead to the Patra's Castle

Today view

Today, in the district there have been renovations mostly in Tritaki stairs, which is the most known place of the district.

Tritaki Stairs

Tritaki stairs, is one of the many stairs that exist in Patras. It connects the city centre with the Castle. Usually, tourists use it to arrive at the city centre more easily. The stairs are not big but they have a wonderful view and the houses with the gardens around give an island vibe.
