= Kantrianika =

Neighbourhood in Patras, Greece

Kantrianika (Greek: Καντριάνικα) is a neighbourhood in the city of Patras. The origin of the name comes from factories which existed during the Byzantine period. The origin of the word is from kantria (κάντρια) + Ioanni (Ιωάννη meaning John, son of Danielis) and means the factories of John.
