= Terpsi, Patras =

Neighborhood of Patras, Greece

Terpsi (Greek: Τέρψη, meaning "pleasure") is a neighbourhood in the city of Patras. The settlement was created in 1945 a little higher than Chalkomata. The area used to be vineyards. It received the name from the homonymous street there.

== Bounding neighbourhood ==
- Chalkomata
