= Kapodistria Square =

Square in Patras, Greece

Kapodistria Square or Markatou Square is a square in Patras, Greece in Markato district.

The square dates to the years of post-revolutionary Greece, when the new Patras was designed by Stamatis Voulgaris under orders by Ioannis Kapodistrias.

A bust of Kapodistrias is located in the square.
