= Agios Nektarios, Patras =

Greek city

Agios Nektarios (Greek: Άγιος Νεκτάριος, meaning "Saint Nektarios") is a neighbourhood in the east-southeastern part of the city of Patras, 2.5 kilometres (1.6 mi) direct and 3 kilometres (1.9 mi) via road from the downtown core. Agios Nektarios is linked with Akrotiriou Street which is 2 kilometres (1.2 mi) long and serves and is also the EO33 road (Patras-Tripoli) for the southbound lanes.

The neighbourhood is bordered with Damaskos Street to the north as well as the forest, farmland to the east, a small stream to the south and west and another street to the west.

== Nearest subdivisions ==
- Agia Aikaterini or Gyftika, northwest
- Drosia, north

== Streets ==
- Akrotiriou Street
- Damaskou Street
- Ionias Street
- Pontou Street

== Geography ==
Its geography are residential with forests by the stream and the northern portion. Its total area is approximately 2 square kilometres (0.77 mi^{2}), its length is 1 kilometre (0.62 mi) from north to south, and from east to west.

== History ==
Farmlands dominated the neighbourhood until the 1960s and the 1970s. Housing boomed in the western and the eastern sections. It was the city's southeasternmost urban limit until that time when it extended southeastward in the 1970s. Farm production at the time consisted of olive, citrus, cattle and rarely other crops. Residential homes were added between the 1960s to the north and the 1970s to the east. The population slightly boomed until the 1990s when the neighbourhood ran out of space. Until 1995, Akrotiriou had traffic volumes high when the EO33 road moved 3 kilometres (1.9 mi) south by the Glafkos river.
