= Aroi =

Aroi may refer to:

- Aroi, Patras, Greek neighborhood in Patras
- Kenas Aroi (1942-1991), Nauruan politician, President of Nauru in 1989
