= Pyrosvesteio =

Coordinates: 38°15′06″N 21°44′33″E

Pyrosvesteio (Greek: Πυροσβέστειο, meaning "fire department") is a neighbourhood in the city of Patras, Achaea, Greece.
