= Agia Sofia, Patras =

Coordinates: 38.257°N 21.743°E

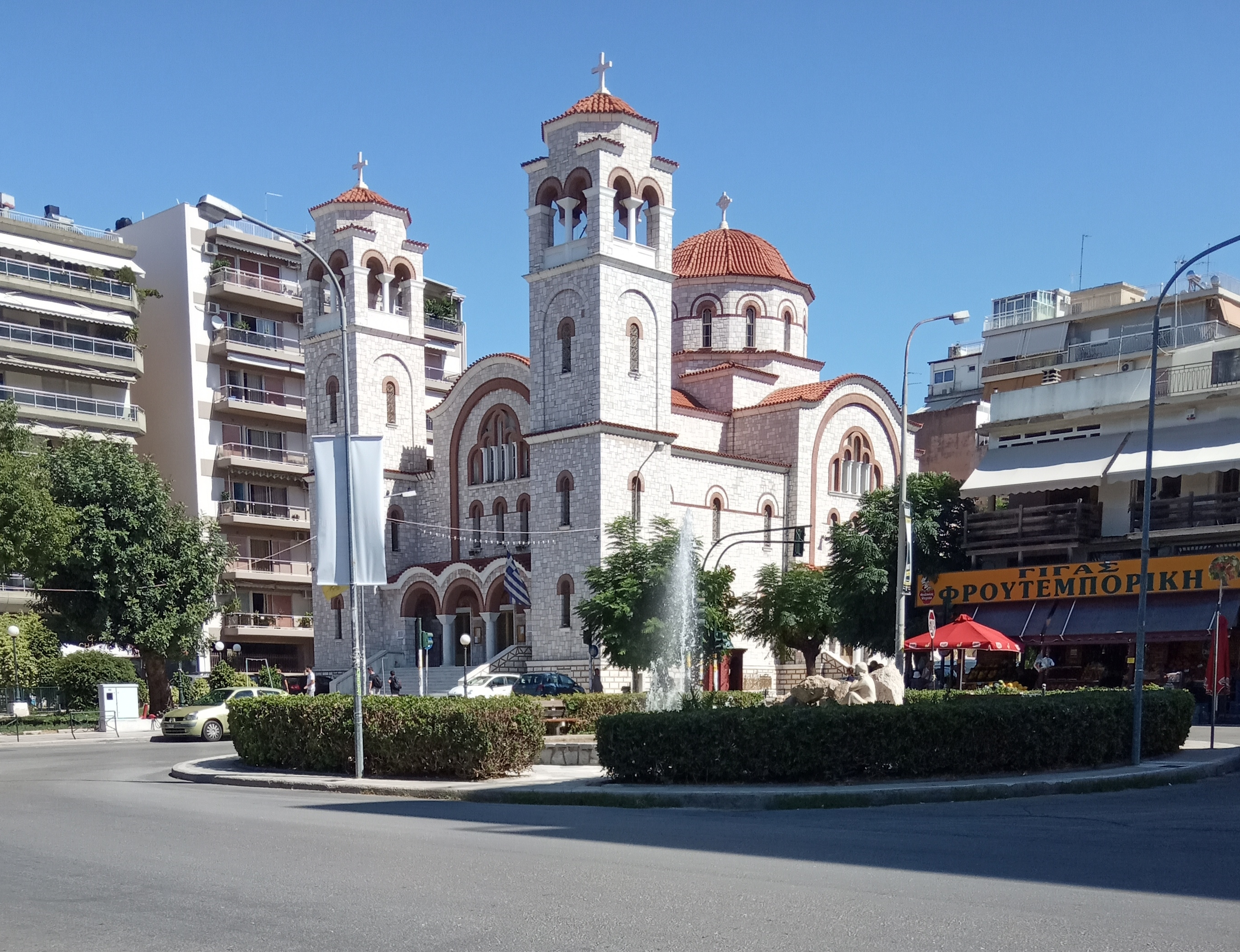
View of Saint Sophia Greek Orthodox church in Patras, Greece (2019)

Agia Sofia (Greek: Αγία Σοφία, meaning "Holy Wisdom") is a neighbourhood that lies directly north of the centre of Patras, Greece. It takes its name from the Agia Sofia (Saint Sophia) church, which is the main church of the neighbourhood. The church is one of the largest in Patras and it is dedicated to the 6th-century Christian martyr Saint Sophia.

It is one of the most densely populated areas of Patras. Because of the proximity of the district to the centre of the city, it is the place for many businesses and the usual choice of accommodation for the students of the University of Patras. At the centre of the neighbourhood is Nikis Square, at the intersection of Agias Sofias Street and Konstantinoupoleos Street. Agia Sofia lies near the seaside. Several important roads, including Greek National Road 8 (Corinth - Patras), pass through Agia Sofia. The old metric railway that connects Patras and Rion passes through the western part (Panachaiki stadium train stop).

== Main streets ==
- Agias Sofias Street
- Athinon Street
- Ellinos Stratiotou Street
- Iroon Polytechneiou Street
- Konstantinoupoleos Street
- Korinthou Street
- Navmachias Ellis Street
- Pente Pigadion Street
- Zakynthou Street
- Thessalonikis Street

== Schools ==
- 26th Primary School (26o Demotiko) located in the heart of Agia Sofia with a rich history spanning over 80 years. During the German occupation, the school was used as the local Commandatur HQ and on the roof of the school the base of the turret of the machine gun is still present
- 31st Primary School (31o Demotiko)
- 6th High School - (6o Gymnasio)
