= Theodoros Tzinis =

Greek independence fighter

Theodoros Tzinis (Greek: Θεόδωρος Τζίνης) (c. 1798 - 1869) was a Greek fighter of the Greek War of Independence.

He was born in Kompoti, Arta in about 1798 and was the main friend of Nikolaos Skoufas, a leader of Filiki Etaireia. He battled against the Turks in Messolongi and was one of the organisers of the escape. After the escape, he settled in Patras, in 1828. He founded a neighbourhood in 1831 and bought property in the modern centre of the city and built his house. From that time, his family received the name to the neighbourhood (Tsivdi) of the city. In Patras, he was educated with the grape company and married Eleni Papapostolou, with whom he raised six children.

He died in Patras.
