= Synora, Patras =

Neighborhood in Patras, Greece

Coordinates: 36°48′N 22°30′E

Synora (Greek: Σύνορα, meaning "borders") is a neighbourhood and a settlement in the city of Patras. It is named because it was the border in which made the visitors in the years which supported the revolution. The area that time was the outer part. Synora housed when the K.E.T.E.S. ('Κ.Ε.Τ.Ε.Σ., Κέντρο εκπαιδεύσεως τεχνικού Ελληνικού στρατού). The military base today has been closed and moved to the place where it build the square with greenspaces and the new Patras courthouse. In the 1920s, the area saw refugees arrived from Constantinople, the modern Istanbul.
