= Pantokratoras, Patras =

Neighbourhood in the city of Patras, Achaea, Greece

Coordinates: 38°14′35″N 21°44′24″E

Pantokratoras (Greek: Παντοκράτωρας, meaning "Christ Pantocrator") is a neighbourhood in the city of Patras, Achaea, Greece.
