= Psarofai =

Psarofai (Greek: Ψαροφάι, the name is anthroponymic literally meaning "eating fish") is a neighbourhood in the east central part of the city of Patras, Greece, 3 km east-southeast of the downtown core. Several of its streets have been named after places in Asia Minor.

== Streets ==
- Ellispontis Street
- Ionias Street, named after the historic Ionia
- Georgiou Papandreou Street, a part of the Greek National Road 33
- Pontou Street, named after the historic region Pontus in modern northern Turkey

== History ==
The area was named Psarofai in the years after the Greek Revolution of 1821. The area consisted of olive groves and vineyards, belonging to the land owner Psarofagi Intzirka. However, several other origins of the name have been suggested. Before 1960, when urban development of the area started, it was full of orchards. Its new residents mainly came from the area of Tritaia. The torrent Diakoniaris flows through Psarofai, and has often flooded the area.
