= Zygmunt Mineyko =

Polish-Greek nobleman, army officer and scientist

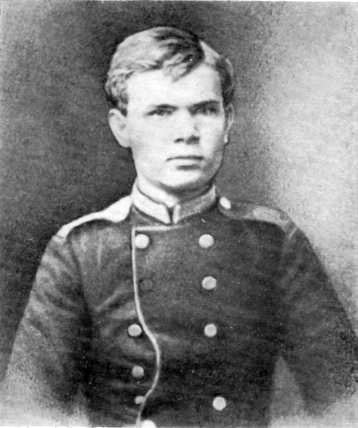
- Mineyko in 1858
- Born: 1840; Balvanishki, Russian Empire (now Ashmyany district, Grodno region, Republic of Belarus)
- Died: 27 December 1925 (aged 84–85); Athens, Second Hellenic Republic
- Education: Nicholas General Staff Academy; École Militaire
- Relatives: Georgios Papandreou (son-in-law); Andreas Papandreou (grandson); George Papandreou (great-grandson)
- Military career
- Allegiance: Polish National Government; Kingdom of Greece
- Branch: Hellenic Army
- Conflicts: January Uprising; Franco-Prussian War; Greco-Turkish War (1897); Balkan Wars; First Balkan War; Battle of Bizani; Second Balkan War
- Awards: Gold Cross of the Order of the Redeemer; Virtuti Militari

Zygmunt Mineyko (Greek: Ζίγκμουντ Μινέικο; 1840 – 27 December 1925) was a Polish nobleman, army officer, scientist and engineer who later became a naturalized Greek citizen and a public figure in Greece. His son-in-law Georgios Papandreou, his grandson Andreas Papandreou, and his great-grandson George Papandreou all became Prime Ministers of Greece.

== Childhood and youth ==
Mineyko was born into the family of Stanisław Jerzy Mineyko and Cecilia Szukiewicz in Balvanishki, Russian Empire (nowadays — Zyalyony Bor, Ashmyany district, Grodno region, Belarus). The Mineykos belonged to the szlachta of the Polish–Lithuanian Commonwealth. One of Mineyko's ancestors was among the signatories of the Union of Horodło in 1413, and the family possessed many estates in what is now Poland and Belarus.

== Anti-Russian uprising ==
In 1858 Mineyko graduated from a Vilna high school. His brother-in-law, Aleksander Tydman was a close relative of the Russian general Eduard Totleben (1818–1884). Totleben helped Zygmunt to enroll into the best Military Academy in Russia – the Nicholas General Staff Academy in Saint Petersburg. After the Russian Empire lost the Crimean War and was weakened economically and politically, an unrest started on the lands of the former Polish–Lithuanian Commonwealth. In 1861, Mineyko returned home to spread anti-Russian agitation among the Polish and Belarusian population. Being under the persecution of the Russian government he escaped to Italy, where he taught the war fortification at the Military School in Genoa. The school trained volunteers for a future anti-Russian uprising.

When the January Uprising in the former Polish–Lithuanian Commonwealth against the Russian Empire bursted, Mineyko returned home. He organized and led a guerrilla brigade in the region of Ashmyany. After being defeated by Russian forces, Mineyko was arrested and sentenced to death. Only with the help of the bribes given to Russian officials and selling of family estates, he managed to escape the death penalty and was sent to a 12-year Katorga in Siberia.

On the way to exile, Mineyko encountered French prisoners, also sentenced by Russians for their participation in the January Uprising. He memorized their names to pass the information on to French authorities in the future.

== In France ==
In 1865, Mineyko managed to escape from Siberian exile. He left the Russian Empire on English ship under the name of count von Meberthe. The revolutionary travelled to Europe. In Paris, he met Napoleon III to inform him about the French officers, participants of the January Uprising, whom he had met in Siberia. When Alexander II of Russia visited France in 1868, the Emperor of the French brought up the subject of the French prisoners in Siberia. The Russian monarch could not deny the list of specific names. Soon, these prisoners were released. The French government thanked Mineyko by granting him an opportunity to study at École Militaire in Paris. After graduating with a degree in civil engineering, Mineyko led construction of railways, bridges and channels in Bulgaria, Turkey and Greece. In 1870 he fought for France in the Franco-Prussian War.

== In the Ottoman Empire ==
Mineyko then worked for 20 years in the service of the Ottoman Empire, building roads, railways, and bridges in Bulgaria, Thrace, Thessaly, and Epirus. He became chief engineer of Epirus and Thessaly provinces, then part of the Ottoman Empire. In 1878 he made a sensational archaeological discovery, when his expedition found traces of the major ancient sanctuary of Zeus in Dodona. The researcher created the ethnological map of Epirus, wrote numerous works on Greek topography. During this time, he established closer links with circles of the Greek intelligentsia, and came to establish similarities between Polish and Greek histories and struggles for freedom.

== In Greece ==
In 1880 Mineyko married Persephone Manaris from Patras, the daughter of the renowned Greek mathematician Spyridon Manaris, principal of the famous Zosimaia School of Ioannina. Their family had a neoclassical mansion, now demolished, in Psilalonia square. In 1891 their family settled in Athens. Mineyko was appointed as a chief engineer of the Public Work Ministry of Greece. He also was a member of the executive committee for Crete in 1896, and in 1897 he was head of the topographic section of the General Staff of the Greek Army.

He participated in the construction and restoration of the Olympic facilities, including the Panathinaiko Stadium which hosted the first modern Olympic Games in 1896. During the Games, Mineyko wrote reports from the Olympic arena for the Polish newspaper "Czas". He wrote letters for Polish periodicals in Kraków and Lwow for many years, presenting the problems of Greek politics and ethnic questions from a pro-Hellenic point of view.

Mineyko took part in the Greco-Turkish war of 1897. During the First Balkan War, in 1913, his strategic plans became crucial in achieving the decisive Greek victory at the battle of Bizani, which led to the capture of Ioannina and Epirus by Greece. As an engineer and head of the cartographic service of the Greek General Staff, and with his prior knowledge of the region, he prepared a plan for the outflanking movement which led to the taking of the strongly fortified Turkish position of "Bizani", which sealed entry to the Ioannina Valley. In November 1919, the affair became famous when, during the trial of General Staff Officers, the Athenian journals "Patris" and "Nea Ellas" revealed Mineyko's contribution. For this achievement, he then received the Golden Cross of the Redeemer.

Zygmunt worked as a chief engineer of the Public Works Ministry until August 1917, when he suffered a heart attack. His illness led to his resignation.

In 1911 and 1922, Mineyko was able to visit his homeland, the Second Polish Republic. He died on December 27, 1925.

== Papandreou dynasty ==
Zygmunt Mineyko and Persephone Manaris raised two sons and five daughters. One of their daughters, Sophia, married Georgios Papandreou, the Governor of Chios who later served three terms as Prime Minister of Greece (1944–1945, 1963, 1964–1965). Sophia's son, Andreas Papandreou, was born in Chios in 1919. A Greek economist, and a socialist politician, he served three terms as Prime Minister of Greece (1981–1989 (two consecutive), 1993–1996).

In 1984, Andreas Papandreou visited General Wojciech Jaruzelski in Poland. It is assumed, he concerned himself with the opportunity to explore his grandfather's homeland village in Soviet Belarus. However, he was told that Balvanishki had no longer existed. This was due to communists renaming the village to Zyalyony Bor during the Khrushchev era.

The son of Andreas Papandreou and the great-grandson of Zygmunt Mineyko, George Papandreou became the third member of the Papandreou family to serve as the country's prime minister (2009–2011). He has mentioned his background, telling about his maternal great-grandfather who came to live in Greece.

== Honours and legacy ==
Mineyko could speak Polish, Lithuanian, Russian, French, Turkish, and Greek, as well as an horseman and hunter.

Mineyko was a prominent Freemason. A Lodge called Vox Ukrainia, belonging to the Grand Orient du Russie, initiated him. Later he became a member of the Grand Orient de France, of the Grand Orient of Italy and of the Loges Panhellenion and Pythagoras of the Grande Loge de Grece, where he was extremely active. He also belonged to the Supreme Council of Greece of the Masonic Old and Accepted Scottish Rites. When he died, thousands of Masons attended his funeral in Athens.

The Greek parliament acknowledged Mineyko by proclaiming him honorary citizen of Greece in 1910. After the end of the First Balkan War, he was also conferred upon the highest award of Greece, the Gold Cross of the Order of the Redeemer (1913).

While travelling to the Second Polish Republic in 1922, Mineyko received Polish military awards, such as the Virtuti Militari Cross, the rank of veteran-colonel and Doctor Honoris Causa from the University of Jan Kazimierz.

Mineyko deposited his memoirs and articles in the Library of Jagiellonian University, and donated his numismatic collection to Vilnius University. A book of his memoirs, Z tajgi pod Akropol: Wspomnienia z lat 1848-1868 (in Polish), was published in Warsaw in 1971.

One of the streets in the Belarusian town of Ashmyany is named for Mineyko.
