= Evraiomnimata =

Coordinates: 38.2410°N 21.7430°E

Evraiomnimata (Greek: Εβραιομνήματα, meaning "graves of Jews") is a neighbourhood in the city of Patras, Achaea, Greece.

In the past, in the area, there was the cemetery of the Jewish community of the city.
