= Terpsithea, Patras =

Neighborhood of Patras, Greece

Terpsithea (Greek: Τερψιθέα, literally meaning "pleasant views") is a neighbourhood in the city of Patras, Achaea, Greece.
