= A.E.P. Olympias Patras =

Multi-sport club in Patras, Greece

A.E.P. Olympias Patras
Full Name	A.E.P. Olympias Patras
Official Emblem
Founded	1961
Nicknames	Olympics, Olympians
Titles
Anthem
Club colours	Orange and White
Chairman	Nikos Bogonikolos
Websites	Official Website

A.E.P. Olympias Patras (Greek: Α.Ε.Π. Ολυμπιάς Πάτρα) or Olympiadas Patras (Greek: Ολυμπιάδα Πάτρα), is a Greek multi-sport club that is located in Patras. It was founded in 1961. A.E.P. Olympias is one of the most historic athletic unions in Patras. The athletic union's team colors are orange and white. The club's current president is Nikolaos Bogonikolos.

== History ==
The athletic union was founded in 1961, in a tavern that was owned by Birba, at Messolongiou and Fotila Streets. The first sporting club departments of the parent athletic association included: track and field, basketball, volleyball, and cycling. The club's first board of directors meeting was held on December 26, 1961, and the club's first general assembly meeting took place on April 15, 1962.

== Departments ==
- Olympias Patras B.C. - men's basketball
- Olympias Patras V.C. - men's volleyball
- Olympias Patras Women's Basketball
- Olympias Patras Women's Volleyball
- Olympias Patras Junior Volleyball
- Olympias Patras Track and Field
- Olympias Patras Bicycling
- Olympias Patras Tennis

=== Men's basketball ===
The basketball team, Olympias Patras B.C., participated in the Greek A2 League from 1977 until 1981. They competed in the top Greek League in the 2006-07 season and the 2007-08 season. They also participated in the FIBA EuroCup during the 2007-08 season.

=== Women's basketball ===
The women's basketball team has competed in the Greek B League since the 1989–90 season.

=== Men's volleyball ===
One of the most historic sports departments of the club is the men's volleyball club, which participated in the Greek Volleyball First Division in 1965–66, 1969–70, 2000–01, and 2001–02. From 1981 to 1983, the men's volleyball club played in the Greek Volleyball Second Division, and in 1987, it played in the Greek Volleyball Third Division.

=== Women's volleyball ===
The women's volleyball section has made numerous appearances in the national categories and has also competed in the Greek Volleyball A2 Division.

=== Junior volleyball ===
The junior volleyball section finished in second place in the Junior Volleyball National Championships that were held in Athens in 2006.

=== Track and field ===
The biggest achievement of the track and field department was a second-place finish in the Panhellenic climax, after Panellinios GS. That track team featured many athletes from Greece, and it entered into many local championships in all of their categories. The most famous athlete of the department was Nikos Angelopoulos, who achieved victory in the Balkan Track And Field Games in Sofia, in 1980, in the men's 200m with a record time of 20.71.

=== Bicycling ===
The club's cycling department no longer exists today.

=== Tennis ===
Olympias' tennis club plays in its closed arena in the neighborhood of Taraboura in a 2,500-seat arena, which was constructed in 2001. Before that, it played in an open field in the neighborhood of Prosfygika. The arena is located at 24 Tisonas Street. Its postal code is 26223.

== Titles ==
=== Men's basketball ===
- Greek A2 League Champion: (2006)
- Greek B League Champion: (2003)
- 4x Achaea Champion: (1965, 1967, 1968, 1998)

=== Women's basketball ===
- 2x Achaea Champion: (1994, 1999)

=== Men's volleyball ===
- Greek Regional Champion: (1970)
- Achaea Champion: (1970)

=== Women's volleyball ===
- Greek B League Champion: (1997)
- Achaea Champion: (1970)
