= Diakou, Patras =

Diakou (Greek: Διάκου) is a neighbourhood in the city of Patras. The area was known as Selachagia (Σελαχαγιά) during the Ottoman era from one of the Turkish landowners with that name.

It was named Diakou (deacon's), after the Greek independence, by a priest (Cyrillos Giannakopoulos), also landowner in the area.
