= Geraneika =

Neighbourhood in Greece

Geraneika (Greek: Γερανέικα) is a neighbourhood in the city of Patras, Achaea, Greece.
