= Kypseli, Patras =

Neighbourhood in Patras, Greece

Kypseli (Greek: Κυψέλη, meaning "hive") is a neighbourhood in the city of Patras, Achaea, Greece.
