= Ashmyany district =

District of Grodno region, Belarus

Ashmyany district Ашмянскі раён (Belarusian) Ошмянский район (Russian)
- District
- Flag Coat of arms

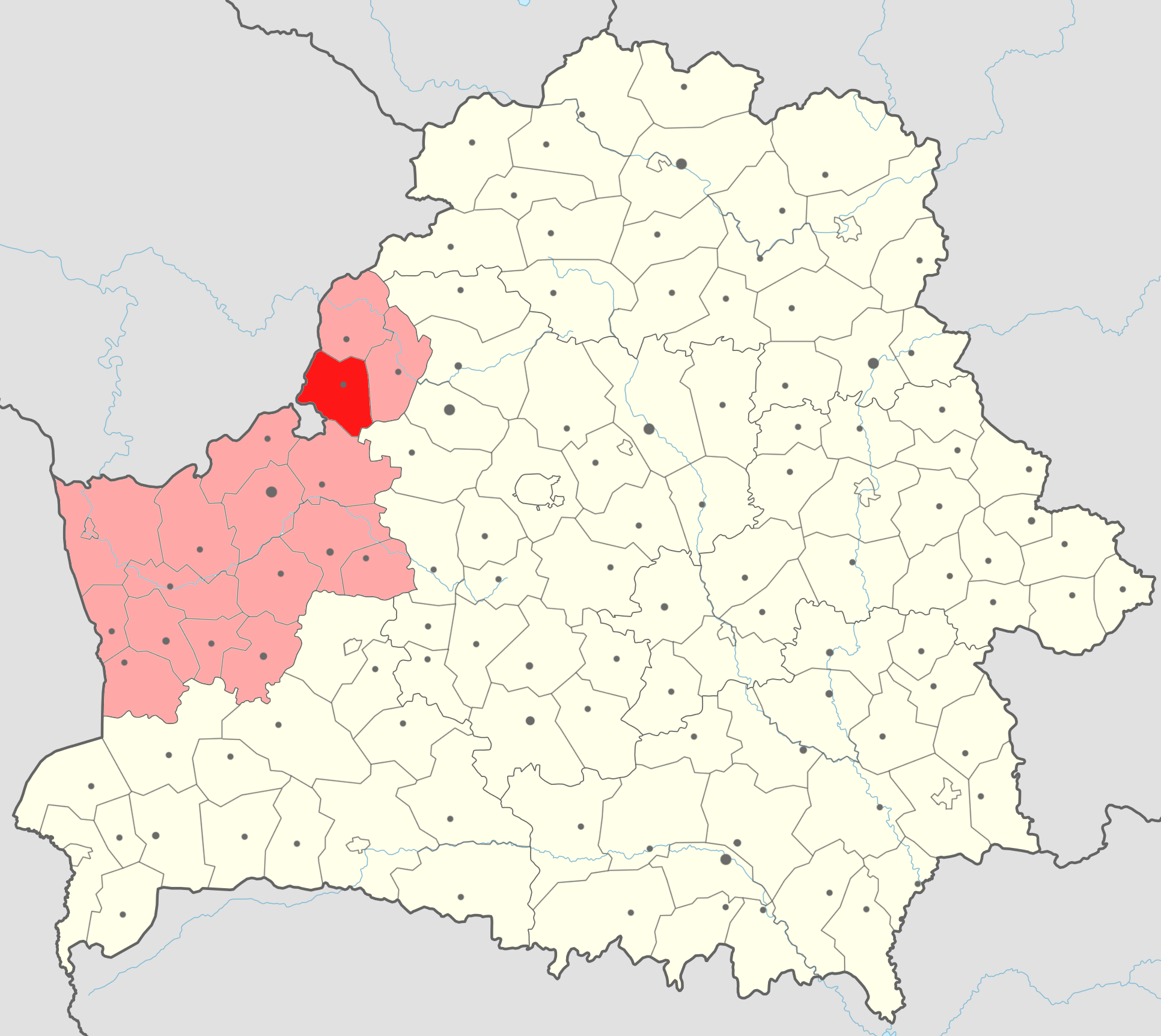
- Coordinates: 54°17′29″N 26°02′43″E
- Country: Belarus
- Region: Grodno region
- Administrative center: Ashmyany

Area
  - District: 1,215.92 km^{2} (469.47 sq mi)

Population (2024)
  - District: 29,133
  - Density: 23.960/km^{2} (62.055/sq mi)
  - Urban: 16,787
  - Rural: 12,346
- Time zone: UTC+3 (MSK)

Ashmyany district or Ašmiany district (Belarusian: Ашмянскі раён, romanized: Ashmyanski rajon; Russian: Ошмянский район, romanized: Oshmyansky rayon) is a district (raion) of Grodno region in Belarus. The administrative center is Ashmyany. As of 2024, it has a population of 29,133.

== Notable residents ==
- Zygmunt Mineyko (1840, Zialony Bor – 1925), a leading figure of the January Uprising on the territory of Belarus
