= Vryseika =

Vryseika (Greek: Βρυσέικα or Βρυσαίικα) is a neighbourhood in the city of Patras, Achaea, Greece.
