= List of neighbourhoods in Patras =

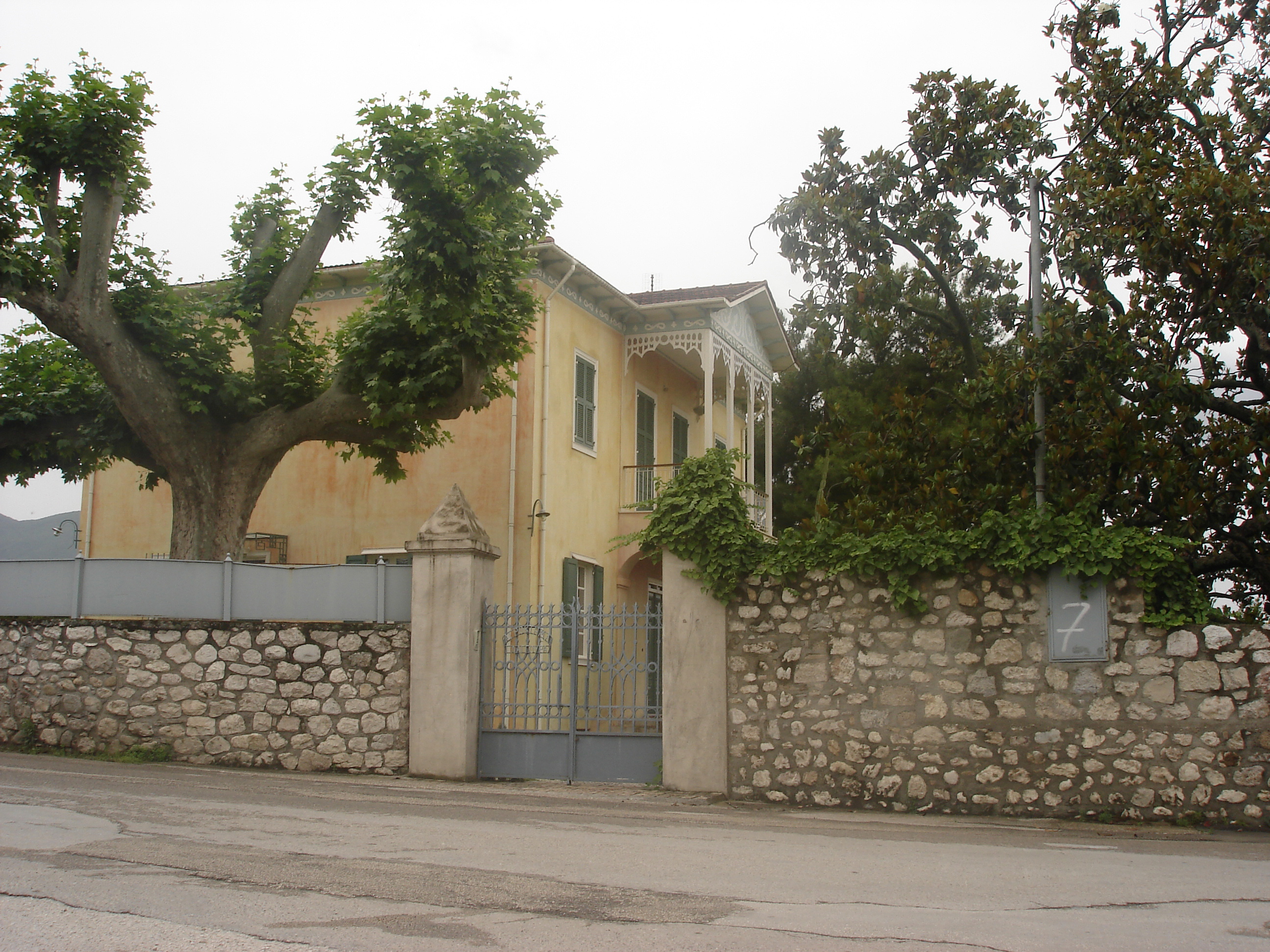
Lagouras house

This article is a list of neighbourhoods in Patras, Greece.

Neighborhood	Location
Agia Aikaterini (Gyftika)	east, east central
Agia Sofia	north
Agia Triada	central
Agialexiotissa	east
Agios Alexios	north
Agios Andreas	central, south central
Agios Georgios Langoura	east, southeast
Agios Dimitrios	east
Agios Dionyssios	central
Agios Nektarios	east, southeast
Agyia (Mesa and Exo)	north
Ampelokipoi	north
Anapirika	south
Antheia	south
Anthoupoli	north
Aroi	east
Asyrmatos	east
Begoulaki	east, southeast
Bozaitika	north
Chalkomata or Halkomata	central
Dasylio	central
Diakou	east
Drosia	east, east central
Eglykada	east
Eschatovouni	central
Evraiomnimata	central
Geraneika	central
Girokomeio	east
Glaraki	central
Glyfada	north
Gouva	north, northeast
Ities	south
Kalamaki	-
Kaminia	-
Kantrianika	central
Kastellokampos	north
Kavouri	-
Kokkinos Milos	south
Kolonaki	-
Kotroni	north
Koukouli	east, southeast
Kritika	central, east central
Krya Iteon	south
Kypseli	south
Ladopoulou	south
Lefka	south
Lykochoro	east
Makrygianni	east, southeast
Markato	central
Metamorfosi Sotiros	south
Neapoli	south
Pagona	east
Pantokratoras	central
Perivola	east, southeast
Portes (Rodopoulou)	south, southeast
Pratsika	east
Proastio	north
Prosfygika	east
Psachou	south
Psarofai	east, southeast
Psilalonia	central
Pyrosvesteio	central
Riganokampos	east
Skagiopouleio (Gyri)	central
Skioessa (Voudeni)	north
Synora	east
Tabachana	central
Taraboura	east, southeast
Terpsi	south
Terpsithea	north
Tritaki	central
Tsivdi	central
Tzini	central
Vlatero	north, northeast
Voudi	central
Zarouchleika (Glafkos)	south
Zavlani	north
