= Kaminia, Patras =

Neighbourhood in the city of Patras, Achaea, Greece

Kaminia (Greek: Καμίνια, meaning "kilns") is a neighbourhood in the city of Patras, Achaea, Greece. Kaminia is a seashore neighbourhood with a beautiful beach that is open for visitors to explore
