= Agialexiotissa =

Coordinates: 38°14′17″N 21°45′01″E

Agialexiotissa (Greek: Αγιαλεξιώτισσα) is a neighbourhood in the city of Patras, Achaea, Greece. "Αγιαλεξιώτισσα" is a local naming/adjective identification of Virgin Mary.
