= Glyfada, Patras =

Neighbourhood of the city of Patras, Achaea, Greece

Glyfada (Greek: Γλυφάδα, meaning "brackish") is a neighbourhood in the city of Patras, Achaea, Greece.
