= Moira, Achaea =

Moira Μοίρα
- Community
- Location within Greece
- Coordinates: 38°9′N 21°51′E
- Country: Greece
- Administrative region: West Greece
- Regional unit: Achaea
- Municipality: Patras
- Municipal unit: Patras

Population (2021)
  - Community: 45
- Time zone: UTC+2 (EET)
  - Summer (DST): UTC+3 (EEST)

Moira (Greek: Μοίρα) is a village located southeast of Patras, Greece. Moira had a population of 65 in 2011. Moira was part of the municipality of Patras between 1845 and 1912, and again after 1997. Between 1912 and 1997, it was an independent community.

== Geography ==
Moira is situated in the valley of the river Glafkos. The Panachaiko mountain lies to the northeast.

== Population ==
Year	Population village	Community population
1981	165	-
1991	134	-
2001	43	73
2011	51	65
2021	31	45

== See also ==
- List of settlements in Achaea
