= Psachou =

Neighborhood in Patras, Greece

Psachou (Greek: Ψάχου) is a neighbourhood in the city of Patras, Greece. It is named after the doctor named Dimitris Psachou which he took place in the Balkan Wars and World War II who settled in the area. It is located near Glafkos in Patras.
