= Lykochoro, Patras =

Neighbourhood in the city of Patras, Achaea, Greece

Lykochoro (Greek: Λυκόχορο) is a neighbourhood in the city of Patras, Achaea, Greece.
