= Neapoli Patras =

Neighbourhood in the city of Patras, Achaia, Greece

Neapoli (Greek: Νεάπολη Πάτρας) is a neighbourhood in the city of Patras, Achaea, Greece.

Initially, there was a district with the current name in 19th-century Patras, north of the Vlateros district, according to a city plan by Stamatios Voulgares, but it fell into disuse and ceased to be heard in the city.
