= Makrygianni, Patras =

Neighbourhood in the city of Patras, Achaea, Greece

Makrygianni (Greek: Μακρυγιάννη) is a neighbourhood in the city of Patras, Achaea, Greece.
