= Anthoupoli, Patras =

Coordinates: 38°23′N 24°03′E

View of the Anthoupoli area with the mountain mass of Panachaiko in the background.

Anthoupoli (Greek: Ανθούπολη, meaning "city of flowers") is a neighbourhood in the northern part of the city of Patras. The area was built from the area of the new archeological museum which is built from the sea and saw new subdivisions. Characteristically it is the great School Group of Anthoupoli which features several schools, except for the range of the area is Sychaina up to the elevation and Ampelokipoi near Paneipstimiou Street.
