= Skagiopouleio =

Neighborhood of Patras, Greece

Coordinates: 38°14′08″N 21°43′58″E

Skagiopouleio (Greek: Σκαγιοπούλειο) is a neighbourhood in the southern part of the city of Patras.

It was founded in 1926 as well as an orphanage center and it is named after Panagiotis Skagiopoulos for the aid of orphanages from the wars, the name is still used into the present day. From 1923, the neighbourhood incorporated Chalkomata. The older name of the area was Gyri (Γύρι) or Giri. The origin of the name is said by the people of Patras to be from the rides that began and ended in Psilalonia and which it made it into the area in which they turned back and returned. One of the oldest basketball clubs in the city, the A.O. Skagiopouleio which participated five times in the First Division category, is located in this neighborhood.
