= Rodopoulou =

Neighborhood in Patras, Achaea, Greece

Rodopouloυ (Greek: Ροδόπουλου) is a neighbourhood in the city of Patras, Achaea, Greece. Its alternative name is Portes (Greek: Πόρτες, meaning "doors").
