= Tabachana =

Coordinates: 38.241°N 21.742°E

Tabachana (Greek: Ταμπάχανα) is a neighbourhood and a settlement in the city of Patras. The name is of Turkish origin named during the Ottoman period and it means tanning, Virsodepsia (Βυρσοδεψεία) in Greek. During the Ottoman period it had tanning spots in the city and when the Greeks came as well as from other countries. Today it is a quiet neighbourhood in Patras with the homonymous square (Filiki Etaireia).
