= Pratsika =

Human settlement in Greece

Pratsika (Greek: Πράτσικα) is a neighbourhood in the southern part of the city of Patras, Greece. The neighbourhood was known as Portes (Πόρτες) and was known by this name because it had one of the Gates to the city. Around 1800, several lands were brought by Sideris Pratsikas who lived in Droviani in Epirus, from whom it receives its current name.
