= Agios Alexios, Patras =

Coordinates: 38.2556°N 21.74086°E

Agios Alexios (Greek: Άγιος Αλέξιος, meaning "Saint Alexius") is a neighbourhood in the city of Patras, Achaea, Greece. The name comes from the namesake church of St. Alexius which is located beside Ellinos Stratiotou Street almost 2 km from the city's centre. In a short distance from the church there is a large building which serves as a branch of IKA which is the largest Social Security Organisation in Greece.

== Gallery ==
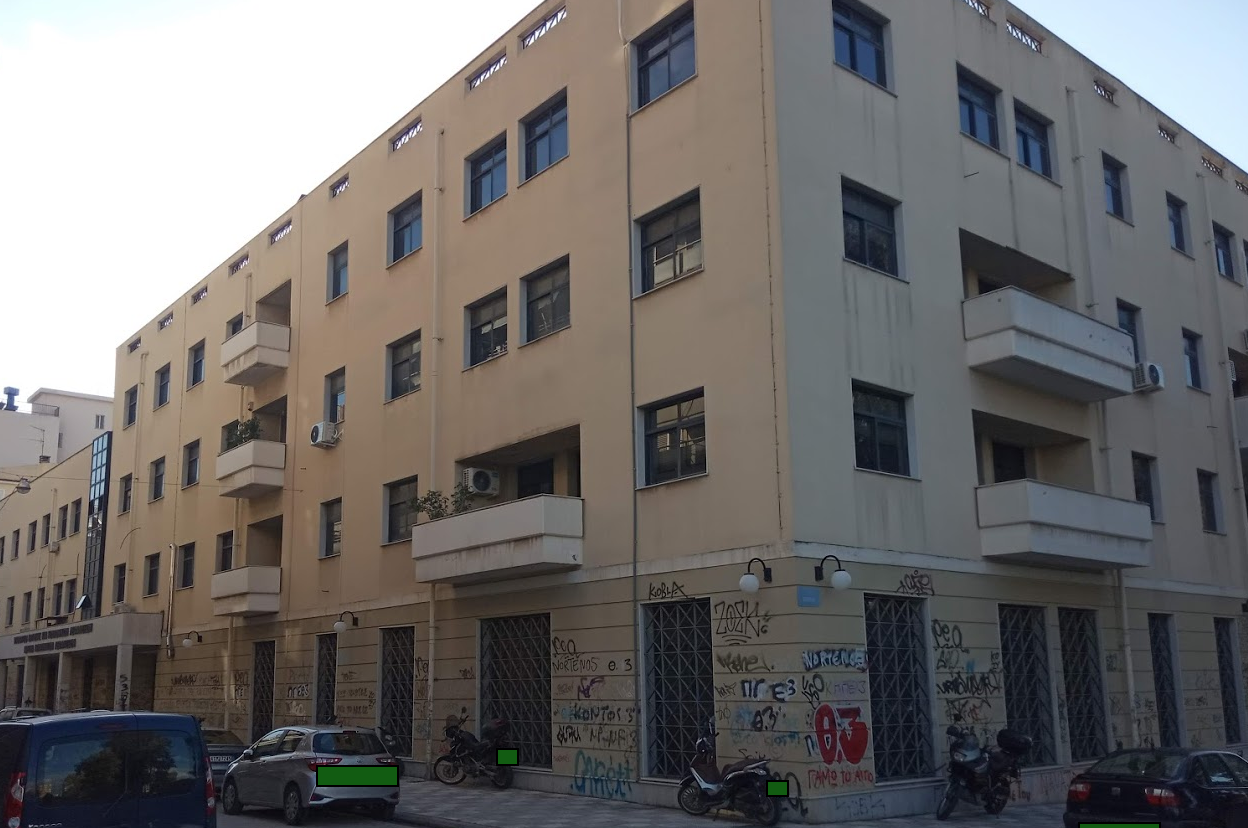
IKA branch, Agios Alexios, Patras (2019)

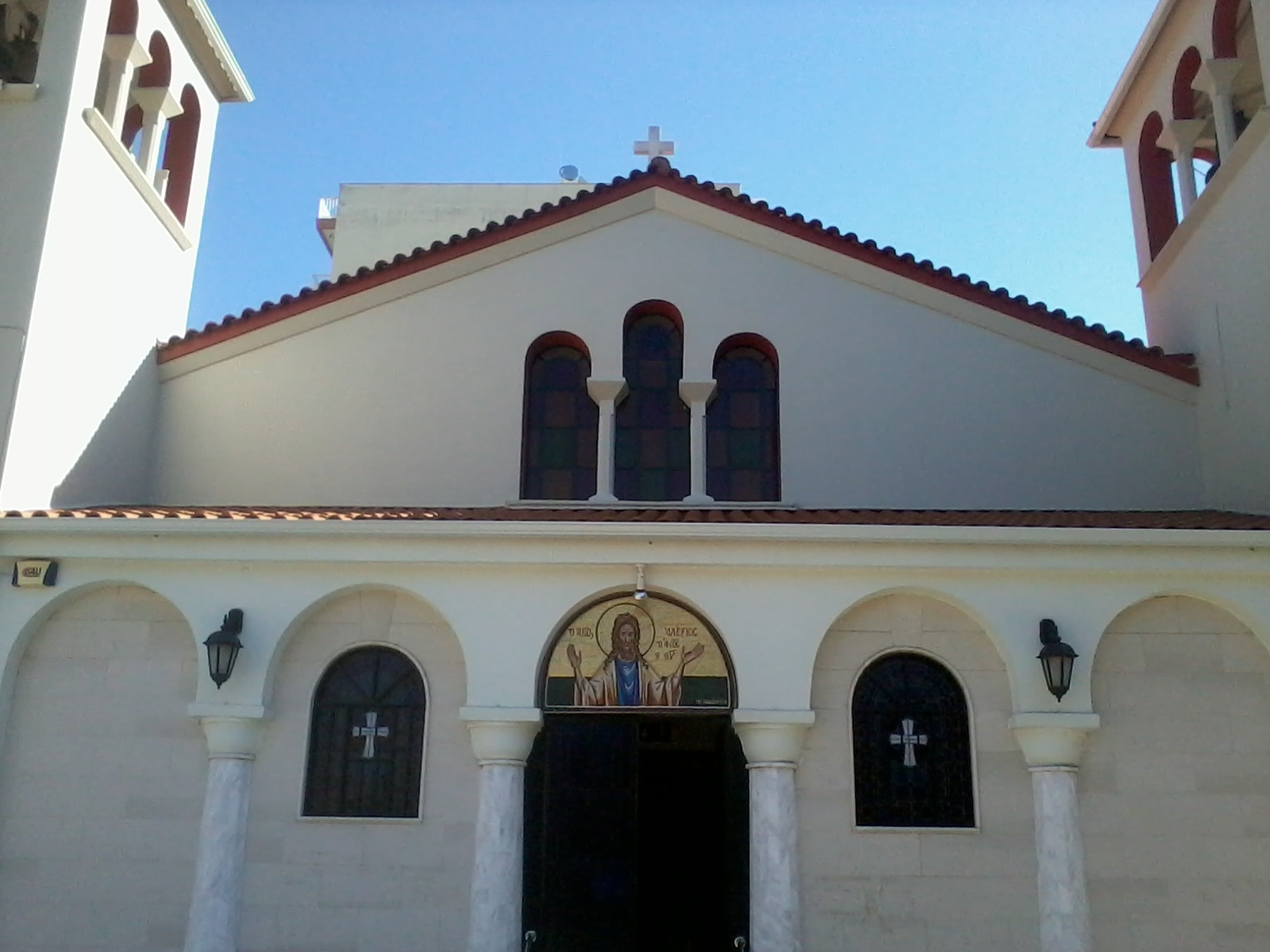
Saint Alexios church in the city of Patras
