= Tsivdi =

Coordinates: 38.24439°N 21.72989°E

Tsivdi (Greek: Τσιβδί, literally meaning "κίβδηλος", "counterfeit") is a neighbourhood in the central part of the city of Patras 1 km southwest of the downtown core. The subdivision is bounded with Dimitriou Gounari Street to the north, the Karaiskaki Street to the east and Trion Navarchon Street to the south.

== Streets ==
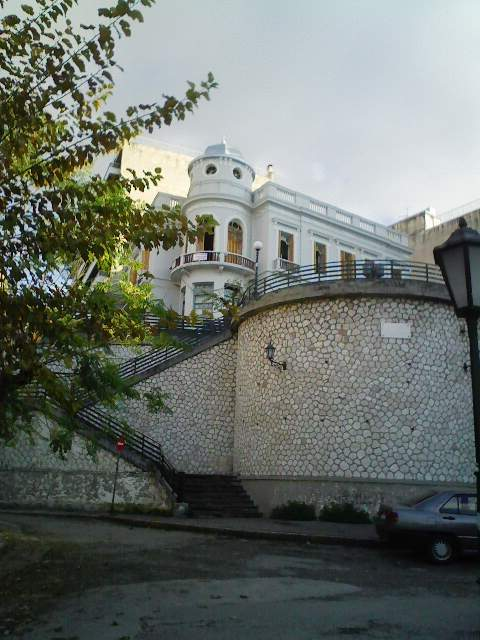
Trion Navarchon Street

- Agiou Andreou Street
- Faraggi Street
- Dimitriou Gounari Street
- Maizonos Street
- Othonos-Amalias Avenue
- Riga Fereou Street
- Sachtouri Street
- Trion Navarchon Street

== Geography ==
The entire area is residential. Its length and width is approximately 1 km and its area is approximately 1 to 2 km^{2}.

== History ==
The area was farmland until the reign of the Roman Emperor Septimius Severus (193-211 AD). Severus constructed the port of the city, which was used until the Venetian rule and by the Venetians. The port was located in the present day area by Gounaris Street up to Trion Navarchon Street 1 km southwest of downtown. At the entrance of the port there were two towers. The depth was around 4 m and is in the today's Ipsila Alonia Square. With the destruction of the city from the Venetians, the area used the port other than the continuation in which that time it had a lot of odour and plague in the city. In 1883, it filled up the earth and drained and it extended the city.

Before the Greek War of Independence and that time was the second Venetian rule, it had a Jewish population. It was one of the largest neighbourhoods. Today it is a quiet subdivision with many neoclassical buildings and shops. All of its residential areas were reconstructed after the revolution. Its streets were numbered and named and later on paved and lamp posts were added.

After World War II and the Greek Civil War, four- to eight-storey buildings were built in the eastern part, but its architecture remains with two to three-storey buildings in the western part. Street lights were modernized, traffic lights were installed.

== Information ==
The Port of Patras is to its west, it also features a square by Agiou Andreou and Gounari Streets.
