= Ladopoulou, Patras =

Neighborhood of Patras, Greece

Ladopoulou (Greek: Λαδόπουλου) is a neighbourhood in the southeastern part of the city of Patras next to the Glafkos river. The origin of the name comes from a paper factory owned by Evangelos Ladopoulos which made paper in the first decade of the 20th century until the 1980s. Today, the building, the largest part was made into a track and field and other buildings were used for several cultural manifestations.
