= Eglykada =

Coordinates: 38°14′N 21°46′E

Eglykada (Greek: Εγλυκάδα, meaning "sweetness") is a neighbourhood in the eastern part of the city of Patras, 7 km by road from the city center. Eglykada is accessed with the Patras-Ekilistra Road which is 2 km long in the neighbourhood. Since 2002, it is linked with the Patras Bypass in which it was first constructed in the late-1990s and the interchange later on. Its interchange is circular with only one access from the entrance lane but it does not have any tolls and the intersection is by the entrance and the merging lanes. It is 200 m south of the road and 500 m from its nearest tunnel.

The origin of the name is a corruption of the name Glykada and it is name since still today are made up of oranges, lemons, etc. The area was entirely rural until the 1960s. It had a sanatorium during the Medieval Times. A cypress tree in the area was burnt down by Turkish forces Turks during the Greek War of Independence of 1821.

== Nearest places ==
- Perivola, south
- Romanos, north
- Souli, east

== Streets ==
- Road linking Patras and Ekilistra

== Geography ==
The hilly setting is filled with agricultural lands and surrounding houses. Sporadic forest cover and several hills lie to the east. The total area is approximately 2 km^{2}, its length is 1 km from north to south, and from east to west. The mountains dominate the northern part. The Panachaiko mountains lies to the east.

== People ==
- Germanos III of Old Patras
