= Kavouri, Patras =

Neighbourhood of the city of Patras, Achaea, Greece

Kavouri (Greek: Καβούρι, meaning "crab") is a neighbourhood in the city of Patras, Achaea, Greece.
