= Agios Dimitrios, Patras =

Agios Dimitrios (Greek: Άγιος Δημήτριος, meaning ""Saint Demetrios") is a neighbourhood in the city of Patras, Achaea, Greece.
