= Antheia, Patras =

Neighbourhood in the city of Patras, Greece

Antheia (Greek: Άνθεια or Ανθεία) is a neighbourhood in the city of Patras, Achaea, Greece.
