= Perivola, Patras =

Neighbourhood in Patras, Greece

Perivola (Greek: Περιβόλα, from περιβόλι, meaning "garden") is a neighbourhood in the east-southeastern part of the city of Patras, 6 km direct and 7 km via road from the downtown core. Perivola is linked with Patron-Klaous Road which is 3 km long. Since 2002, it is linked with the Patras Bypass in which it was first constructed in the late-1990s. Its interchange is approximately 1 km long.

== Nearest subdivisions ==
- Vryseika, west

== Nearest places ==
- Petroto, east
- Glafkos, southeast
- Demenika, southwest

== Streets ==
- Patron-Klaous Road

== Geography ==
Its geography are filled with agricultural lands and with residential houses in the middle. Forests are sporadically founded and several hills lie to the east. Its total area is approximately 2 km^{2}, its length is 1 km from north to south, and from east to west. The entire area are not flat.
