= Chalkomata =

Neighborhood of Patras, Greece

Chalkomata (Greek: Χαλκωματά) is a neighbourhood in the central part of the city of Patras. It is named after the Chalkomatas family in which they arrived in the area in 1688 from Athens. In 1923, it united with the neighbourhood of Gyri or Giri and became a new subdivision under the name Skagiopouleio.

It is called also and Nea Kypros (Greek: Νέα Κύπρος).

== People ==
- Antonios Kalamogdartis, politician
