= Drosia, Patras =

Coordinates: 38.2330°N 21.7450°E

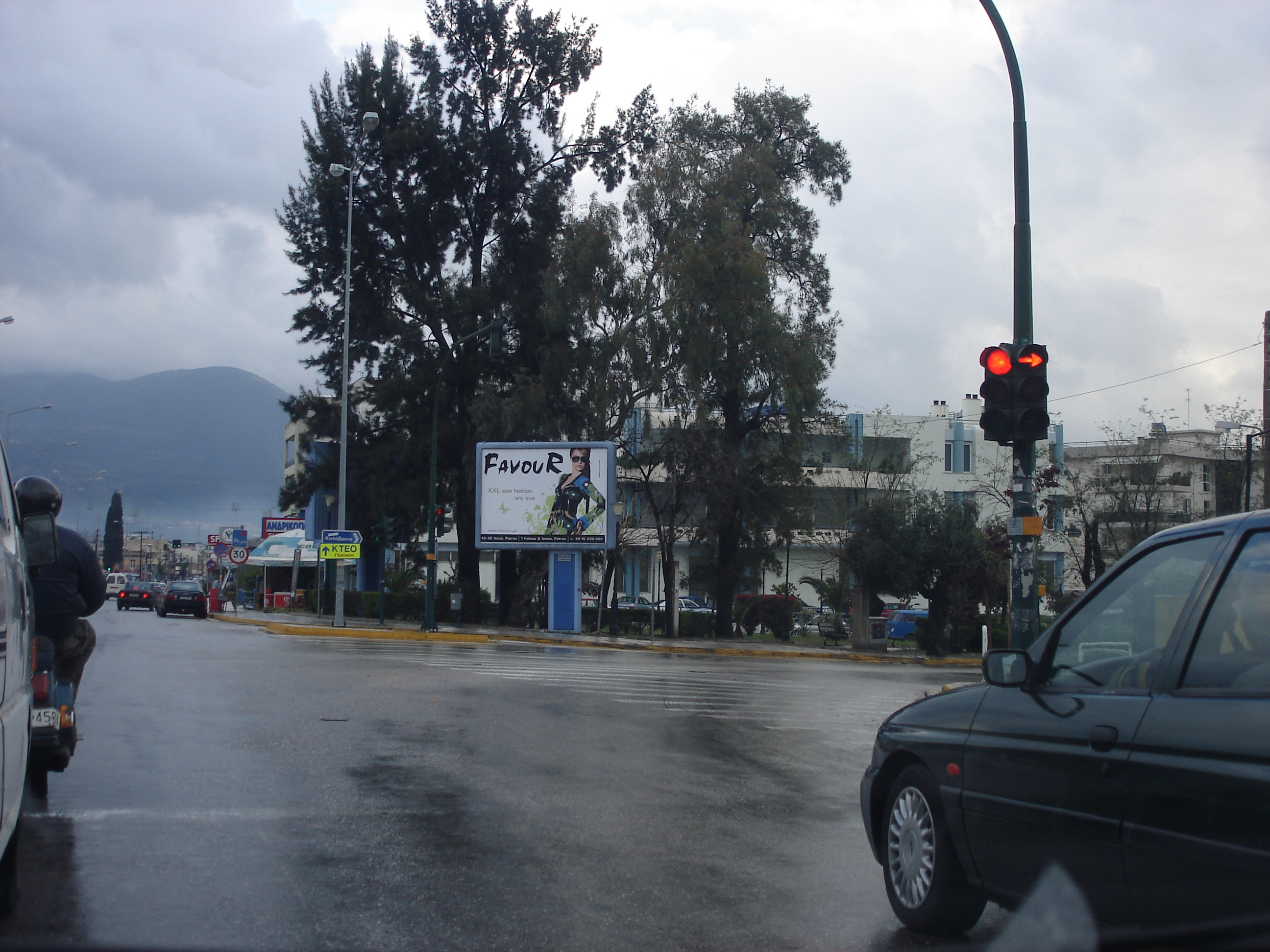
The Drosia district and the square of the same name (or Kalavrytinos Holocaust Square)

Drosia (Greek: Δροσιά, meaning "dew" or "coolness") is a neighbourhood in the city of Patras, Greece, 3 km east-southeast of downtown.

== Streets ==
- Andreou Papandreou Street
- Damaskou Street
- Kalavryton Street
- Patras-Clauss Road

== Information ==
The origin of the name comes from the centre named Drosia which used to exist in the 1970s by Aktotiriou Street and Patras-Clauss Road in which is now a square. In the square named Kalavrytinou Olokaftomatos survives several trees under from the area which had little tables in the centre. The avenue are filled with palm trees in the middle and has a hospital.

The area are residential to the south and west, a forest lies to the southeast, and mountains to the north.
