= Vlatero =

Neighbourhood Patras, Greece

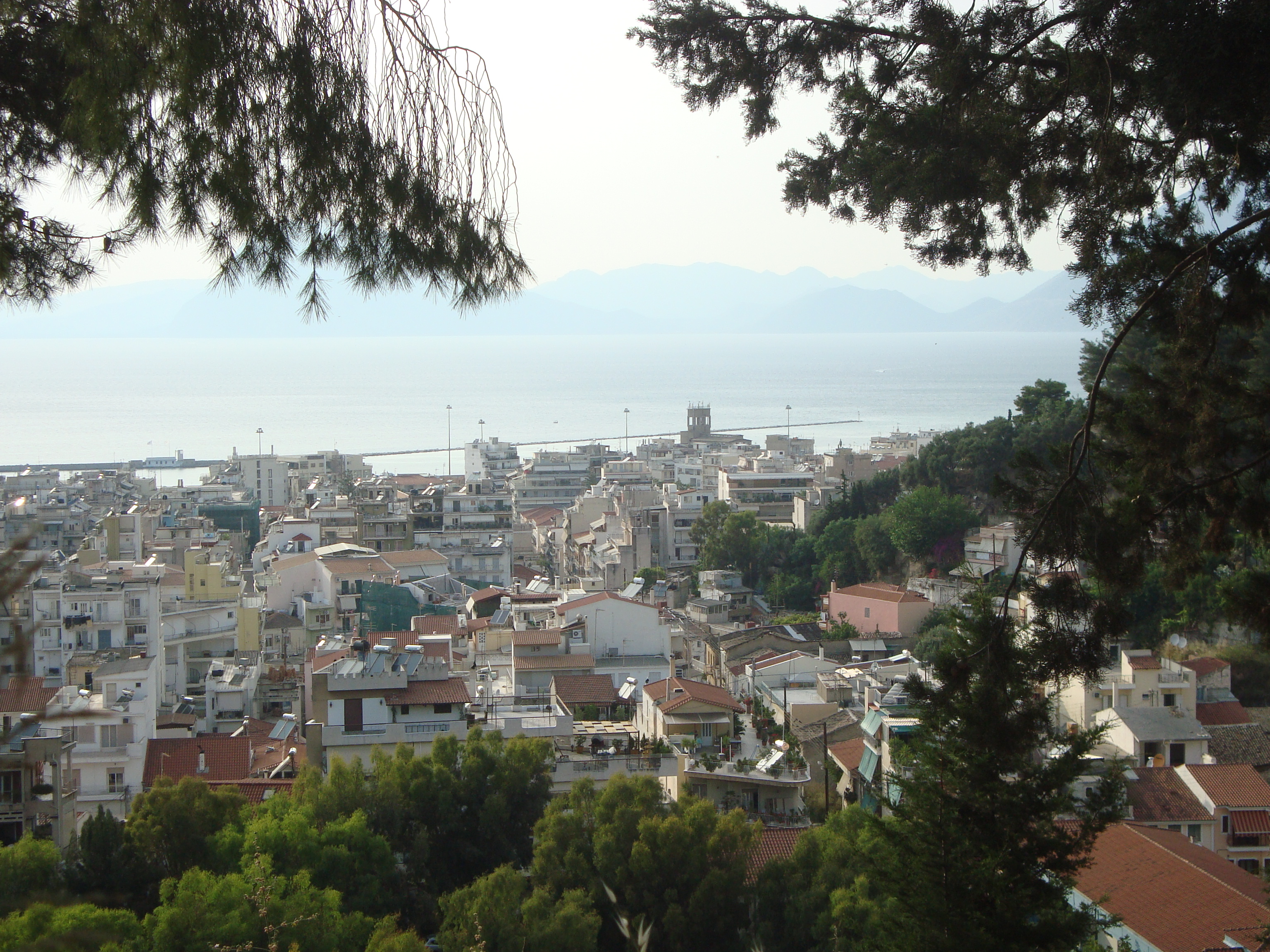
Vlatero District of Patras

Vlatero (Greek: Βλατερό) is a neighbourhood in the central part of the city of Patras, Greece.

It is the oldest area in lower Patras. The origin of the name comes from the Latin word blattea which means purple and from that came from the red dye in which it used for silk and fabric which were used for the king and the rich people. In the area it had that handicraft during the Byzantine period and it belong to the lady Danielis.
