= Gouva, Patras =

Gouva (Greek: Γούβα, meaning "puddle") is a neighbourhood in the northeastern part of the city of Patras, 4 km direct and 5 km via road from the downtown core. Gouva is linked with a mountain road and with Amerikis Street. The EO8a road and the E55 (Athens - Corinth - Patras) as well as the EO5/E55 (Antirrio - Agrinio - Ioannina) and the EO48/E65 (Patras - Antirrio - Nafpaktos - Livadia) as well as Panepistimiou Street.

== Nearest places ==
- Skioessa, north

== Streets ==
- Little Patras Perimeter Road - a bypass not connected with another highway

== Geography ==
Farmlands still dominate the area especially the valley areas. Residential areas and buildings are in the valley areas. The forests covers the remainder of the area as well as grasslands, especially on hilltops and mountaintops. The farmlands are to the extreme northern and the southern part, and are now in small numbers, residential covers the remainder of the area and the supermarkets and several factories to the west. Its total area is approximately 5 to 6 km^{2} and 2 km in length from west to east and 2 km in width from north to south. Its total street length is approximately 15 to 20 km of which 4 km are main streets, the rest are residential.

== History ==
The housing developments of Patras arrived in the mid to late 20th century and boomed rapidly until the 1990s. Before, it was a rural neighbourhood and was based in agriculture, it is still dominant with a smaller percentage.
