= Kotroni =

Kotroni Κοτρώνι
- Neighbourhood
- Location within Greece
- Coordinates: 38°16′17.4″N 21°45′37.6″E
- Country: Greece
- Region: Western Greece
- City: Patras

Area
  - Total: 0.55 km^{2} (0.21 sq mi)
- Elevation: 47 m (154 ft)
- Time zone: UTC+1 (Eastern European Time)
  - Summer (DST): UTC+2 (Eastern European Summer Time)

Kotroni (Greek: Κοτρώνι) is a neighbourhood in the city of Patras, Achaea, Greece.

In ancient times, the city of Pefnos was located about five miles seawards west of the settlement.
