= Markato =

Neighborhood in Patras

Markato (Greek: Μαρκάτο, meaning "market") is a neighbourhood in the central part of the city of Patras, Greece. The origin of the name comes from the Italian word mercato which means market in which the Venetians arrived in 1699 and built a public market. Later, the Ottoman Turks reconquered the area and remained until the Greek War of Independence. The Turks destroyed the market, but the name is still in use today; the area today is known as the centre of the city's market.

== Places ==
- Ermou Street
- Kapodistria Square
