= Asyrmatos, Patras =

Neighbourhood in Patras, Achaea, Greece

Coordinates: 38°14′53″N 21°44′55″E

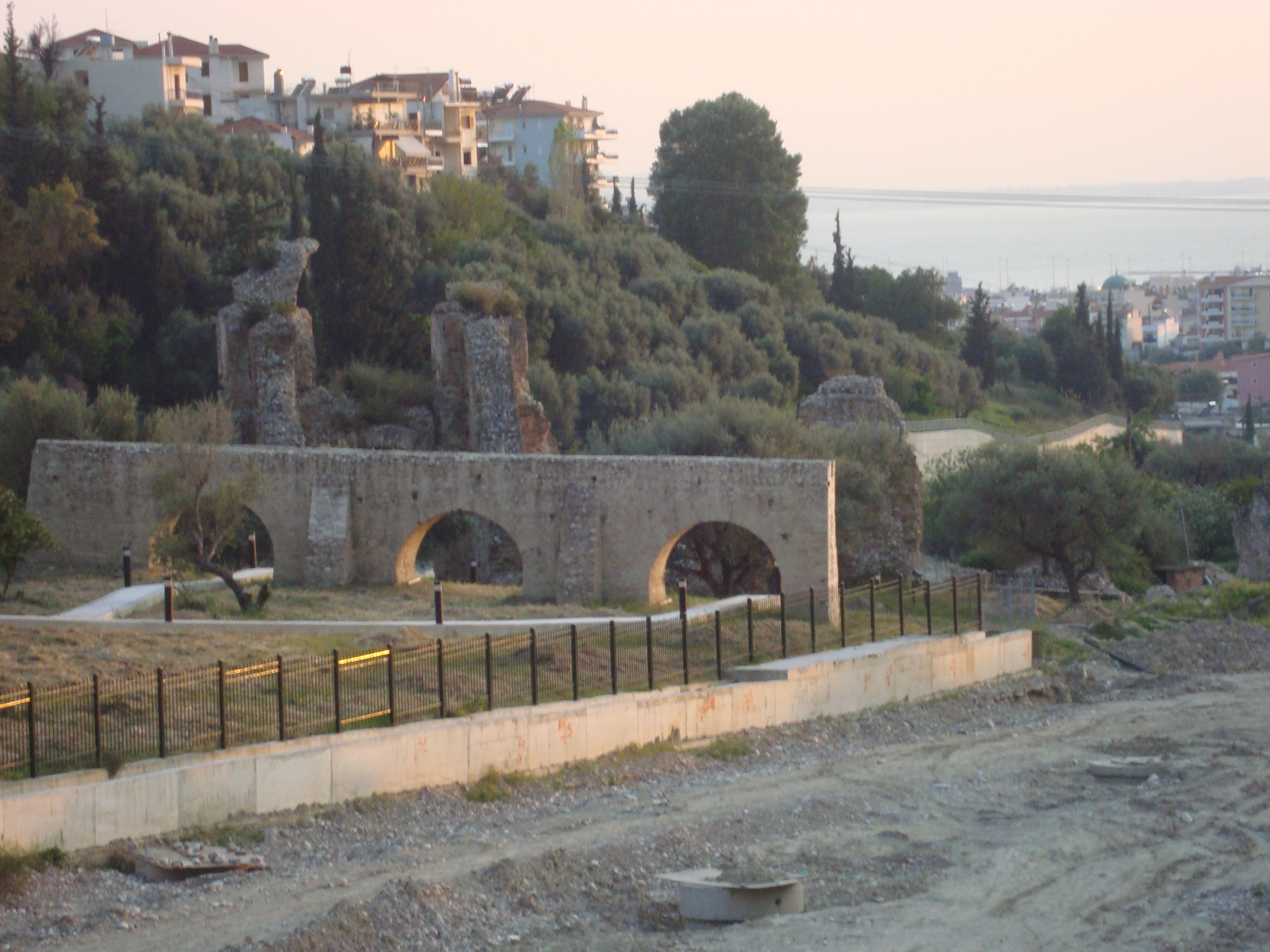
Part of the Roman Aqueduct of Patras in Asyrmatos

Asyrmatos (Greek: Ασύρματος, meaning "wireless device") is a neighbourhood in the city of Patras, Achaea, Greece.
