= Ampelokipoi, Patras =

Neighborhood of Patras, Greece

Coordinates: 38.2662°N 21.7613°E

Ampelokipoi (Greek: Αμπελόκηποι, meaning "vineyards") is a neighbourhood in the city of Patras, Achaea, Greece.
