= Begoulaki =

Coordinates: 38°13′N 21°45′E

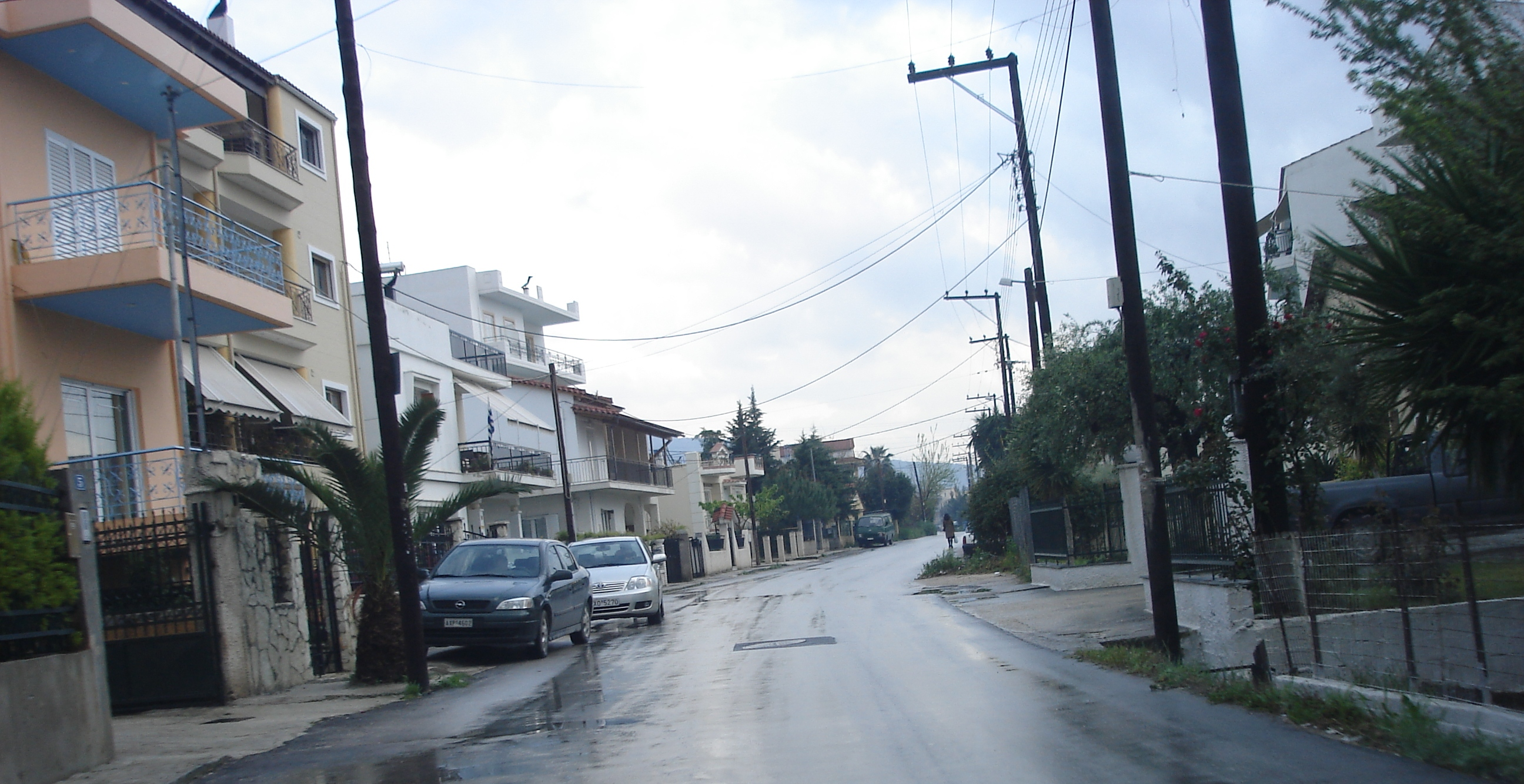
A street

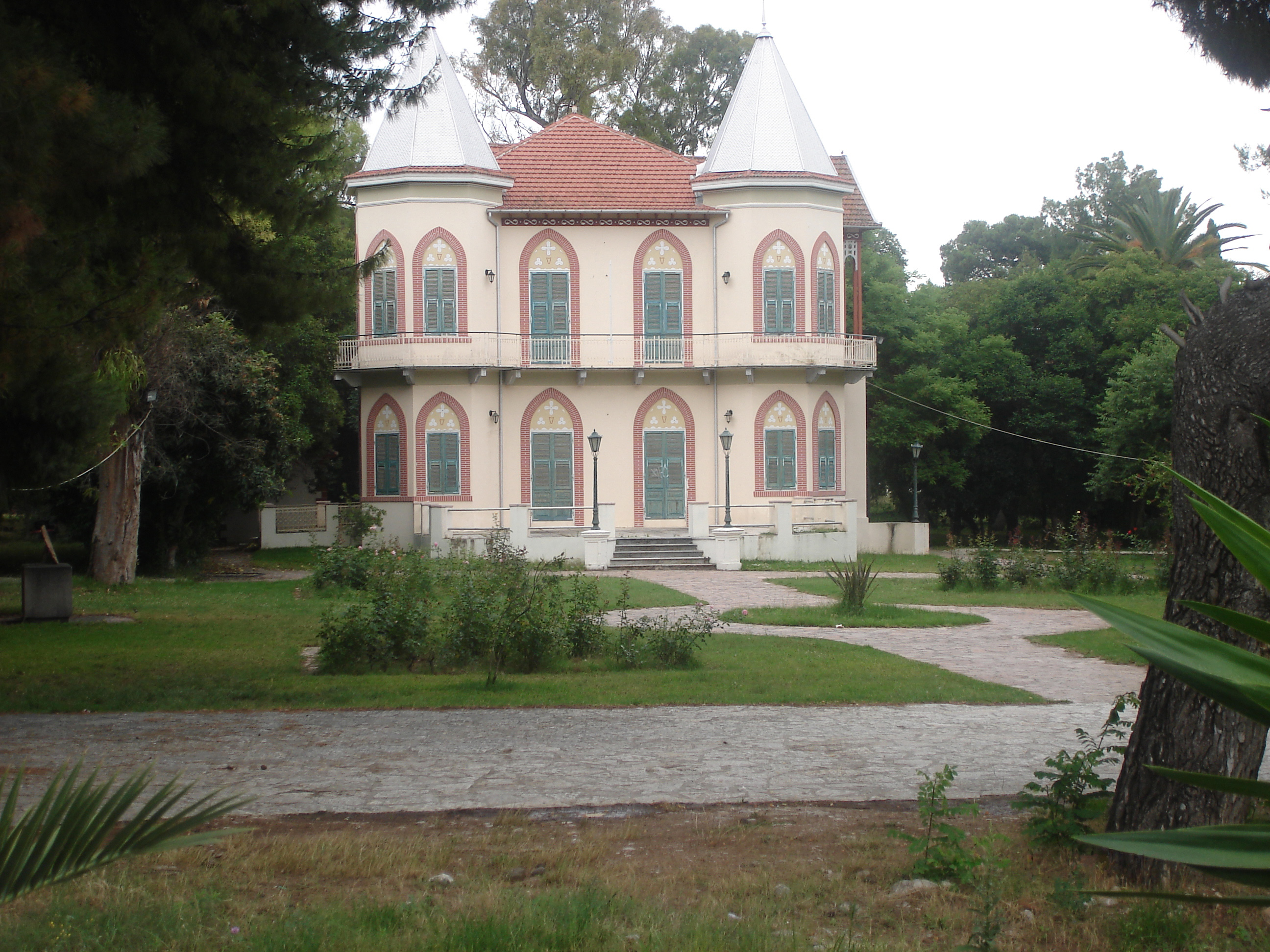
Villa Kolla

Begoulaki (Greek: Μπεγουλάκι) is the popular name of a neighbourhood in the city of Patras. The name is originally derived from Bey Ulak, a Turkish landlord who lived in the area during the Ottoman period. Today, the official name is Myloi (Μύλοι) even though other people kept the toponym Begoulaki. The current neighborhood was named "Myloi" before the Ottoman era, but the Byzantine chronographer G. Frantzis referred to it as "Mylous". The area was made into a military base by Constantine XI Paleologus during his siege of Patras as the despot of Mystras. It was also the place where Constantine married his first wife.

Shortly after the Greek Revolution, the area had many mills from which it received its name. The Roufos family lived in the area, as well as members from the Kollas clan.
