= Dasylio, Patras =

Coordinates: 38.249°N 21.746°E

Dasylio (Greek: Δασύλιο, meaning "small forest") is a neighbourhood in the city of Patras, Achaea, Greece.
