= Agia Aikaterini, Patras =

Coordinates: 38°12′N 21°42′E

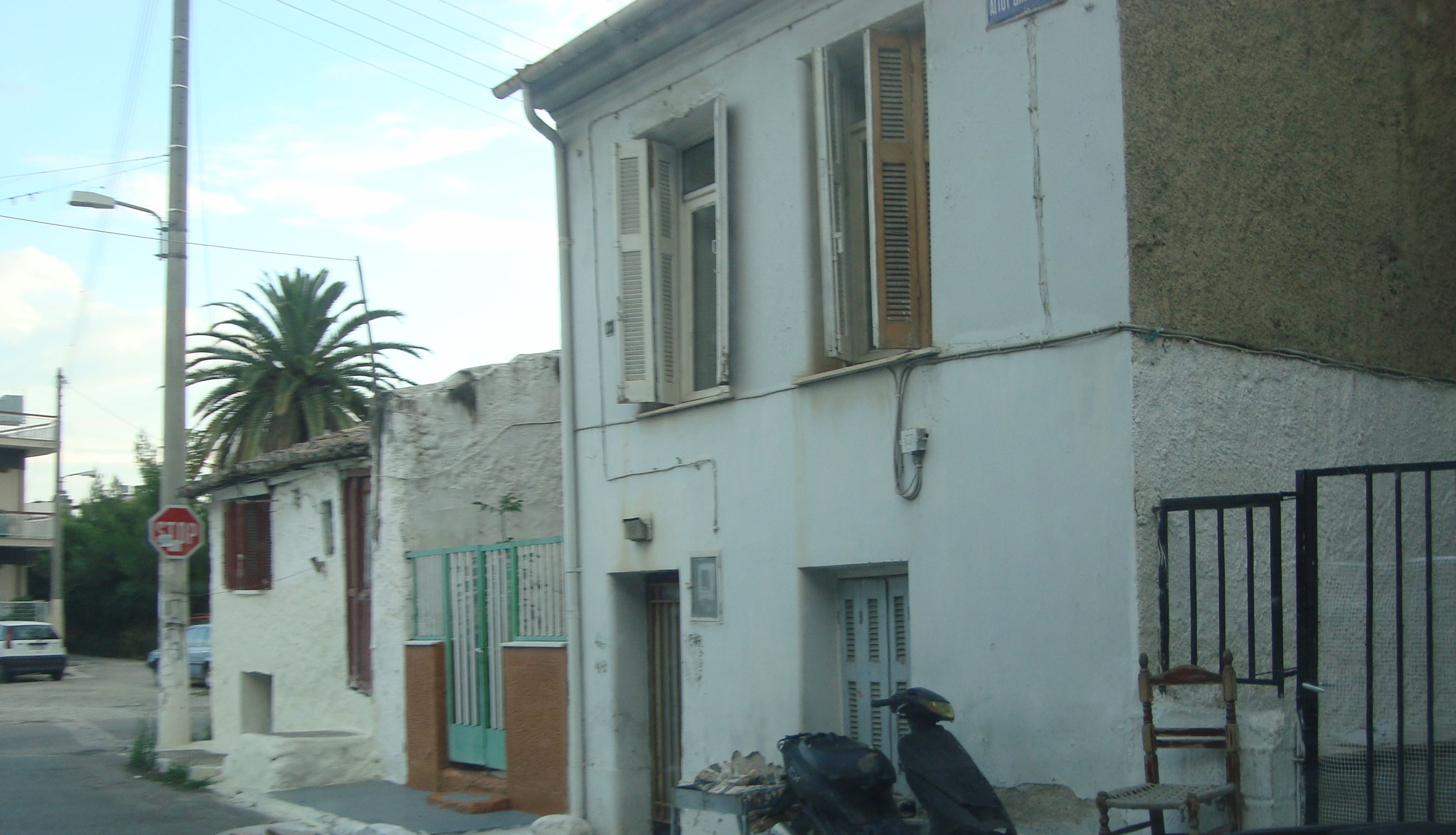
Old buildings

Agia Aikaterini (Greek: Αγία Αικατερίνη, meaning Saint Catherine), or alternative Gyftika (Greek: Γύφτικα, meaning "area of gypsies"), is a neighbourhood in the east-central part of the city of Patras, located 2 km from the downtown core.

The origin of the name comes from the time of Venetian occupation of Patras. At that time, the Venetians forced the Romá of the town to settle in that area.

The main occupation of the inhabitants used to be iron production. Traditionally the community elects its leader (not always a Roma), also known as captain. Until a few decades ago, it was one of the poorest and least safe areas of Patras. Today, it is one of the most quiet neighborhoods next to the city centre and its inhabitants ensure that the original architecture of the neighborhood is preserved.
