= Kritika, Patras =

Neighbourhood of Patras in Achaea, Greece

Kritika (Greek: Κρητικά, meaning "area of Cretans") is a neighbourhood in the city of Patras, Achaea, Greece.
