= Agios Dionyssios, Patras =

Coordinates: 38°15′N 21°44′E

Agios Dionysios (Greek: Άγιος Διονύσιος, meaning "Saint Dionysius") is a neighbourhood in the city of Patras, Greece. Its boundaries are the street north of Agiou Dionyssiou, Riga Faireou Street to the east and 28 Octovriou Street to the south.

== Geography ==
Much of the area are made up of residences. The square is by Agiou Andreou and Norman Streets. The Patras Freight Yard is to the northwest and the Port of Patras is to the west.

== History ==
Until 1828 when the city was liberated by the Ottoman Empire, the area held farmlands, vineyards and olive groves. A large part of the land belonged to Ioannis Papadiamantopoulos. In 1829, many Zanteans settled in the area and built the church of Saint Dionysius.

Houses and buildings were added and in the late-19th and the early-20th centuries.

After World War II and the Greek Civil War, the eastern and the northernmost portions of the subdivision received taller buildings, reaching eight stories, amidst buildings with neo-classical architecture. In the 1960s and the 1970s, the Port of Patras expanded with more piers and an entrance in which is moved north of Agios Dionyssios.

== People ==
- Ioannis Papadiamantopoulos (elder)
