= Proastio, Patras =

Neighbourhood in Patras, Greece

Coordinates: 38.2802°N 21.7694°E

Proastio (Greek: Προάστιο or Προάστειο, meaning "suburb"; before 1928 it was named Bozaitika, Μποζαΐτικα in Greek) is a neighbourhood in the northern part of the city of Patras, 6 km from the city centre. The Greek National Road 8 (Corinth - Patras) and the OSE Corinth - Patras railway line pass through the neighbourhood. The river Charadros flows 1 km north. The municipal boundary with Rio is also to the north.

== Geography ==
The farmlands are to the central part, residential homes are by the Ionian Sea and by the new highway to the east. Its total area is approximately 7 to 8 km^{2} and 2 km in length from west to east and 3 to 3.5 km in width from north to south. Its total street length is approximately 10 km of which 3 km are main streets, the rest are residential.

== History ==
Proastio was entirely rural and had settlements and rural houses. Forests dominated the western part, by the river and in mixed areas. The areas compromised with olive groves and pastures as well as fruits, vegetables and other crops including tomatoes, potatoes, cucumbers, onions, watermelons, melons and others. In the late-1960s, the EO8a road (Athens–Corinth–Patras) was under construction and opened to traffic in 1969. Housing developments arrived in the 1970s and the 1980s and it generated a large population growth that were building by the coast and by the highway. Shops were added in large numbers.
