= Glaraki =

Neighborhood of Patras, Greece

Glaraki (Greek: Γλαράκη) is a district in the city of Patras, Greece. The area is located at the end of Germanos Street. Today, it features a complex of elementary schools. The origin of the name comes from the minister (1832) of the Achaea prefecture, Georgios Glarakis.Τhε Glaraki District is one of the oldest in Patras in the Upper Town, bordering the Aroi, Critika, Sinora, St. Demetrius and Marouda.

== "Georgios Glarakis" school complex ==
The "George Glarakis" school complex

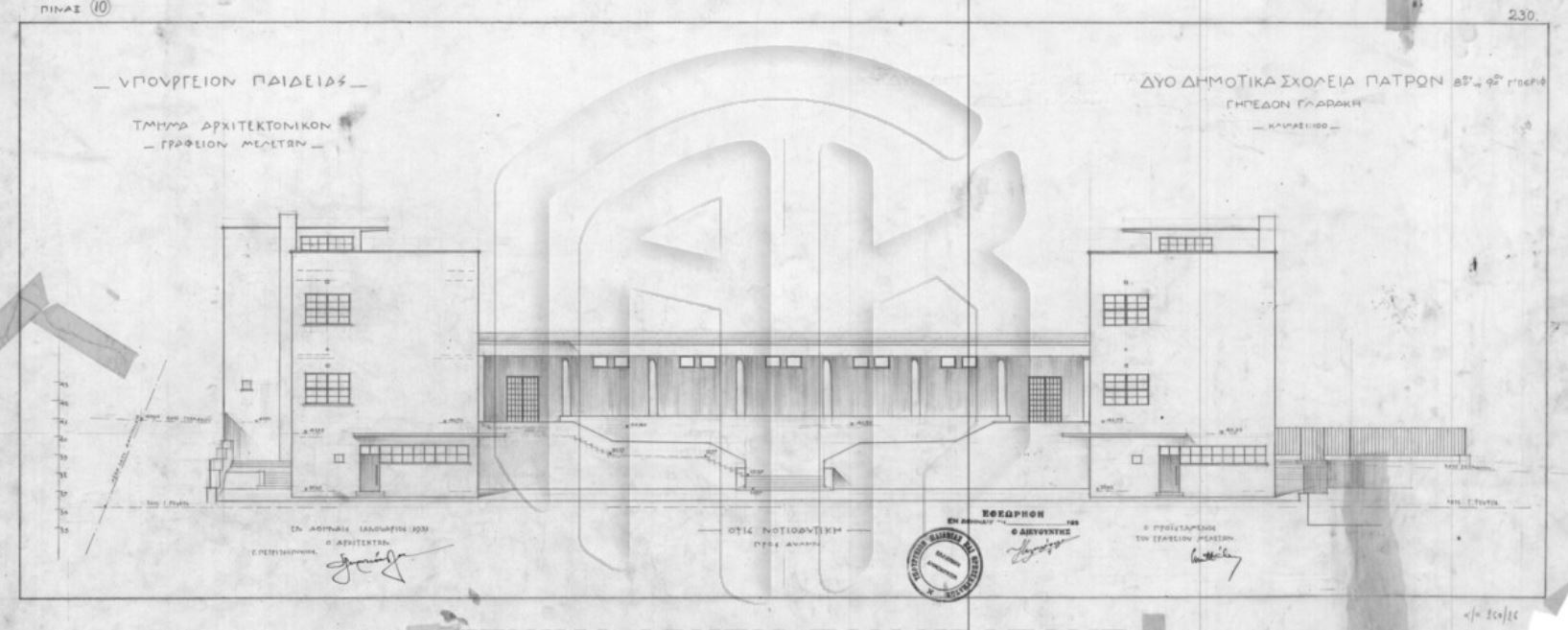
Glarakis George School Complex 1931

is located in the Upper Town at the terminus of Old Patron Germanou Street (No. 184)

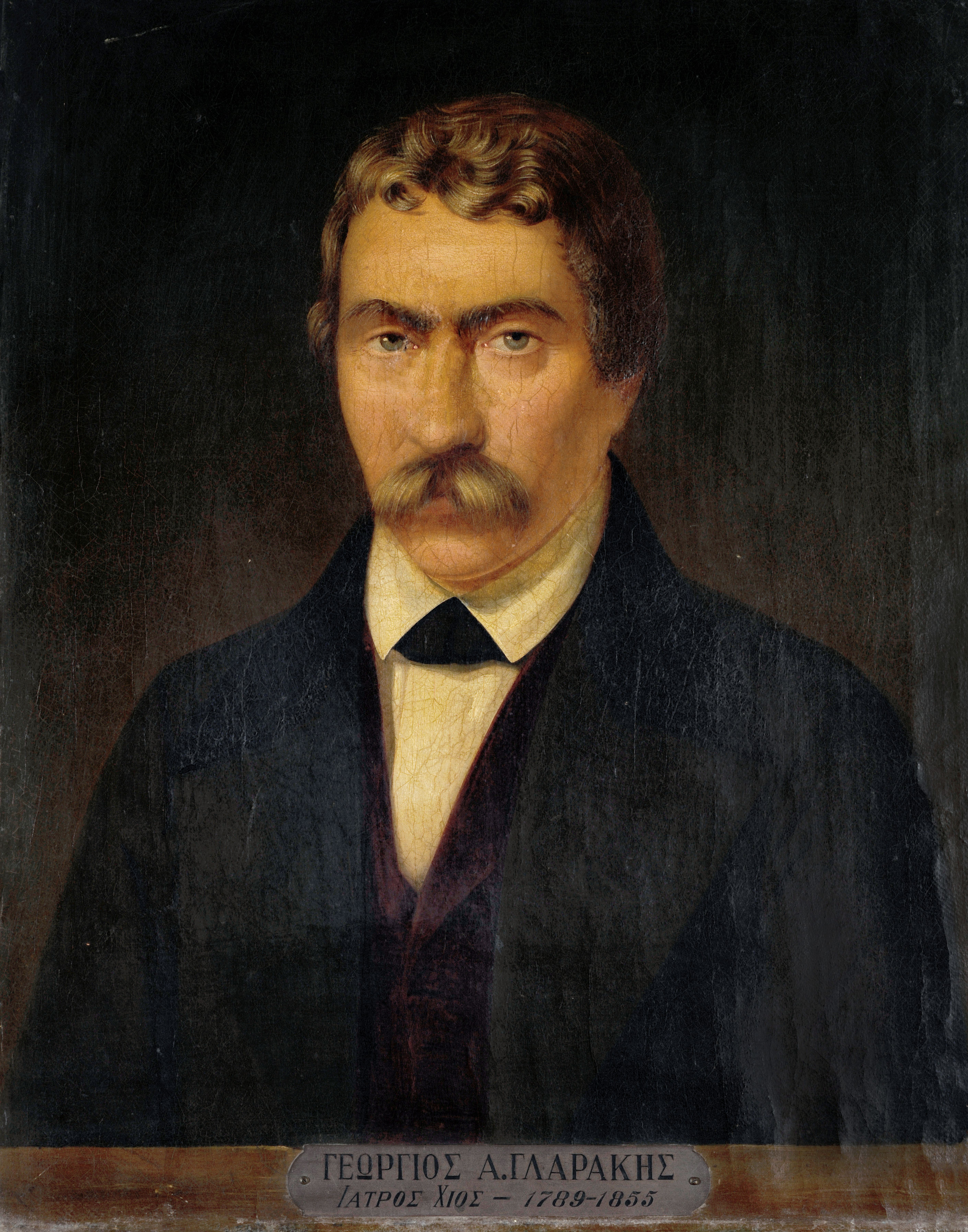
Glarakis George (1789–1855)

In the Tampachana area - also called Glaraki district. It was built on a site where formerly the George Glarakis Estate was donated by the Glarakis family to build a primary School, since there was a shortage of primary schools in the then developing area, and for this reason the School was associated with the name of the George Glarakis.

The history of the Glarakis School Complex began in 1930 with the headteacher of the 3 / th mixed 8th Primary School of Patras Dimitrios Tzouras and the headteacher of the 6 / th mixed 9th Primary School of Patras Athanasios Tzililis (first name of the School Complex "8th and 9th Primary Schools of Patras 1930 »).The school building is surrounded by Paleon Patron Germanou,3rd Oribatikou, Georgiou Roufou and Daniilidos Streets.

The architectural drawings of the 8th and 9th primary schools are signed in 1931 by the architect of the Ministry of Education's Research Office George I. Petritsopoulos with the note: "for the construction on the Glarakis stadium of two primary schools of the Patras 8th and 9th Archives [ with the mark: [2 Primary School of Patras. "Glaraki" (8th and 9th c. 1930–1931). In 2022, the energy upgrade and autonomy of the Glarakis school complex will be completed with an NSRF program of 1,100,000 euros provided by the Region of Western Greece and implemented by the Municipality of Patras

The oldest living student of the Glaraki School Complex, Panagiota Roggi, 93 years old, who graduated in 1938 from the 9th Primary School, describes the year 2021: "Our school, the 9th Primary School, was a new, well-built, solid building, bright, with beautiful mosaics in the corridors and marble on the stairs. It had 7 teachers (6 teachers and 1 principal who also taught the F class; they were strict but they loved us), with 30 or more students per classroom, with 1 janitor-cleaner. It was without heating (in winter our feet were shivering), without a canteen (for 2 pennies you could buy -whoever had- 1 pretzel from a hawker with a bag that came to the bars). There was sand in the yard, in which we played chase (no balls). The building was as it is today, having the same yard as the 8th grade across the street-which they got along with very well " In 2022, the energy upgrade and autonomy of the Glaraki School Complex will be completed with an NSRF program of 1.100.000 euros secured by the Region of Western Greece and implemented by the Municipality of Patra.

== Georgios Glarakis ==
George Glarakis (1789–1855) Greek, scholar, doctor, philosopher, politician 1789 - Chios 1814-1817- Studies at the University of Göttingen, Germany - Dr. of Medicine 1817-1820 - Doctor in Vienna. 1820 - returns to Greece 1821- 1823 participates in the Greek Revolution against the Turks He collaborates with Th. Kolokotronis. 1823-1826 – Minister of the Interior Affairs 1827- 1831 -Minister of Foreign Affairs- State-Navy 1832-1835- Prefect of Achaia-Ilia prefectures 1837-1838-Minister of Education - he contributes to the founding of the University of Athens- 1838 - With his proposal, it is established the annual celebration of the anniversary of 1821 on March 25 1847-Minister of the Interior Affairs 1846-1855-President of the Archaeological Society 1913- A section of the Glaraki Estate is granted to become the 2nd terminal of the tram (current contribution of Paleon Patron Germanou-3rd Orivatikou streets) 1931- The Glaraki Plot is granted to build the 8th - 9th primary schools of Patras.
