= Taraboura =

Neighbourhood in Patras, Greece

Taraboura (Greek: Ταραμπούρα) is a neighbourhood in the city of Patras. It is named after one of the Albanians in which he lived and had his house in his area. Until 1990, it had a tall for the entrance and exit for carriage wheels and vehicles in Patras. Residential housing arrived in 1980.

Taraboura features a closed arena where Olympiada Patras plays. It is located at 24 Tisonas Street with the postcode 26623. Its capacity is 2,500 people.
