= Danielis =

Byzantine noble

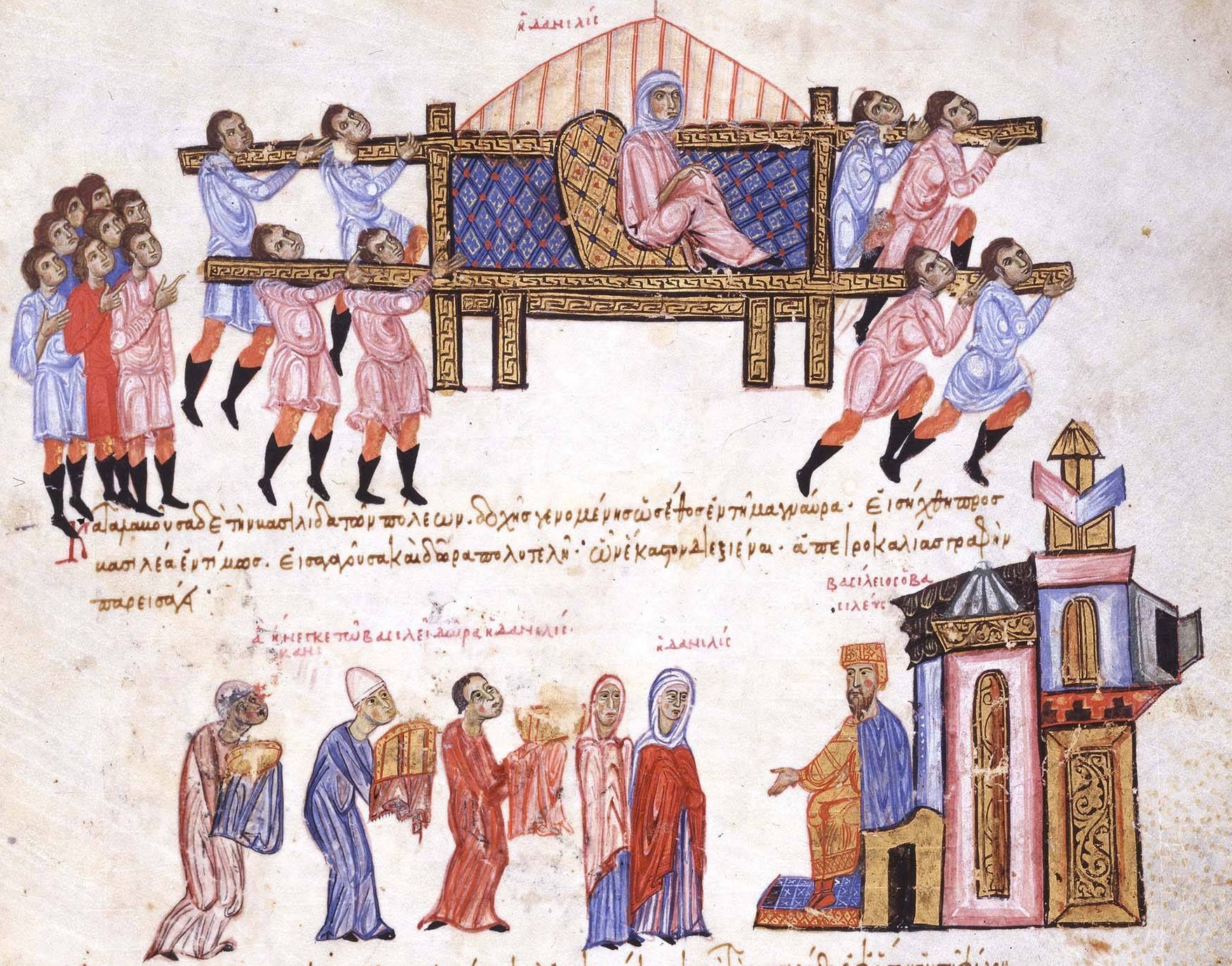
Danielis being carried by her slaves to Constantinople. Miniature from the chronicle of Ioannis Skylitzes, mid-13th century. Madrid Biblioteca Nacional

Danielis (Greek: Δανιηλίς, Daniēlís, fl. 9th century AD) was a widowed Byzantine noblewoman landowner from Patras.

== Traditional narrative ==
According to the written tradition (continuing in the tradition of Theophanes) she was an extremely wealthy landowner, owning a significant part of the Peloponnese, as well as a flourishing carpet and textile industry. However, Ilias Anagnostakis has argued that the narrative about Danielis is not merely exaggerated but largely fictional. Her relationship with Basil I was modeled on that between King Solomon and the queen of Sheba on the one hand, and Alexander the Great's visit to Kandake (as related in the Alexander Romance) on the other. The invention was meant, along with the other miraculous tales told about Basil in that text, to base his legitimacy and heroic stature in the realm of romantic fable and Scriptural parallel (he was also said to be descended from Alexander and sought to rival Solomon as a builder). Her estate, which she eventually bequeathed to the Emperor Leo VI, an estate ‘exceeding any private fortune and barely inferior to that of a ruler’, included 80 domains and over 3000 slaves whom the emperor sent as colonists to southern Italy.

Danielis became acquainted with the future emperor Basil I the Macedonian during a visit he made in Patras when he was still an attendant of an imperial delegate. For some reason or other, Danielis offered Basil lavish gifts and land property which proved useful in his subsequent ascent to the imperial throne. She also travelled to Constantinople with a large retinue, in order to visit Basil after he became emperor, in what the chronicles describe as an extravagant journey. Her loyalty to the throne was rewarded with the title of Emperor's Mother (Basileomētōr). She outlived Basil I and named Basil's son Leo VI the Wise as her heir. Leo released 3,000 of her slaves and sent them to settle in Southern Italy.

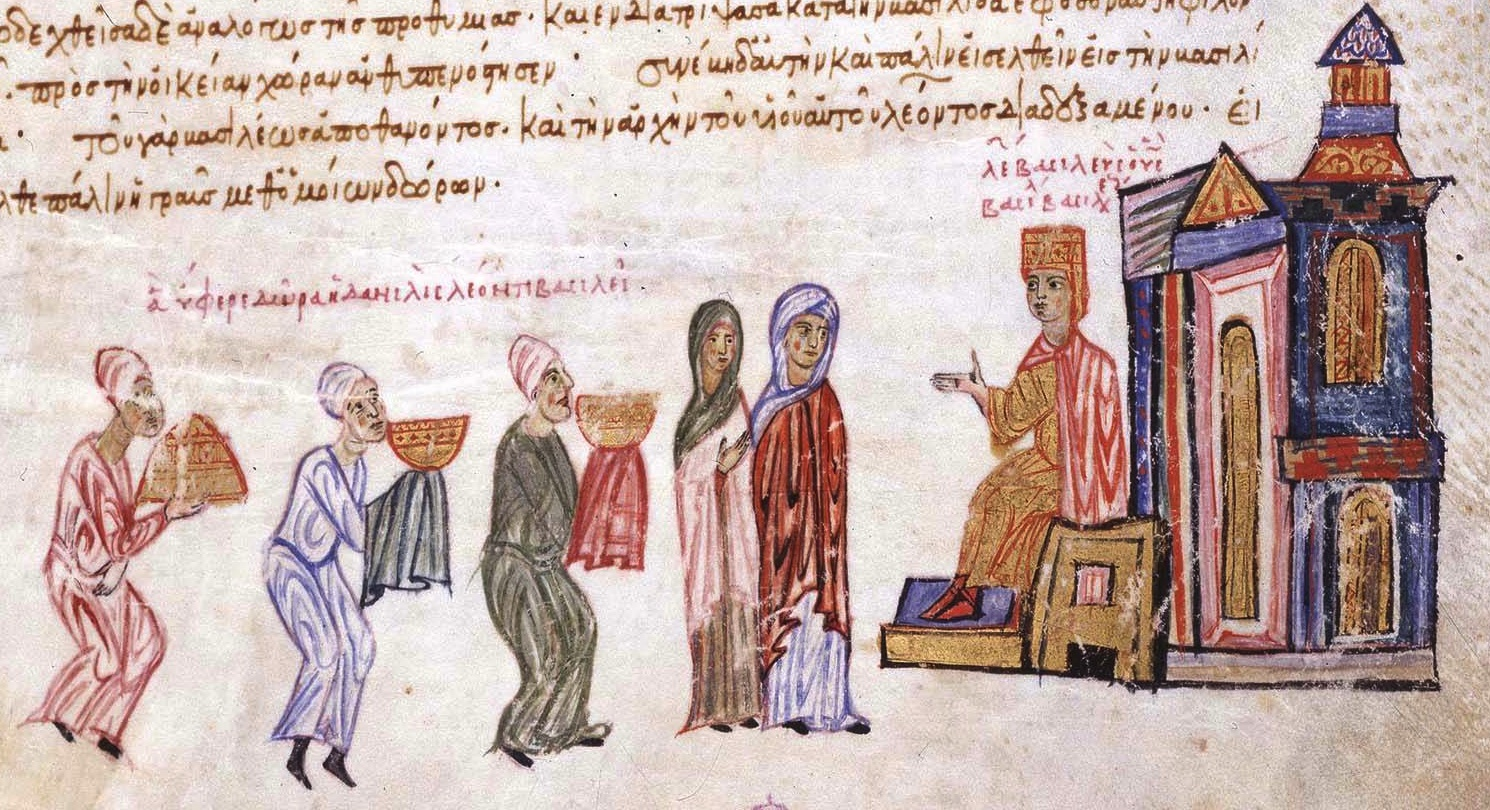
The widow Danielis visits emperor Leo VI.
