= Prosfygika, Patras =

Neighbourhood in Patras, Greece

Prosfygika (Greek: Προσφυγικά, meaning "refugee settlement") is a neighbourhood in the southern Greek city of Patras. It was founded in 1922 as displaced persons from Asia Minor arrived in the city after the 1919–1922 Greco-Turkish War and the subsequent population exchange between Greece and Turkey.

It is estimated that approximately 6-7,000 refugees came to Patra in 1922. In the beginning, they were settled in buildings such as schools, warehouses etc. In 1926 construction began on the first refugee settlements in an area belonging to the families Roufou and Hereti that at the time consisted of reed wetland. The first homes built were spacious and comfortable, however subsequent waves of constructions were of smaller homes, consisting of two rooms, with a communal yard for each block.

The refugees took up all kinds of work, men often running small businesses such as selling ice or firewood, or being employed at woodworks or raisin processing factories; women worked in textile and fabric factories. Many refugees were housed in makeshift accommodation at the factories where they worked, provided by their employers.

For many years, the settlement experienced significant poverty. A community-owned coffin was returned to the parish after each use. The settlement has a largely poor population to date, however the refugees kept a rich heritage of customs and traditions. The church of Agia Fotini was built by the settlers from Asia Minor in honour of the church of Agia Fotini which was in Smyrna. The coffee houses of the settlement, notably Byzantion and Aigli, frequented by groups of men, were the centres of the community.

In 1925 the settlement had several football clubs founded by the refugees, Olympiakos Patras, Thyella, Aris Patras, Apollon, AEK Patras and Patraikos, which were considered legendary within the refugee community and the wider town of Patra. In 1925, construction began on a football arena for Olympiakos, today known as Prosfygika Stadium, next to the church of Agia Fotini, which was inaugurated in 1927 with a match between Olympiakos Patras and Olympiakos Piraeus. It was initially shielded by reeds, and subsequently a makeshift fence was installed, and in 2002 this was replaced by a wire fence. The arena was renovated in 2008 but fell into, and remains, in disuse. It is considered one of the oldest football arenas in Greece, along with the arena Tassakoppoulou and the arena of Panahaiki.

Since its development, the historic neighborhood has undergone gentrification, becoming a desirable place for visitors. In 2025, the mayor of Patras discussed further plans for redevelopment of the area, to make the neighborhood more livable for residents.
