= Koukouli, Patras =

Neighborhood of Patras, Greece

Coordinates: 38.218381°N 21.75179°E

Koukouli (Greek: Κουκούλι, meaning "cocoon") is a neighbourhood in the city of Patras, Achaea, Greece.
