= Aroi, Patras =

Neighborhood in Patras, Greece

Coordinates: 38°15′N 21°45′E

View of the Aroi area from Asyrmatos.

Aroi (Greek: Αρόη, also Aroe) is a neighbourhood in the city of Patras, Achaea, Greece. It is built in a hilly area about 2 miles (3.2 km) inland, near the ancient acropolis, which is known as the Castle of Aroi.

Aroi in ancient Greek means "fertile land". The district is one of the most populous in the area.
