= Neo Souli, Achaea =

Neo Souli Νέο Σούλι
- Community
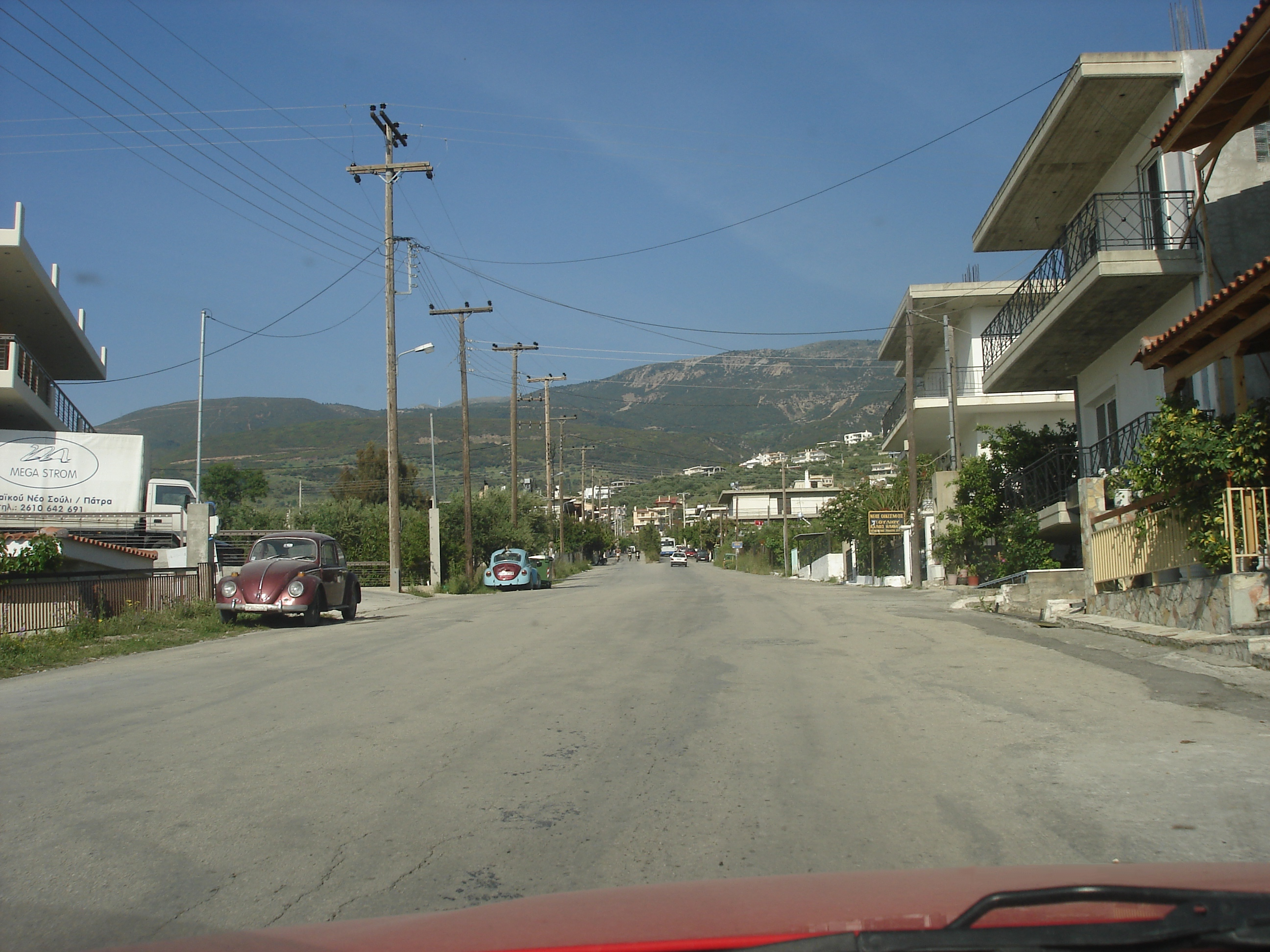

- Location within Greece
- Coordinates: 38°13′N 21°47′E
- Country: Greece
- Administrative region: West Greece
- Regional unit: Achaea
- Municipality: Patras
- Municipal unit: Patras

Population (2021)
  - Community: 1,090
- Time zone: UTC+2 (EET)
  - Summer (DST): UTC+3 (EEST)

Neo Souli (Greek: Νέο Σούλι) is a village in the municipality of Patras, Achaea, Greece. It is the main village of the community Souli, which consists of the villages Neo Souli, Agios Ioannis, Kefalovryso, Mintzaiika, Panagia and Profitis Ilias. Souli was part of the municipality of Patras between 1841 and 1912, and again after 1997. Between 1912 and 1997, it was an independent community.

== Geography ==
Neo Souli is located in the plains, 5 km southeast of the city centre of Patras, just outside the beltway. The Panachaiko mountains lie to the east. It is located between two rivers, the Glafkos and the Diakoniaris, both flowing from the Panachaiko.

== Folk dance festival ==
Neo Souli is known for its folk dance festival (Φεστιβάλ Λαϊκού Χορού), which has been held annually since 1993 in the last weekend of July. Dance groups from all over Greece perform at the festival.

== Population ==
Year	Population village	Community population
1981	606	-
1991	628	-
2001	655	875
2011	756	847
2021	1,048	1,090

== See also ==
- List of settlements in Achaea
