= Psilalonia =

Neighborhood of Patras, Greece

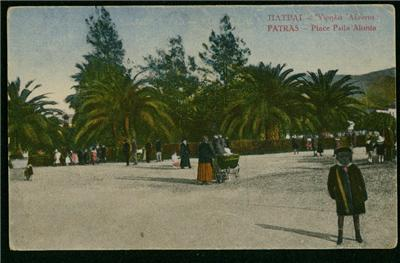
Psilalonia in the early 20th century

Psilalonia (Greek: Ψηλαλώνια, literally "ψηλά αλώνια", meaning "high threshing floors") is a square and neighbourhood in the central part of the city of Patras, approximately 1 km away from the downtown city center. Psilalonia is confined by Gounaris Street and two other squares, 'Omonoia' and 'Wood Square'.

Psilalonia is one of the city's most visited and bustling places, with the homonymous square linking people from all ages and walks of life. It features palm trees, a playground, a fountain, as well as a monument of Germanos III of Old Patras sculpted by Ioannis Kossos, as well as several restaurants.

== Geography ==
The area is densely populated with numerous blocks of flats on the narrow nearby roads. Supermarkets, pastry shops, and bakeries can easily be found all over the neighbourhood. Its total area covers approximately 5 to 6 km², while the total street length is approximately 30 to 40 km, of which 6 to 8 km are main streets and the rest are residential.

== Notable streets ==
- Gounaris Avenue (named after prime minister Dimitrios Gounaris)
- Erenstrole Street (named after the Delegate of the neutral Swedish Swiss Commission in the Second World War, Hans H Ehrenstråhle)
- Karatza Street (named after greek officer of the Greek People's Liberation Army Kostas Vourderis or Captain Karatzas as he is better known)
- Nikita Street (named after greek officer of the Greek People's Liberation Army Nikolaos Polikratis or Captain Nikitas as he is better known)
- Vassileiou Roufou Street (named after mayor of Patras Vassileios Roufos)
- Smyrnis Street (named after the Byzantine city of İzmir)
- Londou Street (named after military leader and politician Andreas Londos)
- Charalambi Street (named after politician Asimakis Charambis)
- Heilonos Patreos Street (named after ancient Wrestling Olympic Champion Chilon of Patras)
- Elis Street (named after the Greek region of Elis)

== Famous Residents ==
- Zygmunt Mineyko
