= Glafkos (river) =

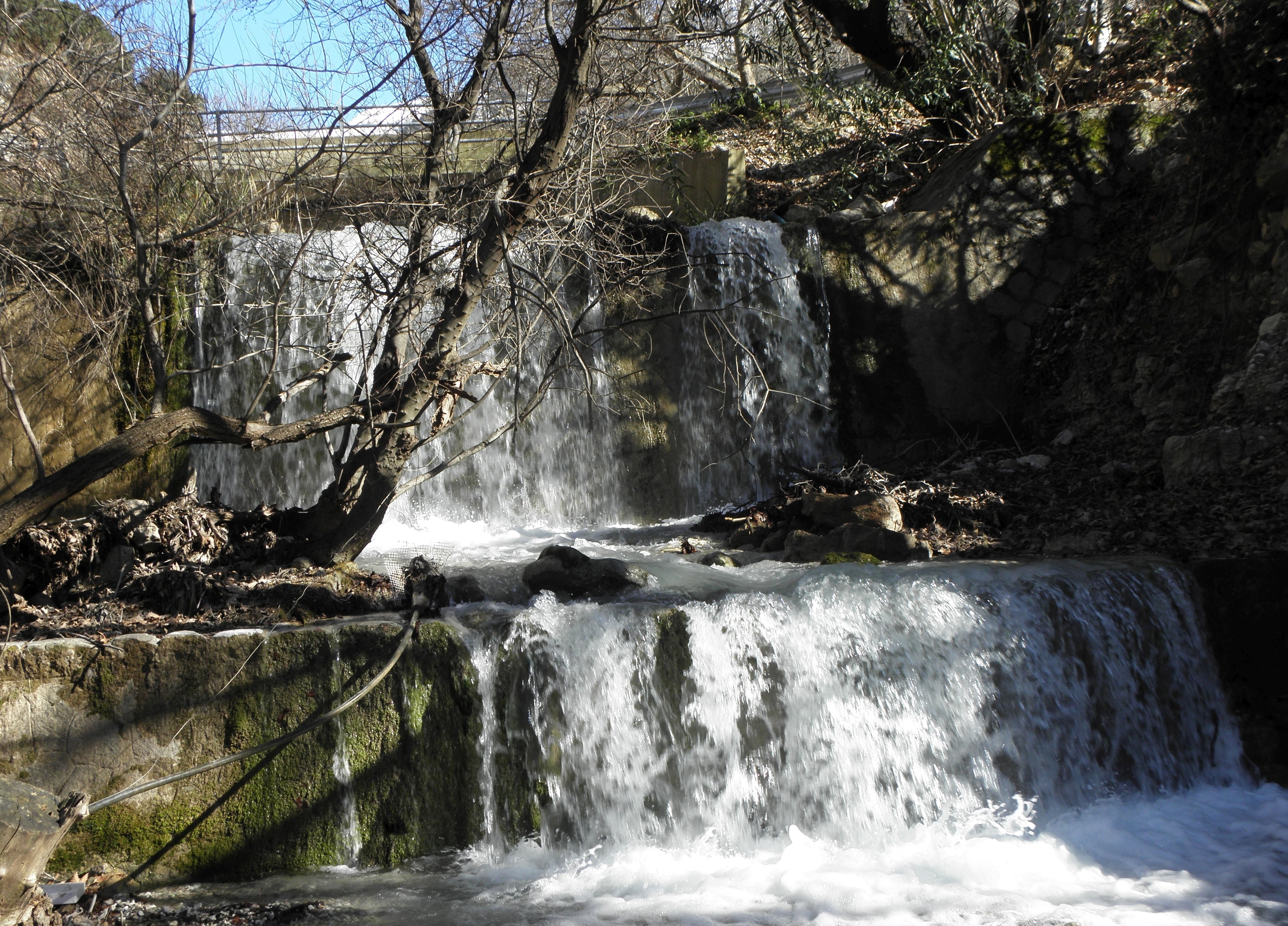
- Vervenikos torrent of Glafkos
- Native name: Γλαύκος (Greek)

Location
- Country: Greece

Physical characteristics
- Source
  - location: Southern Panachaiko
- Mouth
  - location: Gulf of Patras, Ionian Sea
  - coordinates: 38°12′55″N 21°42′58″E
- Length: 26.3 km

The Glafkos (Greek: Γλαύκος, romanized: Gláfkos; Latin: Glaucus) is a small river in the city of Patras, Greece. It flows into the Gulf of Patras (Ionian Sea) in Patras south of the city centre. It is 26.3 km (16.3 mi) long.

A hydroelectric power plant was built on this river in 1927. Currently, it is open to the public as a museum.

Its source is in the southern part of the mountain Panachaiko, near the village Vetaiika. It flows along the villages Moira and Neo Souli, and through the southern part of the city of Patras.

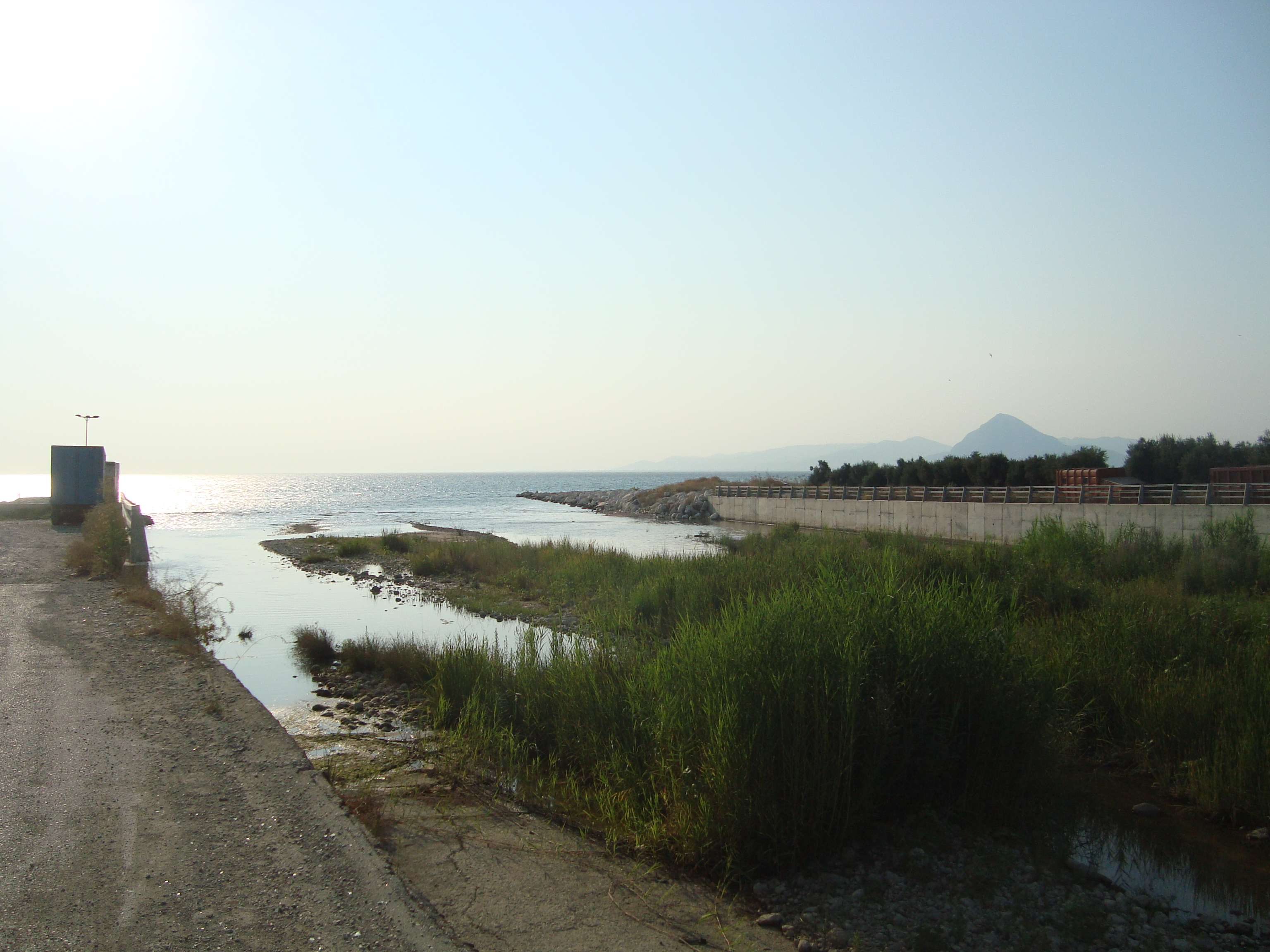
The estuary of Glafkos
