= Metamorfosi Sotiros, Patras =

Neighbourhood in Patras, Greece

Metamorfosi Sotiros (Greek: Μεταμόρφωση Σωτήρος) is a neighbourhood in the southern part of the city of Patras. The area is next to the municipality of Messatida, the subdivision is divided between the two municipalities and then, the communes of Ovrya and Saravali in which are now municipal districts. The subdivision was built in 1970 and many inhabitants came from Tritaia. It also features the central vegetable shop in Patras. The area is the northern part of Demenika. Farmlands covers the outer areas as well as a small forest.

Street names are named after towns in the Elis regional unit. It has a road to Lefka and the road running the south of the Glafkos river which connects with Perivola and Petroto. It also has shops built in the 1970s and 1980s and more in the 1990s up to the Glafkos river.
