= Panagitsa (stream) =

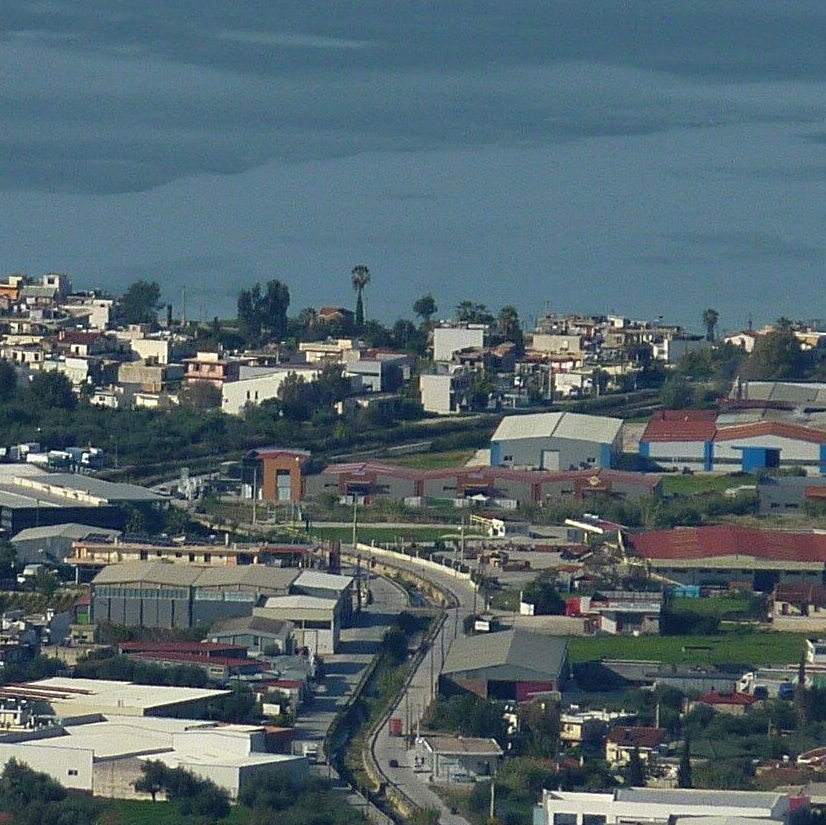
- The lower part of the river facing Paralia and the Gulf of Patras, as seen from Ano Kallithea
- Native name: Παναγίτσα (Greek)

Location
- Country: Greece

Physical characteristics
- Source
  - location: Achaea
- Mouth
  - location: Gulf of Patras
  - coordinates: 38.2047°N 21.7080°E

Panagitsa (Greek: Παναγίτσα) is a small stream in the south of the Patras area in northcentral Achaea, Greece. The source of the Panagitsa is on the western slope of the mountain Omplos, near Omplos Monastery. It flows northwest along the villages Krini and Ovrya. It flows into the Gulf of Patras in Paralia.

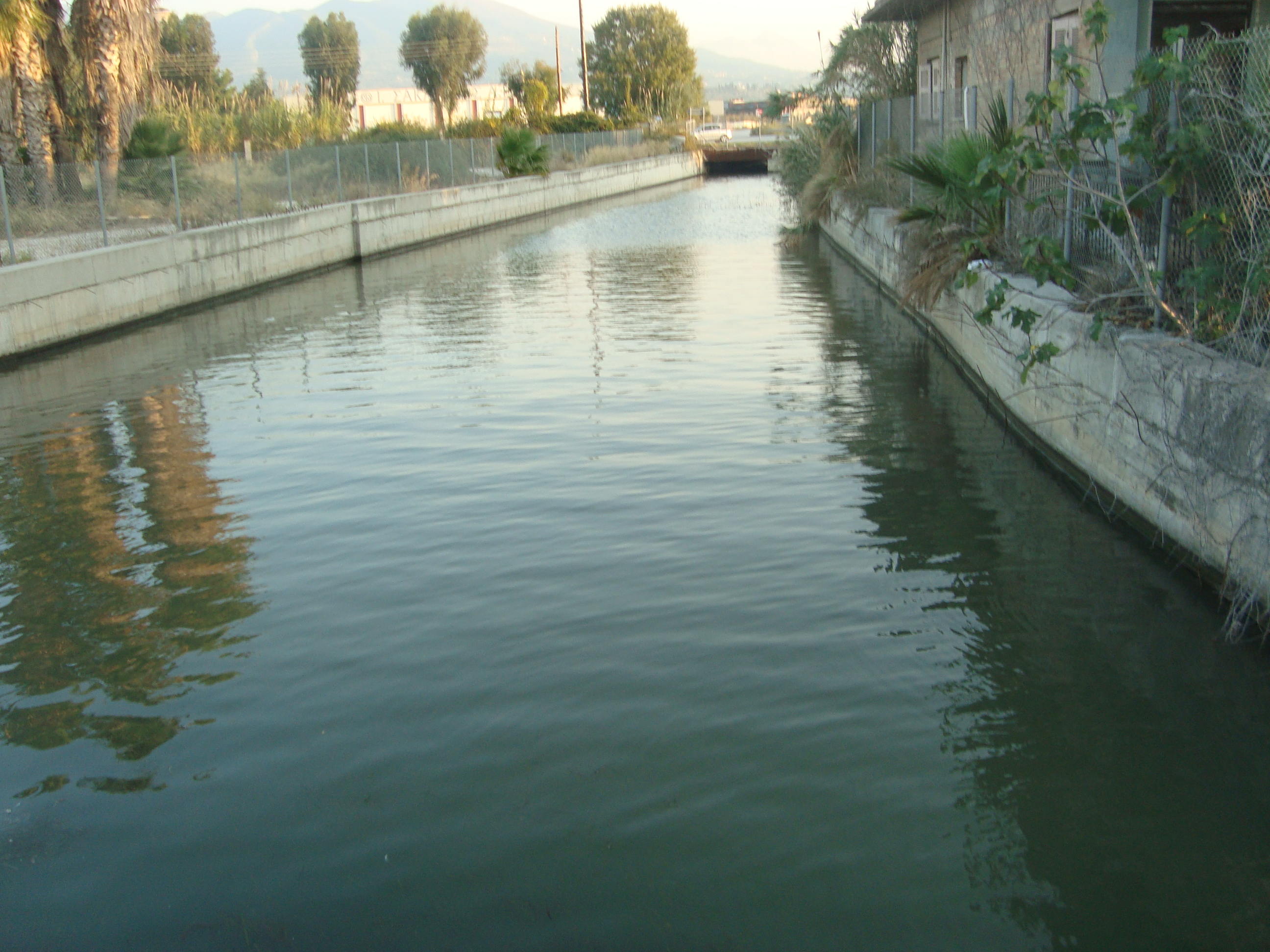
View

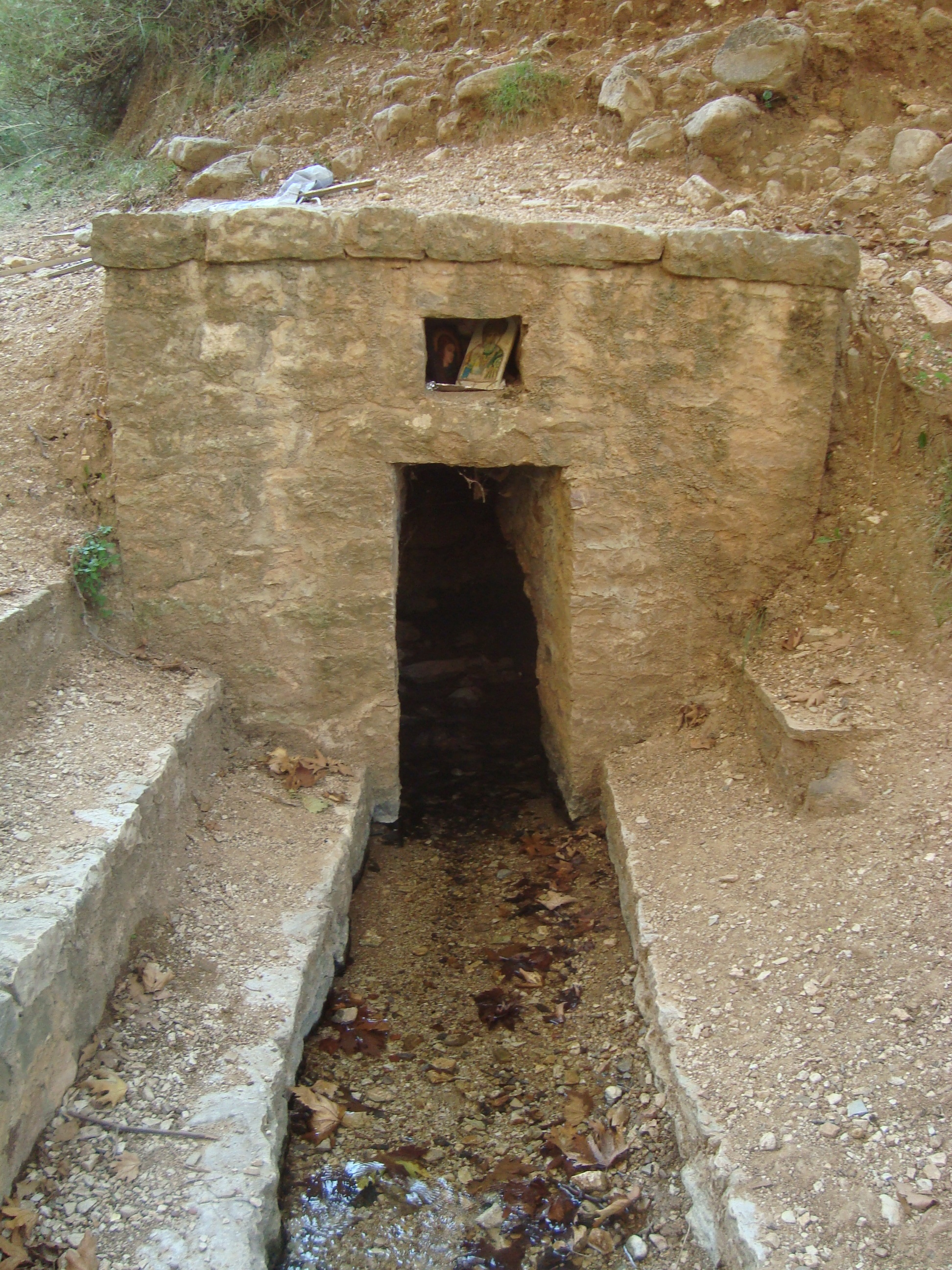
One of the springs where the creek begins, near Krini village at Neromana
