= Anapirika Iteon, Patras =

Neighborhood in Western Greece

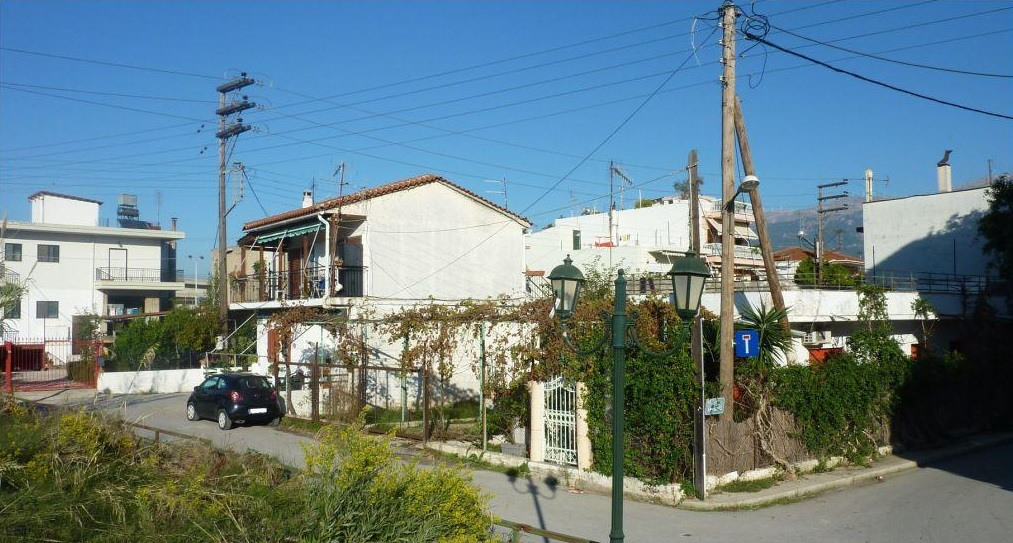
Anapirika Iteon, neighbourhood of Patras

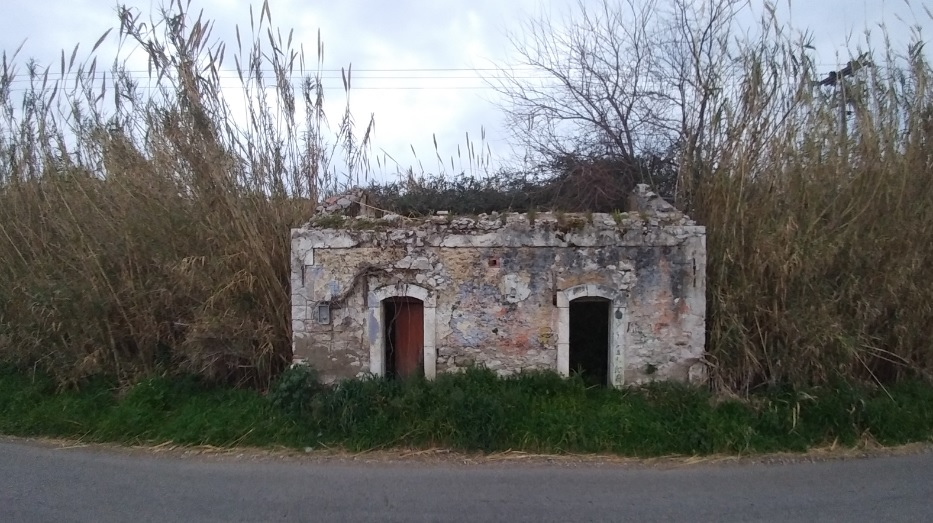
The abandoned building of Ities Patras old railway station.

Anapirika Iteon (Greek: Αναπηρικά Ιτεών) is a neighbourhood in the southern part of the city of Patras. The origin of the name ("Disabled people area") probably derives from the properties of war disabled people there.

== Nearest places ==
- Ities, south
- Kokkinos Milos, south
- Krya Iteon, north
- Lefka, east
- Paralia, south
