= Messatida =

Messatida Μεσσάτιδα
- Municipal unit
- Location within the regional unit

- Location within Greece
- Coordinates: 38°11′N 21°44′E
- Country: Greece
- Administrative region: West Greece
- Regional unit: Achaea
- Municipality: Patras

Area
  - Municipal unit: 66.37 km^{2} (25.63 sq mi)
- Elevation: 50 m (160 ft)

Population (2021)
  - Municipal unit: 14,366
  - Municipal unit density: 216.5/km^{2} (560.6/sq mi)
- Time zone: UTC+2 (EET)
  - Summer (DST): UTC+3 (EEST)
- Postal code: 263 xx, 264 xx, 265 00
- Area code: 2610
- Vehicle registration: ΑΧ

Messatida (Greek: Μεσσάτιδα) is a former municipality in Achaea, West Greece, Greece. Since the 2011 local government reform it is part of the municipality Patras, of which it is a municipal unit. The seat of the municipality was in Ovria. It is located south of Patras city centre, and stretches from the urbanized plains near the Gulf of Patras to the Omplos hills in the east. It has an area of 66.366 km².

Messatida was named after the ancient Achaean town Mesatis, according to local legend the place where Dionysus was reared.

== Population history ==
Historical population
| Year | Pop. | ±% |
|---|---|---|
| 1991 | 9,583 | — |
| 2001 | 12,246 | +27.8% |
| 2011 | 13,852 | +13.1% |
| 2021 | 14,366 | +3.7% |

== Subdivisions ==
The municipal unit Messatida is subdivided into the following communities (constituent villages in brackets):

- Kallithea (Kallithea, Ano Kallithea)
- Krini (Krini, Agios Kostantinos)
- Krystallovrysi
- Ovria
- Petroto (Petroto, Mavromandila, Agia Paraskevi)
- Saravali (Saravali, Agios Stefanos, Demenika, Kefalovryso, Bakari)
- Thea (Thea, Lygies, Pavlokastro)

== Sport Clubs ==
- Fostiras Ovrias FC (football)
- Achilleas Ovrias (football)
- Atlas Ovrias (football)
- Milon Ovrias (volleyball)
- Phoenix Ovrias (basketball)
- Achaios Saravali (football & basketball)
- Galini Demenika (basketball, ping pong, baseball, football & softball)
- Krini 97' (basketball)
- A.O. Krini (football)
- A.O. Thea (football)
- A.O. Kalithea (football)
- Galaxias Demenika (basketball)
- Ikaros Petroto (football)

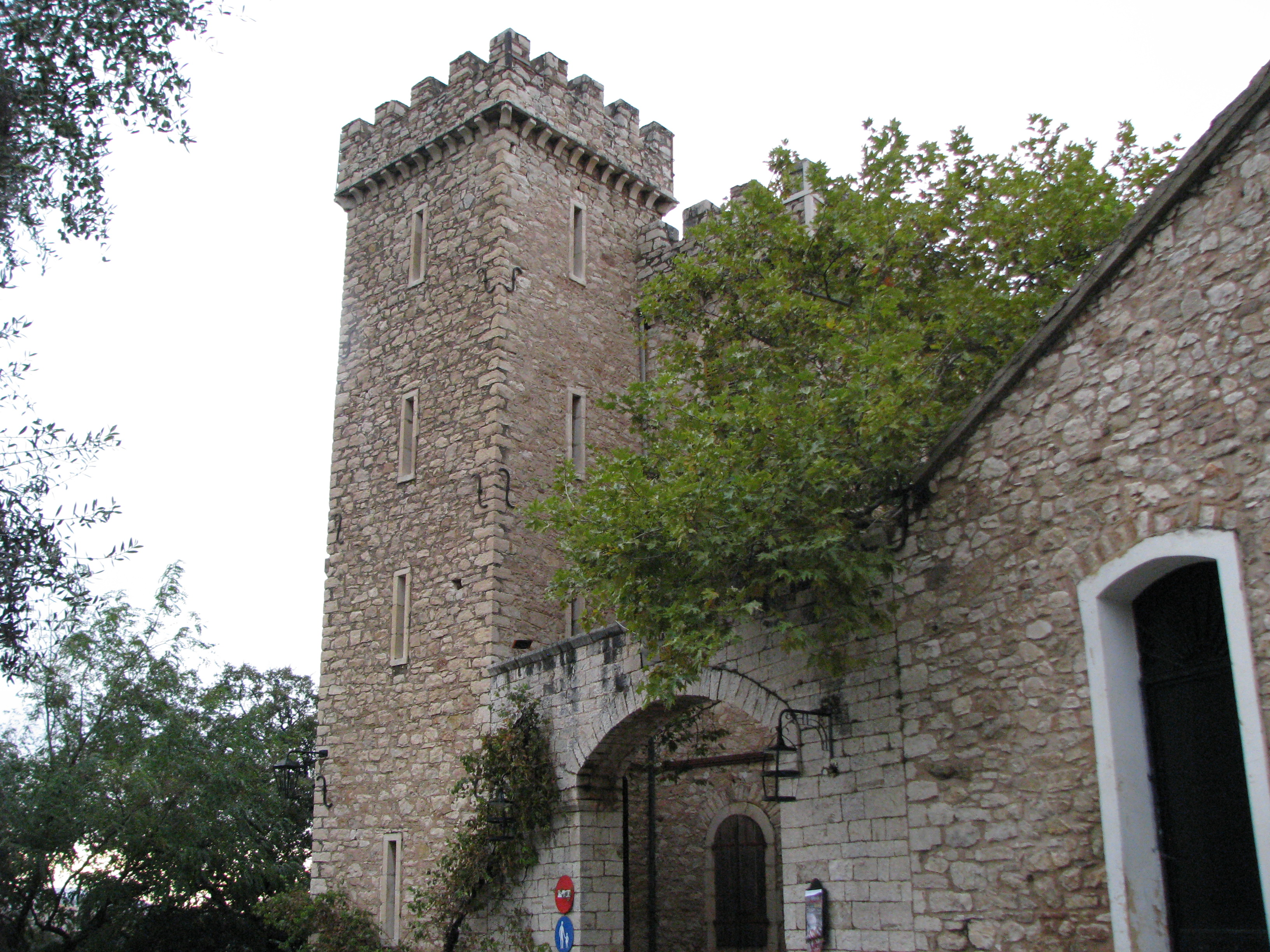
Achaia Clauss winery in Messatida
