= Sidirokastro (Achaea) =

Castle in Achaea, Greece

Coordinates: 38.1665°N 21.7656°E

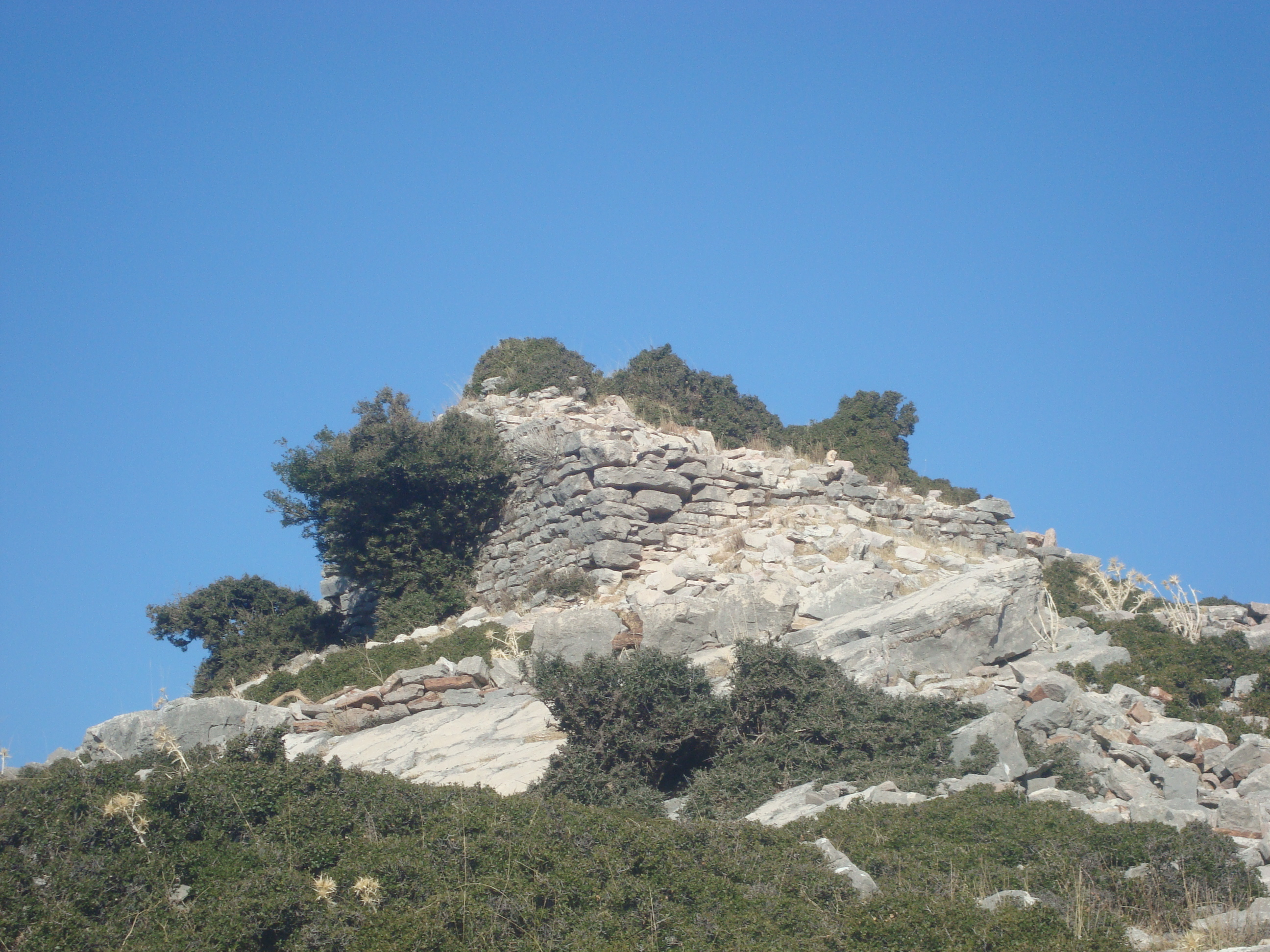
Remains of a tower (2011)

Sidirokastro (Greek: Σιδηρόκαστρο literally "the iron castle") was a castle in Achaea, Greece, situated between the villages Krini and Kallithea. It is located on one of the foothills of the Panachaiko, the Omplos, near the Omblos Monastery in Zoitada. Little remains of the castle. It is unknown when exactly it was built, most likely by the Franks of the Principality of Achaea. It was used for the defense of Patras, around which the Venetians had built many small castle-fortresses.

It was first mentioned in a list of castles of Achaea in 1364. Nothing is known about its history, although it was situated in a strategical location next to the old road to Kalavryta, known as the Makelarias Road. It is believed that the iron gate of the Omplos Monastery is originally from the castle. The name "Sidirokastro" comes from the slate stones in the vicinity, that are called "sideropetra" ("iron stones") by the locals.

== Sources ==
- Kostas Triandafyllos Patras Historic Dictionary, Third edition, Patras 1995
- Stefanos Thomopoulos, History of the Cities of Patras, Patras 1999, Achaikes ekdoseis, Volume II
