= Battle of Chalandritsa =

1822 battle of the Greek War of Independence

- Part of the Greek War of Independence
Date	26 February 1822
Location	Chalandritsa, Achaea, Morea Eyalet, Ottoman Empire 38°06′42″N 21°47′03″E
Result	Greek victory

Belligerents
Greek revolutionaries	Ottoman Empire

Commanders and leaders
Gennaios Kolokotronis; Dimitris Plapoutas; Apostolis Kolokotronis; Constantinos Petmezas	Mehmet Pasha

Strength
Smaller than the Turks	~ 2,000 soldiers

Casualties and losses
20 dead	300 dead Numerous wounded

The Battle of Chalandritsa took place on 26 May 1822, in the town of the same name in Achaea in the Peloponnese. In this conflict, Greek forces under Dimitris Plapoutas, Gennaios Kolokotronis and other chieftains faced the Turkish troops of Mehmet Pasha. The outcome of the battle was victorious for the Greeks.

== Before the battle ==
On January 25, shortly after the death of Ali Pasha of Ioannina, the Turkish army of Hurshid Pasha could now freely head towards the Peloponnese and Central Greece. Shortly afterwards, the Turkish fleet sailed to Patras and landed 8,000-9,000 Turks, coming for the first time from Asia Minor, led by Mehmet Pasha. The Greeks would soon face this army. The situation was critical for them.

== Kolokotroni's actions ==
In the period preceding, on January 20, Theodoros Kolokotronis left the Corinth camp and headed for Karytaina to gather an army with the aim of ending up in Patras. Despite the objections of many politicians the impending danger left no room for error, and so with the assembly of Epidaurus Kolokotronis was appointed commander-in-chief of the siege of Patras. After his appointment, having reached a compromise with the Deligiannai, Kolokotronis decided to abandon Karytaina. He then passed through Vytina and headed towards Patras. In addition to the men of Karytaina, he gathered another 6,000. Before he himself arrived he ordered Dimitris Plapoutas to occupy the key position in Saravali, Konstantinos Petmezas in Paleopyrgos, and Gennaios Kolokotronis in Ovria, positions and areas that were near Patras.

== The battle ==
The eastern Turkish army left the city on February 26 with the intention of plundering. From this body, approximately 2,000 men headed towards Chalandritsa. The Patras and the Koumaniots, who occupied this position, were forced to abandon it, thus finally leaving the Turks undisturbed to plunder the area. On the way back to Patras, however, the Turks came face to face with Gennaios, Petmezas (800 men), Apostolos Kolokotronis, and Plapoutas (1,500 men); the Greek chieftains rallied to face the common danger. Despite the numerical superiority of the Turks, the use of Ottoman machine guns and the arrival of a Turkish auxiliary corps from Tsoukala, the Greeks managed to put their opponents to flight.

== Turkish losses & the importance of the battle ==
The Battle of Chalandritsa turned out to be a disaster for the Turks. Over 300 soldiers died, while many were also wounded. The Greeks lost only 20 warriors. The importance of the battle for the Greeks, however, is not only found in the heavy losses they inflicted on their opponents. With this victory against the eastern Turks, the Kaklamans, as they were contemptuously called, opened the way for the expulsion of the Turkish troops from the region.

== Sources ==
- Κόκκινος, Δ. (1974). Η ελληνική επανάστασις, Τόμος 2. Αθήνα: Μέλισσα.
- Κρέμος, Γ. (1879). Χρονολόγια της ελληνικής ιστορίας – Τόμος 3: 1453-1830. Αθήνα: Τυπογραφείο Δημητρίου Ιασεμίδου.
- Σφυρόερας, Β. (1975). Σταθεροποίηση της επαναστάσεως, 1822-1823. Ιστορία του ελληνικού έθνους – Τόμος 12: Η ελληνική επανάσταση και η ίδρυση του ελληνικού κράτους (1813-1822) (σελ. 212-286). Αθήνα: Εκδοτική Αθηνών.
- Τρικούπης Σ. (1888). Ιστορία της Ελληνικής Επαναστάσεως, Τόμος 2. Αθήνα: Ώρα.
