= Ities, Patras =

Ities (Greek: Ιτιές, meaning: willows) is a suburb in the southern part of the city of Patras. The origin of the name comes from the willow tree which used to be plentiful in the area. Until 1900, the area, which was the small swamp, was drained.

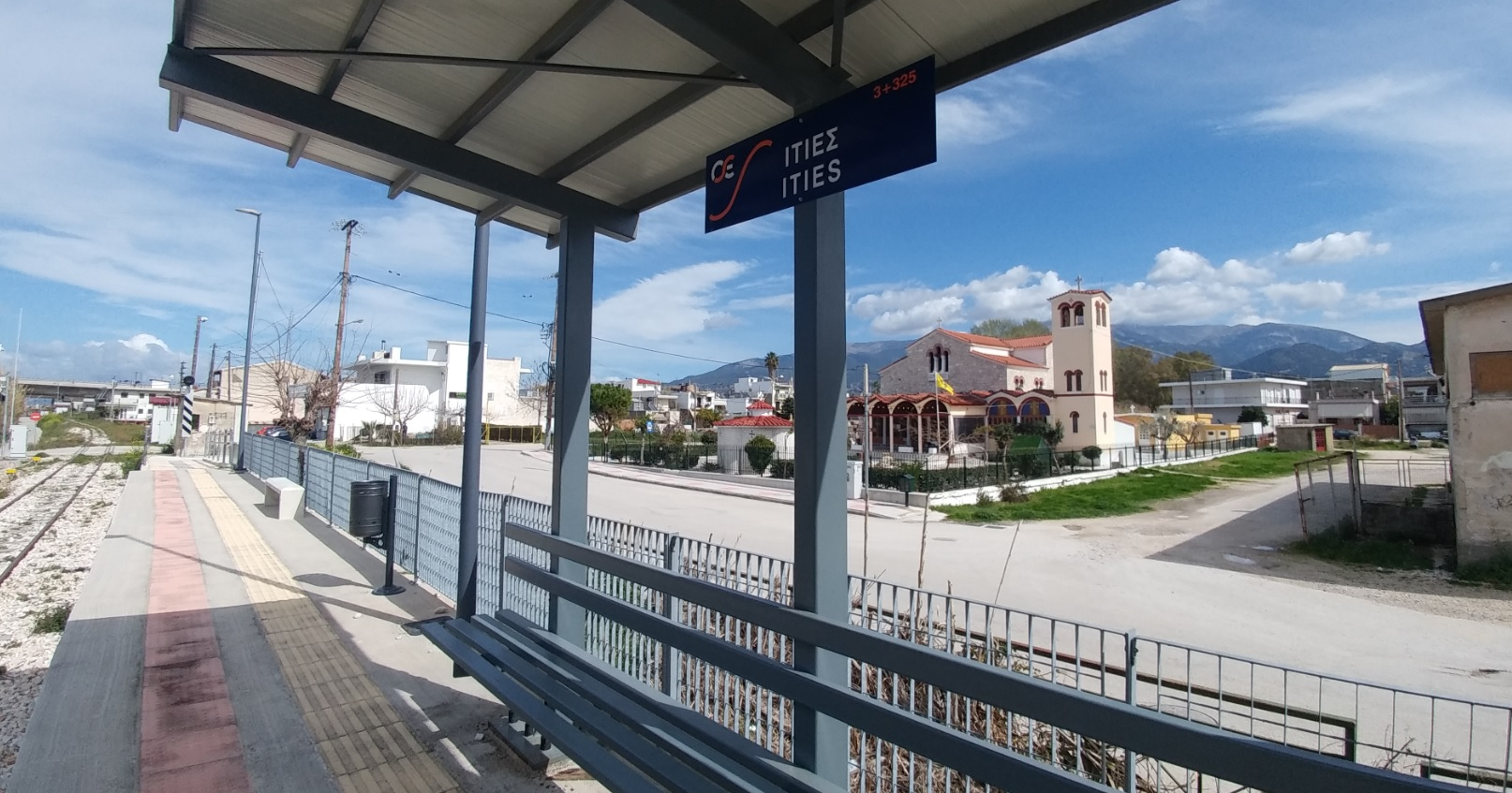
Patras' Suburban Railway "Agios Georgios - Ities" Station.

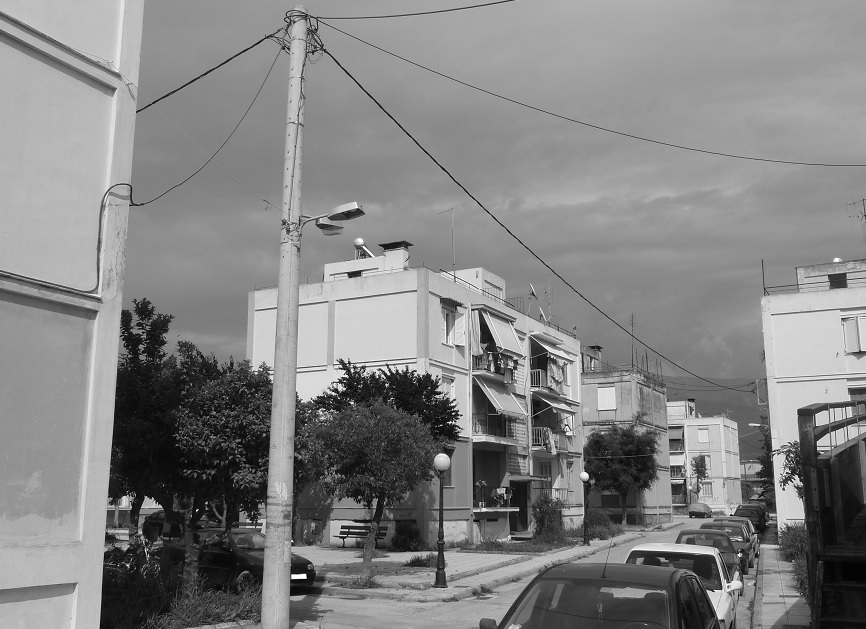
Partial view of Labour Houses at Ities, Patras, Greece.

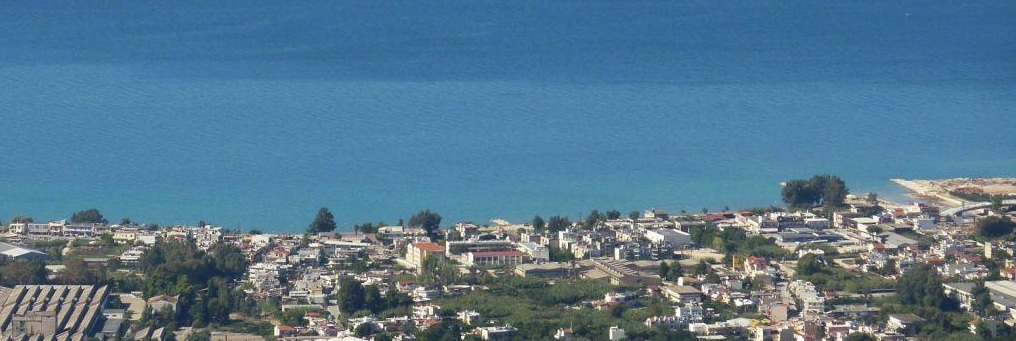
Ities, suburb of Patras, view from Omplos Mt.

== Nearest places ==
- Anapirika Iteon, north
- Kokkinos Milos, south
- Krya Iteon, north
- Lefka, east
- Paralia, south

== Notice ==
- The first version of the article is translated from the article at the Greek Wikipedia (el:Main Page)
