= Leika =

Leika may refer to:

- Leica Camera AG, a German camera and optics manufacturer
- Lefka, Patras, a neighbourhood in the southern part of the Greek city of Patras
- Leika (Ethiopia), a town in central Ethiopia
