= Lefka, Patras =

Neighborhood of Patras, Greece

Coordinates: 38.2090°N 21.7273°E

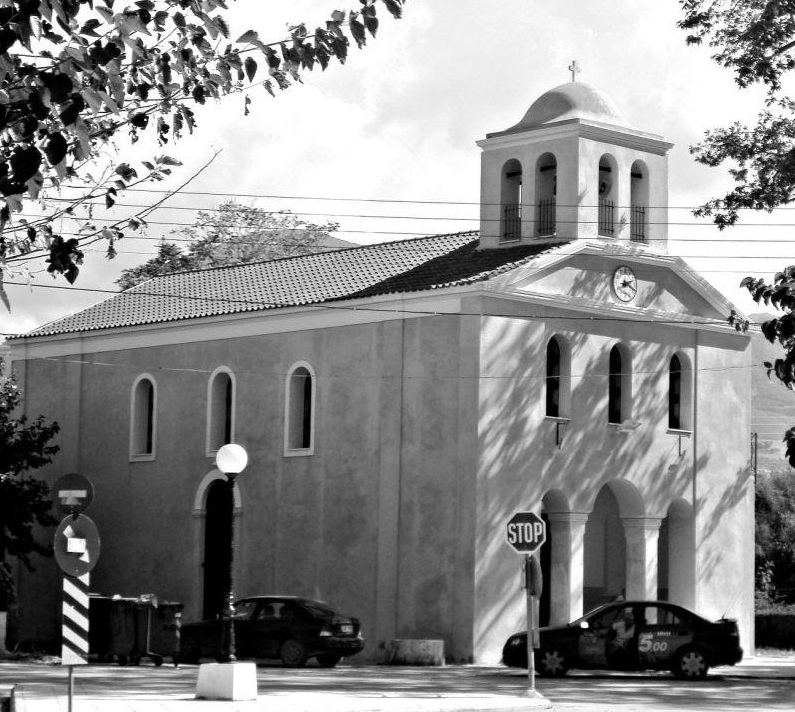
Christian Orthodox church dedicated to Saint Nicholas at Lefka, Patras, Greece.

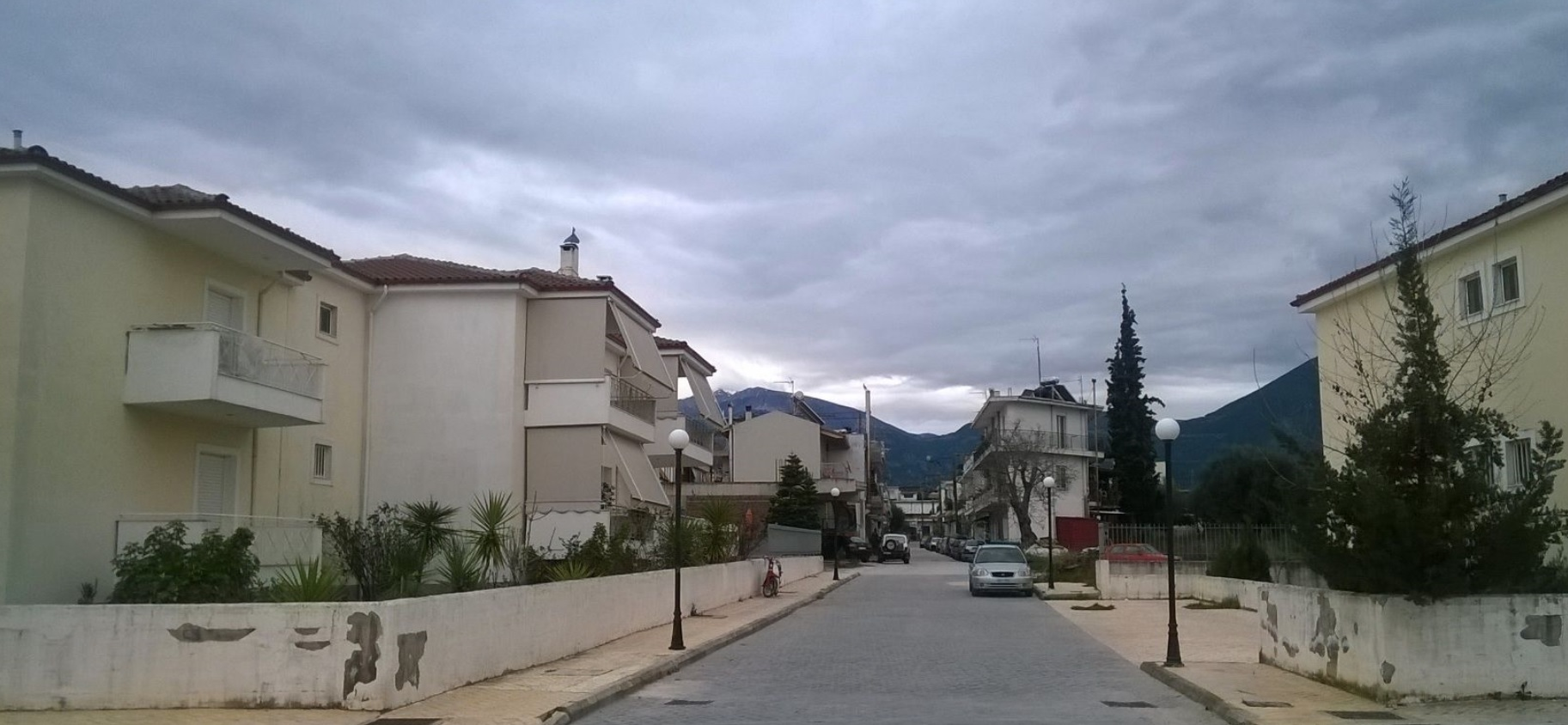
Partial view of Labour Houses "PATRAS XIV" at Lefka, Patras, Greece.

Lefka (Greek: Λεύκα, meaning: poplar) is a neighbourhood in the southern part of the Greek city of Patras, 5 km (3.1 mi) directly and 6 km (3.7 mi) south via road from downtown. It was originally called "Botovayia" ("Μποτοβάγια" in Greek).

Lefka is linked with the Akti Dymaion (EO9/E55 - Patras-Pyrgos-Kyparissia) and Akrotiriou Street (EO3 - Patras-Tripoli southbound), Evias Street, Iteon Street and Lefkas Street. Lefka's residents work in agriculture, and the remainder work on other businesses.

== Nearest subdivisions ==
- Demenika, east

== Nearest places ==
- Ities, west
- Kokkinos Milos, west
- Ovrya, southeast
- Paralia, southwest

== Streets ==
- Agiou Nikolaou Lefkas Street
- Akti Dymaion Blvd.
- Iteon Street
- Lefkas Street
- Evias Street
- The new EO33 (Patras - Tripoli) - a two way bypass

== Geography ==
The area is made up of farmlands and consists of olive and citrus groves and cattle farms. Tomatoes, potatoes, beans, zucchinis, onions, watermelons, melons and others are also grown in the region. Lefka's nearest supermarket is Akti Dymaion to the northwest. Its total area is approximately 5.5 km^{2} (2.1 sq mi), and 3 km (1.9 mi) in length, from west to east, and 2 km (1.2 mi) in width from north to south. Its total street length is approximately 13 km (8.1 mi), of which 4.5 km (2.8 mi) are main streets; the rest are residential. The built-up area lies north of the Glafkos river, which is Leyka's north side, with the exception of a tract north of the neighbourhood.

== History ==
The housing developments to the present day did not reach Lefka, due to that is away from the urban capacity. Not much housing development has been done since the early 2000s, and the population has been unchanged, compared to other neighbourhoods in Patras.

The Glafkos road was added in the form of gravel in the 1970s. It was later paved in the mid-1980s, became one-way, and was fully opened in 1995. Its streetlights were added in the late 1990s.

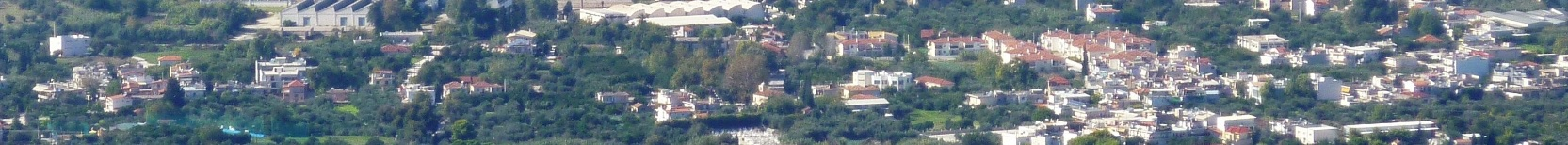
Lefka, suburb of Patras, view from Omplos Mt.
