= Petroto, Achaea =

Petroto Πετρωτό
- Community
- Location within Greece
- Coordinates: 38°10′N 21°48′E
- Country: Greece
- Administrative region: West Greece
- Regional unit: Achaea
- Municipality: Patras
- Municipal unit: Messatida

Population (2021)
  - Community: 543
- Time zone: UTC+2 (EET)
  - Summer (DST): UTC+3 (EEST)
- Vehicle registration: AX

Petroto (Greek: Πετρωτό) is a village and a community in the municipal unit of Messatida, Patras, Achaea, Greece. The community consists of the villages Petroto, Mavromandila and Agia Paraskevi. Mavromandila is by far the largest village of the community. Mavromandila is located 6 km southeast of Patras city centre, just outside the Patras beltway (Greek National Road 9). The small mountain villages Petroto and Agia Paraskevi are located resp. 5 and 9 km southeast from Mavromandila, to the east and southeast of Omplos mountain. The renowned Achaia Clauss winery is situated in Mavromandila.

== Geography ==
The territory of the community Petroto stretches from the coastal plains to the low mountains in the south and east. Mavromandila is at about 130 m elevation, Petroto at 730 m and Agia Paraskevi at about 900 m. The river Glafkos flows east and north of the community. Pine forests cover the mountainous southeastern part. Adjacent communities are Saravali to the west, Neo Souli to the north, Moira to the east and Krystallovrysi to the south.

== History ==
In 1821, during the Greek War of Independence, an important battle took place at Petroto (then known as Palaiopyrgos) and nearby Saravali. This was part of the liberation of Patras.

=== Historical population ===
Year	Population village	Population community
1981	-	393
1991	33	-
2001	25	417
2011	164	639
2021	32	543

== See also ==
- List of settlements in Achaea
