= Mavrodafni =

Variety of grape

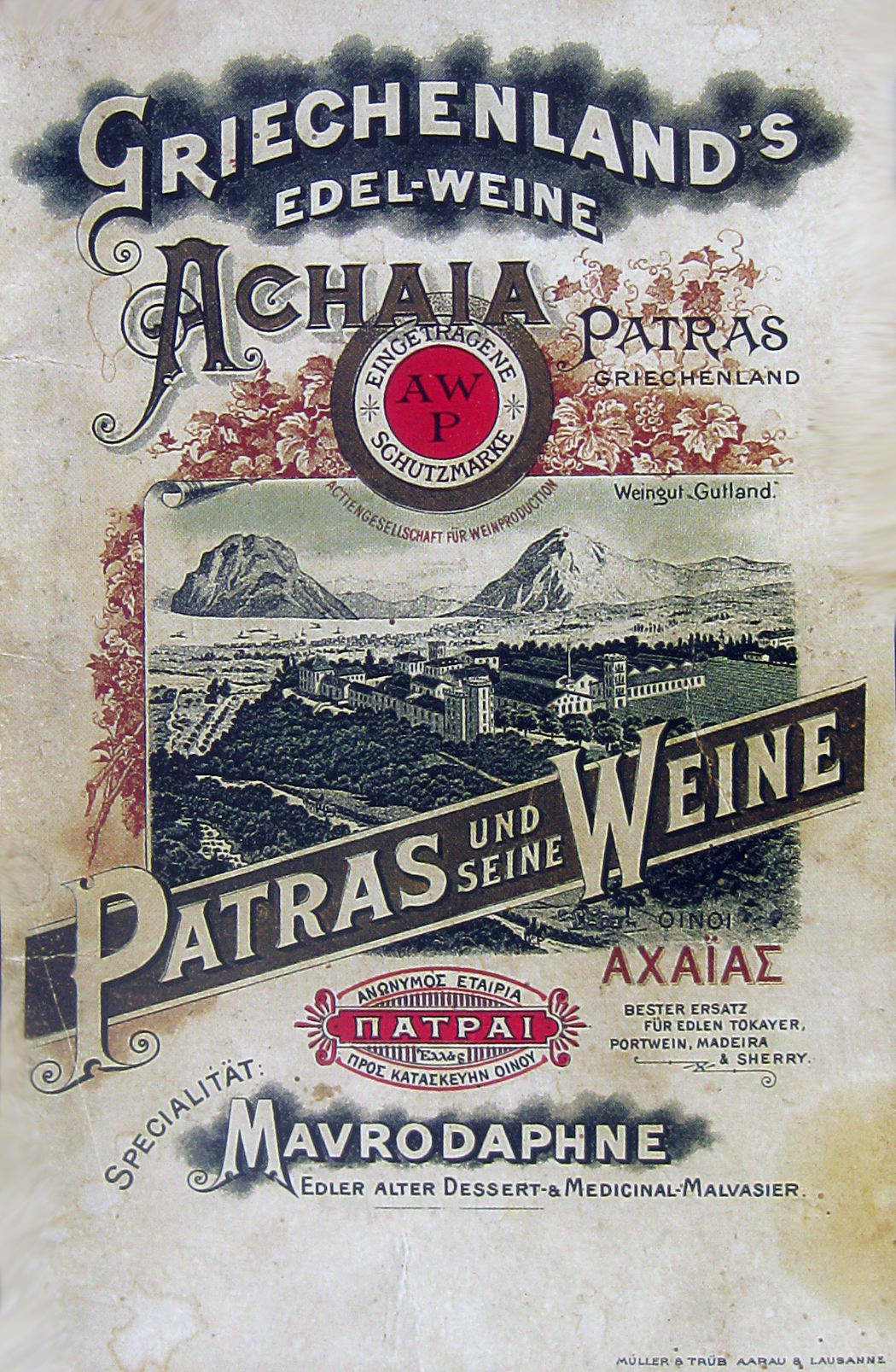
Old advertising for Mavrodaphne in Germany

Mavrodaphni, Mavrodaphne, or Mavrodafni (Greek: Μαυροδάφνη lit. 'black laurel') is a black wine grape indigenous to the Achaea region in Northern Peloponnese, Greece. It is also the name of a traditionally sweet fortified wine style; first produced from Gustav Clauss in around 1850.

The wine is described as a rich, Port-like Greek varietal associated with the Pátras area, though Kefalonia (Cephalonia) also identified as an important growing area.

While historically linked to sweet, fortified wines, contemporary production also includes dry red wines made from Mavrodaphne, and the grape is sometimes used as a blending component in modern Greek reds.

== Winemaking ==
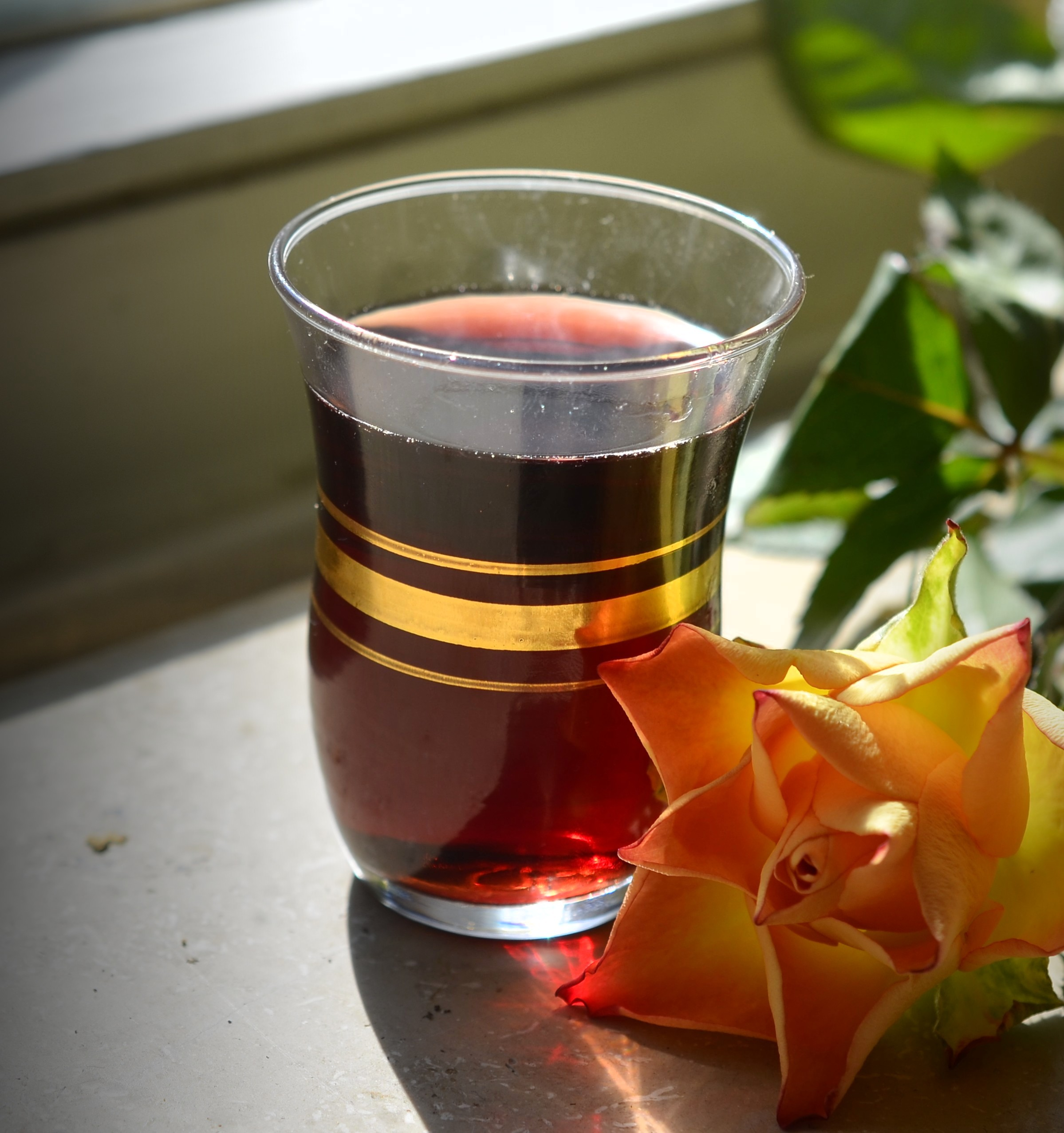
A glass

Mavrodaphni is initially vinified in large vats exposed to the sun. Once the wine reaches a certain level of maturity, fermentation is stopped by adding distillate prepared from previous vintages. Then the Mavrodaphni distillate and the wine, still containing residual sugar, is transferred to the underground cellars to complete its maturation. There it is "educated" by contact with older wine using the solera method of serial blending. Once aged, the wine is bottled and sold as a dessert wine under the Mavrodaphni Protected designation of origin, with prolonged cask aging and solera-style maturation characteristic of the traditional fortified style; by contrast, dry, unfortified Mavrodaphne wines are produced using different vinification methods.

== Wine ==
Mavrodaphni is a dark, almost opaque wine with a dark purple reflected color and a purple-brown transmitted color. It presents aromas and flavors of caramel, chocolate, coffee, raisins and plums. Other tasting coverage also mentioned fig, spice, nutty and herbal tones, and in some cases cedar or tobacco aromas.

== History ==
Mavrodaphne literally means "black laurel". The name was chosen by Gustav Clauss, the founder of the Achaia Clauss winery, because of the berries' resemblance to those of the laurel, though there are various stories about a lover, fiancée, or wife named Daphne, who had black eyes or who died.
