= Mintilogli =

Mintilogli Μιντιλόγλι
- Community
- Location within Greece
- Coordinates: 38°11′05″N 21°42′02″E
- Country: Greece
- Geographic region: Peloponnese
- Administrative region: West Greece
- Regional unit: Achaea
- Municipality: Patras
- Municipal unit: Paralia

Population (2021)
  - Community: 2,331
- Time zone: UTC+2 (EET)
  - Summer (DST): UTC+3 (EEST)
- Postal code: 265 00
- Area code: 2610
- Vehicle registration: AX

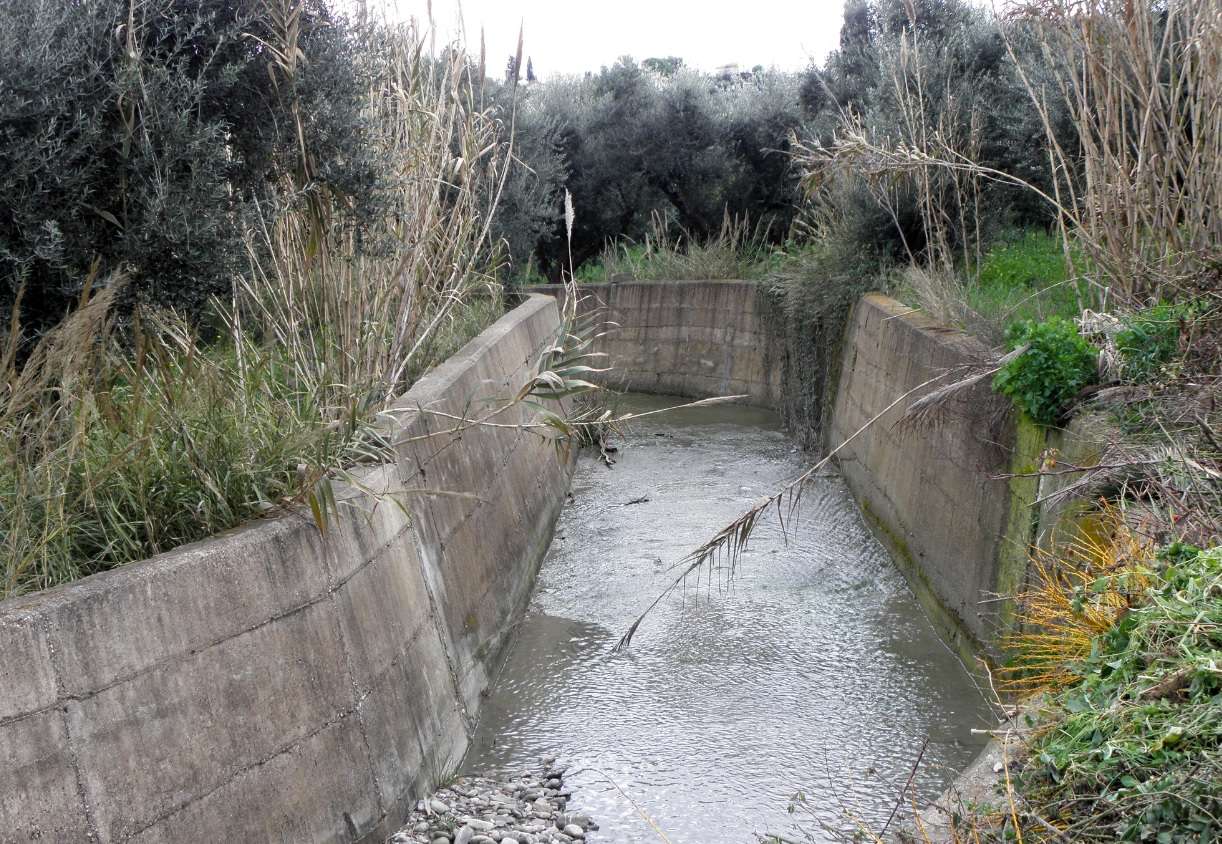
Ligias, a torrent in Mintilogli

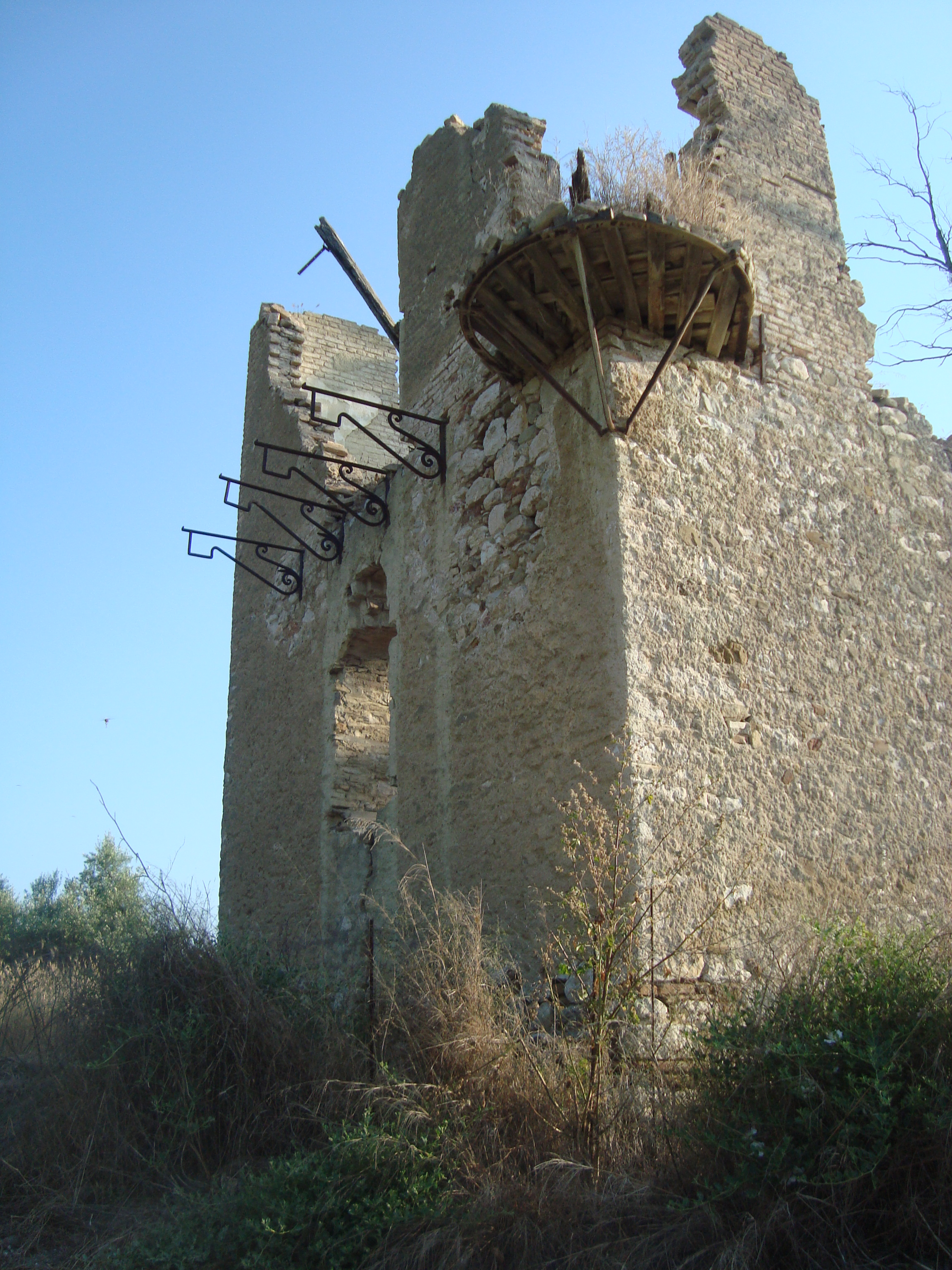
Bey Mintiloglou old house ruins

Mintilogli or Midilogli (Greek: Μιντιλόγλι /midi'loɣli/) is a village and a community in the municipal unit of Paralia in the municipality of Patras in Achaea, Greece. It is 1 km south of Paralia, and 8 km southwest of Patras city centre. Ovria is to the east. The community consists of the villages Mintilogli (seat) and Chantziliako. Its population is around 2,000. Greek National Road 9 (Patras - Pyrgos) passes the village on the north and west.

== See also ==
- List of settlements in Achaea
