= Battle of Patras (1772) =

1772 battle of the Russo-Turkish War (1768–1774)

- Part of the Russo-Turkish War of 1768–1774
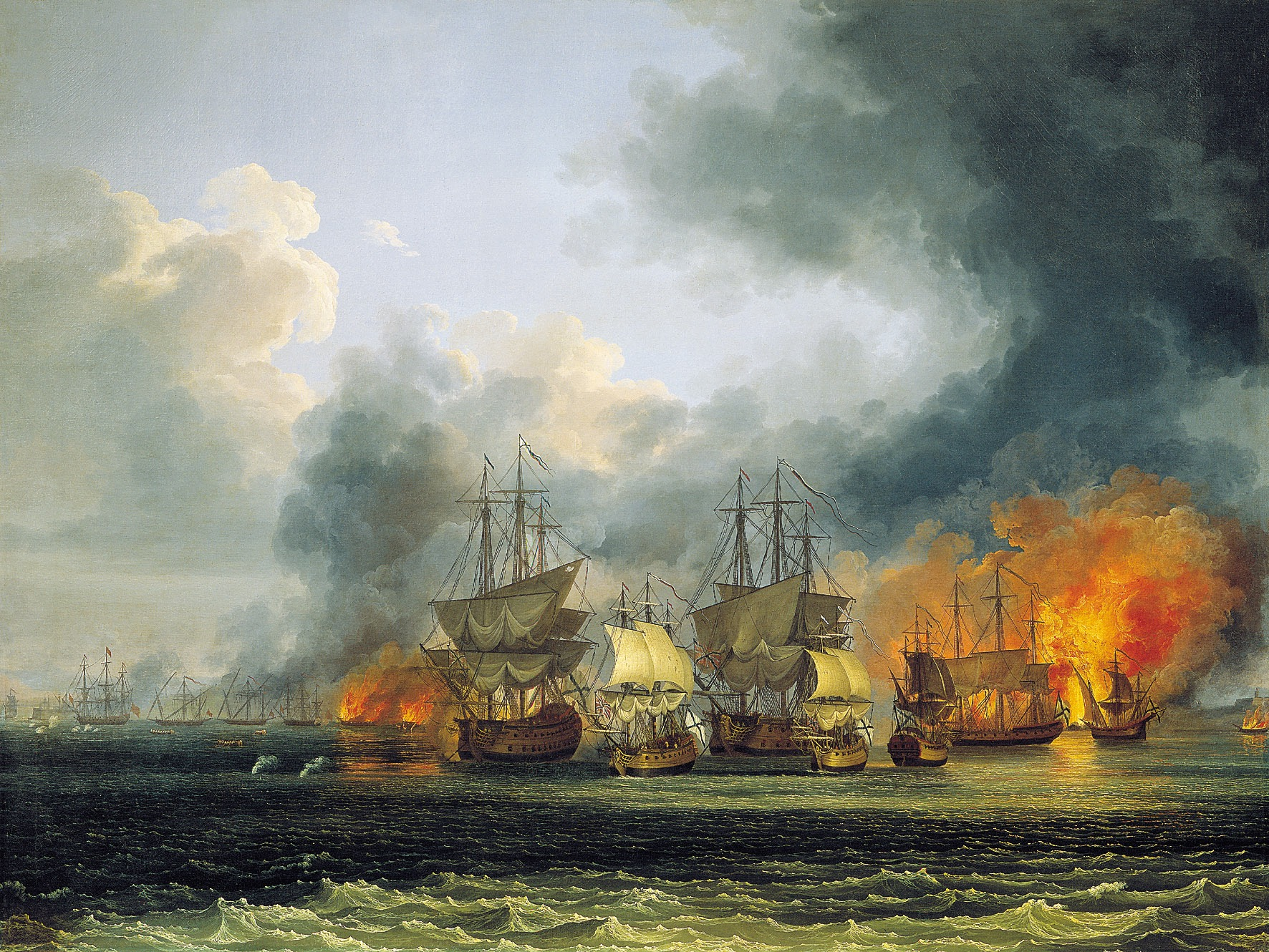
- The Battle of Patras; Jacob Philipp Hackert, 1778
Date	6–8 November 1772
Location	near Patrai, Morea Eyalet (now in Greece)
Result	Russian victory

Belligerents
Russian Empire	Ottoman Empire

Commanders and leaders
Mikhail Konyaev	Mustafa Pasha

Strength
7 warships: 2 ships of the line, 1 frigate, 3 sloops of war, 1 galliot	25 warships: 9 frigates and 16 xebecs

Casualties and losses
No ships lost	All frigates and 10 xebecs lost

This battle took place on 6, 7, and 8 November 1772, during the Russo-Turkish War (1768–74) in the Gulf of Patras, Greece, when a Russian fleet under Mikhail Konyaev defeated an Ottoman force of frigates and xebecs, destroying all 9 frigates and 10 out of 16 xebecs while losing no ships.

== History ==
Konyaev left Livorno on 6 September 1772, and from 5 October onwards, he cruised around Cerigo with Tchesma and Graf Orlov. On 23 October, he was joined by Sv. Nikolai and on 27 October by Zabiaka, Slava, Auza, and Modon, which had been detached from Orlov's fleet at Mykonos under Voinovitch. They brought news of an Ottoman force in the Gulf of Patras, so Konyaev and Voinovitch combined forces to look for it.

On 5 November, they arrived near Patras, and found 9 30-gun frigates and 12 xebecs at sea, plus 4 xebecs anchored under the guns of the fort.

On 6 November, they attacked with their smaller vessels in front due to the narrowness of the channel, and the Ottomans retreated. One xebec ran aground and was destroyed by Sv. Nikolai, Zabiaka, and Modon. Sv. Nikolai and Slava cut off a frigate and another xebec and forced them aground where they were abandoned, and then burnt by Auza. The remaining Ottomans took refuge under the fort.

In the afternoon of 7 November, the Russians attacked again, standing back and forth along the Ottoman line to no great effect.

On 8 November, they anchored near the Ottoman line, attacking around 11:30 am. By the time around 12 pm, several Ottoman vessels were on fire and abandoned; Konyaev weighed anchor and sent in the boats under protection of Sv. Nikolai, Zabiaka, and Slava to destroy or capture. 7 frigates and 8 xebecs were destroyed, while the remaining frigate and 6 xebecs sailed further up the gulf. The frigate soon ran aground and was destroyed by Slava.

On 15 November, Konyaev left for the Aegean Sea.

== Ships involved ==
=== Russia (Konyaev) ===
Tchesma 80
Graf Orlov 66
Sv. Nikolai 26
Zabiaka 18
Slava 16
Auza 12
Modon 12

=== Ottoman Empire ===
9 frigates of 30 guns - 1 destroyed on 6 November, 8 destroyed on 8 November
16 xebecs of 20-30 guns - 2 destroyed on 6 November, 8 destroyed on 8 November
