= Roitika =

Roitika Ροΐτικα
- Community
- Location within Greece
- Coordinates: 38°11′N 21°41′E
- Country: Greece
- Administrative region: West Greece
- Regional unit: Achaea
- Municipality: Patras
- Municipal unit: Paralia

Population (2021)
  - Community: 1,194
- Time zone: UTC+2 (EET)
  - Summer (DST): UTC+3 (EEST)
- Vehicle registration: AX

Roitika or Rogitika (Greek: Ροΐτικα or Ρογίτικα) is a village in the municipal unit of Paralia, Achaea, Greece. It is situated on the Gulf of Patras, 2 km southwest of the village Paralia, and 8 km southwest from Patras city centre. The population is around 1,200. The Greek National Road 9 (Patras - Pyrgos) runs east of the village.

== See also ==
- List of settlements in Achaea
