= Gulf of Patras =

Branch of the Ionian Sea in Greece

- Πατραϊκός Κόλπος (Greek)
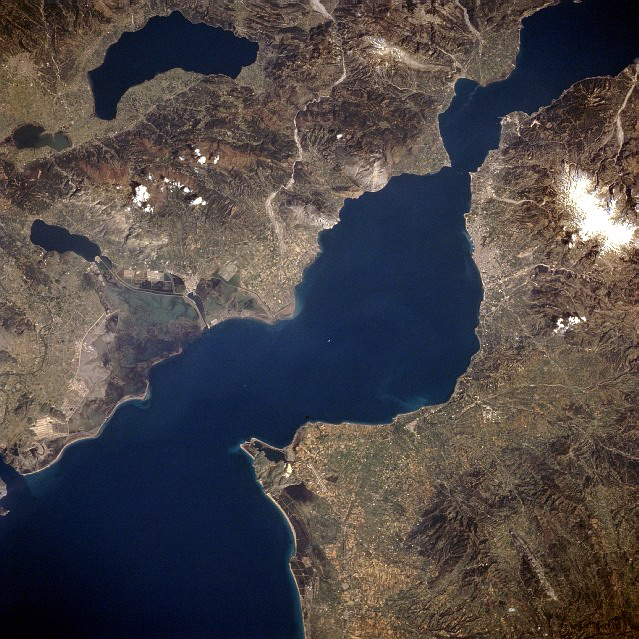
- Gulf of Patras from space, top is North-East

- Location within Greece
- Coordinates: 38°15′N 21°30′E
- Ocean/sea sources: Ionian Sea
- Basin countries: Greece
- Max. length: 45 km (28 mi)
- Max. width: 20 km (12 mi)
- Surface area: c. 400 km^{2} (150 sq mi)
- Settlements: Patras (south side)

The Gulf of Patras (Greek: Πατραϊκός Κόλπος, Patraikós Kólpos) is a branch of the Ionian Sea in Western Greece. On the east, it is closed by the Strait of Rion between capes Rio and Antirrio, near the Rio-Antirrio bridge, that is the entrance of the Gulf of Corinth. On the west, it is bounded by a line from Oxeia island to Cape Araxos. To the north it is bounded by the shore of Aetolia-Acarnania in continental Greece, and to the south by Achaea in the Peloponnese peninsula. It is 40–50 km (25–31 mi) long, 10–20 km (6–12 mi) wide, and has an area of 350–400 km^{2}.

The port city of Patras lies to the southeast and is the only major port on the gulf. It serves ferries to Ancona and Brindisi in Italy and to Cephalonia. On the northern shore Missolonghi, also has a port. The old ports of Rio and Antirrio lie at the east end of the Gulf; there is a ferry service between them which complements the traffic over the Rio-Antirio bridge. The gulf is rich in fish and molluscs, including sea snails and clams.

== History ==
A number of major naval battles took place in the Gulf of Patras: the Battle of Patras in 1772, and the Battle of Lepanto in 1571, one of the largest naval battles ever fought. Lepanto itself lies further east, in the Gulf of Corinth.

== Cities and towns ==
The following major cities and towns are situated along the Gulf of Patras (from west to east):

- North side, Aetolia-Acarnania: Aitoliko, Missolonghi, Antirrio
- South side, Achaea: Kato Achaia, Vrachnaiika, Roitika, Paralia, Patras, Rio

== Rivers and streams ==
The following rivers flow into the Gulf of Patras (from west to east):

- North side:
  - Evinos
- South side:
  - Peiros
  - Panagitsa
  - Glafkos
  - Meilichos
  - Charadros

== Gallery ==
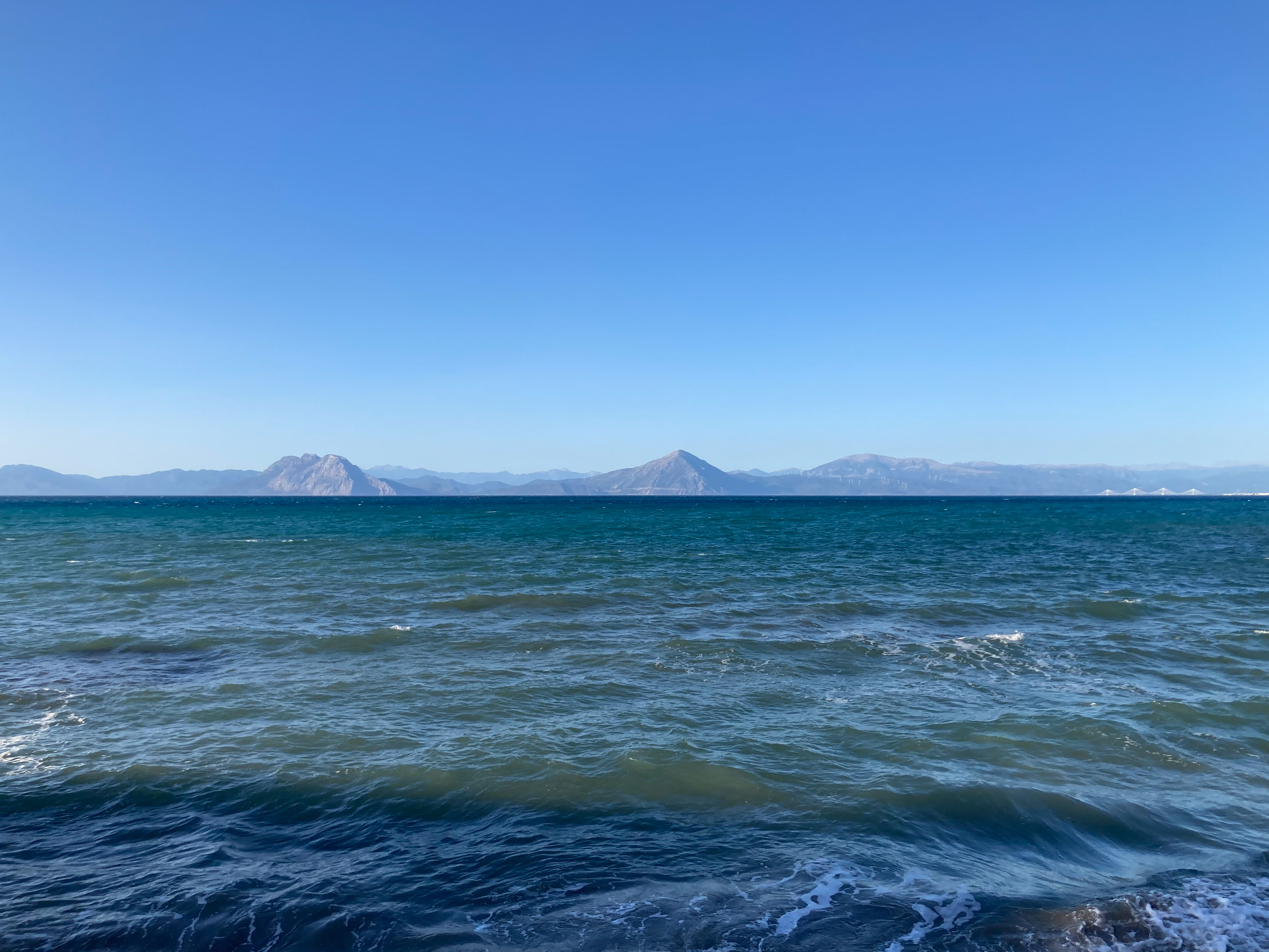
Patraic Gulf as viewed from Tsoukaleika. Varasova, Klokova, Rigani and the Rio-Antirrio Bridge are all visible.

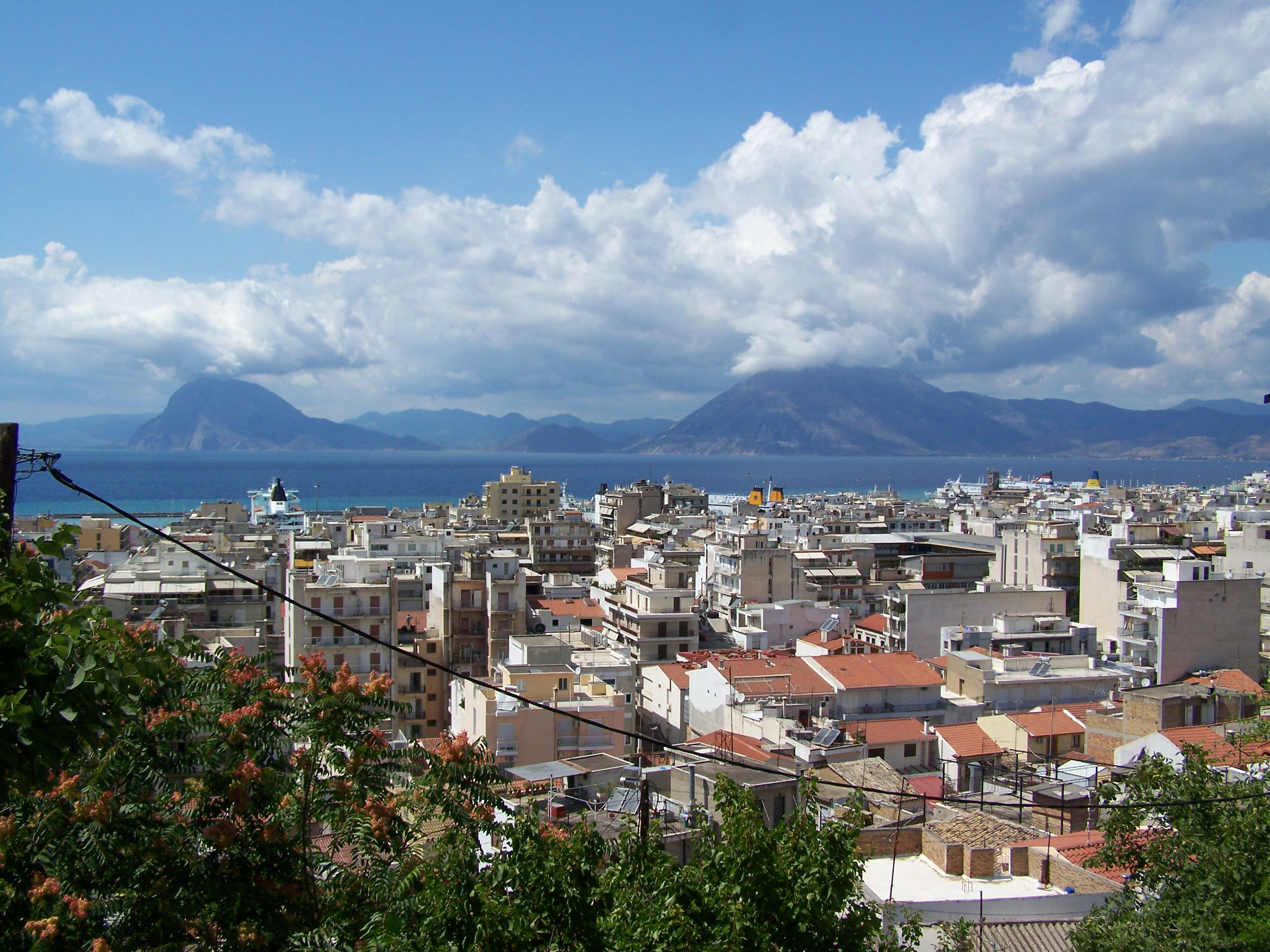
Gulf of Patras as viewed from Patras.

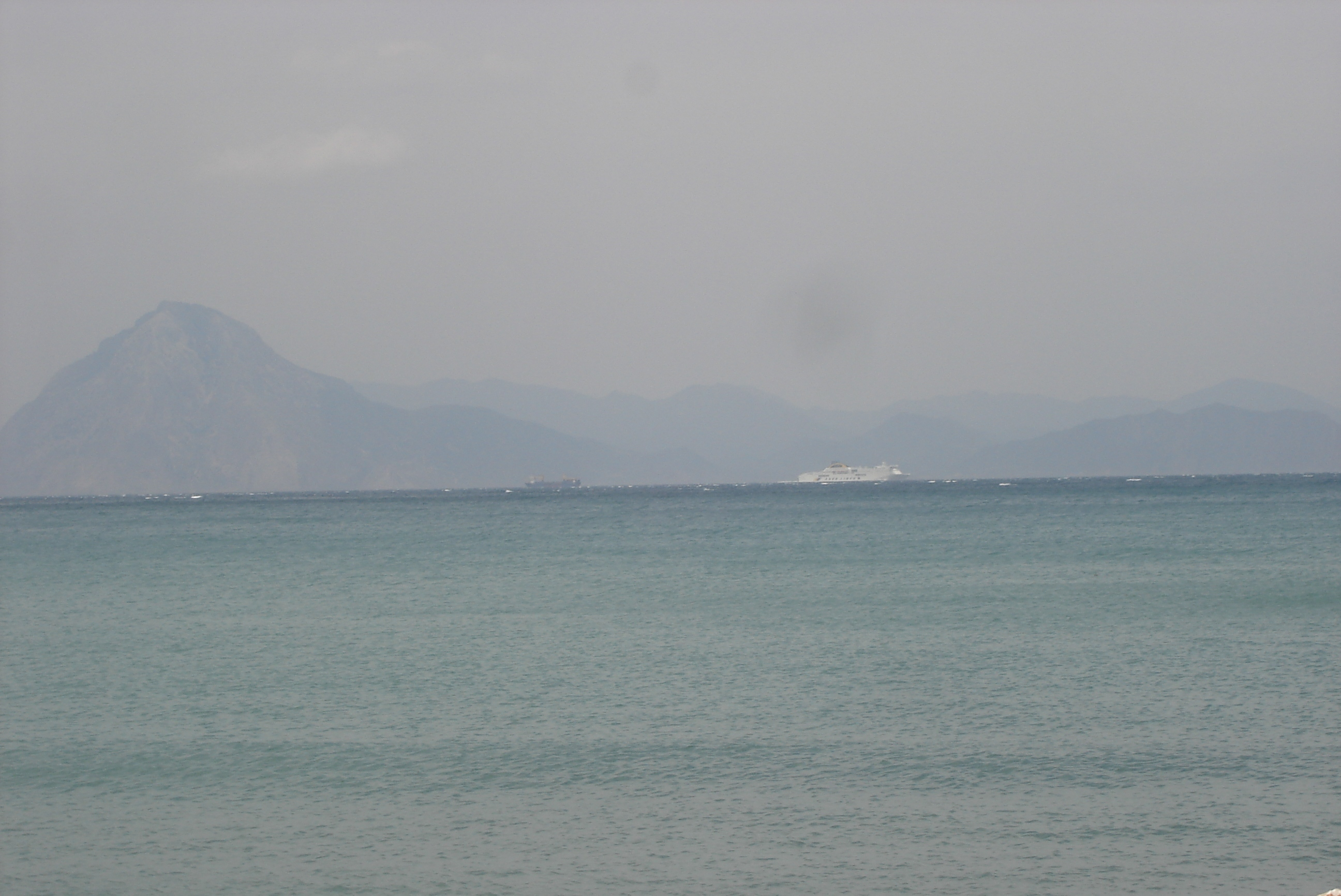
Gulf of Patras seen from the coast of Achaea; the mountains of Aetolia in the background

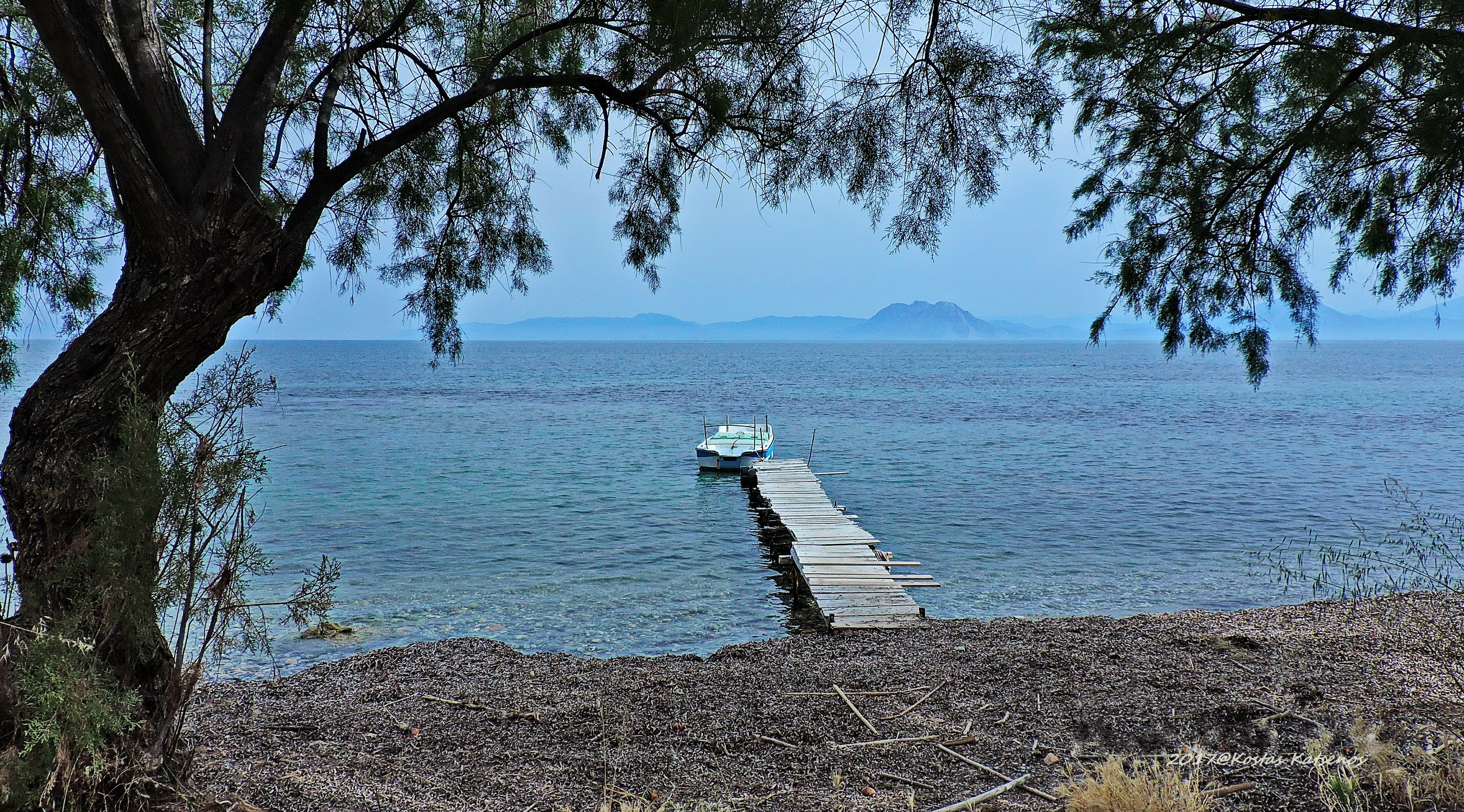
A view of the gulf from the village of Alissos.

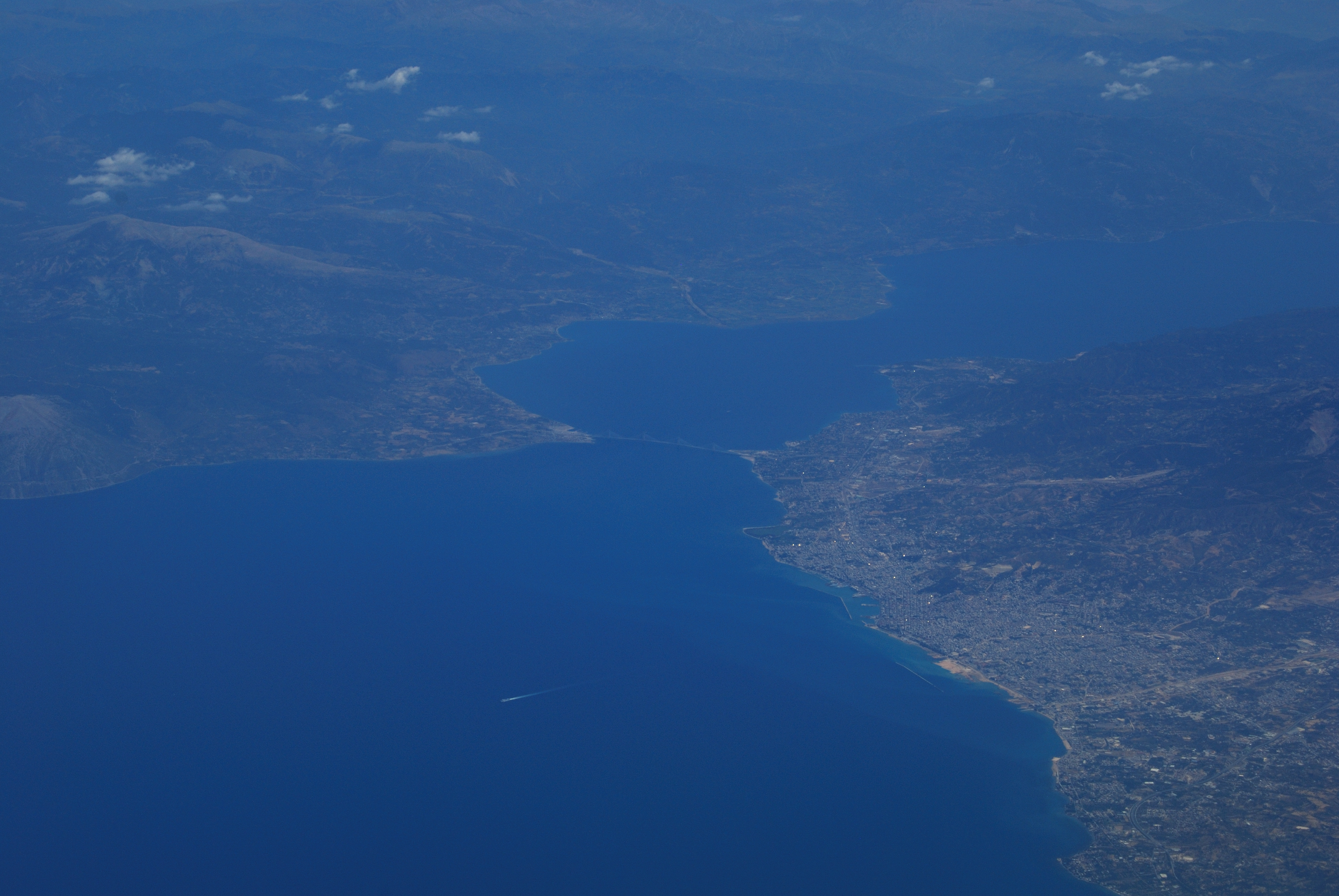
A view of the gulf, including the city of Patras, from the air.
