= Kokkinos Milos, Patras =

Neighbourhood in Patras, Achaea, Greece

Coordinates: 38.205°N 21.710°E

Kokkinos Milos (Greek: Κόκκινος Μύλος, meaning: red mill) is a neighbourhood in the southern part of the city of Patras, Achaea, Greece.

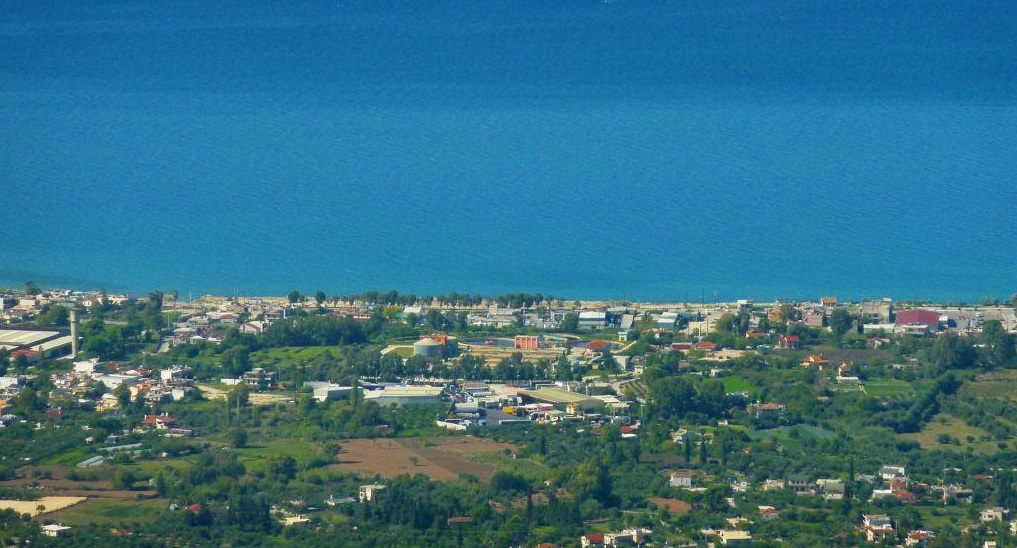
Kokkinos Milos, suburb of Patras, view from Omplos Mt.

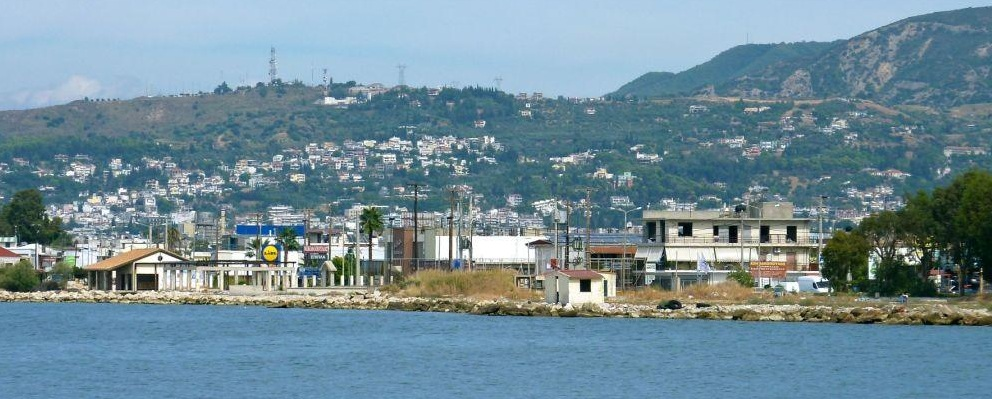
Kokkinos Milos, suburb of Patras, view from Paralia Patras

== Nearest places ==
- Ities, north
- Lefka, east
- Paralia, south
