= Krya Iteon =

Neighbourhood of Patras, Greece

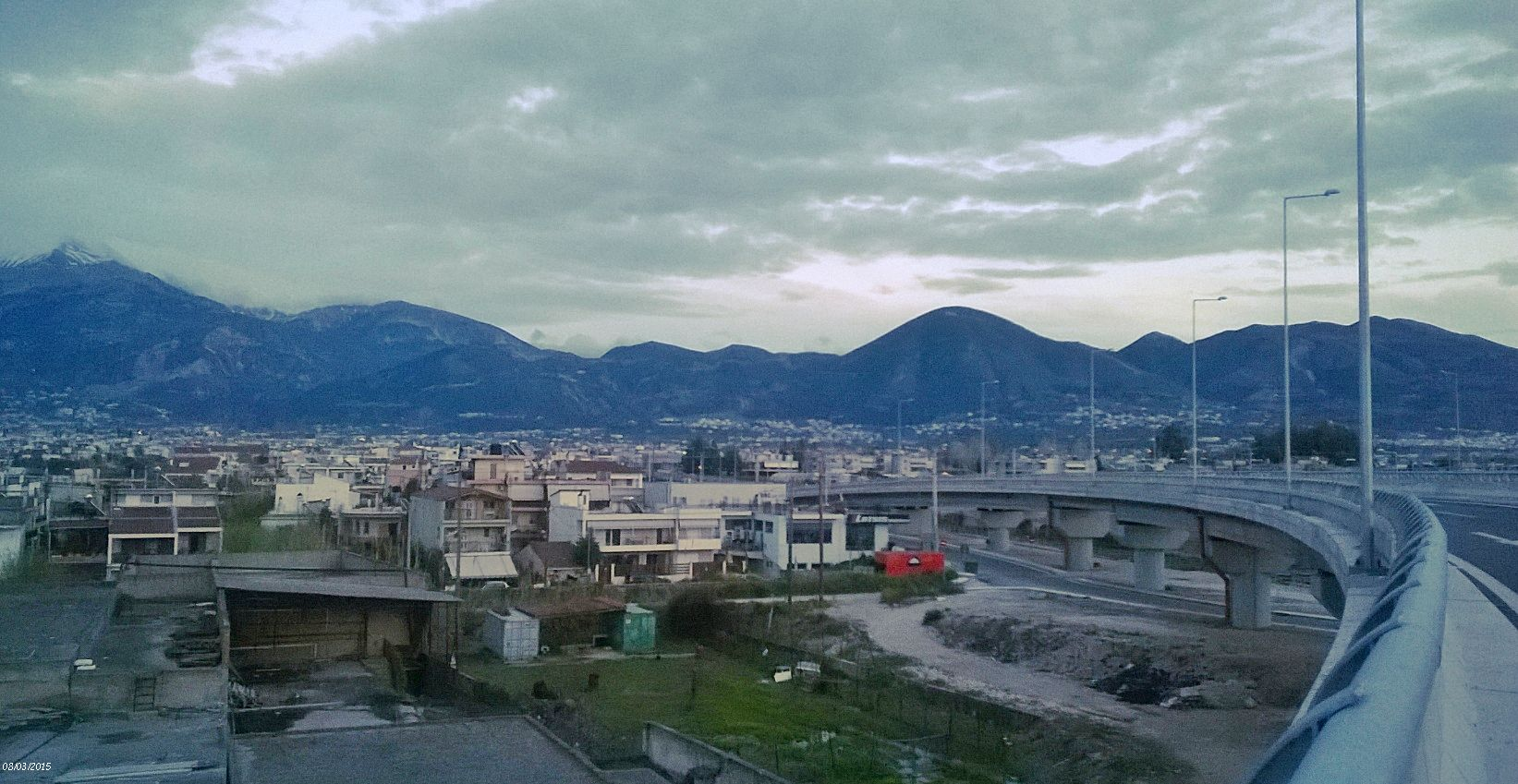
Partial view of Krya Iteon

Krya Iteon (Greek: Κρύα Ιτεών, meaning: "The cold (area or waters) of Ities") is a neighbourhood in the southern part of the city of Patras next to the Glafkos river.

After 1922 and the Greco-Turkish War (also known as the Asia Minor Disaster), refugees arrived in large numbers and lived in the Fourth Refugee Settlement. In the area features the area of Vasilopoulou (Βασιλόπουλου), Anastasopoulou (Αναστασόπουλου), Memou (Μέμου) and Stavropoulou (Σταυρόπουλου) in which the names comes from the owners of every area.

== Transport ==
The area is served by a station on Line P1 of Patras Suburban Railway.
