= Demenika =

Demenika Δεμένικα
- Settlement
- Location within Greece
- Coordinates: 38°12′N 21°45′E
- Country: Greece
- Geographic region: Peloponnese
- Administrative region: West Greece
- Regional unit: Achaea
- Municipality: Patras
- Municipal unit: Messatida
- Community: Saravali
- Elevation: 45 m (148 ft)

Population (2021)
  - Total: 2,845
- Time zone: UTC+2 (EET)
  - Summer (DST): UTC+3 (EEST)
- Postal code: 265 00
- Area code: 2610
- Vehicle registration: AX

Demenika (Greek: Δεμένικα) is a village/suburb in the municipality of Patras, Achaea, Greece. It lies 5 kilometres (3.1 mi) south of the city centre, south of the river Glafkos. It is part of the community of Saravali within the municipal unit of Messatida. It is 2 km northeast of Ovrya and 4 km east of Paralia. The Greek National Road 33 (Patras - Tripoli) passes through the village, and the new Greek National Road 9 (Patras - Pyrgos) passes south of the village.

== Historical population ==
Historical population
Year	Pop.	±%
1991	1,871	—
2001	2,433	+30.0%
2011	2,783	+14.4%
2021	2,845	+2.2%

== See also ==
- List of settlements in Achaea
