= Kallithea, Achaea =

Kallithea Καλλιθέα
- Community
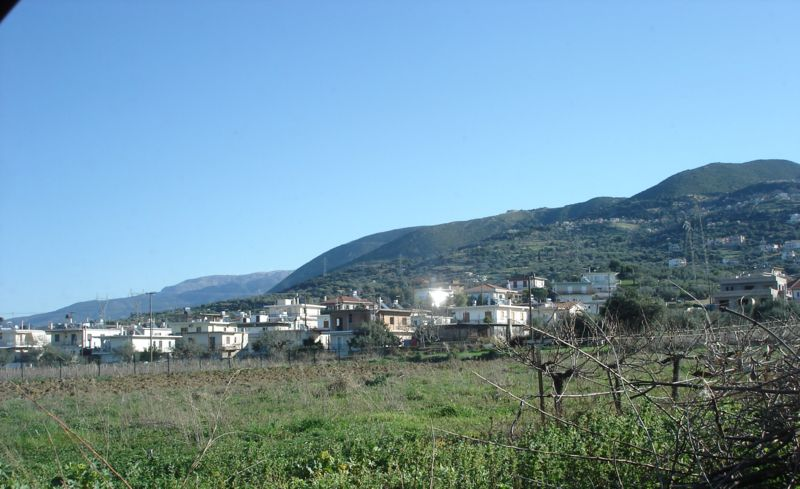

- Location within Greece
- Coordinates: 38°9.8′N 21°43.8′E
- Country: Greece
- Geographic region: Peloponnese
- Administrative region: West Greece
- Regional unit: Achaea
- Municipality: Patras
- Municipal unit: Messatida
- Districts: 2
- Elevation: 220 m (720 ft)

Population (2021)
  - Community: 884
- Time zone: UTC+2 (EET)
  - Summer (DST): UTC+3 (EEST)
- Postal code: 265 00
- Vehicle registration: AX

Kallithea (Greek: Καλλιθέα, before 1981: Καλλιθεόκαμπος - Kallitheokampos) is a community in the suburbs of Patras in Achaea, Greece. It is situated 9 km south of downtown Patras, on the Greek National Road 33 to Tripoli. The community consists of the villages Kallithea and Ano Kallithea, and is part of the municipal unit Messatida within the municipality of Patras. The nearest villages are Ovrya to the north and Thea to the west. To the east lies the mountain Omplos.

== Population ==
Historical population
Year	Pop.	±%
1981	462	—
1991	509	+10.2%
2001	701	+37.7%
2011	837	+19.4%
2021	884	+5.6%

== See also ==
- List of settlements in Achaea
- Sidirokastro (Achaea)
