= Saravali =

Saravali Σαράβαλι
- Community
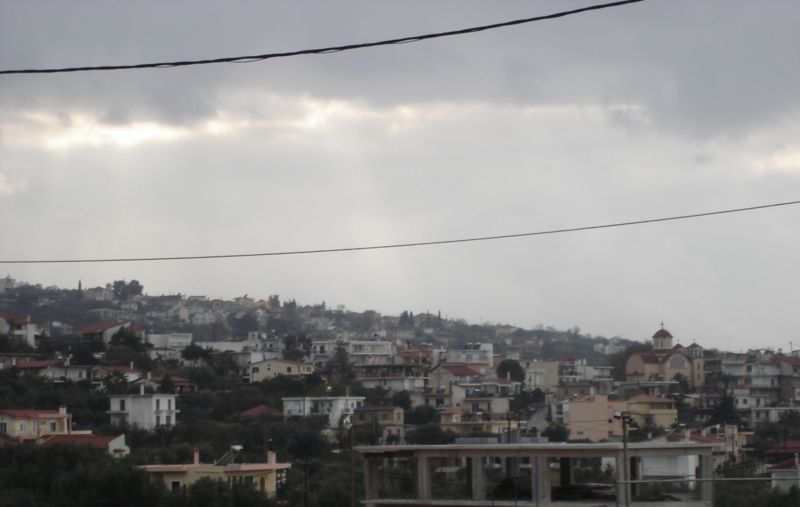
- Saravali

- Location within Greece
- Coordinates: 38°11′N 21°46′E
- Country: Greece
- Administrative region: West Greece
- Regional unit: Achaea
- Municipality: Patras
- Municipal unit: Messatida
- Elevation: 75 m (246 ft)

Population (2021)
  - Community: 4,618
- Time zone: UTC+2 (EET)
  - Summer (DST): UTC+3 (EEST)
- Postal code: 265 00
- Area code: 2610
- Vehicle registration: AX

Saravali (Greek: Σαράβαλι) is an important village and community in the municipal unit of Messatida, Patras, Achaea, Greece. The community is located at the southeastern edge of the agglomeration of Patras. The community consists of the villages Saravali, Agios Stefanos, Demenika (the largest village), Kefalovryso and Bakari. Saravali is 6 km south of Patras city centre. Adjacent communities are Petroto to the east, Patras to the north, Ovria to the west and Krini to the south. The Greek National Road 9 (Patras - Pyrgos) runs through the community.

== Population ==
Year	Village population	Community population
1981	-	2,018
1991	795	-
2001	866	3,943
2011	735	4,202
2021	749	4,618

== History ==
The castle of Saravali was built by the Franks in the 13th century. An important battle of the Greek War of Independence took place at Saravali in 1822 between the Ottomans, who held the fortified city Patras, and the Greek independence fighters led by Theodoros Kolokotronis. Every year, the commemoration of the battle is celebrated.

== See also ==
- List of settlements in Achaea
