= Achaia Clauss =

Greek winery

Coordinates: 38.1969°N 21.7701°E

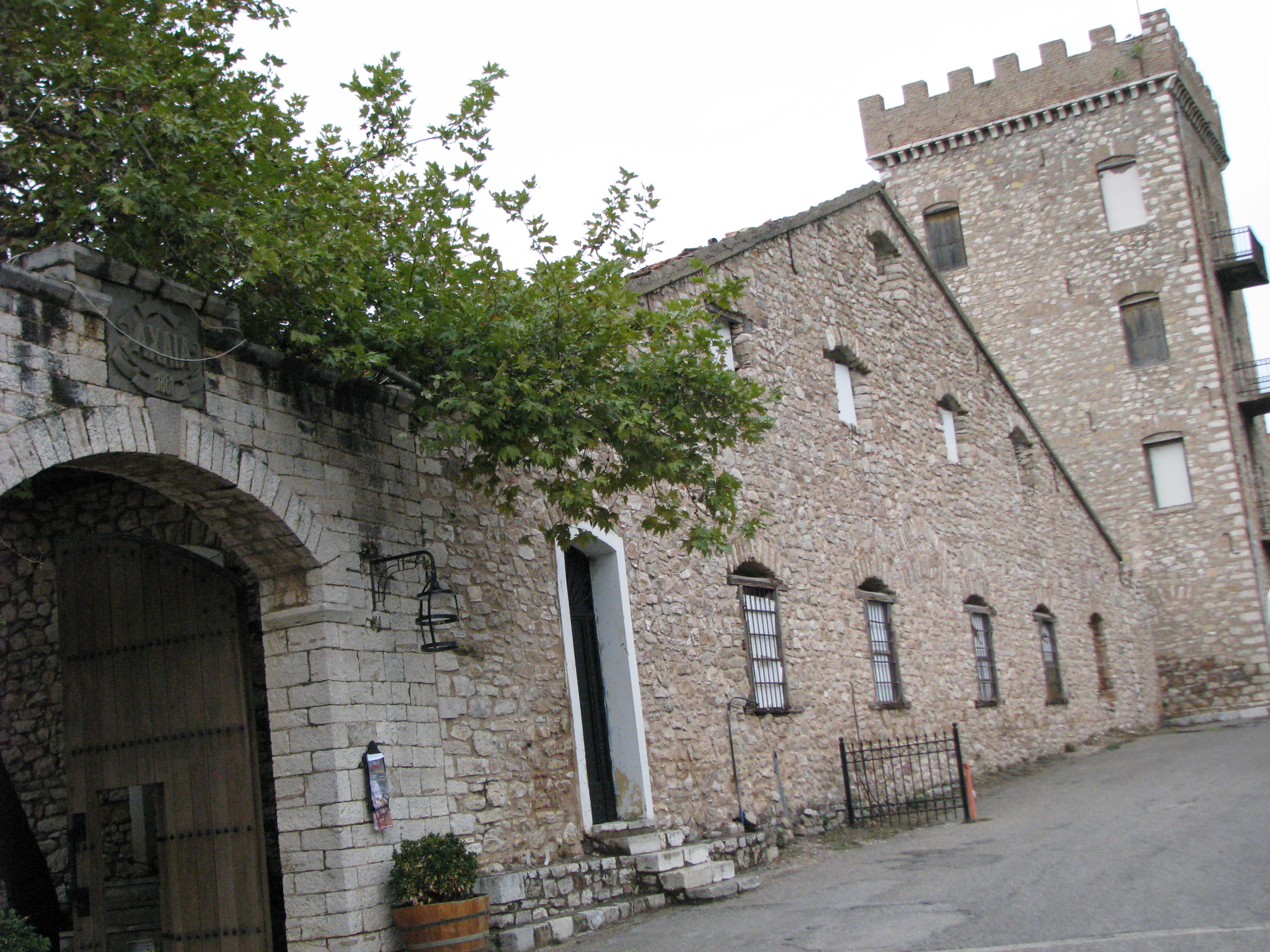
The Achaia Clauss winery, founded in 1861 by Gustav Clauss, and famous for its Mavrodaphne

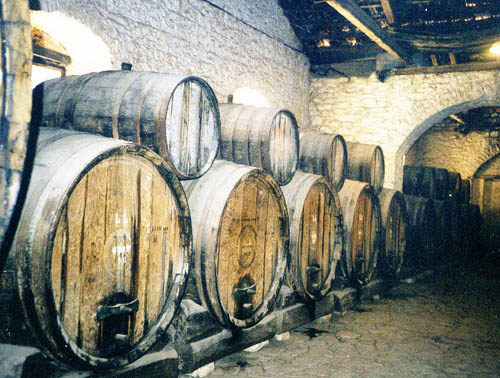
Wine barrel

Achaia Clauss is a Greek winery located in Patras in the Peloponnese. It was founded in 1861 by the Bavarian Gustav Clauss. It is most famous for its fortified red wine, Mavrodaphne. The winery was the main sponsor of the local basketball team, Apollon Achaia Clauss.

== History ==
In 1859, Gustav Clauss, a representative of the Bavarian company Fels and Co., purchased an area of 60 acres (240,000 m^{2}) of land from the landowner George Kostakis in Riganokampos in Patras at an altitude of 500 meters. His initial interest was in blackcurrants, but he built a summer residence there, where he planted a few vines as a hobby.

In 1861 he established the winery Achaia Clauss, which initially was managed by the estate of the Jakob Klipfel company. The first years of Achaia Clauss were extremely difficult since the property was attacked almost daily by gangs of brigands. The new venture nevertheless managed to survive and to establish itself in the region through its links with the central government of the Bavarian King Otto.

In 1872 the owners of Fels and Co., together with Theodor Harburger and Gustav Clauss, founded the "Achaia Wine Company". From 1873 until 1881 the company was managed by Emil Werl, and from 1883 by Gustav Clauss himself. From 1908 the company specialised in production of the Mavrodaphne and Demestica wines.

Clauss died shortly after, and the company passed into the hands of a German named Gudert from whom on the outbreak of World War I the Greek government confiscated the winery as an enemy alien asset. In 1920 it passed into the ownership of Vlassis Antonopoulos, and from then on, with a slight pause during the German occupation in World War II, the company developed rapidly.

A major landmark was in 1955 when the company took on Konstantinos Antonopoulos, who installed new machines in the winery and recruited a team of specialists. In 1983 the company launched their new bottling plant. In 1997 the position of chairman and chief executive was taken by Nikos Karapanos.

Since its establishment the site has always been a popular destination for visitors and continues to be so.

== Winery ==
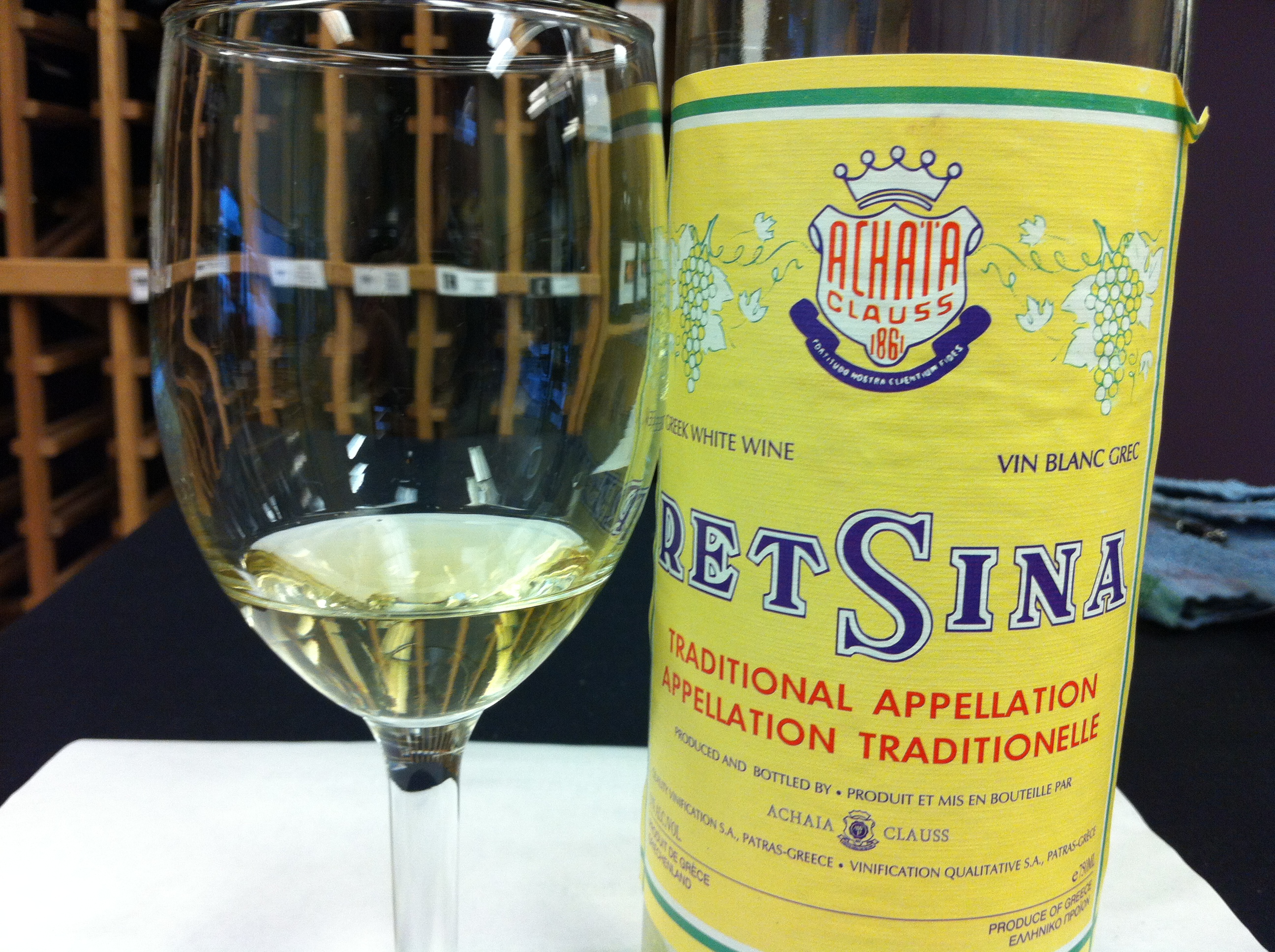
Retsina wine from Achaia Clauss.

The Achaia Clauss winery has many storage areas with a total capacity of about 7500 tonnes. The main ones are the storage of old Mavrodaphne wine, the storage of table wines, the subterranean tanks, and the Danielis storage room.

== Famous visitors ==
Through the years many important people have visited Achaia Clauss: Eleutherios Venizelos, Melina Merkouri, empress Sissy of Austria, General Montgomery, Alexander Fleming, Ecumenical Patriarch Bartholomew, Pavlos Koundouriotis, Aristotelis Onassis, Omar Sharif, King Gustav Adolf of Sweden, Kings George I, Konstantinos I and George II of Greece, Queen Alexandra of Great Britain, Queen Louise of Sweden, Queens Olga and Sofia of Greece, princess Marie Bonaparte of Greece and Denmark, Nadia Comaneci, Thanos Mikroutsikos, Manolis Glezos, Agnes Baltsa, Karolos Papoulias.

== Sources ==
- Μούλιας, Χρήστος, 2000: Το λιμάνι της σταφίδας. Εκδόσεις Περί Τεχνών: Πάτρα ISBN 960-86814-0-5
