= Ovria =

Ovria Οβριά
- Community
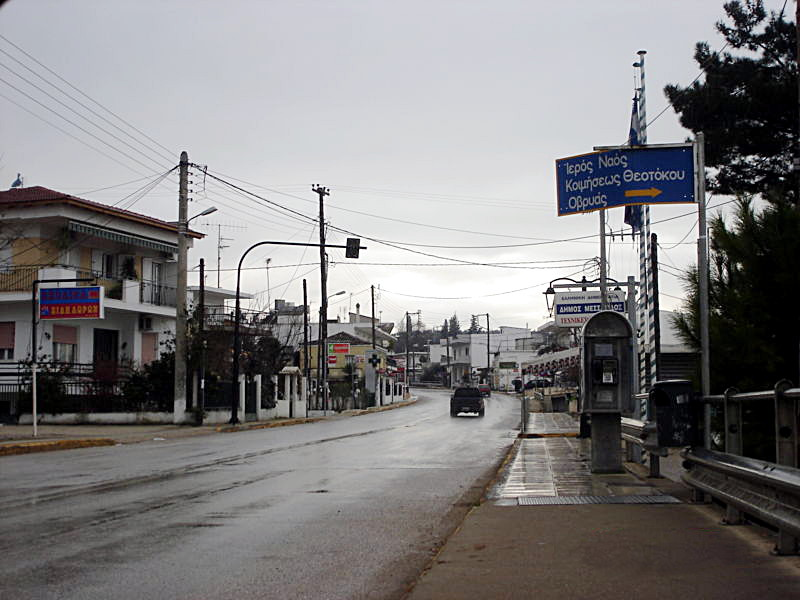
- City hall street

- Location within Greece
- Coordinates: 38°11.5′N 21°44′E
- Country: Greece
- Geographic region: Peloponnese
- Administrative region: West Greece
- Regional unit: Achaea
- Municipality: Patras
- Municipal unit: Messatida
- Elevation: 70 m (230 ft)

Population (2021)
  - Community: 6,424
- Time zone: UTC+2 (EET)
  - Summer (DST): UTC+3 (EEST)
- Postal code: 265 00
- Area code: 2610
- Vehicle registration: AX

Ovria (Greek: Οβριά, also: Οβρυά - Ovrya) is a district in Patras, Greece. , located 6 km south of Patras city centre. Since the 2011 local government reform it is part of the municipality Patras, of which it is a community. Between 1997 and 2011, it was the seat of the former municipality of Messatida. The A5 motorway and EO33 road pass through the town, although there is no direct interchange between the two main roads. Ovria is in the transition zone from the densely populated coastal area to the hills in the southeast, including Omplos. Agriculture (olive groves, pastures) is still the dominant land use in the areas south and east of Ovria. Neighboring communities are Demenika to the northeast, Mintilogli to the west, Krini to the east, and Kallithea to the south.

== Gallery ==
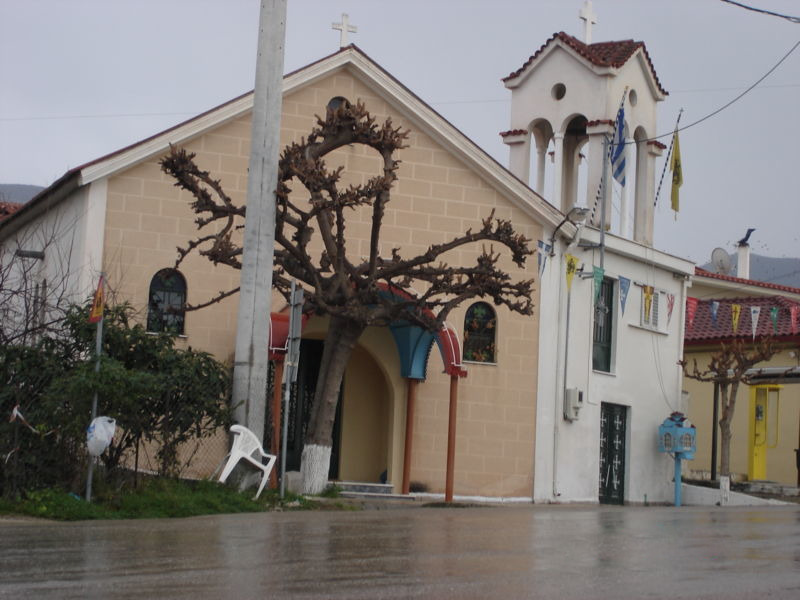

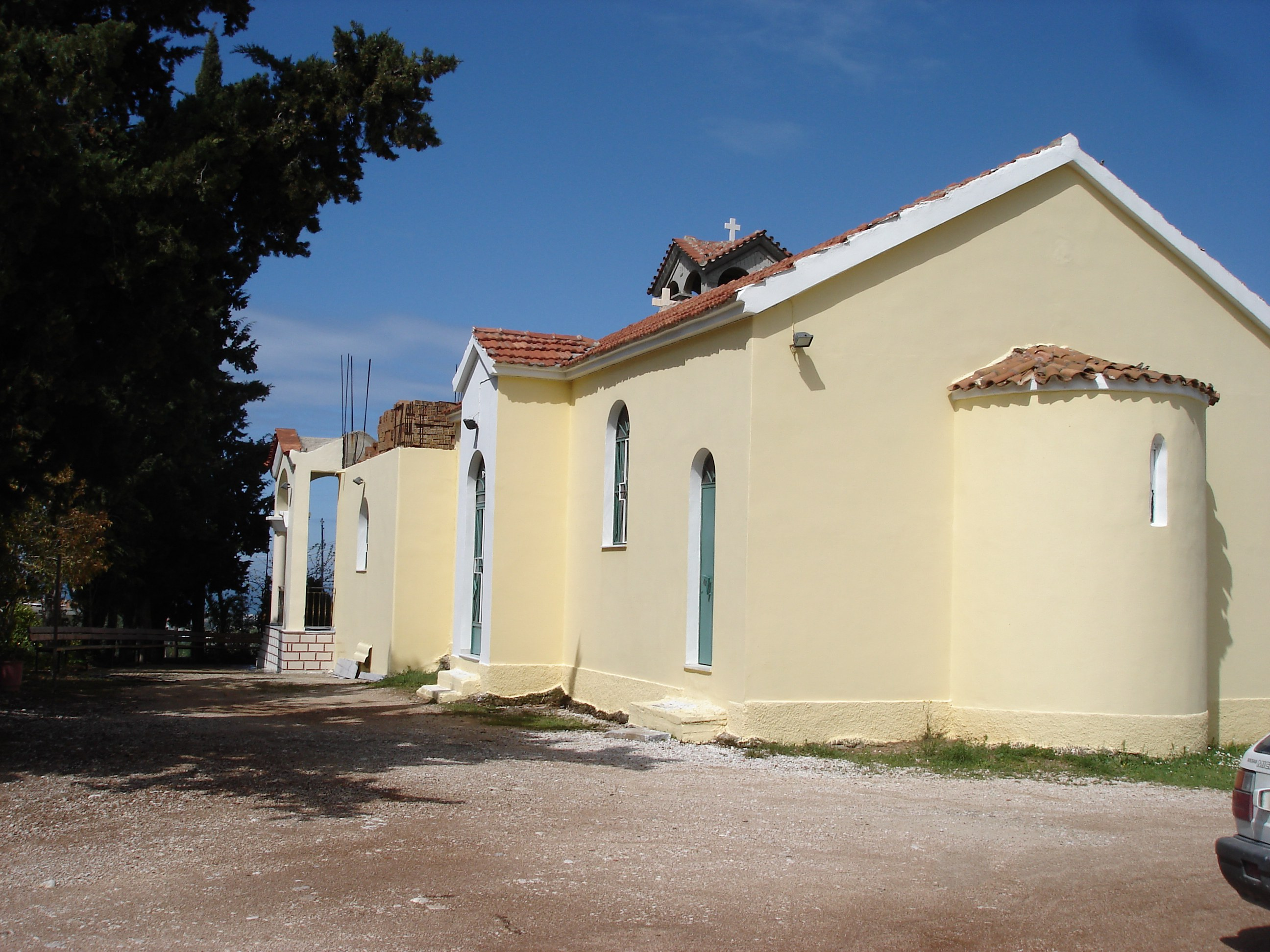
