= Omplos =

Mountain in Achaea, Greece

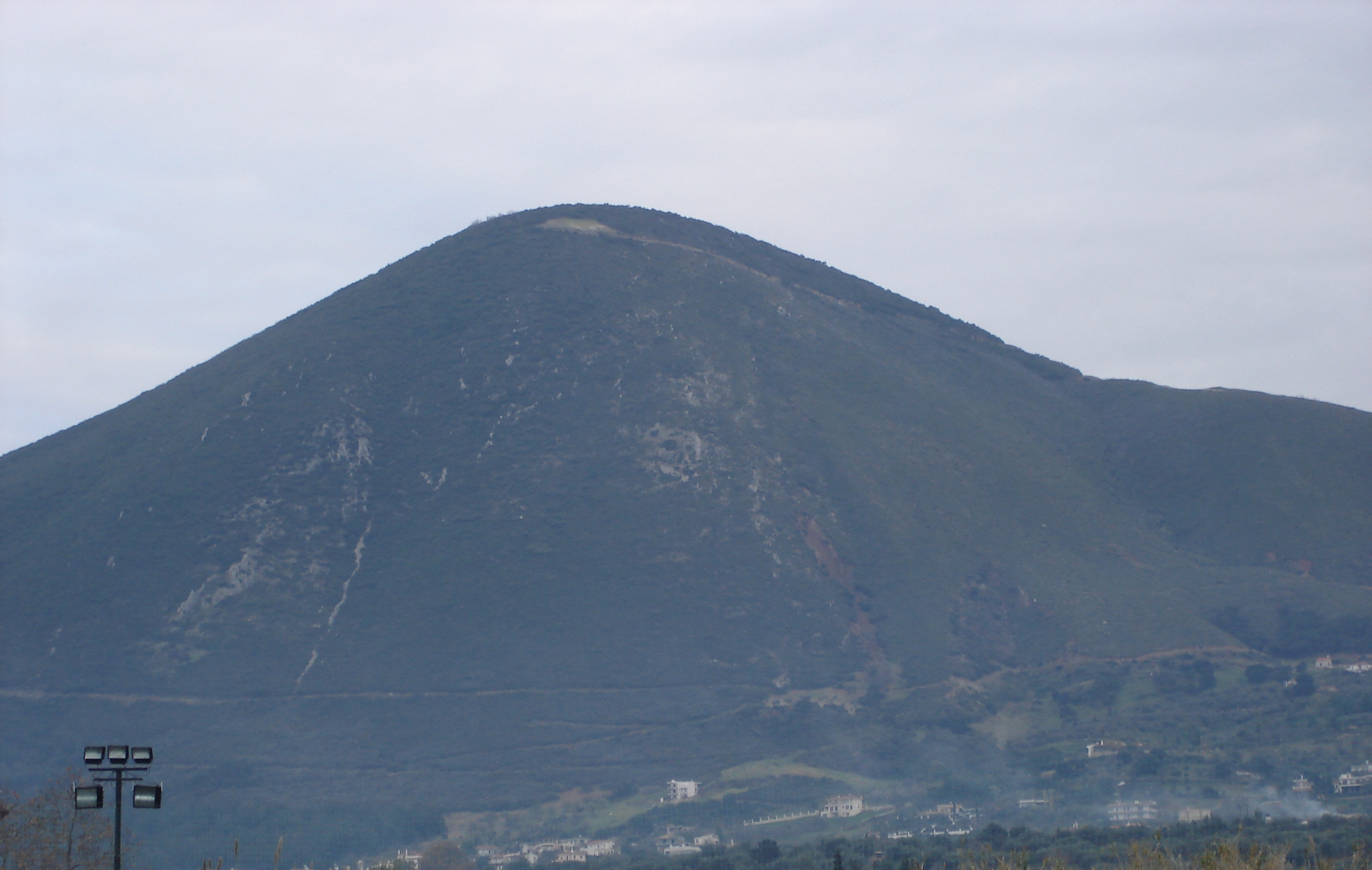
- Omplos from Patras

Highest point
- Elevation: 926 m (3,038 ft)
- Coordinates: 38°09′58″N 21°46′52″E

Geography
- Location within Greece
- Location: Achaea, Greece

Omplos (Greek: Ομπλός) is a mountain in Achaea, Greece. It rises steeply from the coastal plains around Patras to 926 m elevation. It is separated from the higher mountain Panachaikos by the valley of the river Glafkos. The summit is 2 km west of the village Petroto, 4 km east of Kallithea, 4 km southeast of Saravali and 10 km southeast of Patras city centre.

The Omplos Monastery is situated on the mountain, at about 740 m elevation. Paragliding is commonly practiced on the mountain since the 1990s, and championships have been held.
