= Krini, Patras =

Krini
- Community
- Location within Greece
- Coordinates: 38°11.1′N 21°44.9′E
- Country: Greece
- Geographic region: Peloponnese
- Administrative region: West Greece
- Regional unit: Achaea
- Municipality: Patras
- Municipal unit: Messatida
- Elevation: 779 m (2,556 ft)

Population (2021)
  - Community: 1,345
- Time zone: UTC+2 (EET)
  - Summer (DST): UTC+3 (EEST)
- Postal code: 25 100
- Area code: 26910
- Vehicle registration: AX

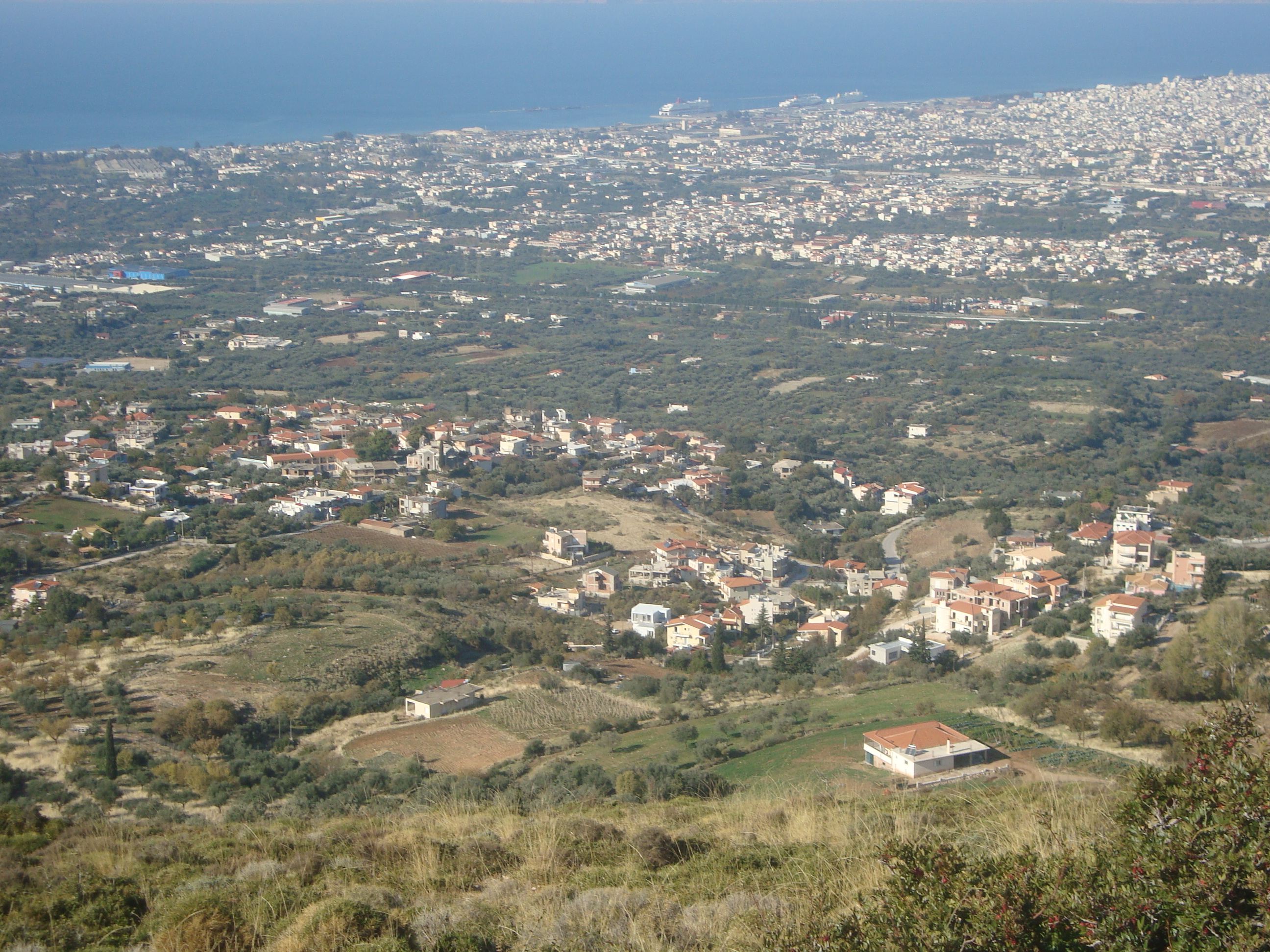
Krini village, Patras, Greece.

Krini is a village and community in the Patras municipality, southwestern Greece.
