= Paralia, Achaea =

Paralia Παραλία
- Municipal unit
- Location within the regional unit

- Location within Greece
- Coordinates: 38°11′N 21°42′E
- Country: Greece
- Administrative region: West Greece
- Regional unit: Achaea
- Municipality: Patras

Area
  - Municipal unit: 11.98 km^{2} (4.63 sq mi)
- Elevation: 5 m (16 ft)

Population (2021)
  - Municipal unit: 8,903
  - Municipal unit density: 743.2/km^{2} (1,925/sq mi)
  - Community: 5,378
- Time zone: UTC+2 (EET)
  - Summer (DST): UTC+3 (EEST)
- Postal code: 263 xx, 264 xx, 265 00
- Area code: 2610
- Vehicle registration: ΑΧ

Paralia (Greek: Παραλία, Paralía, meaning "beach") is a town and a former municipality in the municipality of Patras, Achaea, West Greece, Greece.

Since the 2011 local government reform it is part of the municipality Patras, of which it is a municipal unit. The municipal unit has an area of 11.978 km^{2}. It is a suburb of Patras, about 6 km southwest of the city centre. The town population is about 5,400. It was a popular beach resort for residents of Patras area till mid '80s. The new Greek National Road 9 (Patras - Pyrgos) runs south of the town.

The railway Patras - Pyrgos runs parallel to the coast, at about 200 m from the shore.

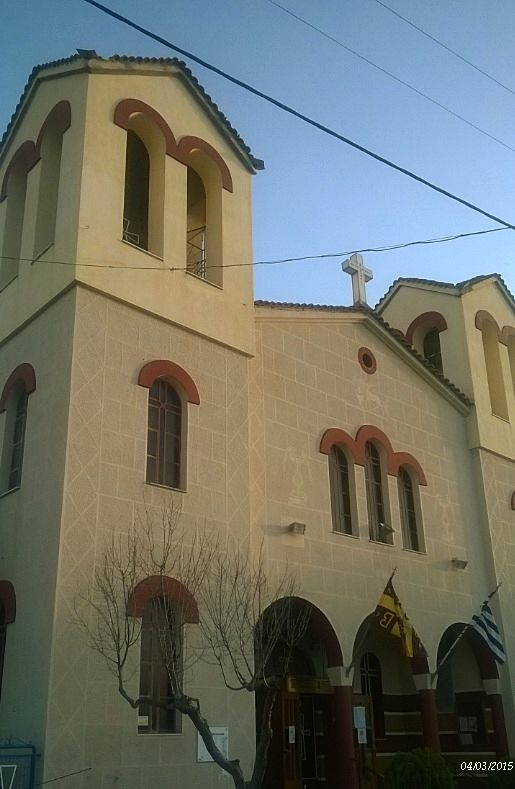
St. John the Baptist Orthodox Church in Paralia

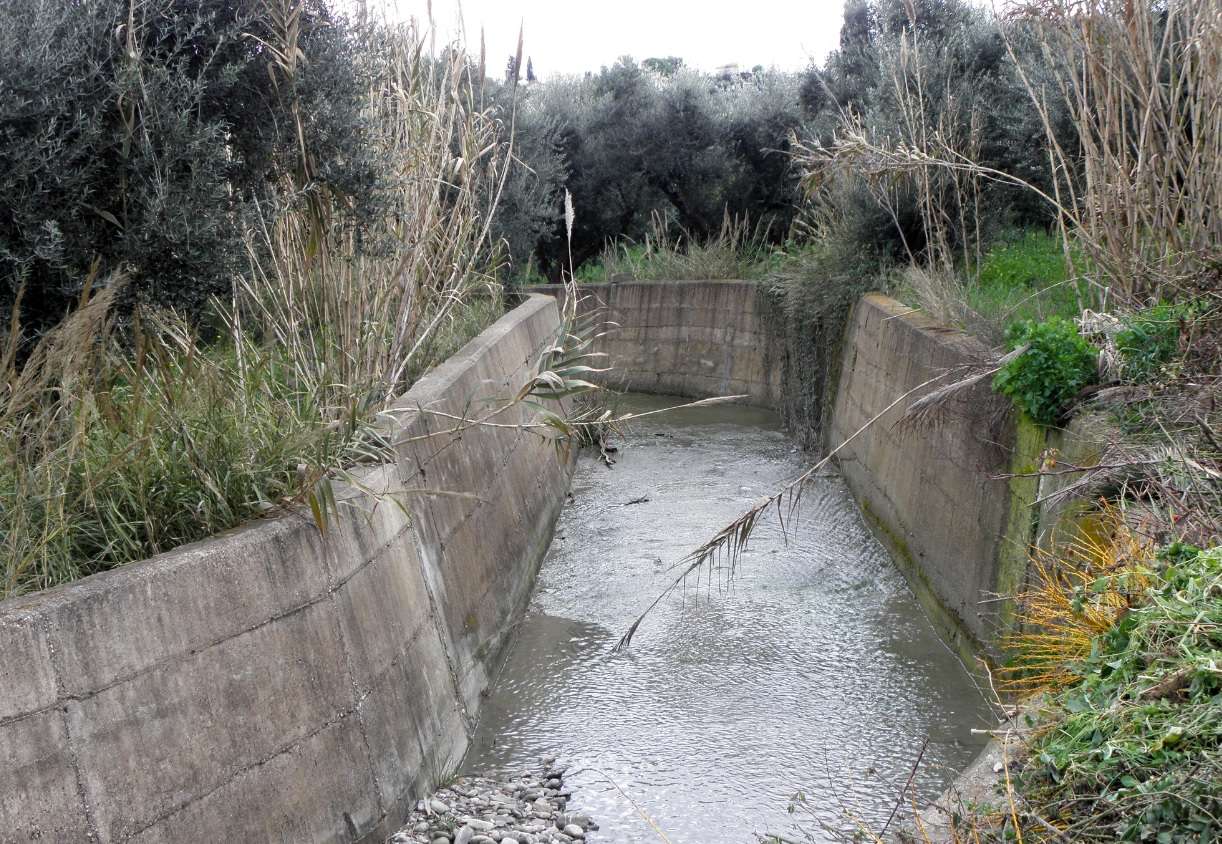
Ligias, a torrent in Paralia Patras

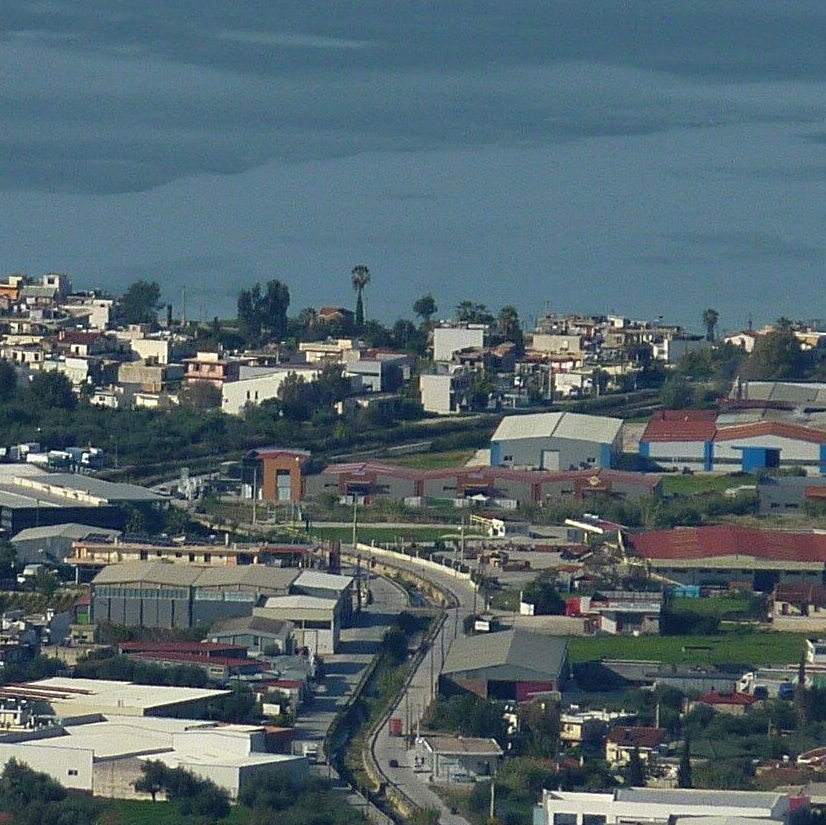
Panagitsa, a torrent in Paralia Patras, view from Omplos Mt.

== Population history ==
| Year | Town population | Municipality population |
|---|---|---|
| 1981 | 2,730 | - |
| 1991 | 3,122 | 5,667 |
| 2001 | 6,124 | 9,156 |
| 2011 | 6,336 | 9,987 |
| 2021 | 5,378 | 8,903 |

== Subdivisions ==
The municipal unit Paralia is subdivided into the following communities:

- Mintilogli
- Paralia
- Roitika

== See also ==
- List of settlements in Achaea
