= Spyridonas Chrysanthakidis =

Greek politician

Spyridonas Chrysanthakidis Σπυρίδωνας Χρυσανθακίδης 9th Mayor of Patras 1862-1866
- Born: 1862; Patras, Greece
- Died: 20th century Patras, Greece
- Occupations: politician, mayor of Patras

Spyridonas Chrysanthakidis (Greek: Σπυρίδωνας Χρυσανθακίδης, 1862-mid 20th century, year unknown) was a Greek politician of Achaia and a mayor of Patras.

He was born in Patras in 1862 and was a mayoral leader. In the same year, he was appointed mayor of Patras, replacing Periklis Kalamogdartis. During his tenure, he began the numbering of houses and naming of streets in Patras. He remained in the office for the four whole years, being succeeded by the newly elected Kalamogdartis in 1866.

Preceded by Periklis Kalamogdartis	Mayor of Patras (1862 - 1866)	Succeeded by Periklis Kalamogdartis (second run)
